= Praza da Ferrería =

Medieval square in Pontevedra, Spain

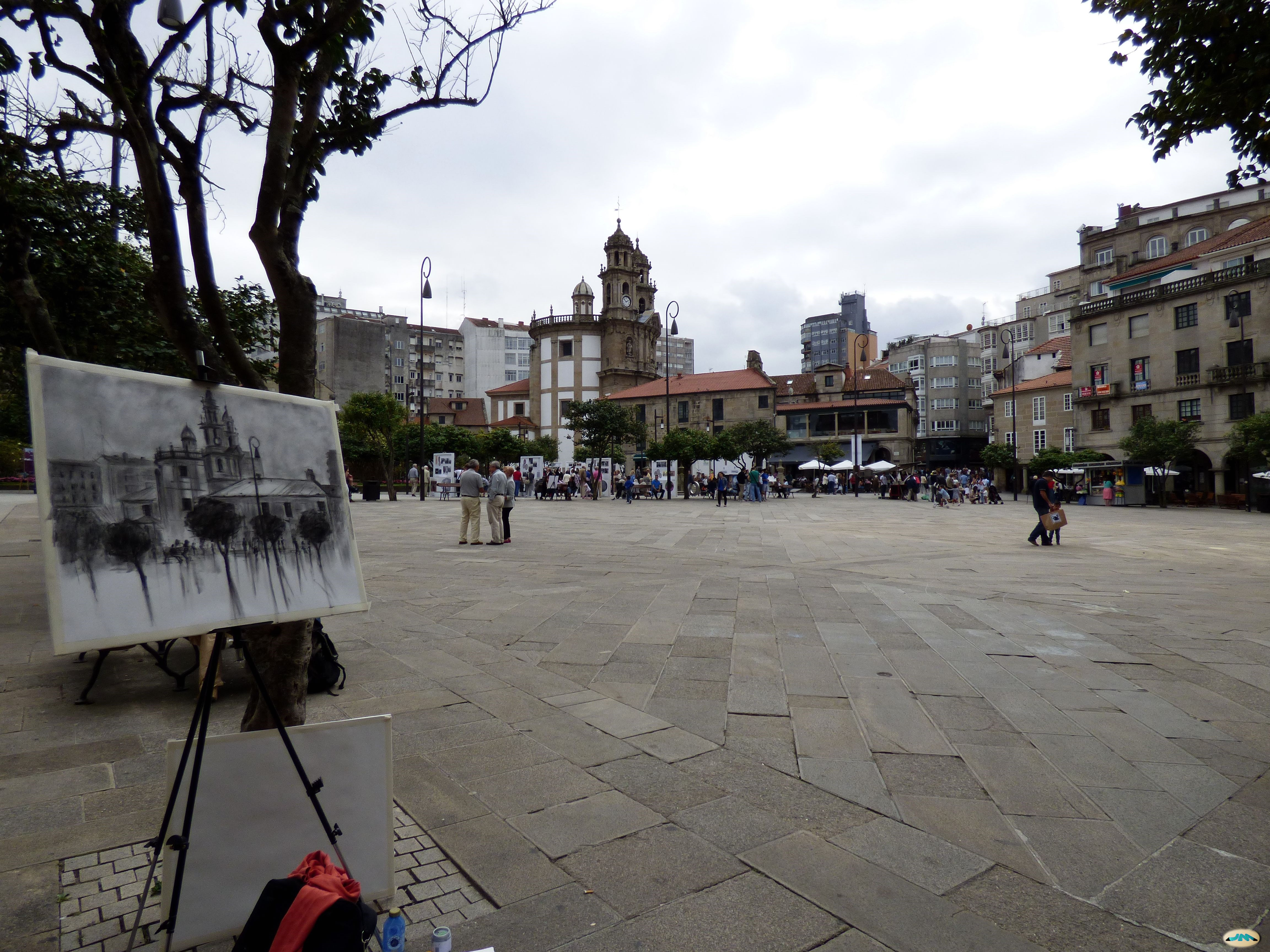
- Blacksmith's square
- Native name: Praza da Ferrería (Galician)
- Type: plaza
- Maintained by: Pontevedra City Council
- Location: Pontevedra, Spain
- Postal code: 36002
- Coordinates: 42.431406°N 8.644246°W

The Praza da Ferrería (Blacksmith's square) is a large square located on the edge of the old town of Pontevedra (Spain), inside the old city walls. It is the main square of the old town and has an area of about 2,000 m2. It includes the small squares of the Estrella on the north side, the Orense square on the south side and the Casto Sampedro square on the east side, making a total of almost 5,000 m2.

== Origin of the name ==
The square takes its name from the forges that were located there in the Middle Ages, since the Catholic Monarchs decreed certain orders to arm the Spanish knights with arms from Pontevedra and Oviedo.

== History ==
The first references to the square date from between 1325 and 1330. In the Middle Ages it was known as the Plaza de Trabancas, and it took on the name of Ferrería around 1820 in memory of the old craftsmen and Blacksmiths who lived there, who made all sorts of weapons and iron instruments and who became famous throughout the country.

The square was enlarged in the 15th century to accommodate the Feira Franca market, a tax-free market that began to take place in the city by a royal privilege established by King Henry IV in 1467.

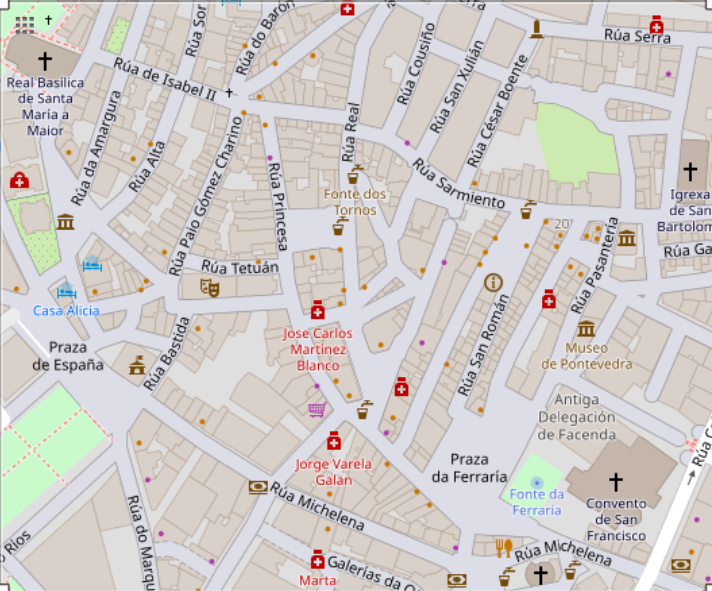
Praza da Ferraría (in Galician) at the bottom right, in the historic centre

In the middle of the Casto Sampedro square, on the eastern side of the square, there is a 16th-century fountain that stood on the paved side of the square, in the middle, until 1857. Financed in 1537 by Charles V, whose coat of arms it bears, and completed 15 years later, it was built in the style of Portuguese fountains (chafariz) by João Lópes and Domingo Fernández. The fountain was used to welcome pilgrims on their way to Santiago de Compostela after entering the walled enclosure of the city through the Trabancas gate of the walls. It is mentioned in the popular song:

PONTEVEDRA É BOA VILA
DÁ DE BEBER A QUEN PASA.
A FONTE NA FERRERÍA,
SAN BARTOLOMÉ NA PRAZA.

Pontevedra is a good city
Give a drink to those who pass by,
The fountain in A Ferrería
St Bartholomew's in the square

Since the 17th century bullfights were held in the square, which was enclosed with wooden fences. In 1820 the square was renamed Praza da Ferrería, its current name, in memory of the blacksmiths' guild. In 1845, the land below the Convent of St. Francis was levelled for landscaping. In 1853, the steps leading to the church were built. In 1928, the fountain was restored and installed in the Casto Sampedro square (the result of this landscaping), some fifty metres from its original location. It served as a model for many of the fountains that were built in the cloisters of convents and in front of some pazos.

Between 1854 and 1931, the square was called Plaza de la Constitución. The city's market was once held on the paved side of the square. In 1910, the square was remodelled and paved and the two Art Nouveau buildings were built opposite the convent of Saint Francis.

In 1983 the Pontevedra City Council decided to pave the Chocolate Street with granite, the renovation of which was inaugurated in August 1984. The refurbishment meant the elimination of road traffic along the street and the first step towards the unification of the spaces of the Praza da Ferrería and the Casto Sampedro gardens. The street was renamed Paseo de las Camelias until 1988 when it adopted its definitive name of Antonio Odriozola.

== Description ==
The streets of Soportais da Ferrería, Conde de San Román, Pasantería, Benito Corbal, Figueroa, and the old Trabancas Gate of the walls, which is part of the Portuguese Way, lead to it. Next to it is the church of the Pilgrim Virgin.

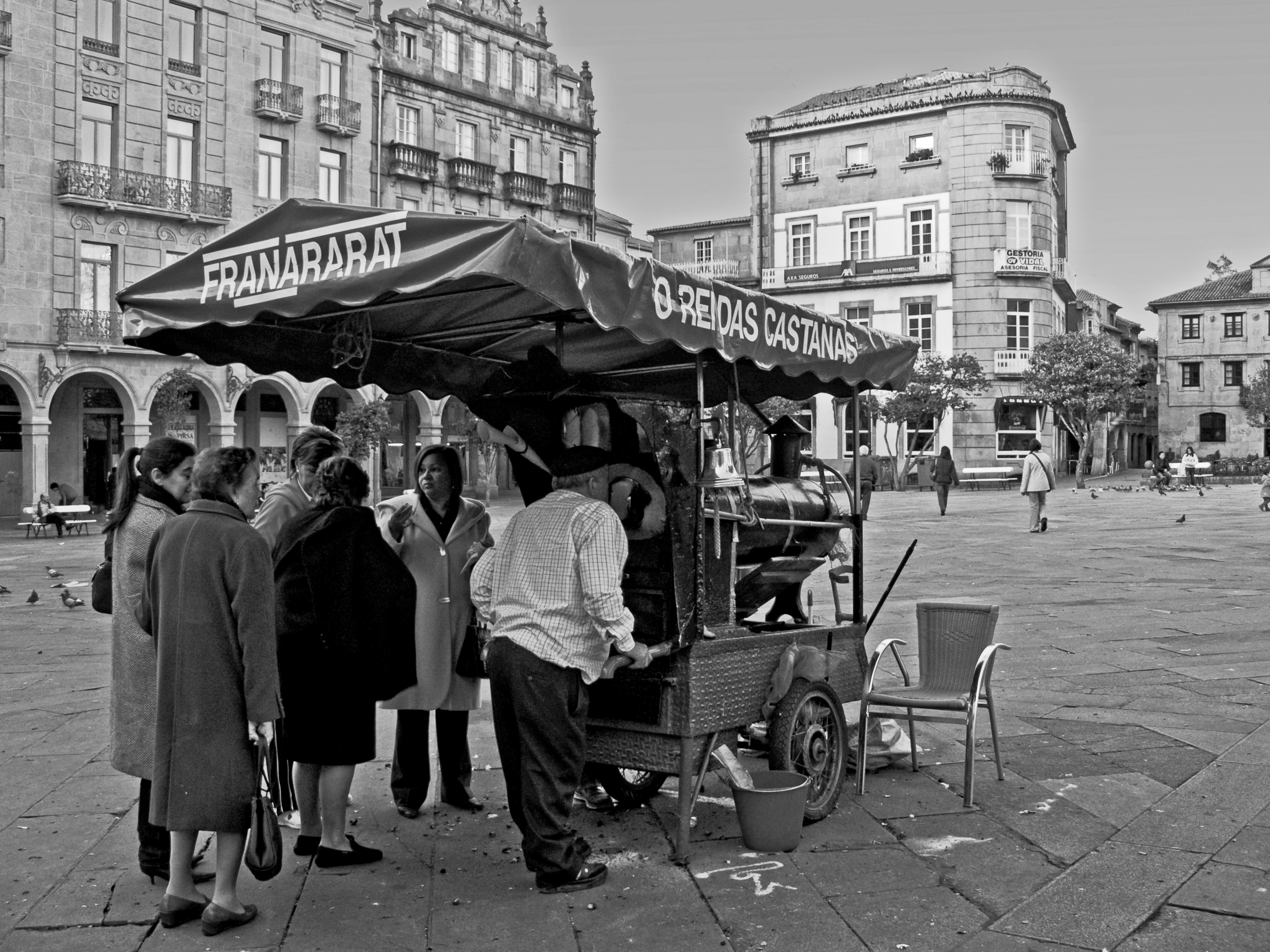
A man selling chestnuts in the Praza da Ferrería.

Its commercial premises are mostly textile or hotel establishments. The famous Almacenes Clarita textile shop opened in 1916. The square is located next to the Convent of St. Francis and the small squares of the Estrella (700 m2), and Orense (700 m2), as well as the 1,000 m2 Casto Sampedro square.

Two of the city's oldest cafés are located in the square: Café Savoy (now Restobar Savoy), an intellectual meeting place since 1936, and Carabela, which opened ten years later, in 1946.

Between the Praza da Ferrería and the Casto Sampedro gardens is the Paseo Antonio Odriozola, lined with camellias and benches, formerly known as Rúa do Chocolate due to its old black cobblestone paving.

== Remarkable buildings ==
The buildings in the square date from the 14th to the 20th century. To the east and north of the square are the convent and the Gothic church of Saint Francis, and below, in the middle of the Casto Sampedro square, is the famous Renaissance fountain of A Ferrería.

To the west of the square are two remarkable Art Nouveau buildings. The Art Nouveau building at number 8, further south, is the older of the two. It was designed by the architect Andrés López de Ocáriz Robledo, who completed the project in June 1912. The building was promoted by Juan Pazos, a rich emigrant who returned from America, who bought four of the five small 15th-century houses that bounded the square to the west and which were demolished. It consists of a ground floor with double-height arcades, three floors and an attic. Art Nouveau decoration with floral and geometric motifs appears on the main façade above and below the doors and windows, as well as on the central curved pediment with a semicircular arch and on the cornices on either side of it. The building has two large central wrought iron balconies on the first two floors and four side balconies on the third floor. It was completely renovated in 2007 by the architects César Portela and Enrique Barreiro Álvarez.

The Art Nouveau building at number 9, further north, was built in the 1920s. It has a ground floor with double-height arches and four floors, topped by a small central pediment with geometric decoration. This decoration is also present on the sides of the balcony doors and especially under the balconies on the first floor. The building stands out for the stone balcony on each of the four French windows on each floor. These have red, green and blue stained glass windows in chromatic harmony with those of the Saint Francis church. The building, which has two access doors from the square, with two different flights of stairs to allow independent access to the two flats on each floor, was completely renovated by architect Mauro Lomba in 2022

To the south of the square is the church of the Pilgrim Virgin in the background. The Casa de las Caras is located in the Plaza de la Estrella.

== Culture ==
The square is usually full of pigeons that children like to feed. The Atlantic Craft and Design Fair is held here in July. The flower market is currently held here on the eve of All Saints' Day, as well as various popular markets on days such as Feira Franca or Book Day.

In addition, there are free concerts in the summer and the burning of Ravachol's parrot during the Carnival. In autumn it is the place to be for the traditional chestnut sellers.

== Gallery ==
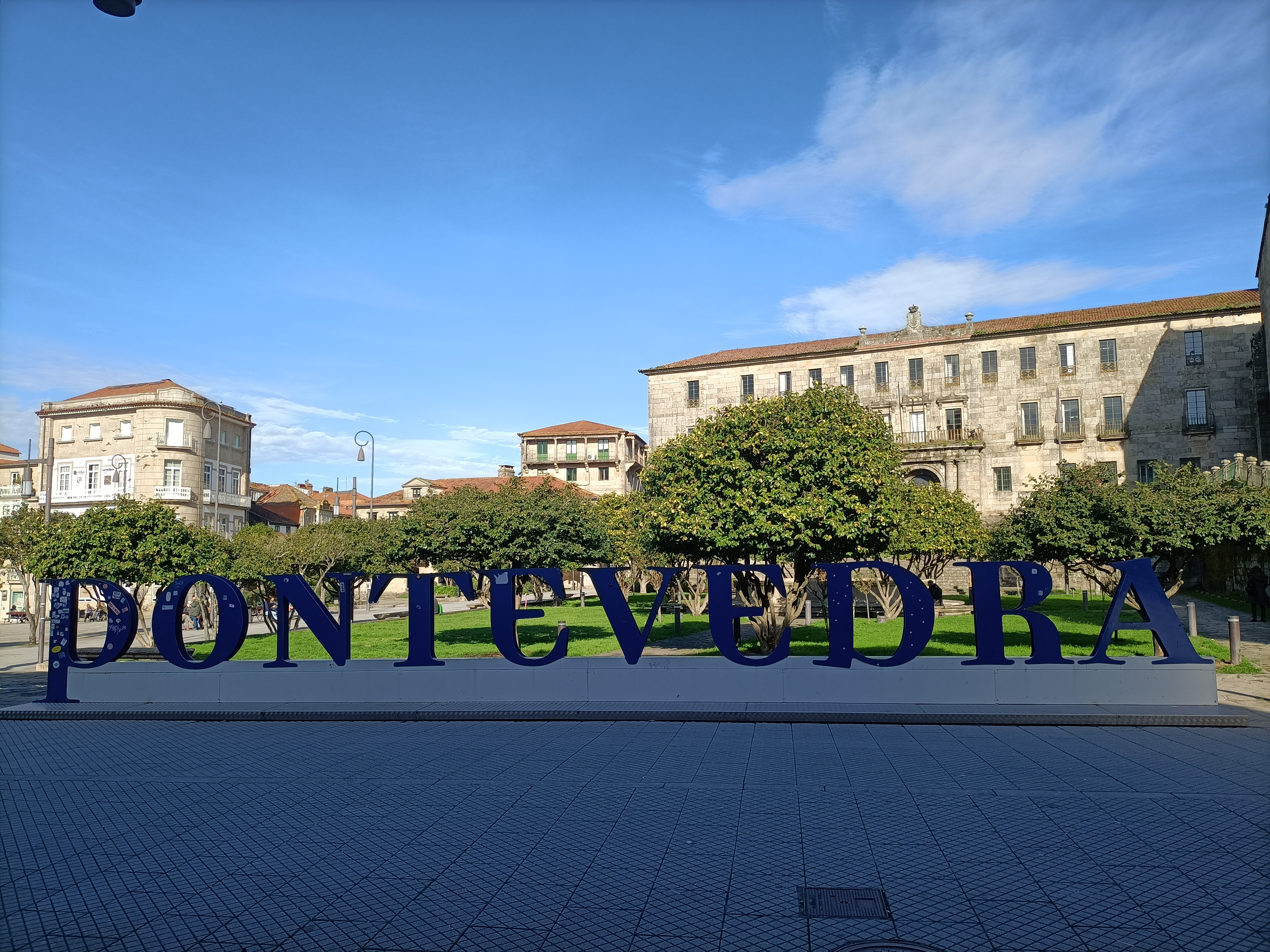
Tourist sign

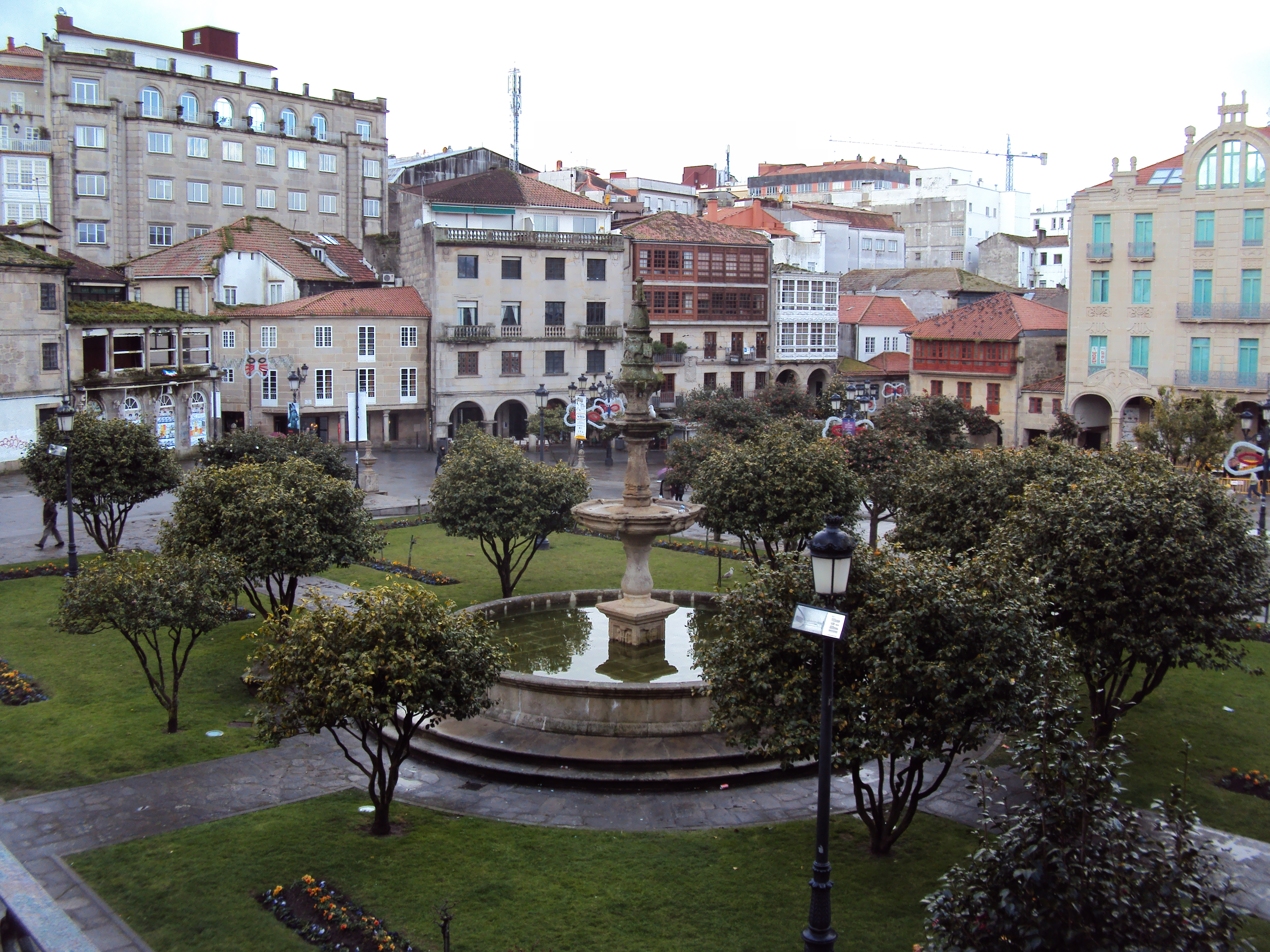
Fountain in the middle of the gardens

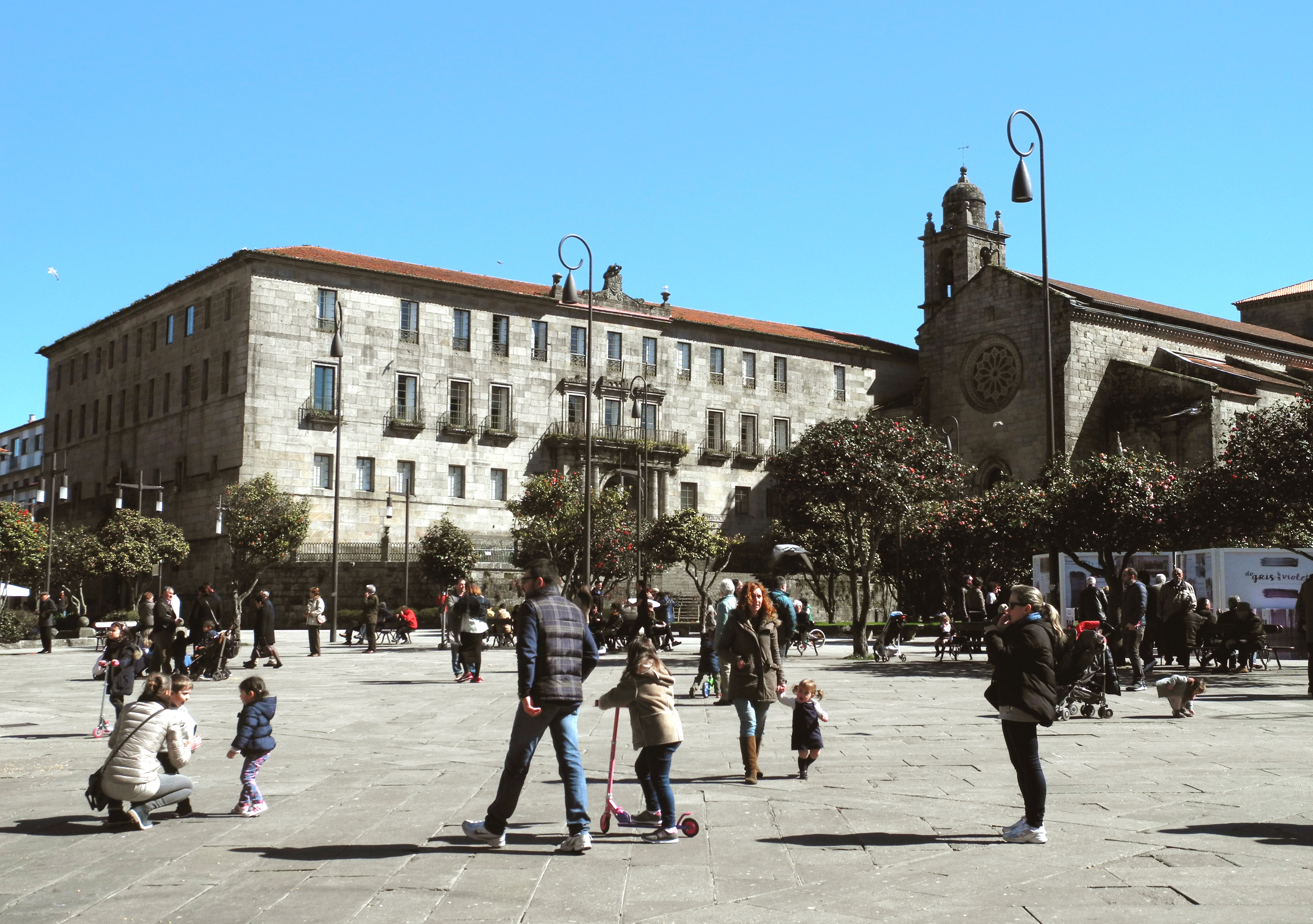
Square and St. Francis Convent

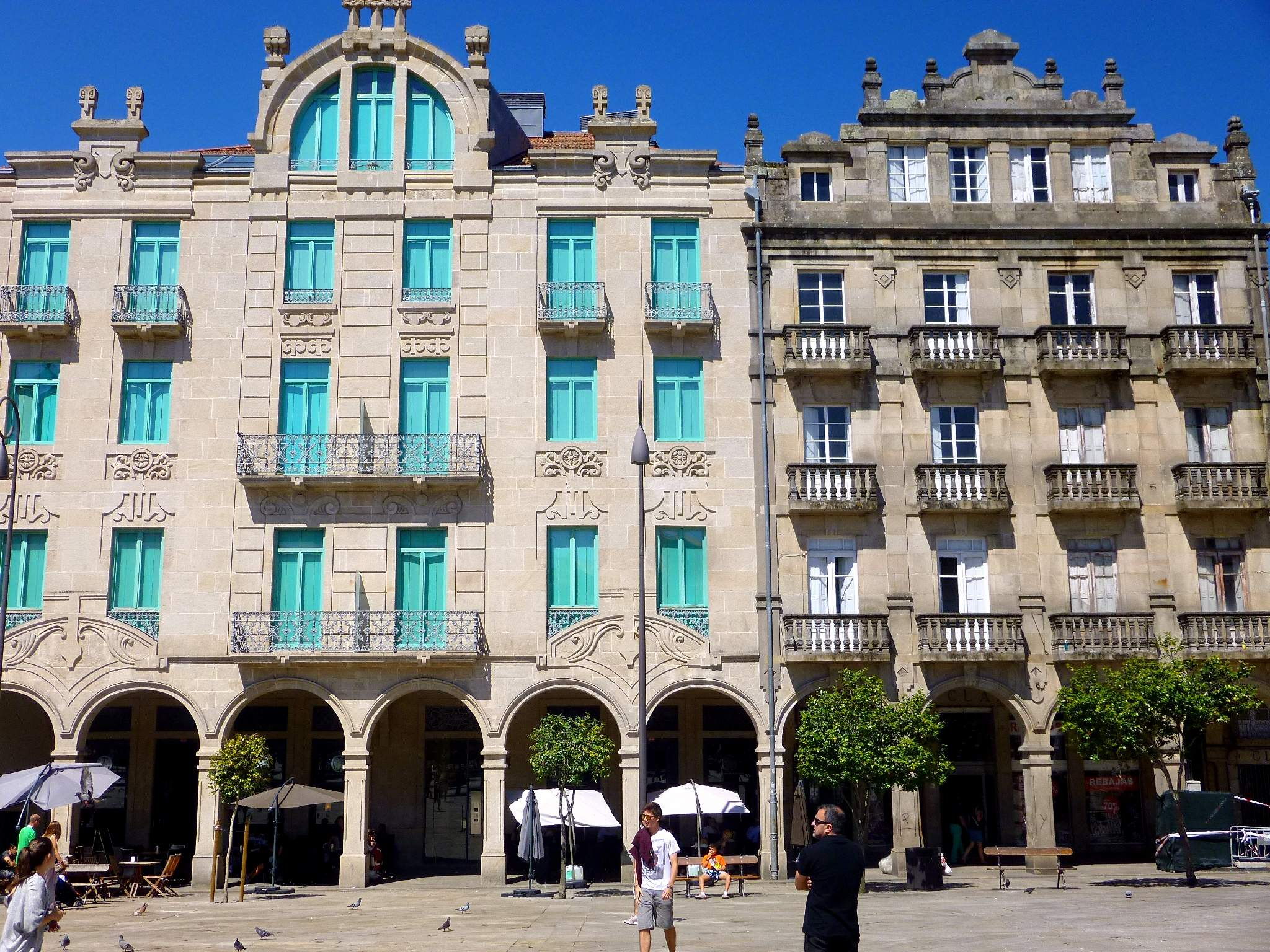

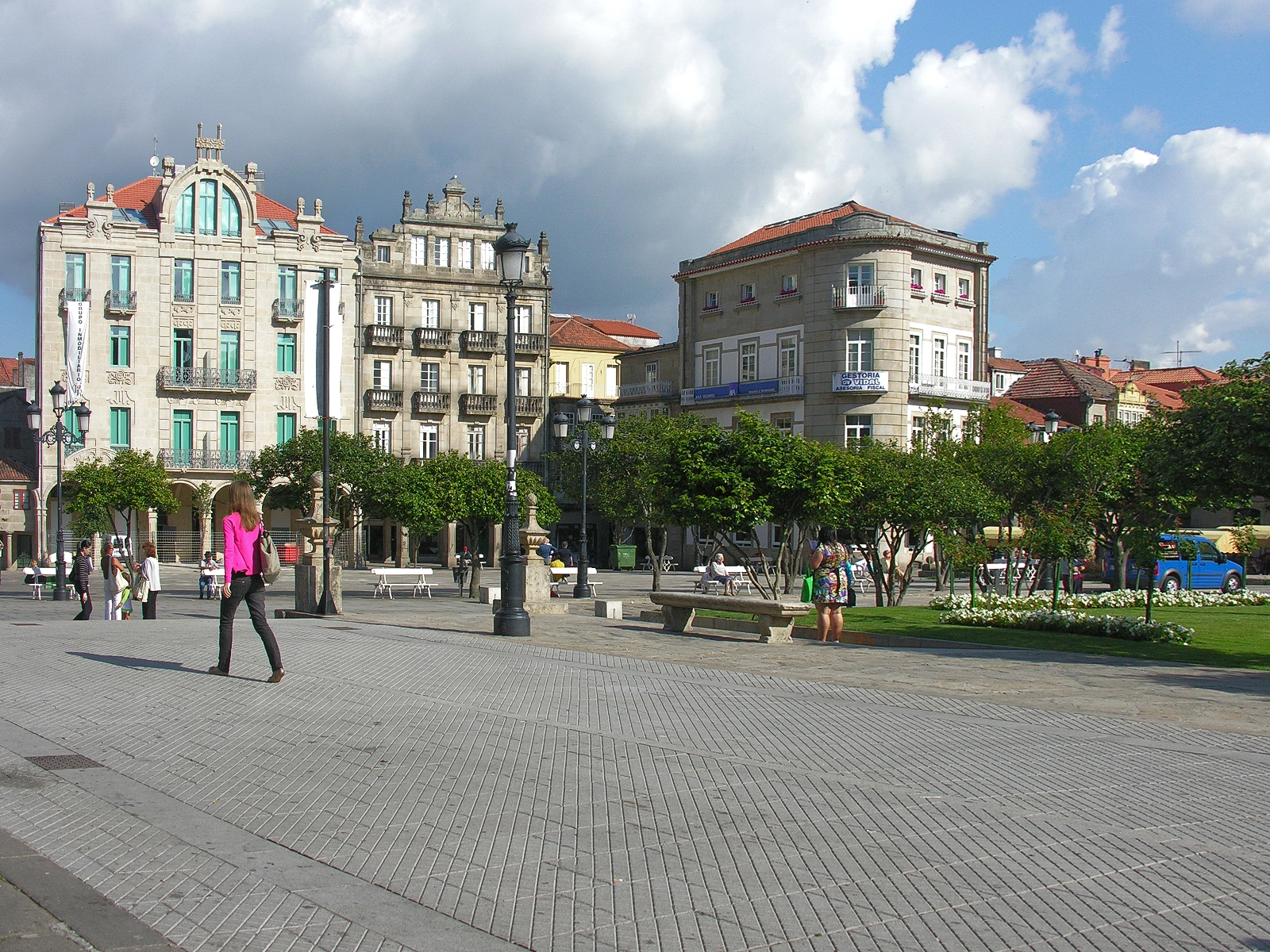

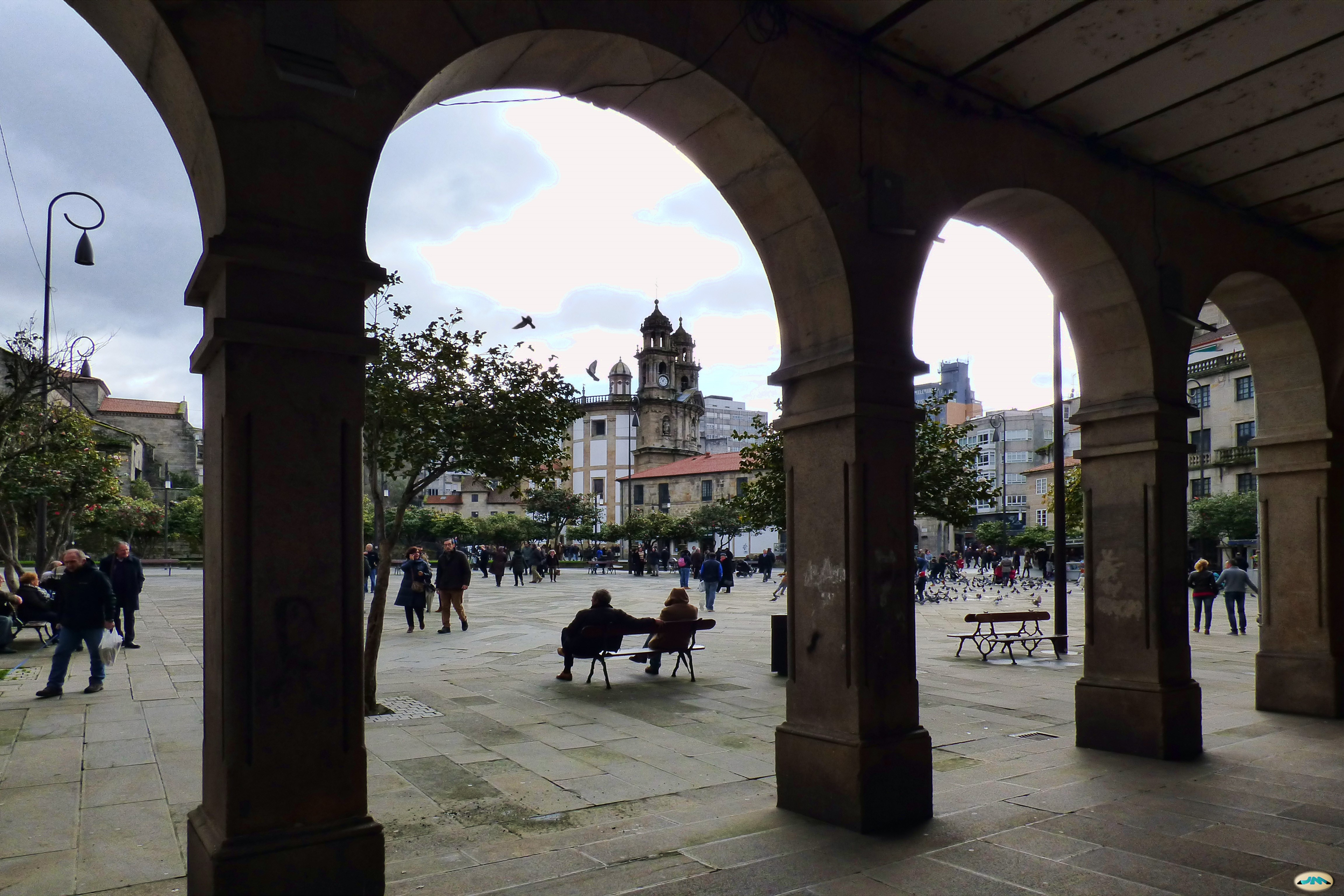
Square arcades

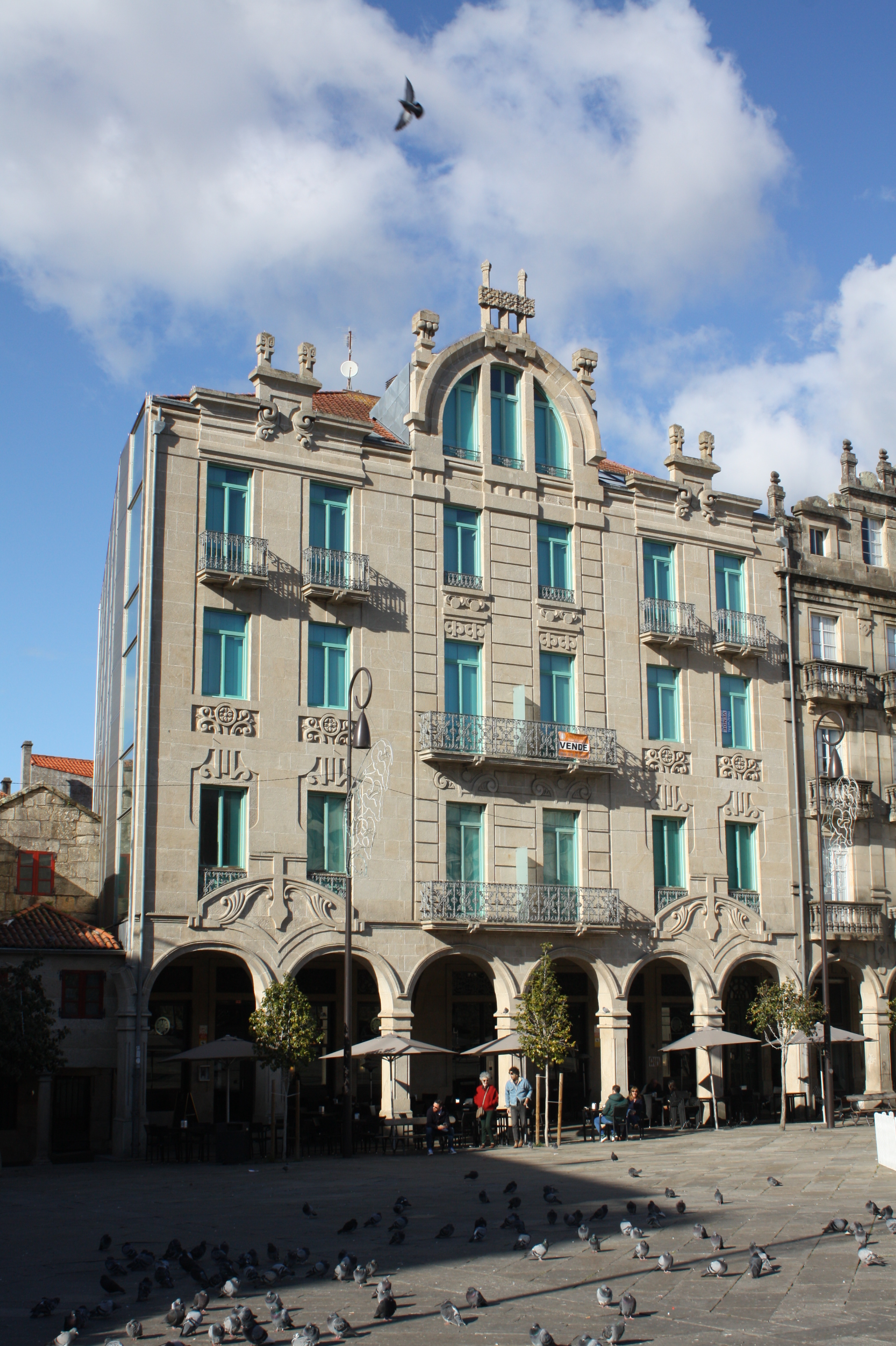
Pigeons in the square

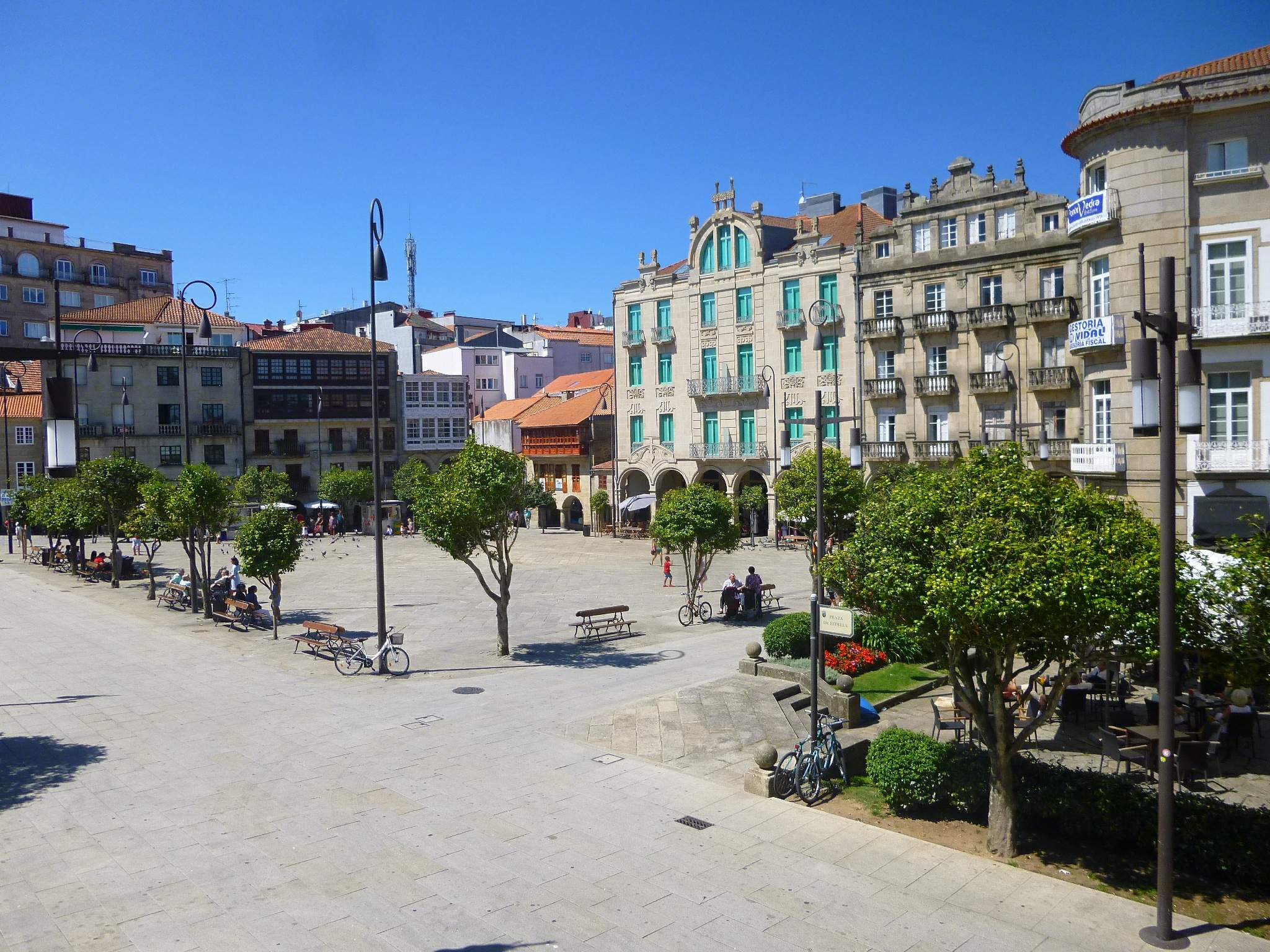

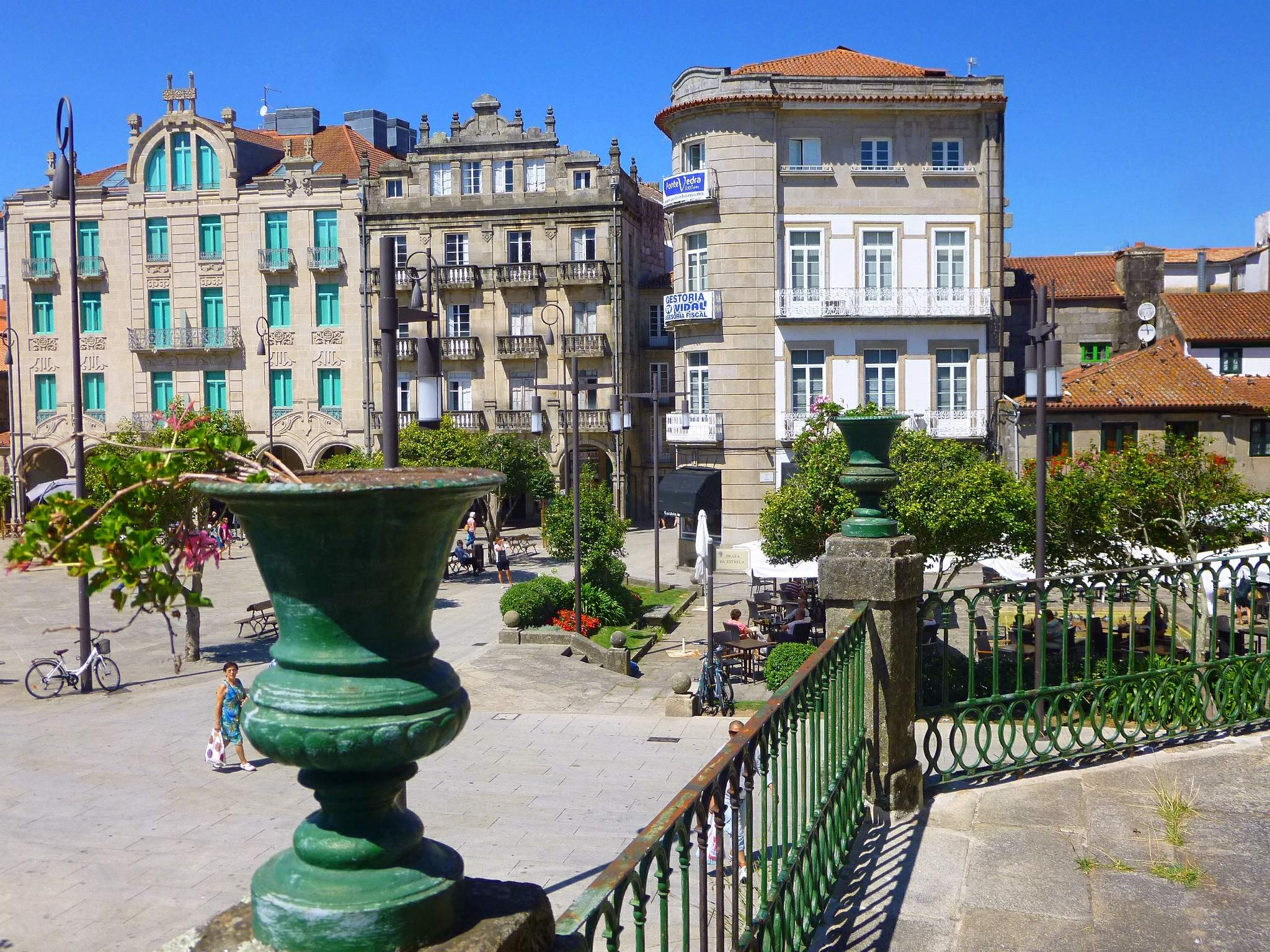

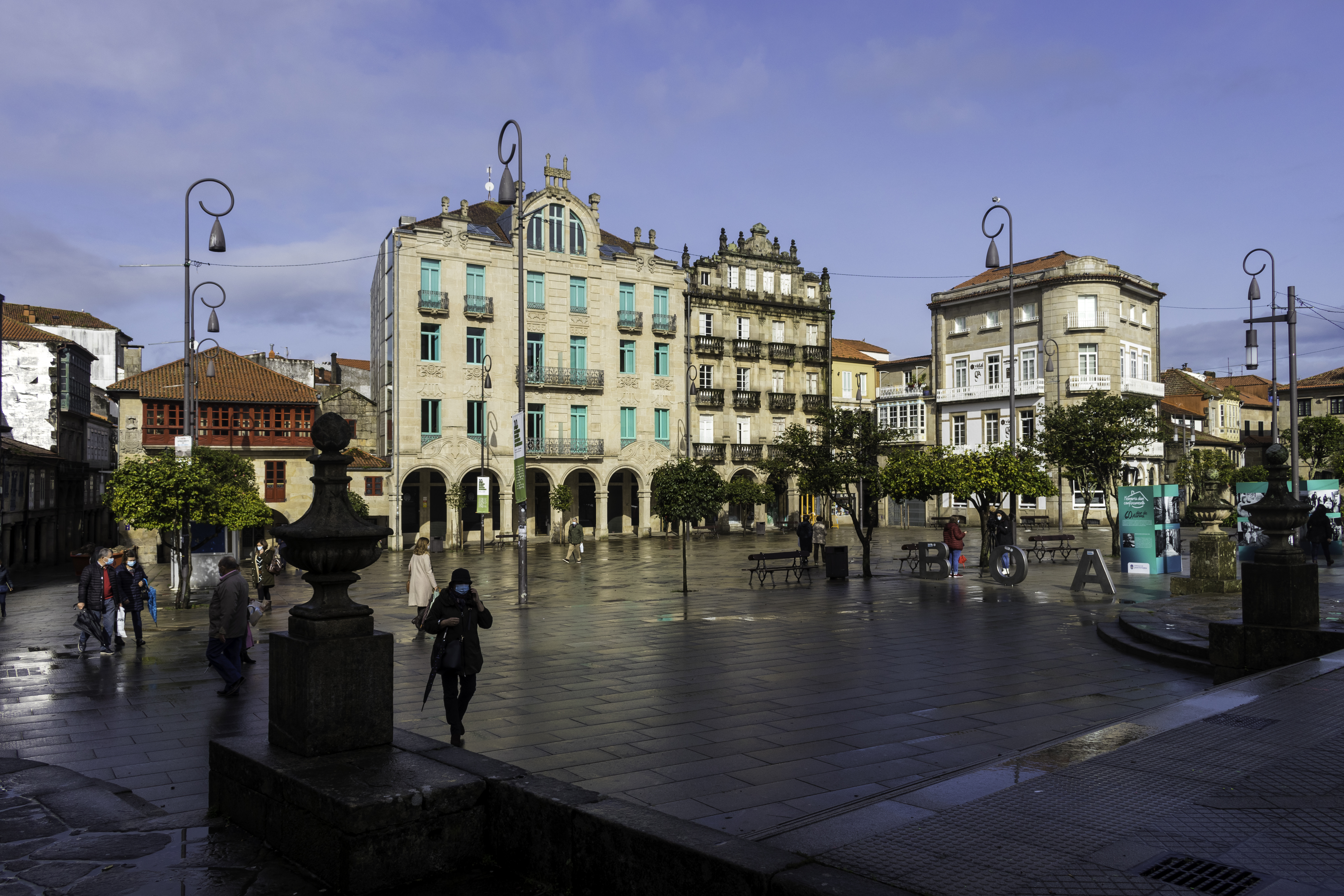
Square in 2000

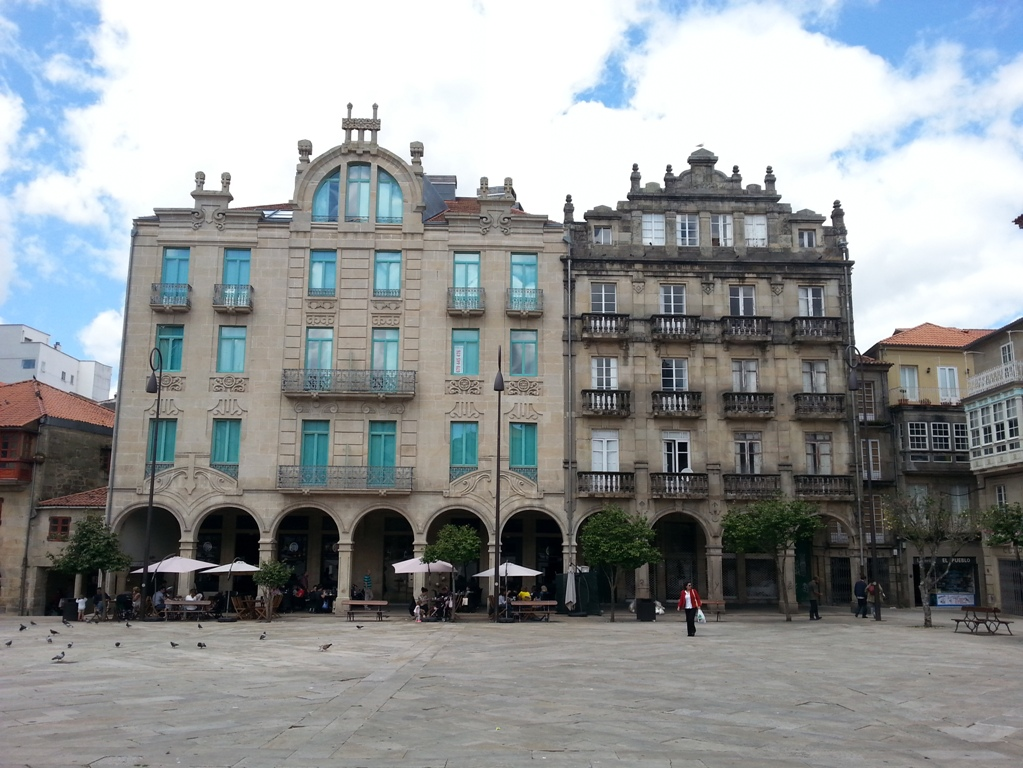
Art Nouveau buildings

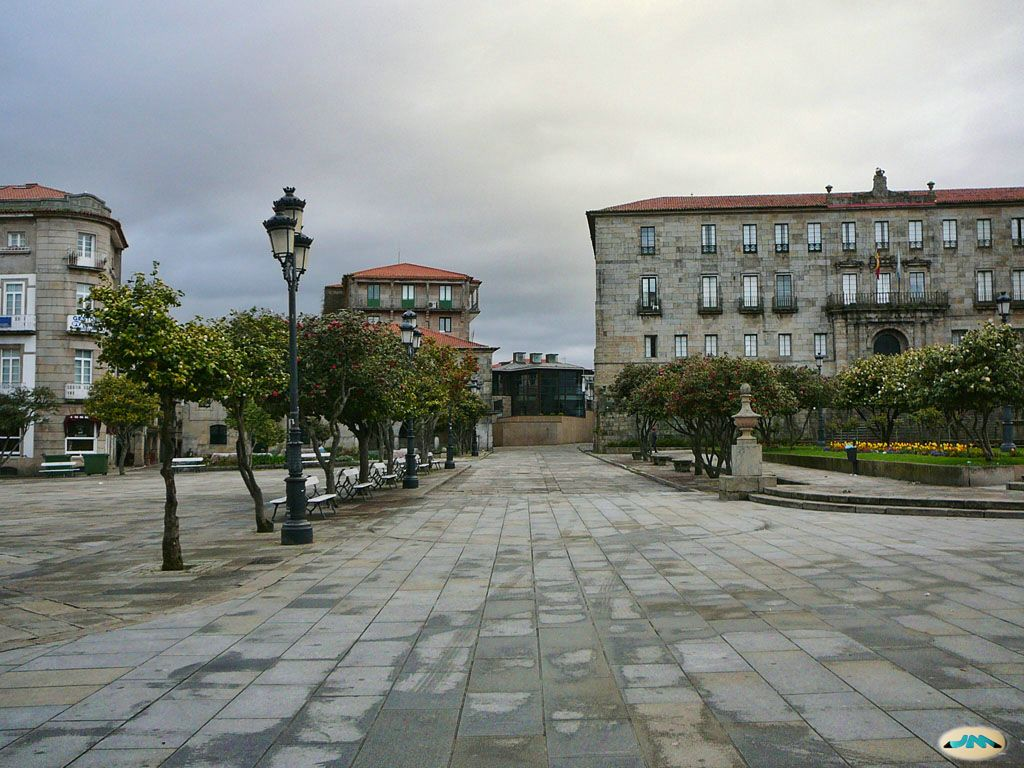

== Bibliography ==
- Aganzo, Carlos (2010). Pontevedra. Ciudades con encanto (in Spanish). Madrid: El País-Aguilar. pp. 42–44. ISBN 978-8403509344.
- Fontoira Surís, Rafael (2009). Pontevedra monumental (in Galician). Pontevedra: Diputación de Pontevedra. p. 439; 516. ISBN 9788484573272.
- Fortes Bouzán, Xosé (2011). Pontevedra. Burgo, villa, capital (in Spanish). Brión-A Coruña: Guiverny. p. 388. ISBN 978-84-939449-1-9.
- Nadal, Paco (2012). Rias Baixas. Escapadas (in Spanish). Madrid: El País-Aguilar. p. 32. ISBN 978-8403501089.
- Riveiro Tobío, Elvira (2008). Descubrir Pontevedra (in Spanish). Pontevedra: Edicións do Cumio. pp. 36–37. ISBN 9788482890852.

== See also ==
=== Related articles ===
- Fountain of A Ferrería
- Convent and the Gothic church of San Francisco
- Casa de las Caras
- Pontevedra Feira Franca
- Calle Benito Corbal
