= Casa de las Caras (Pontevedra) =

Baroque house in Pontevedra, Spain

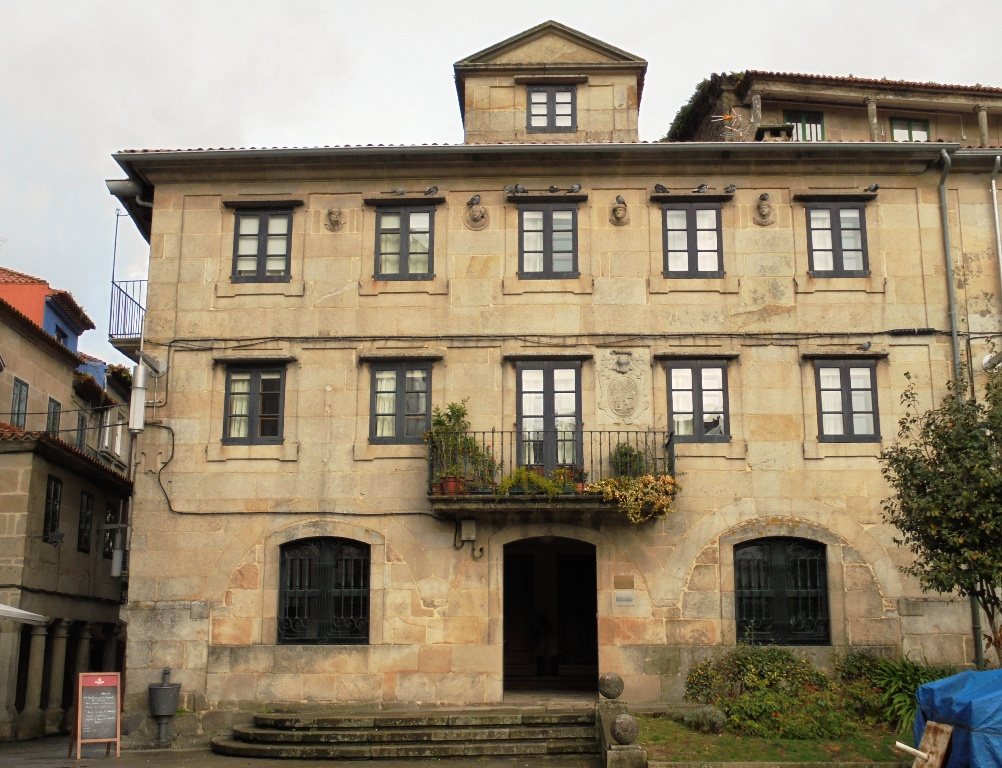
- Interactive map of the Casa de las Caras area

General information
- Type: House
- Location: Pontevedra, Galicia, Spain
- Coordinates: 42°25′54.12″N 8°38′38.04″W

Technical details
- Floor count: 2

The Casa de las Caras (House of the Heads), also known as the Pazo de Barbeito y Padrón, is a 16th-century building in the heart of the historic centre of Pontevedra, Spain. It is known as the House of the Heads because of the Renaissance busts that decorate its façade on the upper floor.

== Location ==
The building is located at Plaza de la Estrella 4, north of the Plaza de la Herrería in Pontevedra, Spain.

== History ==
The Casa de las Caras was built by order of D. Juan Barbeito y Padrón at the end of the 16th century to serve as his home. Later, it became the property of D. Pedro Aldao, a brave military man, Grandmaster of Campo. Due to the Barbeito's links with the Aldaos, the house was passed on with the Majorat to the Gayoso-Aldao and from them to the Counts of San Román and the Marquises of Atalaya. It had four façades, the two main ones facing the Plaza de la Estrella and Figueroa Street and two others facing the present garden at the back. The house was remodelled in the 18th and 19th centuries, when it took on its current configuration.

The house was for a long time a post house and outside the house the horses were tied to horseshoes on the façade, while the travellers rested. In the 18th century, when the inn La Estrella was built next door, the house was transformed. In 1725, a long balcony was built on one side of the house.

In the 19th century, the arches of the main façade of the Plaza de la Estrella, which originally had arcades, were blinded. This blinding would have been carried out between 1840 and 1860 to make the building more stable. The large side balcony on Figueroa Street was also set back. From 1880 to 1908, the house was the home and laboratory of the prestigious photographer Francisco Zagala, one of the first chroniclers of the city.

In the 20th century, the photographer Ramón Barreiro rented it in 1910 on his return from emigration from Mexico. On the ground floor he has set up his photography studio. When the Trade Union building was built, the architect Enrique Barreiro was obliged to complete the common façade of both buildings.

In the mid-1980s, his grandson, the current architect and owner of the building, carried out a complete renovation to turn the house into his residence. During this remodelling, elements of the building's architecture were recovered.

== Description ==
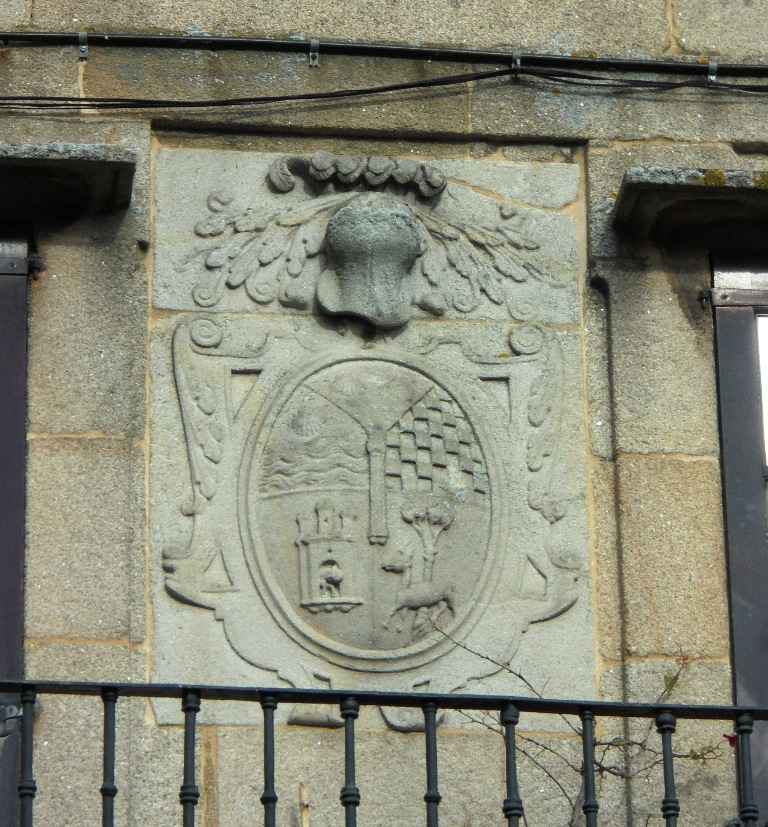
Casa de las Caras coat of arms

The house has a square floor plan and is baroque in style. It has a sober 18th century facade with two floors and a ground floor. The two upper floors have five windows with upper and lower decorative edges.

Among the windows on the second floor of the main façade there are four Renaissance busts from the 16th century whose meaning is uncertain. The most accepted theory is that they belong to the noble family of Barbeito and Padrón who owned the pazo. One of these figures is wearing glasses. These Medallions with effigies or stone heads are the origin of the popular name of the building.

In the centre of the first floor there is a balcony next to which is the coat of arms of Juan Barbeito y Padrón, in which the arms of the Padrón, Mariño, Valladares and Barbeito lineages are distributed.

On the main façade, the outline of the original arcades can still be seen, which have been blinded. On the side facade there is a balcony that is extended to fit Figueroa Street. On the rear façade, the current owner has recovered some large Corbels during the renovation, as well as the drain spouts on the side of the cavalry. Inside, the house has fireplaces on different floors but on the same level. The fireplaces have two different draughts for each of them.

== Culture ==
The history of the Casa de las Caras appears in the novel Xa vai o griffón no vento, by the writer Alfredo Conde, where the characters who live there are linked to the Spanish Inquisition. Bartolomé, the son of Juan Barbeito y Padrón, was appointed Grand Inquisitor in 1678.

At number 30, Real Street, there is another house with ten heads on its façade, which also belonged to the Barbeito family.

== Gallery ==
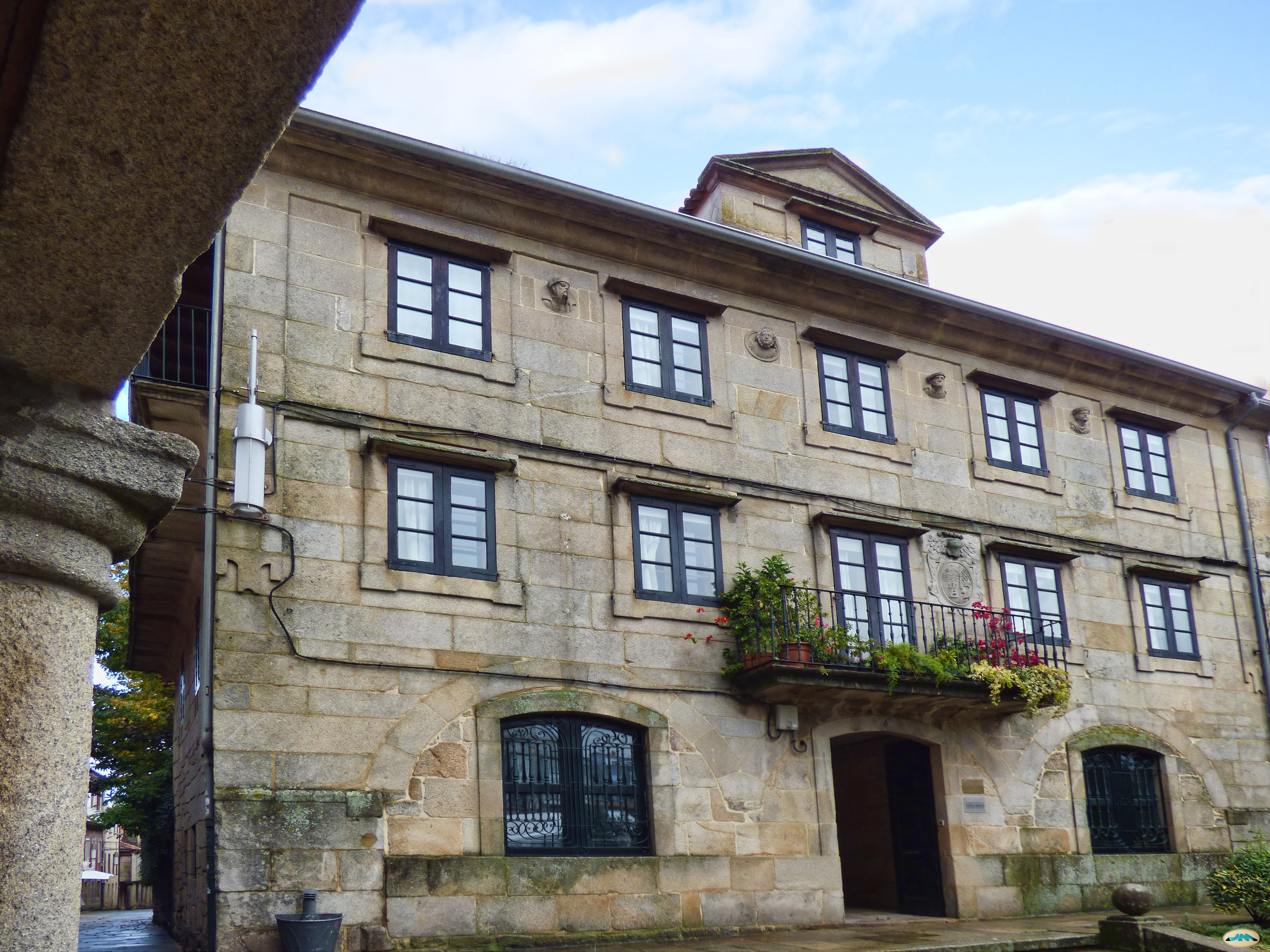
Façade

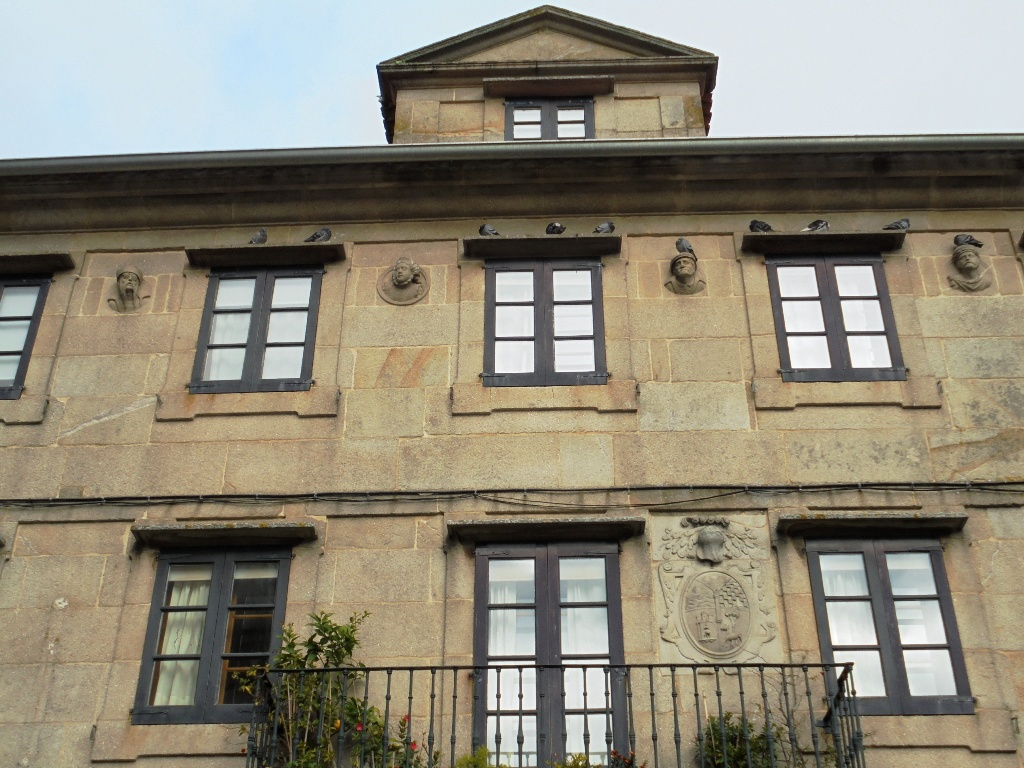
Detail on the façade

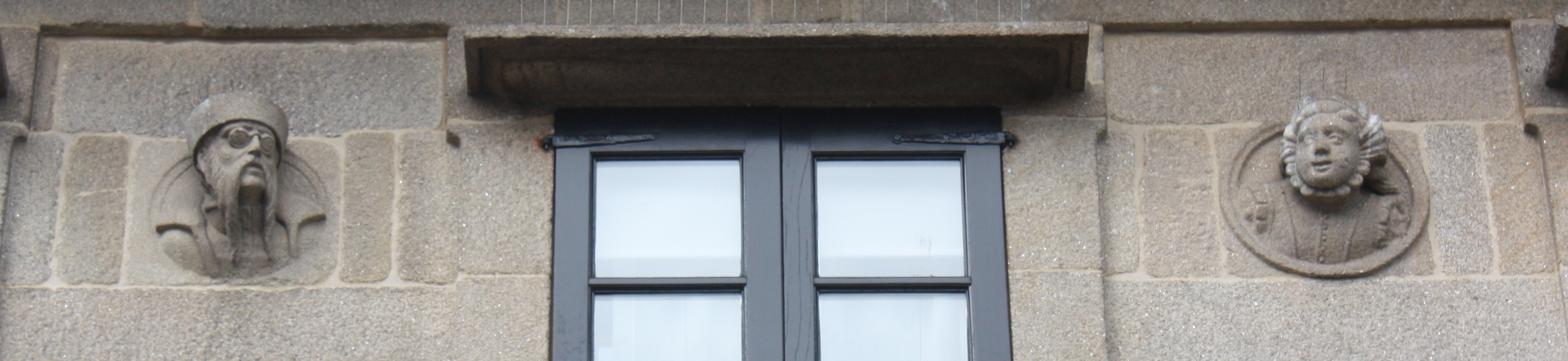
Two of the heads on the front, the first with glasses

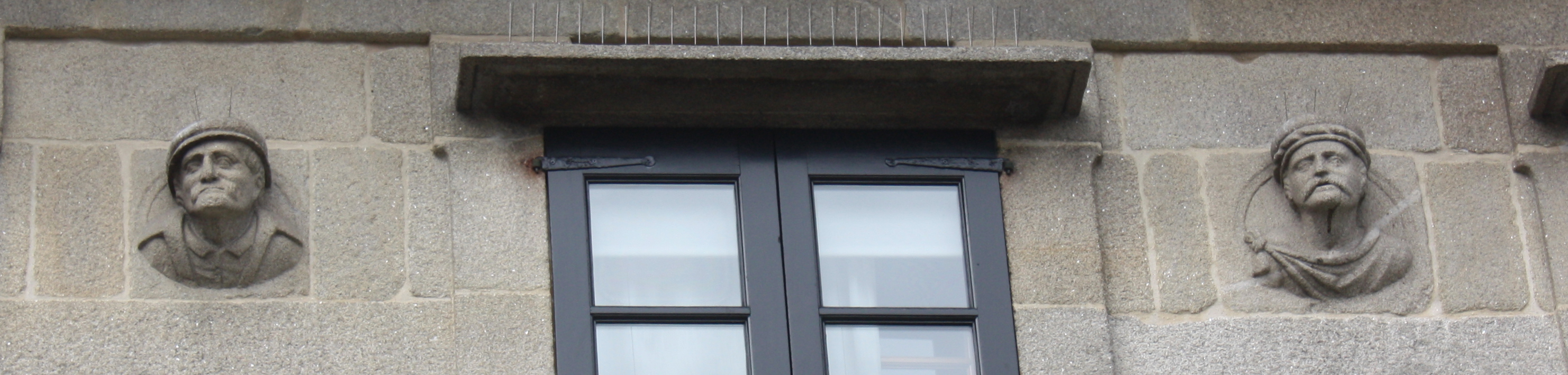
Two more heads on the façade

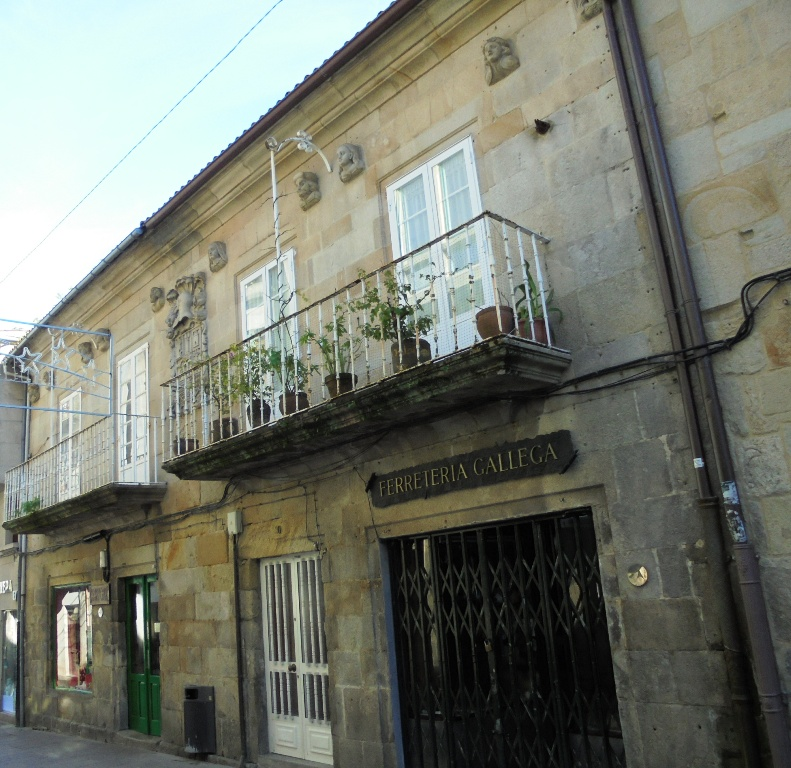
House of the Barbeito and Padrón family with ten busts on the façade, Real Street

== Bibliography ==
- Aganzo, Carlos (2010). Pontevedra. Ciudades con encanto (in Spanish). Madrid: El País-Aguilar. pp. 43–44. ISBN 978-8403509344.
- Fontoira Surís, Rafael (2009). Pontevedra monumental (in Spanish). Pontevedra: Diputación Provincial de Pontevedra. p. 232. ISBN 978-84-8457-327-2.
- Riveiro Tobío, Elvira (2008). Descubrir Pontevedra (in Spanish). Pontevedra: Edicións do Cumio. p. 22. ISBN 9788482890852.

== See also ==
=== Related articles ===
- Casa de las Campanas
- Mendoza Mansion
- Villa Pilar

=== External links ===
- Casa de las Caras, on the website Galicia Tourism
- Casa de las Caras on the website Visit-Pontevedra
