= Fountain of A Ferrería =

Monumental fountain in Pontevedra, Spain

- Fuente de la Herrería (Spanish); Fonte da Ferrería (Galician)
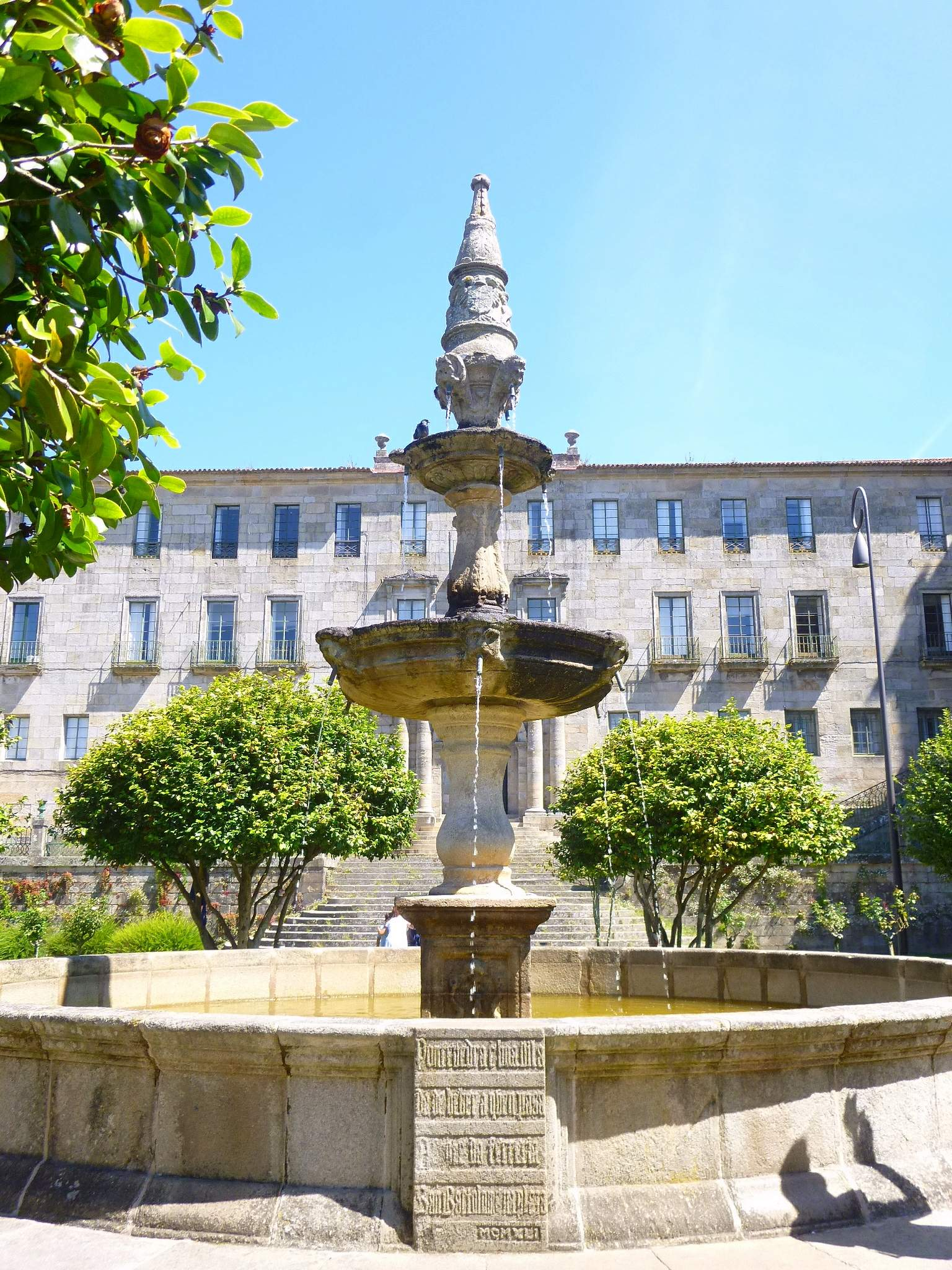
- Interactive map of Fountain of A Ferrería
- Coordinates: 42°25′52.7″N 8°38′37.3″W
- Designer: João Lopes
- Type: fountain
- Material: granite
- Beginning date: 1537
- Opening date: 1554

The Fountain of A Ferrería is a fountain located in the gardens of Casto Sampedro next to the Ferrería square in the Spanish city of Pontevedra. It is a Renaissance-style granite fountain.

== History ==
The Ferrería Fountain dates back to the 16th century, when Pontevedra was the most populous city in Galicia. The construction of the fountain was financed by King Charles V in 1537. The aim of the work was to install a fountain in the town, next to the Portuguese Way, in order to provide drinking water for pilgrims on their way to Santiago de Compostela and to remedy the water shortage, which was particularly acute in the summers. The fountain, designed by João Lopes, a Portuguese from Oporto, who also designed similar fountains in Caminha (1551) and Viana do Castelo (1554) (Portugal), with the contribution of Domingo Fernández from Santiago de Compostela, was to be "of the same workmanship, size, height and with the perfections and execution of the main fountain in the town square of Caminha", according to an agreement by the Pontevedra Town Council.

The Ferrería fountain was completed in 1554 and installed in the south-western part of the Ferrería square, now paved, near the Trabancas gate of the Pontevedra walls, through which pilgrims on their way to Santiago de Compostela entered the walled enclosure.

To maintain the fountain, the town council signed agreements with specialists, the first known plumber being Francisco Gonçalves, who was paid 6,000 maravedis a year in 1597. Various laws and decrees were also enacted to prohibit the washing of clothes and animal intestines in the fountain, as well as the watering of horses. To this end, the fountain basin was surrounded by a protective circle with four entrances, and a sort of trough was built.

In the 18th century, the fountain was restored on the initiative of the syndic Félix Raimundo de Soto. The cost of repairs and the water supply amounted to almost ten thousand reals. In 1857, for health reasons, the Pontevedra City Council decided to move the fountain from the Ferrería square and place it in front of the Saint Ferdinand barracks. However, although the fountain was dismantled, it was not moved and remained in the care of the Pontevedra Archaeological Society. Its parts were deposited in the convent of Saint Dominic.

In 1928, thanks to the interest of Castelao, who lived in Pontevedra, and Casto Sampedro, a lawyer and founder of the Pontevedra Archaeological Society, the fountain was recovered and installed in Casto Sampedro's gardens, in front of the Convent of Saint Francis. The fountain was fully restored in 2010.

== Description ==
The Ferrería fountain, as shown by the symbolism engraved in the stone, fulfils its function as a fountain dedicated in particular to pilgrims on the Portuguese Way to Santiago de Compostela.

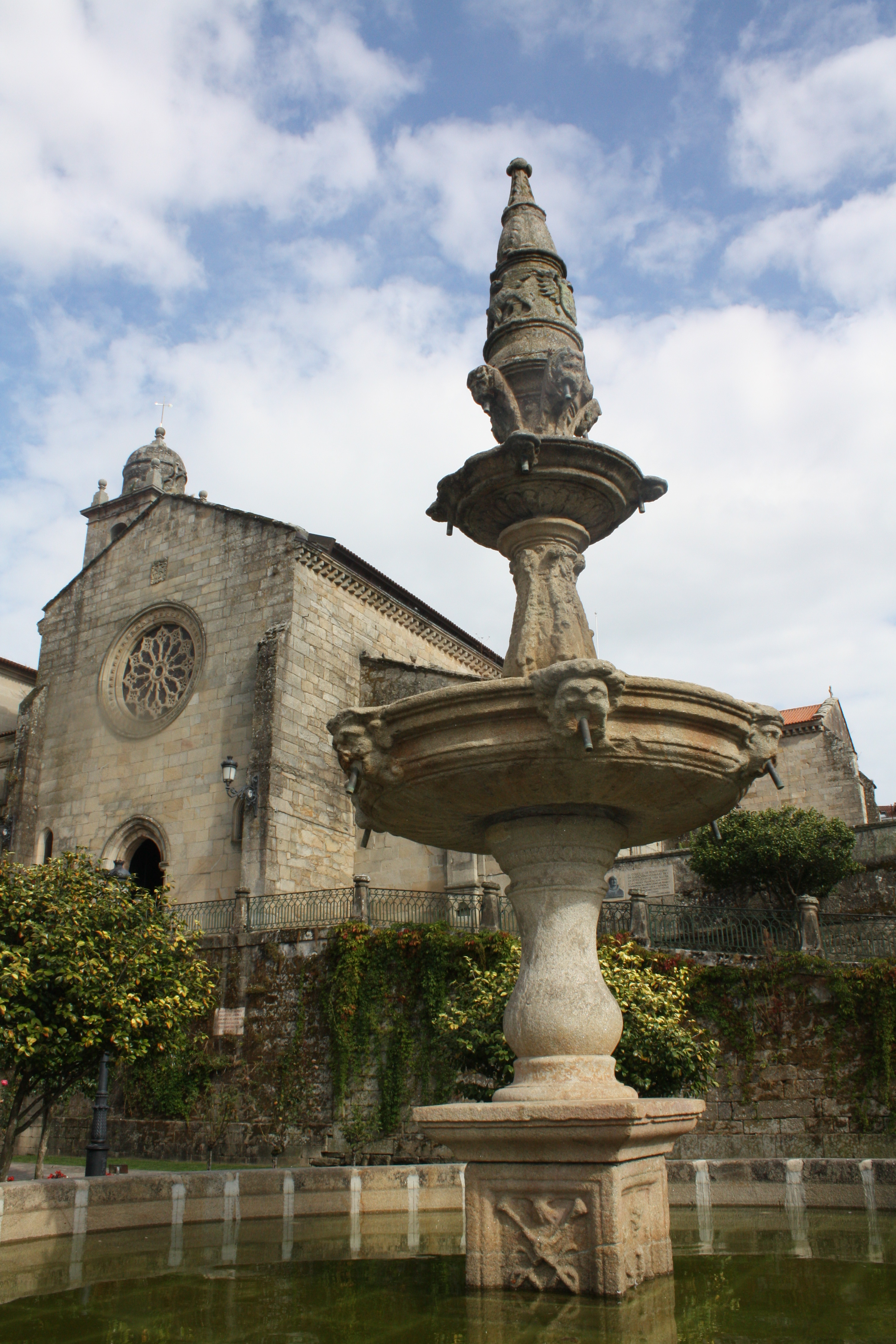
The fountain in 2011

Inspired by Portuguese fountains, the fountain has 14 spouts on three different levels. It is set in the centre of a large circular granite basin. A pillar with a total of three sections rises from the central axis, topped by a crowning piece. The first of the three bodies rests on a quadrangular base. The second body houses a basin that collects water from another small basin above. This basin on the second body is emptied by pipes that emerge from the mouths of four sculpted mythological figures. On the third section, which crowns the fountain, are two coats of arms, one with the coat of arms of King Charles V, with the double-headed eagle of the House of Habsburg, and on the reverse the city's coat of arms held by griffins, which is the oldest representation of the city's coat of arms that exists in Pontevedra. There are also sculptures of four other heads of mythological figures with pipes coming out of their mouths and flowing into the small upper basin.

The fountain's internal plumbing is made of copper pipes. The verses of the famous popular song dedicated to the hospitality of Pontevedra are inscribed on a stone slab attached to the west side of the basin. The fountain has ornamental lighting.

The Ferrería fountain, which greatly impressed the Córdoban Ambrosio de Morales, master and chronicler of Philip II, was defined by him as follows: "In the Saint Francis Square, there is a fountain which, for its size, height and gilding, can rival the fountains of Cordoba.

== The fountain in popular culture ==
Because of its usefulness in supplying water to pilgrims and the people of Pontevedra, the latter dedicated a famous popular song in Galician to it, underlining the hospitality of the city of Pontevedra:

PONTEVEDRA É BOA VILA
DÁ DE BEBER A QUEN PASA.
A FONTE NA FERRERÍA,
SAN BARTOLOMÉ NA PRAZA.

Pontevedra is a good city
Give a drink to those who pass by,
The fountain in A Ferrería
St Bartholomew's in the square

== See also ==
=== Bibliography ===
- Aganzo, Carlos (2010). Pontevedra. Ciudades con encanto (in Spanish). Madrid: El País-Aguilar. p. 44. ISBN 978-8403509344.
- García Bujalance, Guillermo (2016). "Heráldica de la zona monumental de Pontevedra". Hidalguía: la revista de genealogía, nobleza y armas (in Spanish) (682): 702. ISSN 0018-1285.
- Nieto González, Remigio (1980). Pontevedra. Guía monumental ilustrada (in Spanish). Pontevedra: Asociación de comerciantes de la calle Manuel Quiroga. p. 20.
- Riveiro Tobío, Elvira (2008). Descubrir Pontevedra (in Spanish). Pontevedra: Edicións do Cumio. p. 22. ISBN 9788482890852.

=== Related articles ===
- Praza da Ferrería
- Old town of Pontevedra
- Glorieta de Compostela
