= Pontevedra Feira Franca =

Medieval festival in Pontevedra, Spain

Feira Franca de Pontevedra
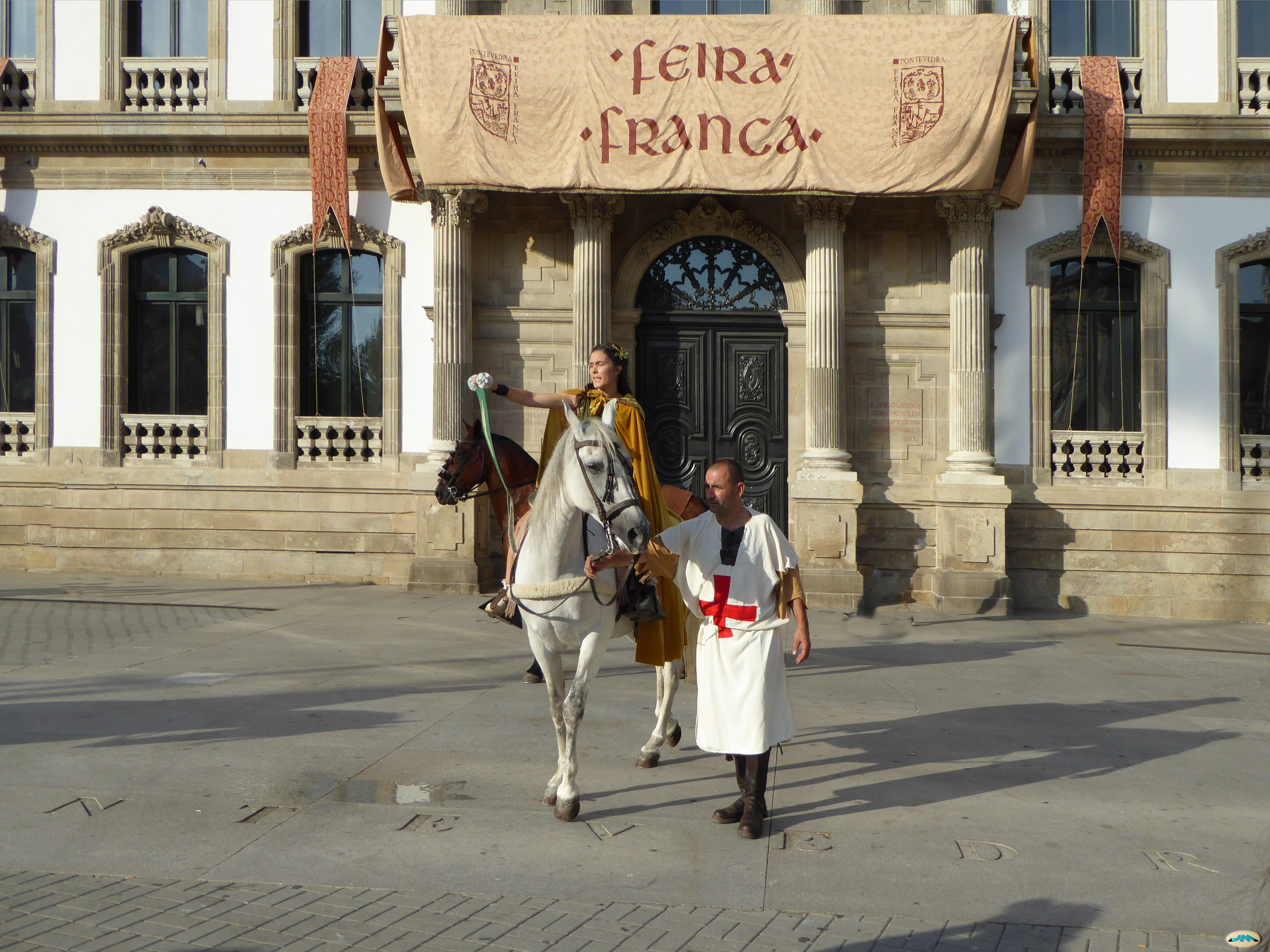
- Pontevedra during the 2016 Feira Franca
- Observed by: Pontevedra, Spain
- Observances: equestrian jousting, street entertainment, theatre, leather, wood and textile crafts, falconry shows, traditional river boats, wine transport, juggling
- Date: first Friday and Saturday in September
- Frequency: annual

The Feira Franca is a medieval festival held in Pontevedra (Spain) on Friday afternoon and Saturday of the first weekend in September. It is set in the Middle Ages and includes a medieval market, a chivalry tournament, falconry shows, food stalls, street entertainment, juggling, music, workshops, leather, wood, textile and natural products crafts, and more.

In 2013, it was declared a festival of tourist interest by the Galician Government. Today, it brings together some 100,000 people who dress up in period costumes to take part in the festivities.

== Location ==
The Feira Franca de Pontevedra takes place in the historic centre of the city, in the Alameda de Pontevedra, the Gran Vía de Montero Ríos, the Palm Trees Park and Queen Victoria Avenue, the Pontevedra Bullring and in the area around the Burgo Bridge and the Lérez River.

== History ==
The Feira Franca has its origins in the tax-free market, which began to take place in the city through a royal privilege established by King Henry IV in 1467, with the celebration of a month-long festival around 24 August in honour of Saint Bartholomew. In the medieval Fairs, the highest and lowest social classes met.

The first edition took place in 2000, and has since attracted a large number of visitors. People wear medieval-inspired costumes and the old town centre undergoes a major aesthetic transformation. Locals and visitors are encouraged to join in the festivities with carts and horses in the streets, prisoners on the gallows or with Blacksmiths and other medieval characters.

For several years now, each fair has been dedicated to a theme. In 2006 it was dedicated to the Irmandiños, in 2007 to the sea and in 2008 to agriculture. In the tenth edition in 2009 the Fair was named Love, Mockery and Curses, in homage to the medieval songs made in the Galician language. In 2010 the theme was walkers, in 2011 old-time trade and in 2012 popular games. In 2013, it is devoted to Inventions, in 2014 to astronomy, in 2015 to alchemy, in 2016 to music, in 2017 to medieval bestiaries and in 2018 to legends. In 2019 the Feira Franca focused on the Lérez River. In 2022 the central theme was also the Lérez River and in 2023 it was dedicated to numbers.

== Description ==
=== Characters ===
Pontevedra's inhabitants and visitors come together during the festival to recreate the representative characters of Pontevedra's society in 1467 and the atmosphere of that medieval period. The different social classes are represented, such as ladies and knights, bishops of the clergy and peasants, as well as the different typical crafts through craftsmen, minstrels, troubadours, musicians, artists, merchants, fishing net weavers, linen weavers, potters, coopers, basket makers, blacksmiths, carpenters and lace weavers.

=== Activities ===
The different historical and recreational activities recreate and evoke the medieval atmosphere of the city in the second half of the 15th century, when it was the most important city in Galicia.

The festival opens with the proclamation on Friday afternoon of the town criers on horseback through the historic centre of the city. This is followed by parades of jesters, jugglers and troubadours. A key activity is the representation of the wine transport, which evokes the arrival of wine in the city from the Ribeiro area in the province of Ourense, which was exported to Spain and abroad from the city's medieval port.

Other activities include medieval tournaments and jousting in the bullring, falconry, archery and fencing demonstrations, traditional music and dance performances, demonstrations of medieval crafts, games and shows, medieval food tasting at street stalls, meals for groups of diners in the street around large tables set up for this purpose in different parts of the historic centre of the city and in the Alameda de Pontevedra and the exhibition of traditional boats between the Burgo Bridge and the Currents Bridge.

=== Setting ===
The streets and squares are set and decorated with banners, pennants and coats of arms hanging from the façades and bands of cloth draped aerially over the streets, straw bales and other props and a medieval castle. Some of the gates of the old medieval city wall are also reconstructed in papier-mâché, such as the Alhóndiga or Santo Domingo gate, the Santa Clara or Rocheforte gate and the Trabancas gate.

== Gallery ==
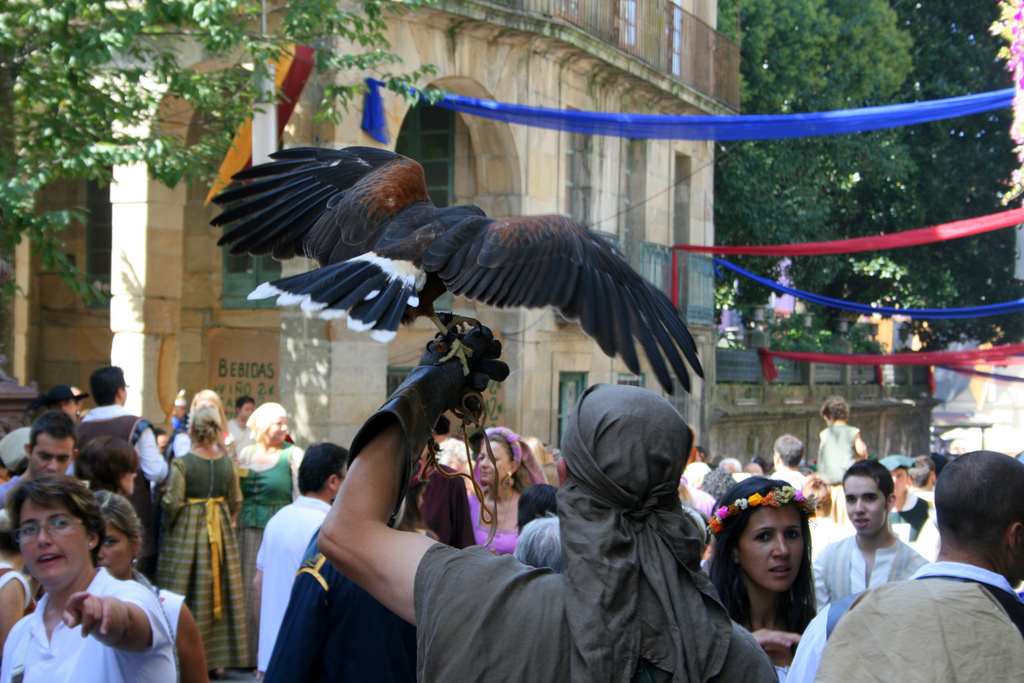
Falconry show

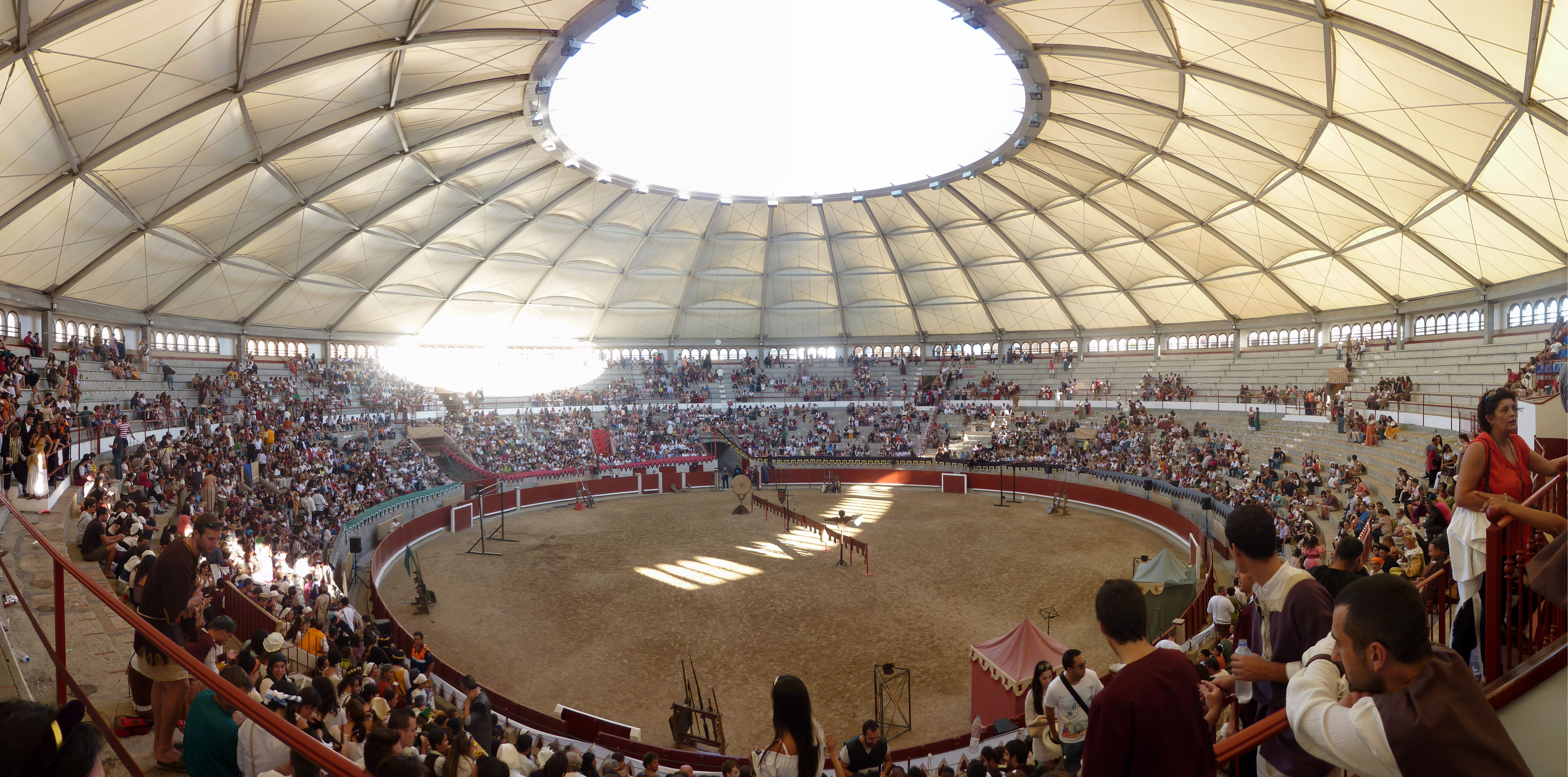
Equestrian jousting in the arena

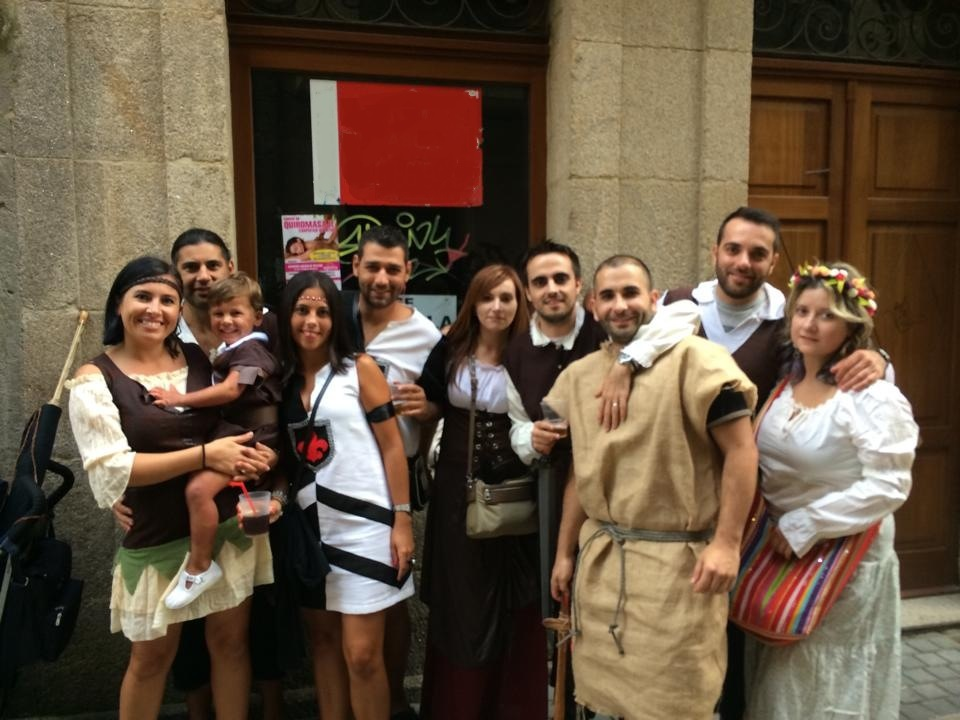
Group of visitors dressed in medieval clothing

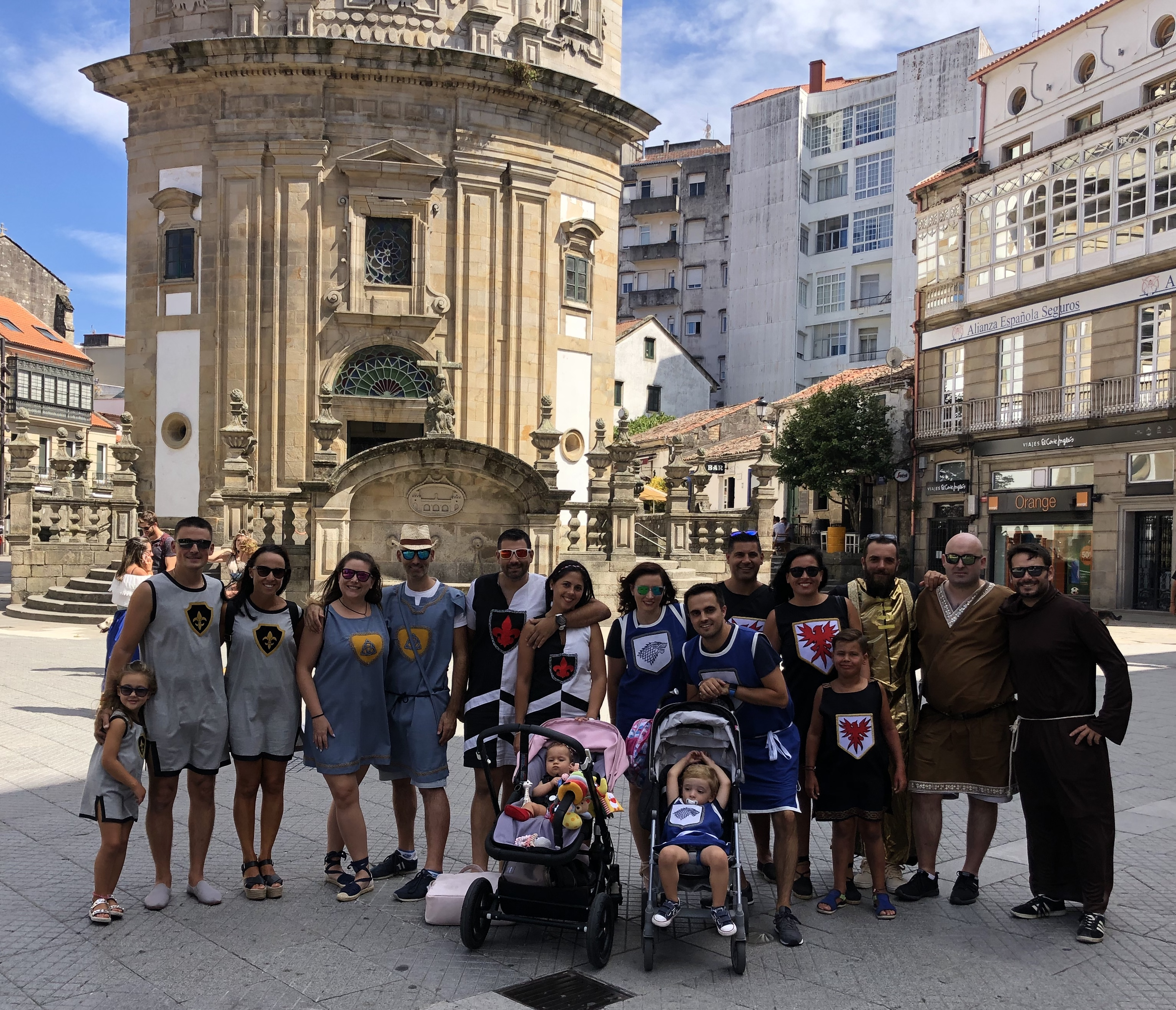
Group of friends at Feira Franca 2019

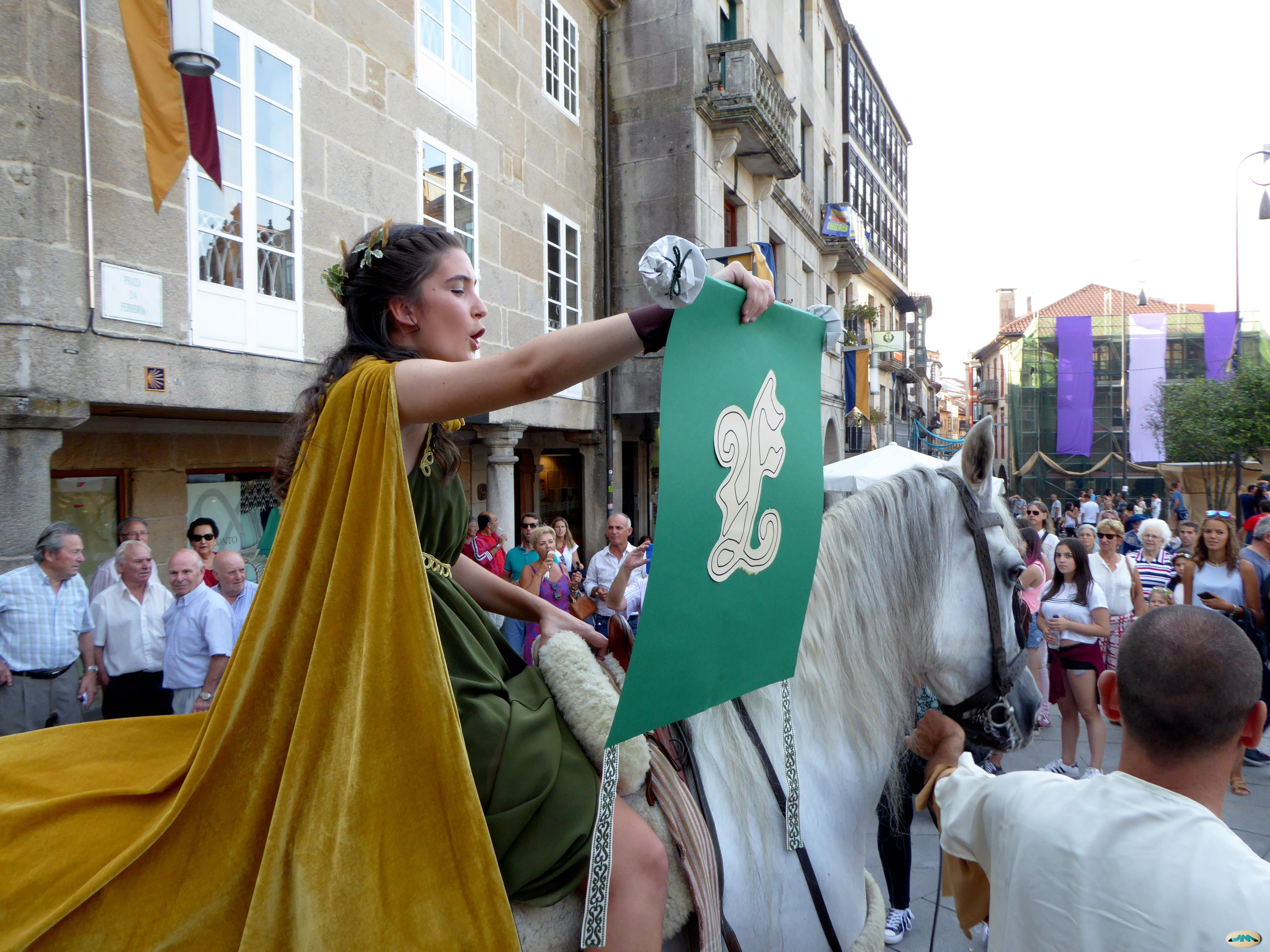
Speech

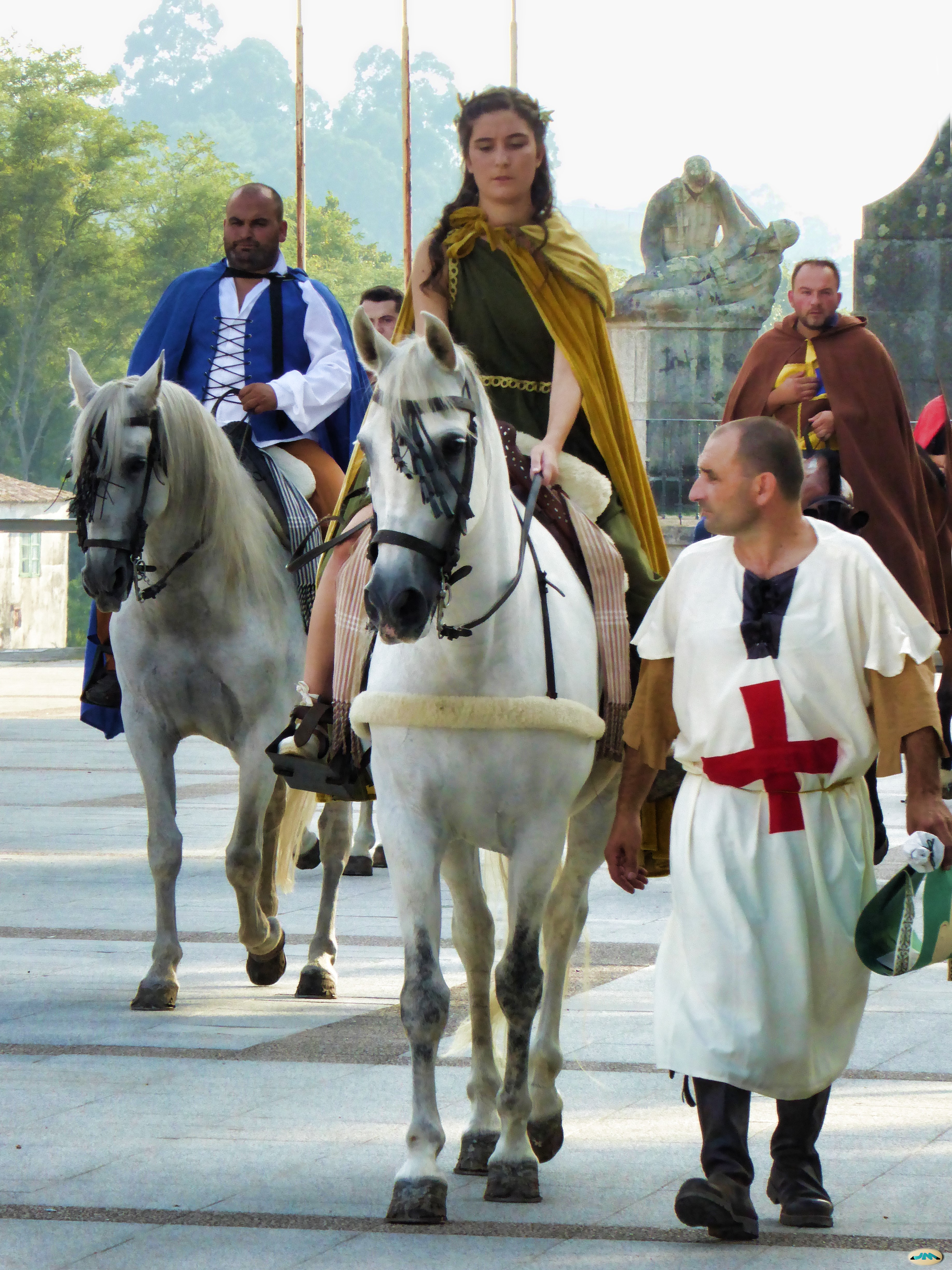
Ladies and gentlemen

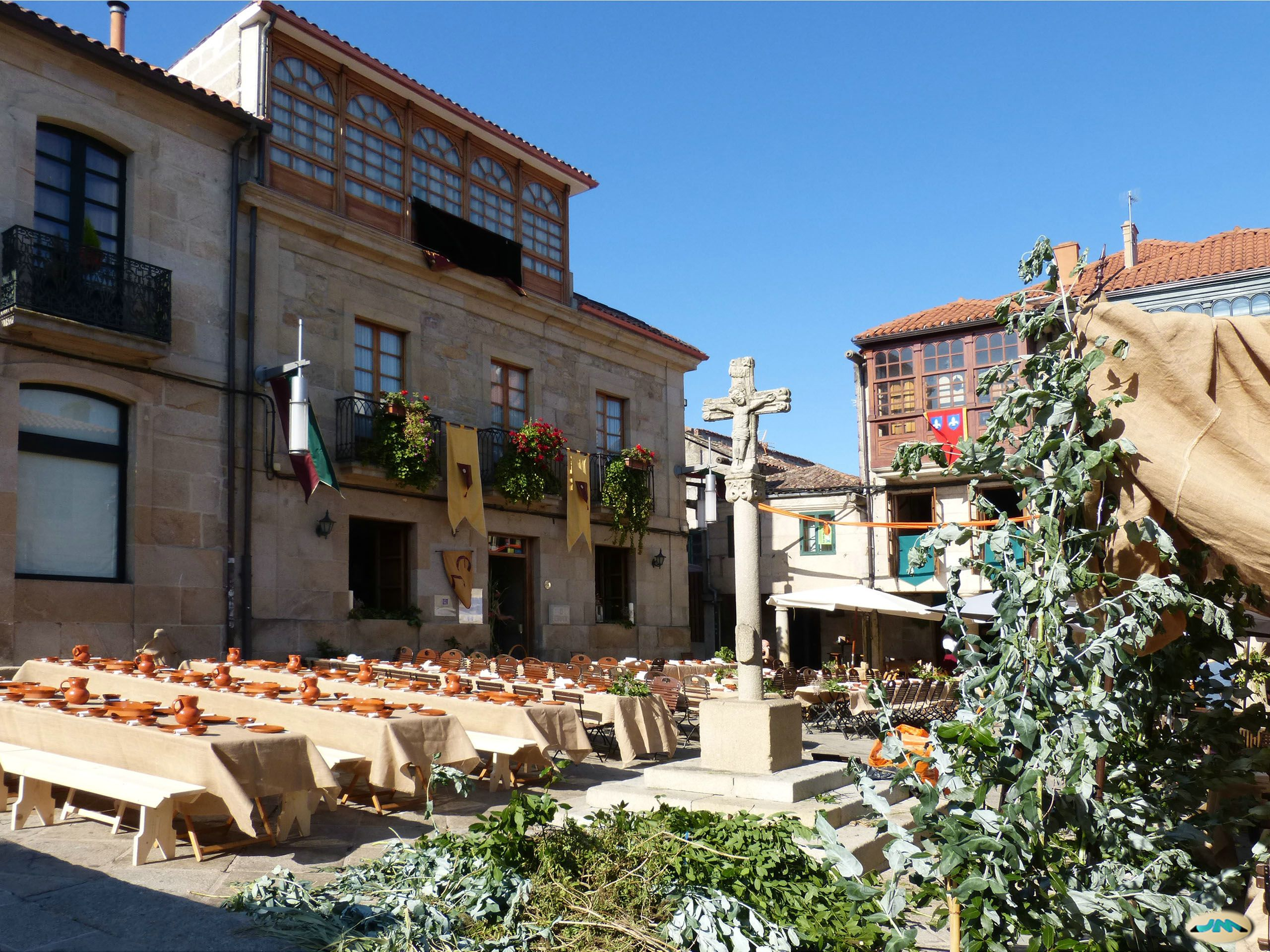
Dining tables

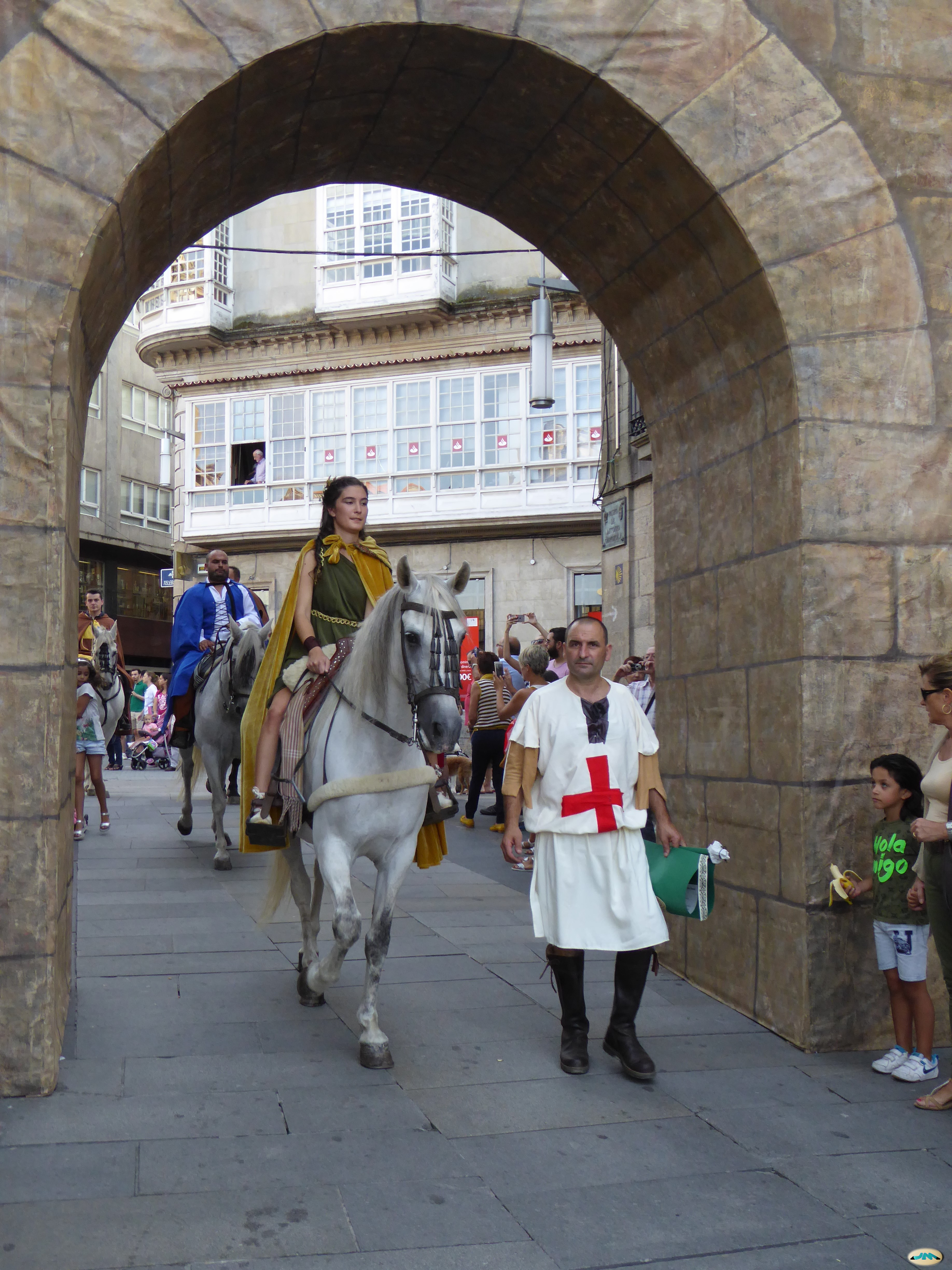
Trabancas Gate of the walls of Pontevedra

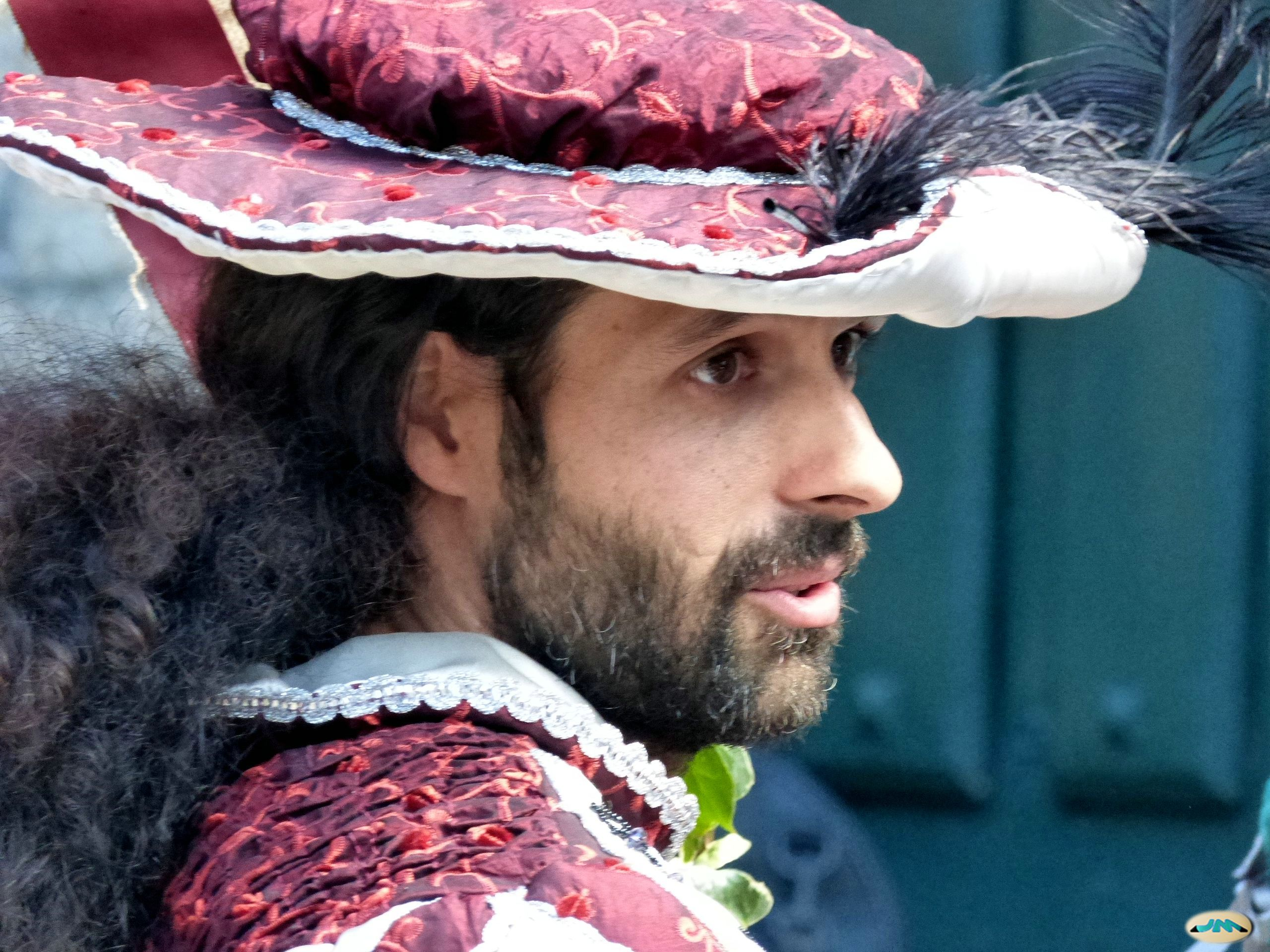
Courtesan

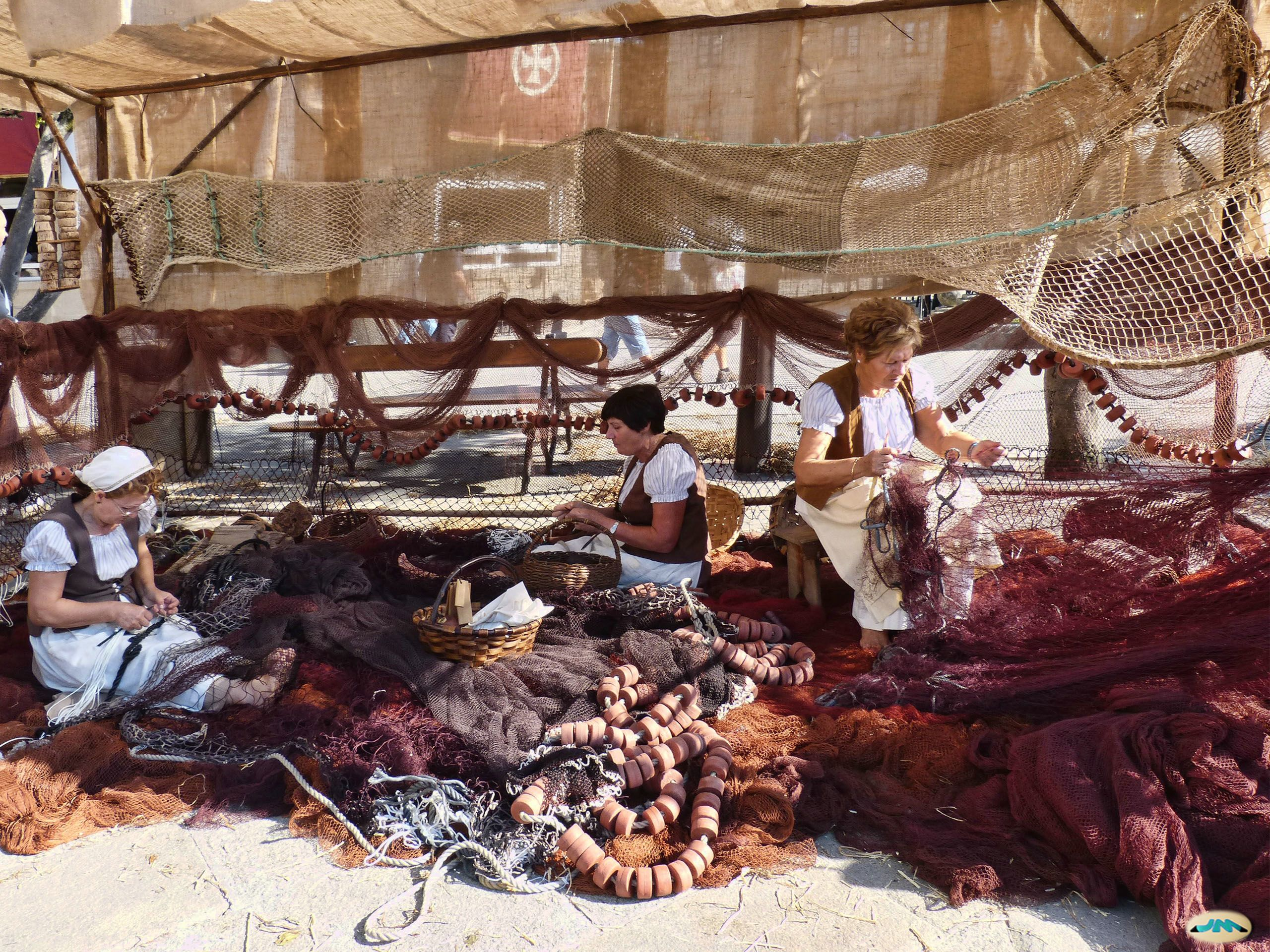
Weavers of fishing nets

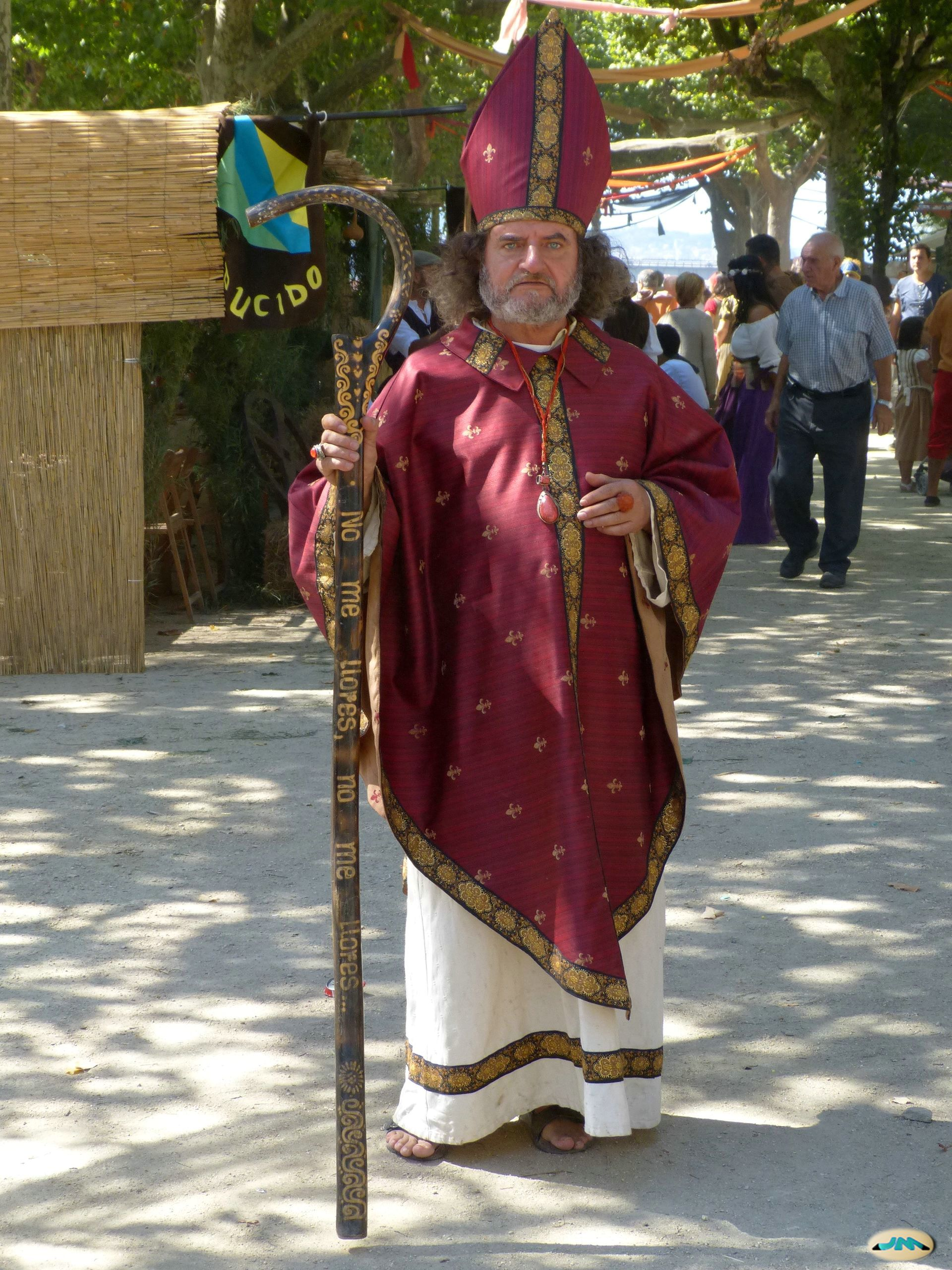
Bishop

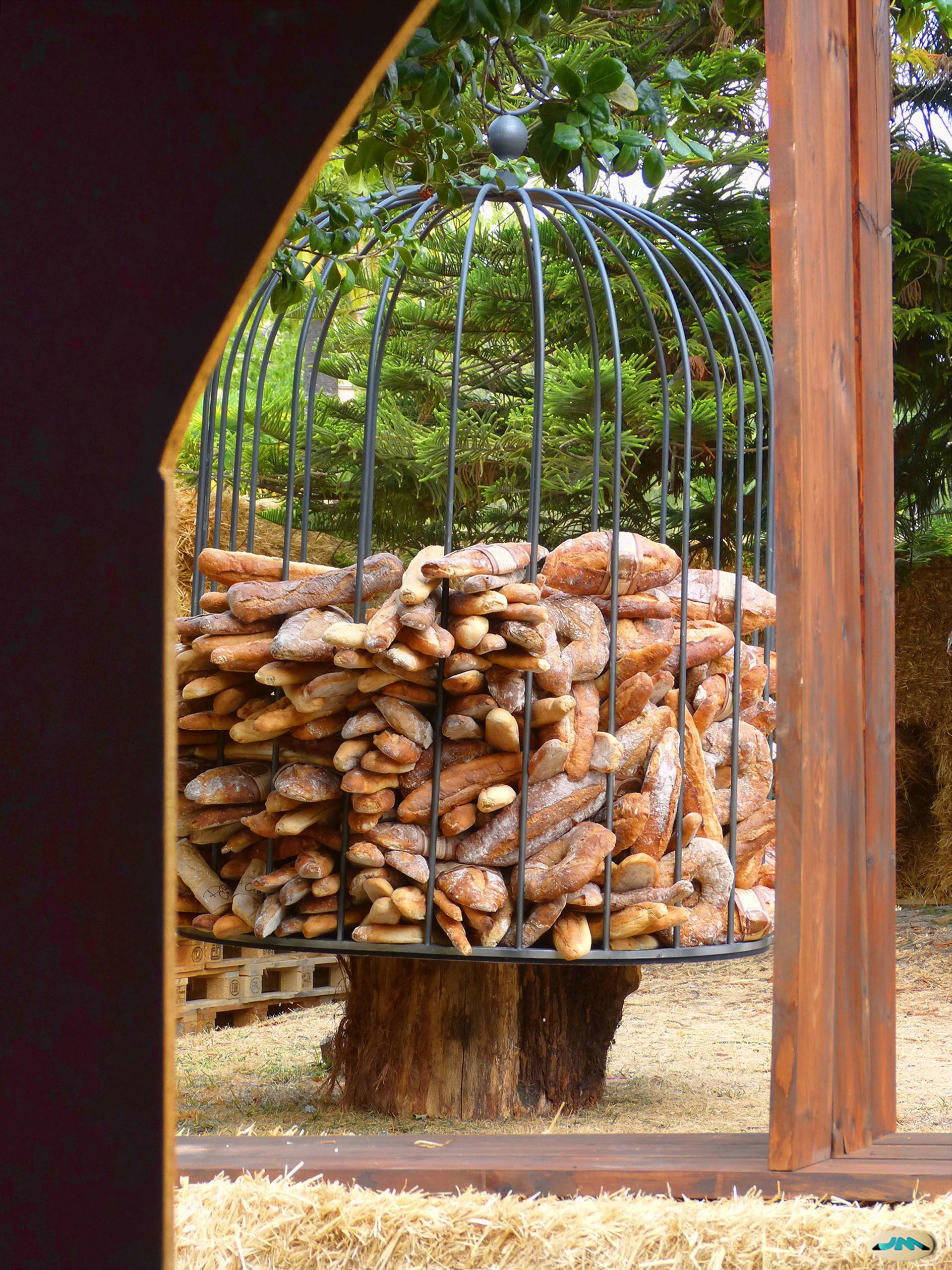
Bread in a cage

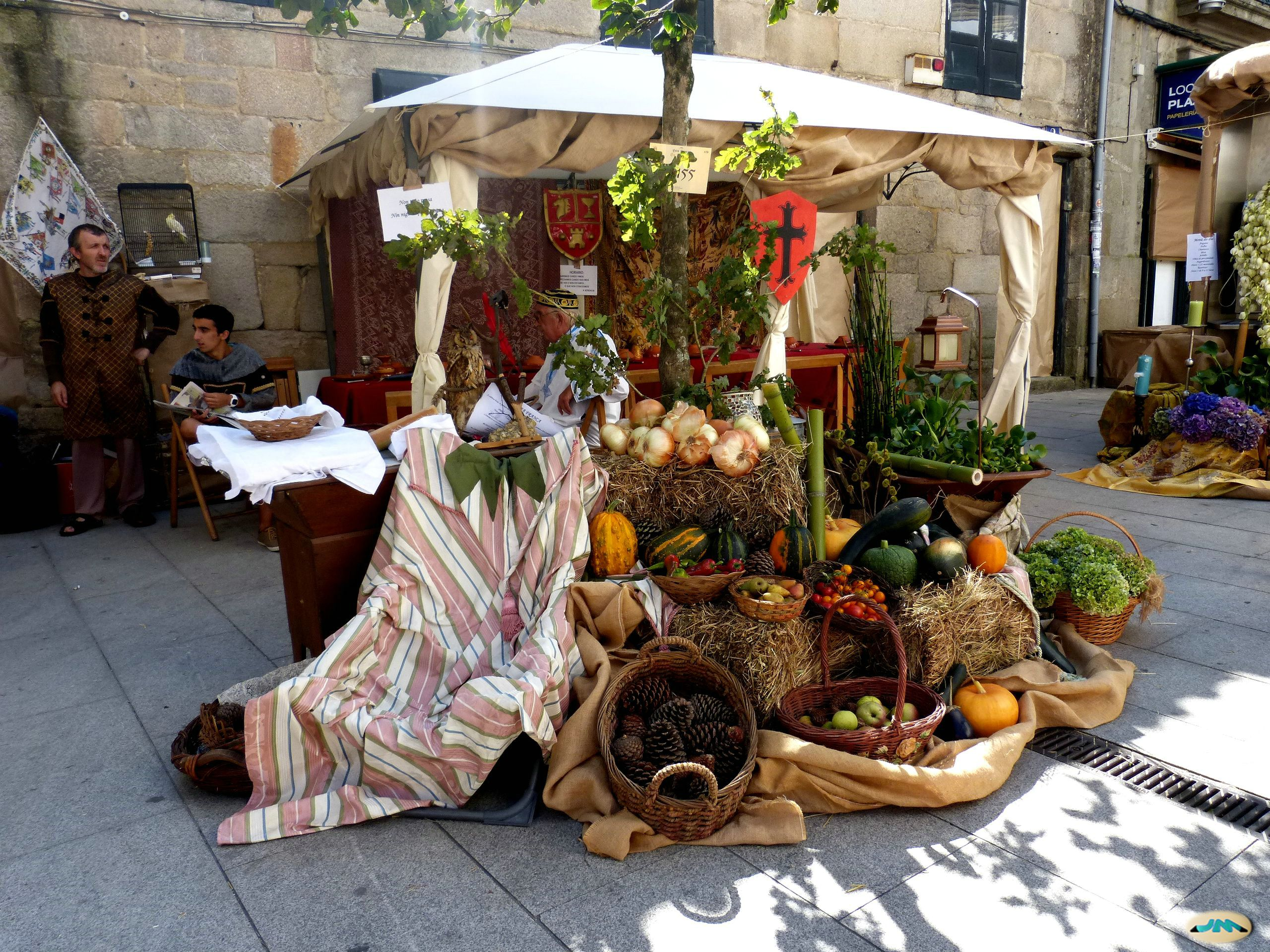
Vegetables

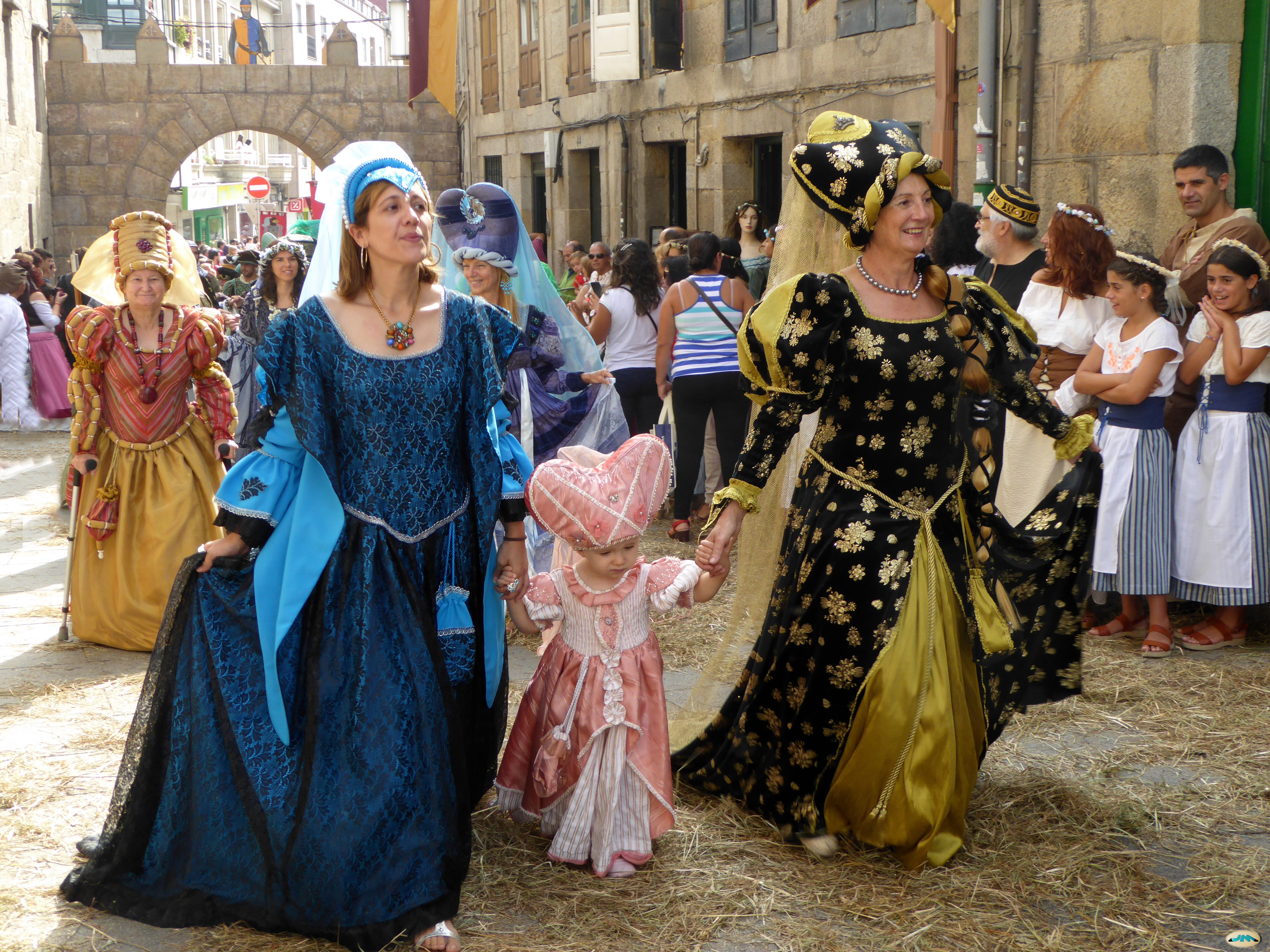
Nobles

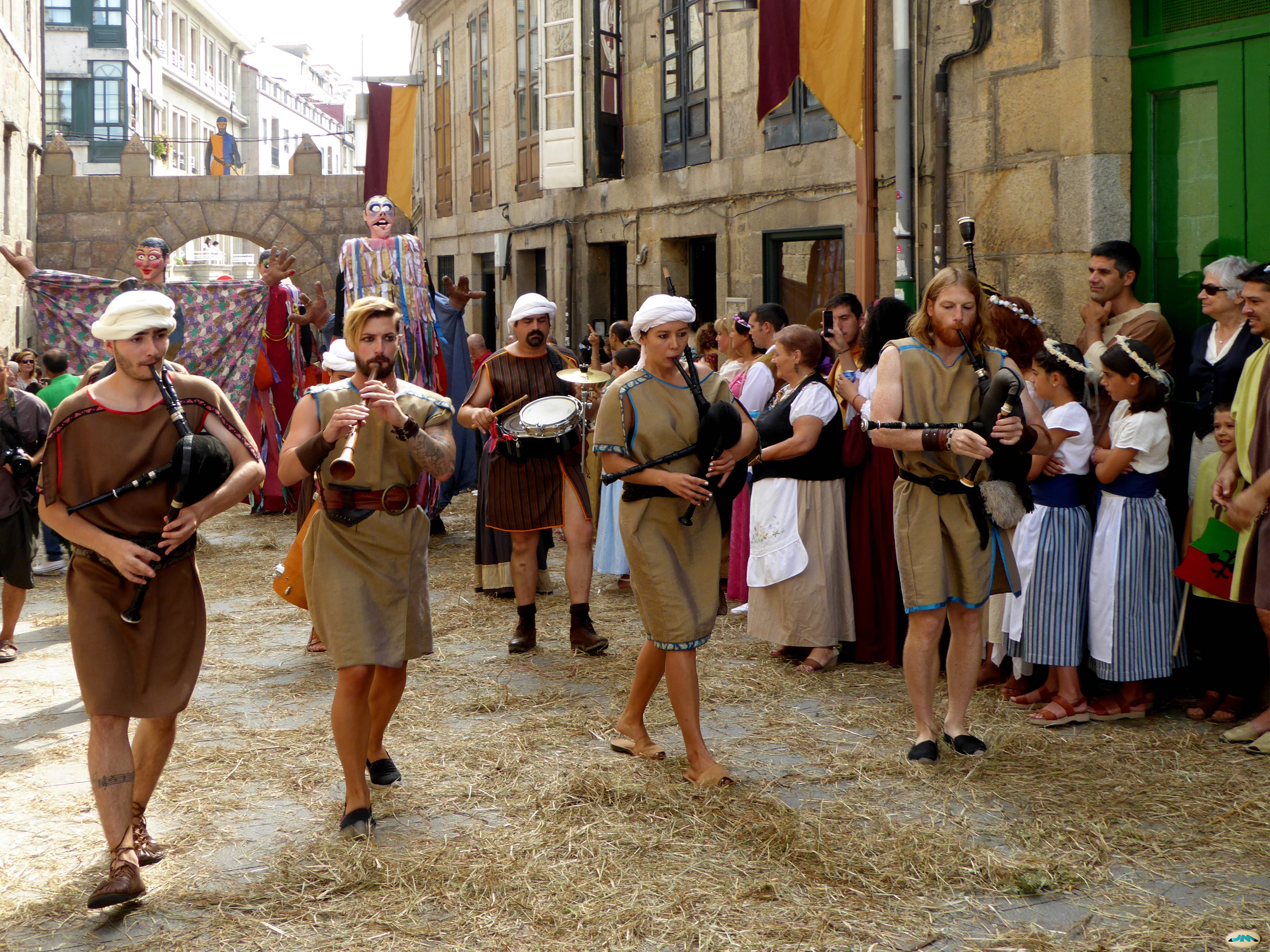
Troubadours

== See also ==
=== Related articles ===
- King Henry IV of Castile
- Old Town of Pontevedra

=== External links ===
- www.feirafranca.pontevedra.gal+
