= Pazo de Mugartegui =

Baroque Mansion in Pontevedra, Spain

Mugartegui Palace
- Pazo de Mugartegui
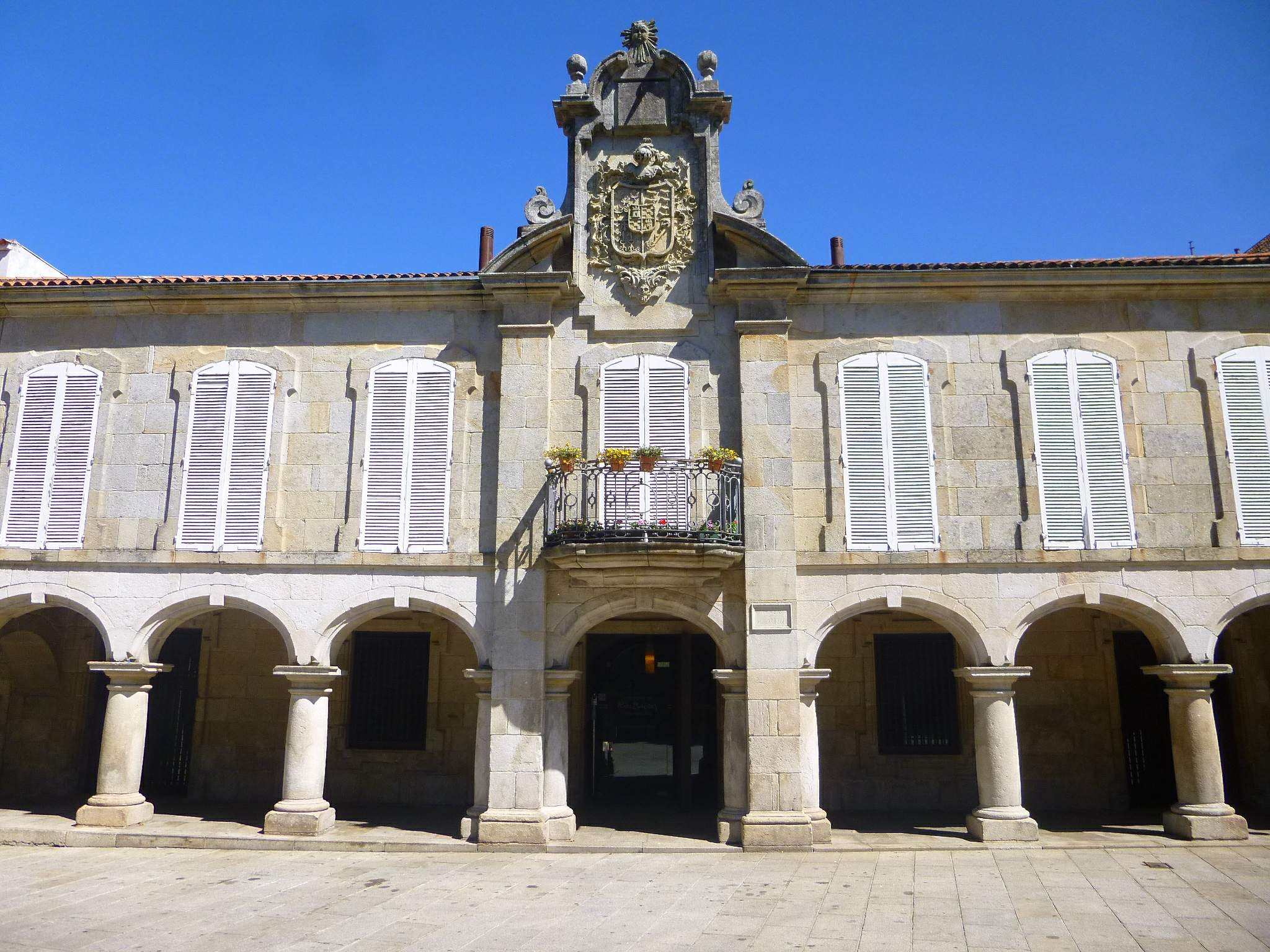
- Interactive map of the Mugartegui Palace area

General information
- Type: Pazo
- Location: Pontevedra, Galicia, Spain
- Coordinates: 42°26′00.9″N 8°38′35.8″W
- Current tenants: Regulatory Council of the Rías Baixas Designation of Origin
- Completed: 1771
- Owner: City Council of Pontevedra

Technical details
- Floor count: 2

Design and construction
- Architect: Pedro Antonio Ferreiro

The Palace of Mugartegui, or Palace of the Counts of Fefiñáns in Pontevedra, Spain, is a Baroque pazo dating from the 18th century. It currently houses the headquarters of the Regulatory Council of the Rías Baixas Designation of Origin.

== Location ==
It is located in the Plaza de la Pedreira, in the heart of the old town, very close to the medieval Burgo Bridge. The large quantity of stones accumulated in front of the pazo de Mugartegui to build the pazo as well as the church of Saint Bartholomew and the College of the Society of Jesus led to this space being called the Plaza de la Pedreira (Stone Quarry).

== History ==
The pazo was built for José Manuel Valladares y Figueroa, Count of Fefiñáns, on the ruins of a 17th-century house. It was built by the master stonemason Pedro Antonio Ferreiro, who completed the construction in 1771 (with the exception of the gable of the coat of arms), finished in 1773. The building then belonged to the Fernández de Mugártegui family, related to the Valladares, from whom it takes its current name.

During the 19th century, the manor house became an educational centre, as it housed the Male Teachers' Training College. In the 20th century, it was divided into several dwellings and, from 1955 onwards, it was the headquarters of the Jovellanos Academy of Studies.

Since 1998 it belongs to the City Council of Pontevedra, which bought it on 20 November 1998 The architect Jesús Aser Fole was commissioned to renovate it. The headquarters of the Control Council of the Rías Baixas Wine Denomination of Origin has been located there since 2003, with a wine museum on the ground floor, while its rooms are used by the City Council for protocolary, cultural and social events. It was opened for these new functions on 24 March 2001.

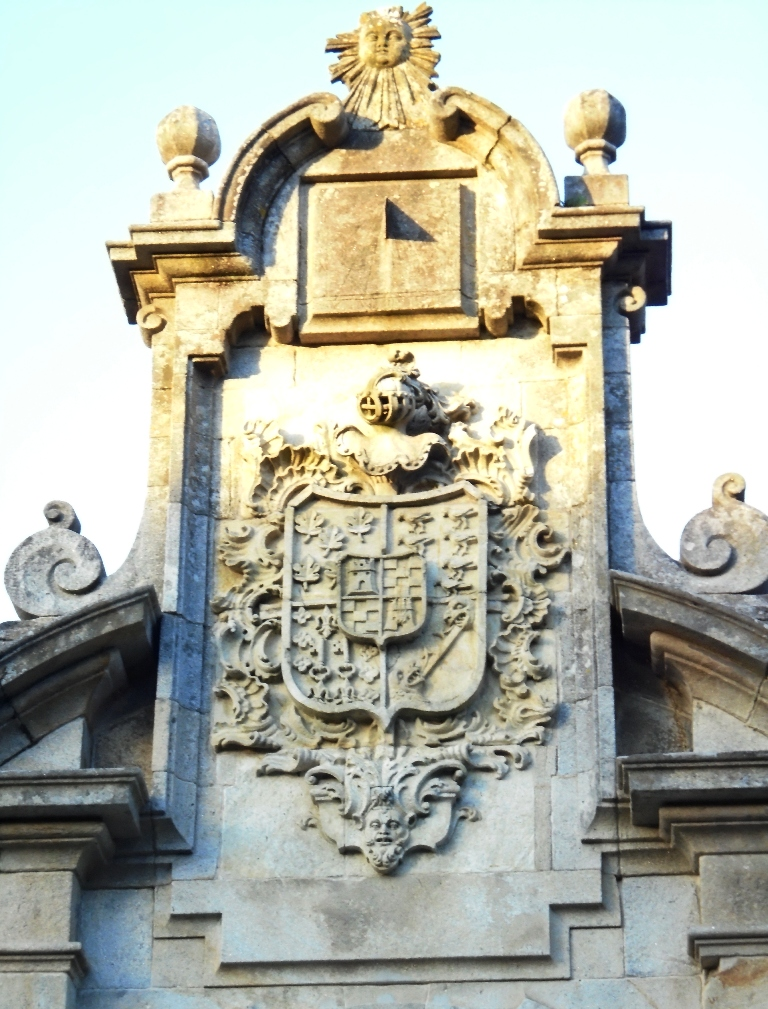
Coat of arms of the Mugartegui Palace crowned by a stone sundial

== Description ==
The building has a façade with an entrance arch, a central balcony with a curved railing and a gable. The ground floor has arcades that gave access to the former stables and cellars and to the servants' rooms, with seven semicircular arches supported by small columns of Tuscan order. Above these arches, the second floor has seven French windows. In front of the central French window there is a small balcony with an iron railing.

The central body is framed by pilasters crowned with pinnacles. In the upper part, there is a frontispiece on the semicircular split pediment with a rococo coat of arms crowned with a great helm, and above it, a sundial and a stone sun whose rays emanate from a face with smiling cheeks. The coat of arms shows the arms of the Figueroa, Arango, Quirós and Omaña lineages.

On the rear façade, you can see the terrace that once opened up as a viewpoint over the Lérez river.

== Culture ==
The main hall of the palace is used by the City Hall of Pontevedra for cultural activities and for the celebration of weddings. In addition, from its balcony, a famous person makes a speech every year to inaugurate the August festivities of the Pilgrim Virgin of Pontevedra.

== Gallery ==
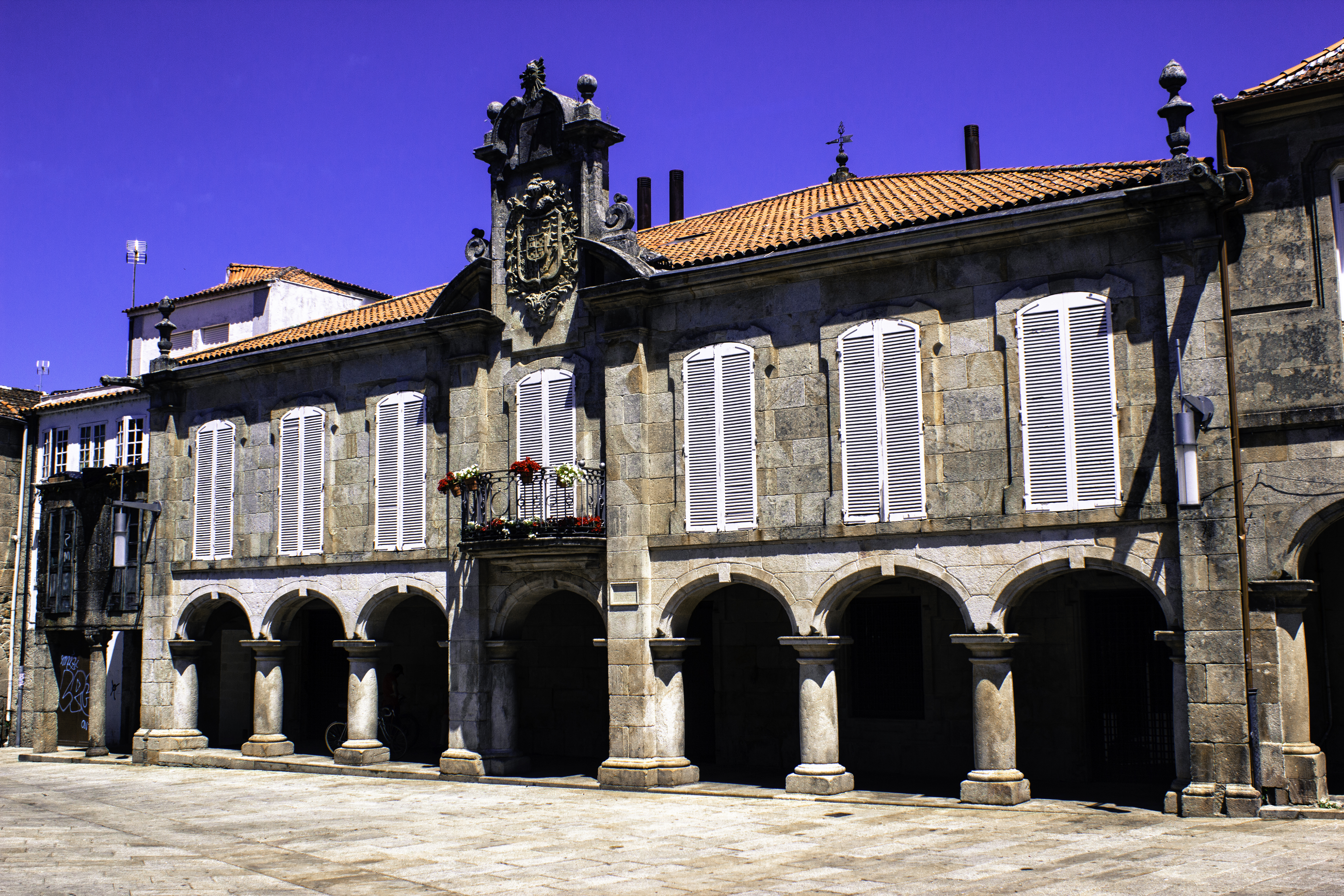
Façade

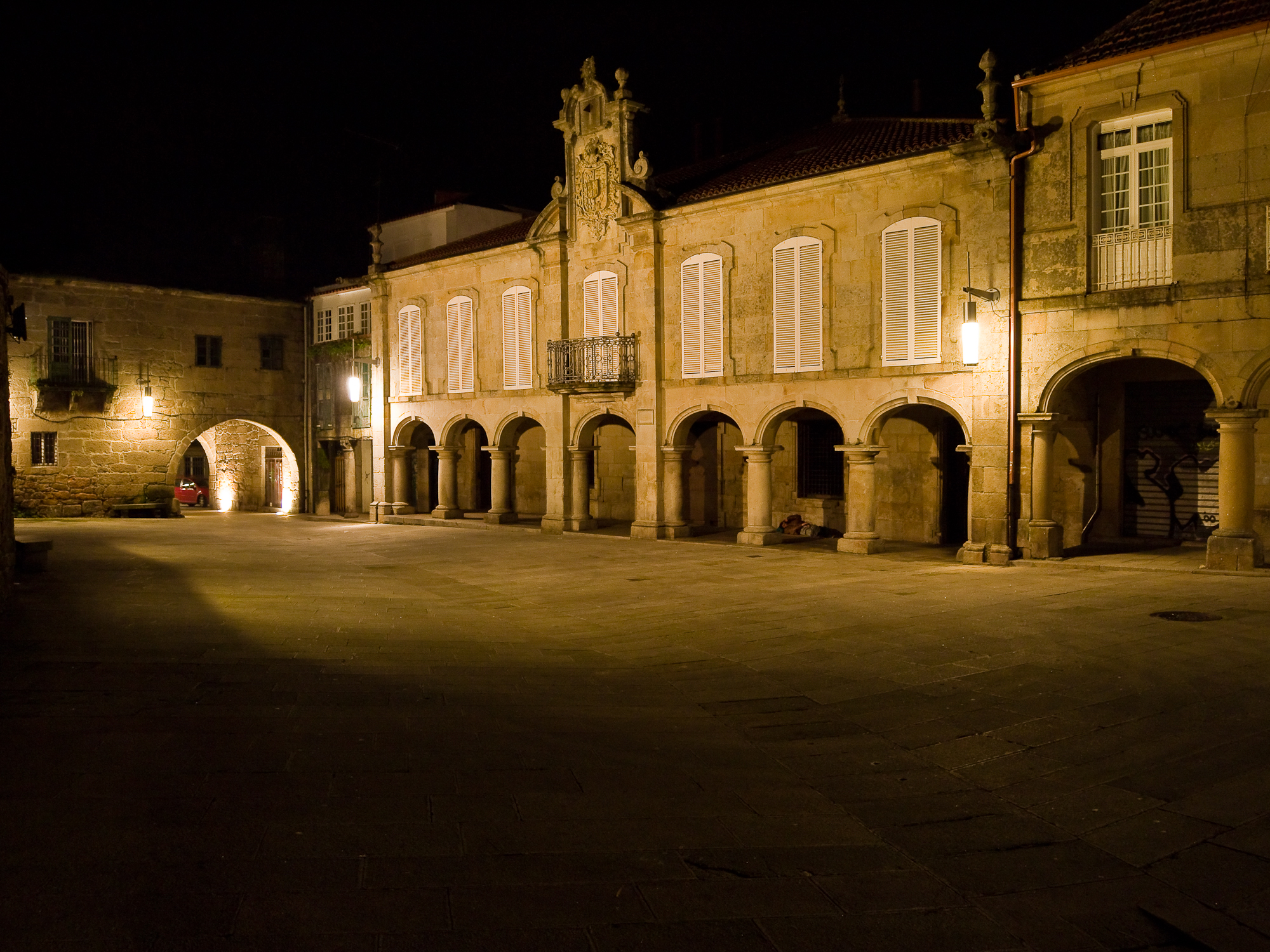
The palace in Mugartegui square at night

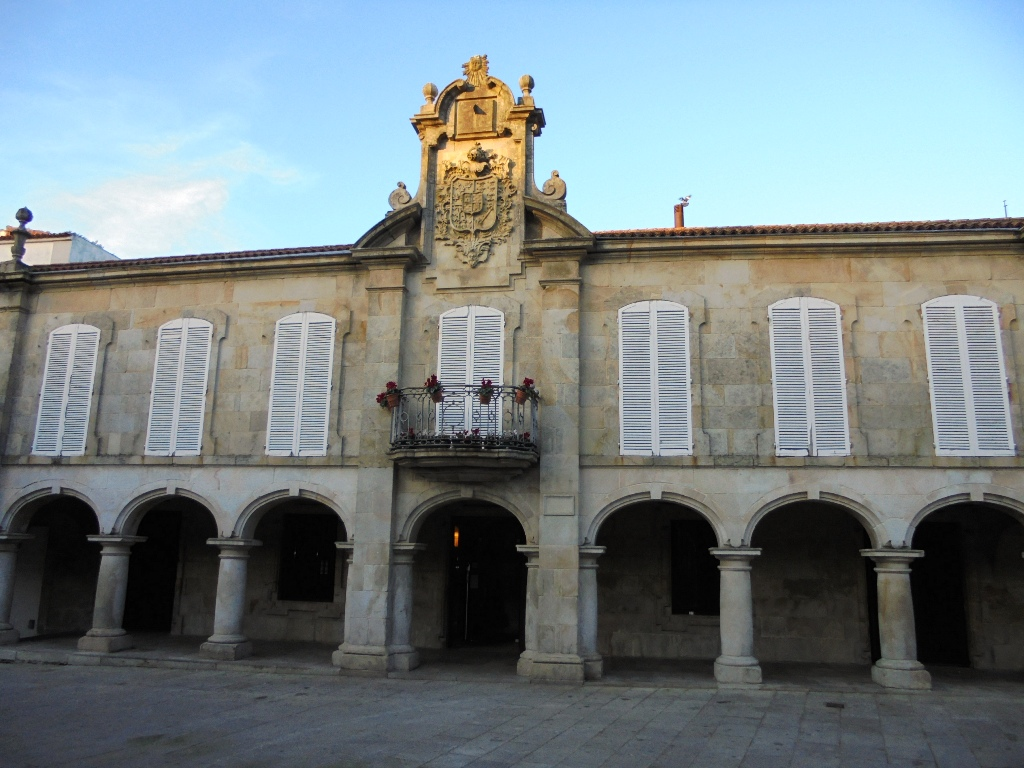
Front of the palace

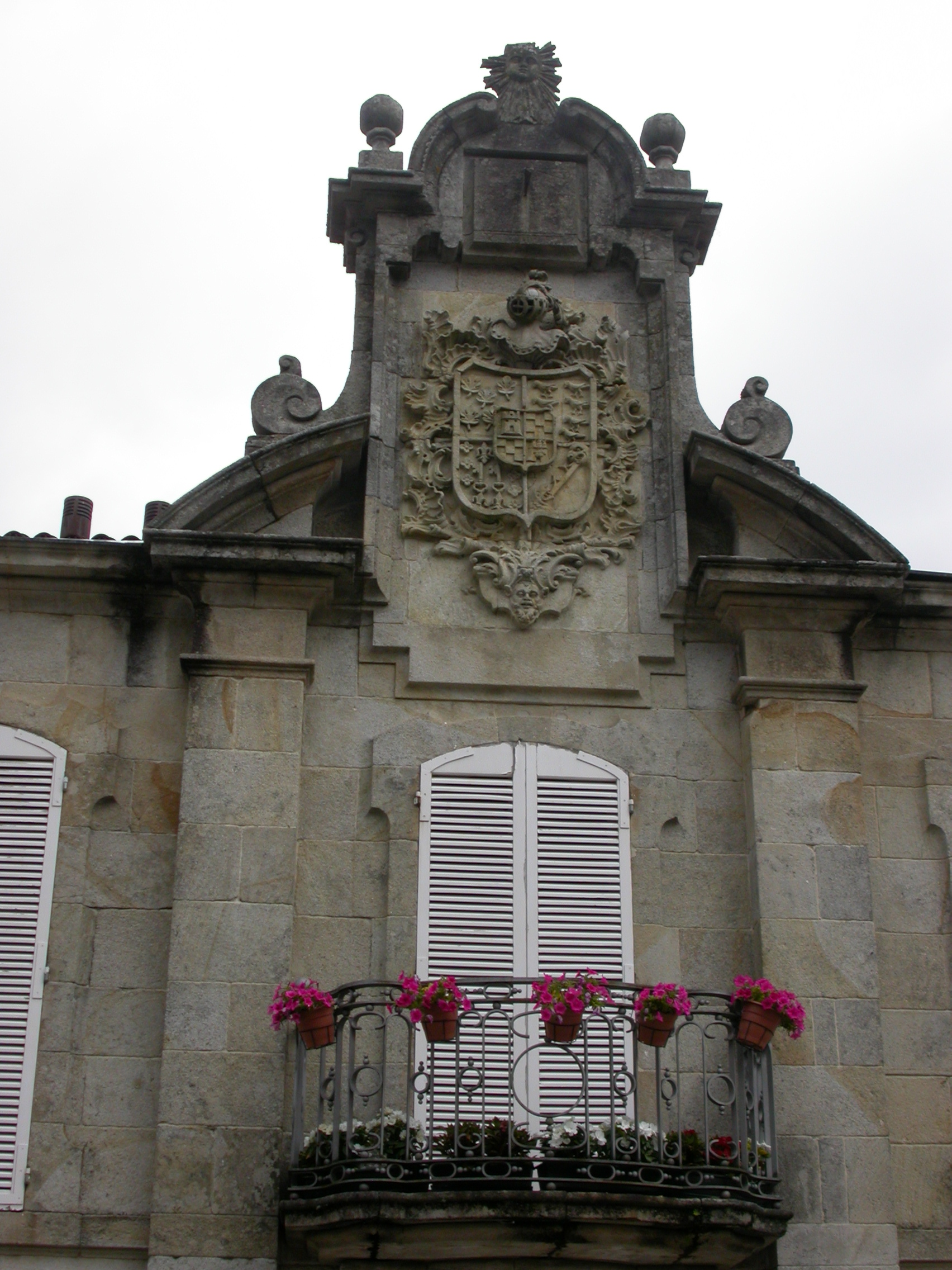
Balcony and coat of arms

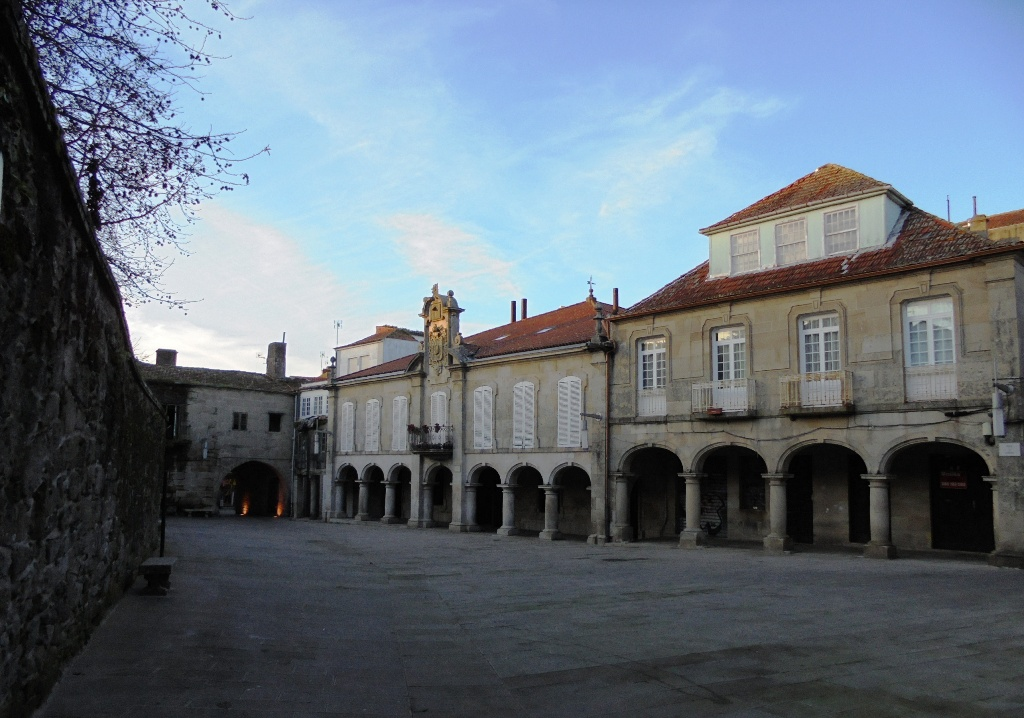
The palace on the square by day

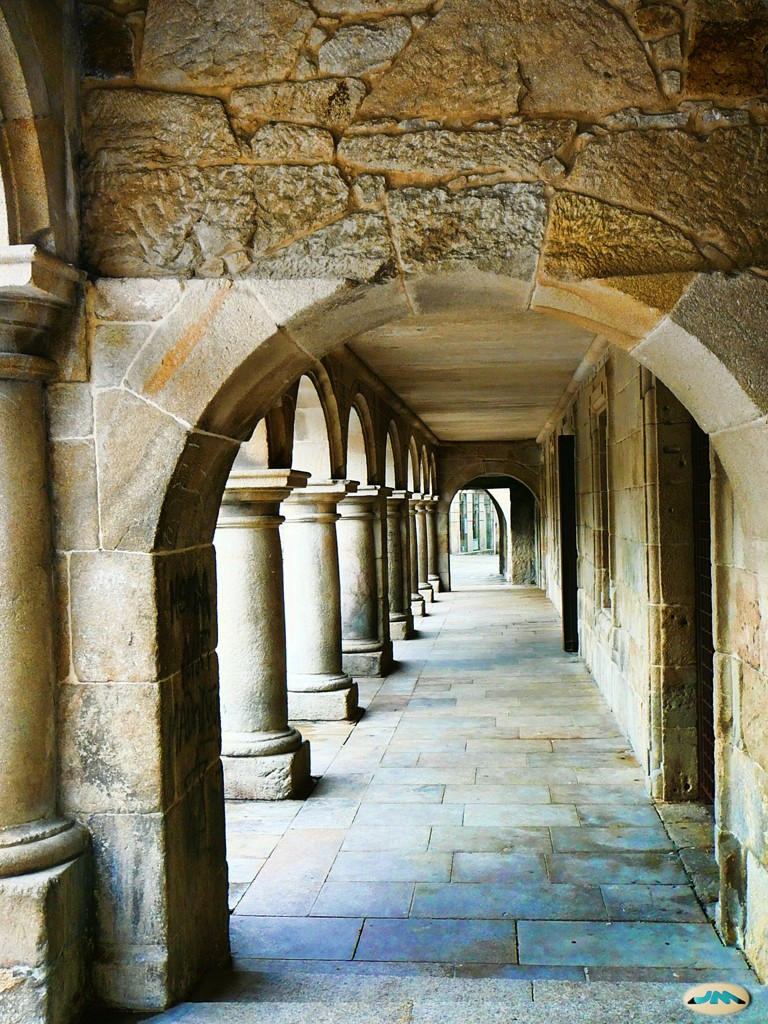
Palace arcades

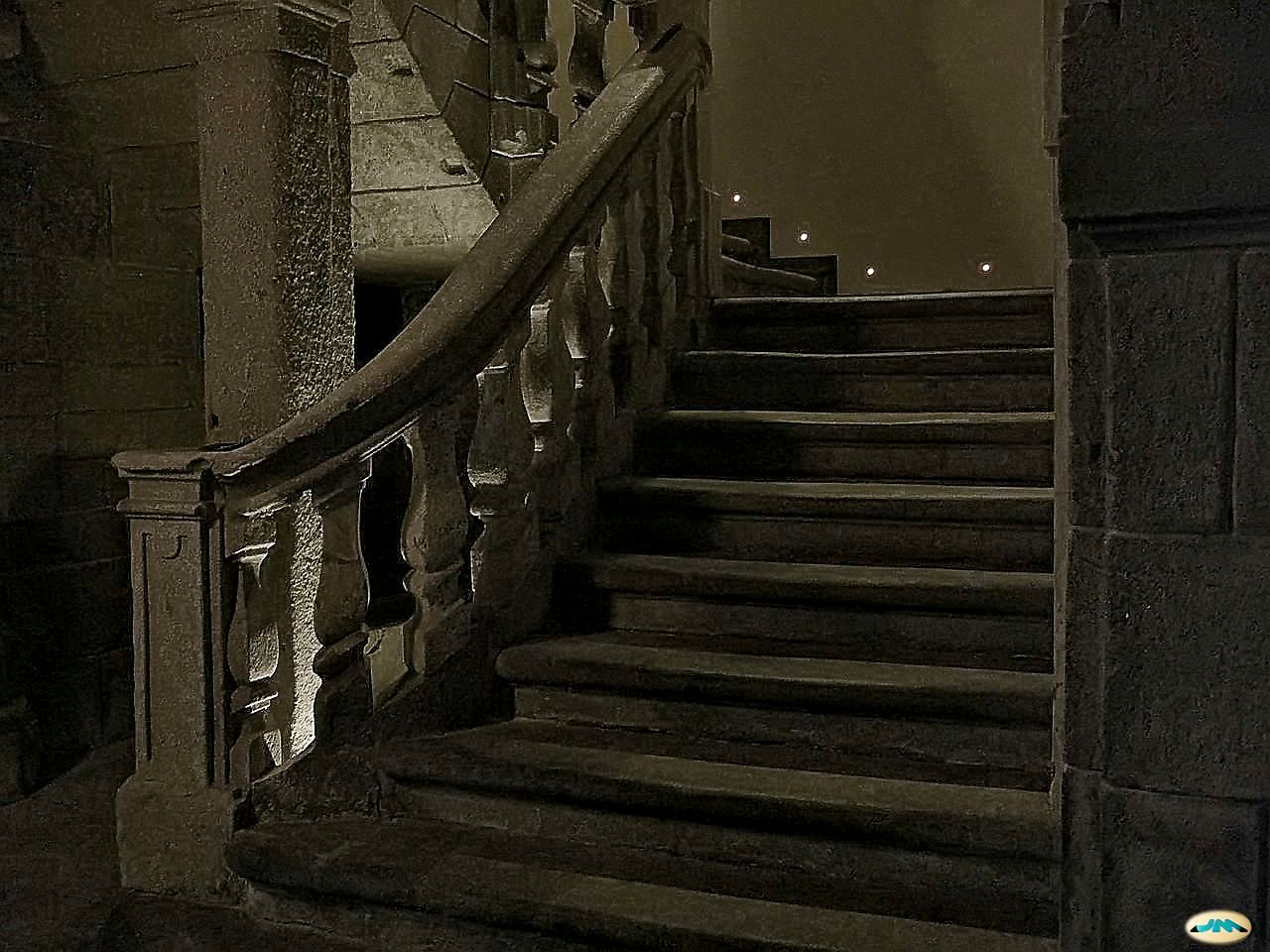
Internal staircase

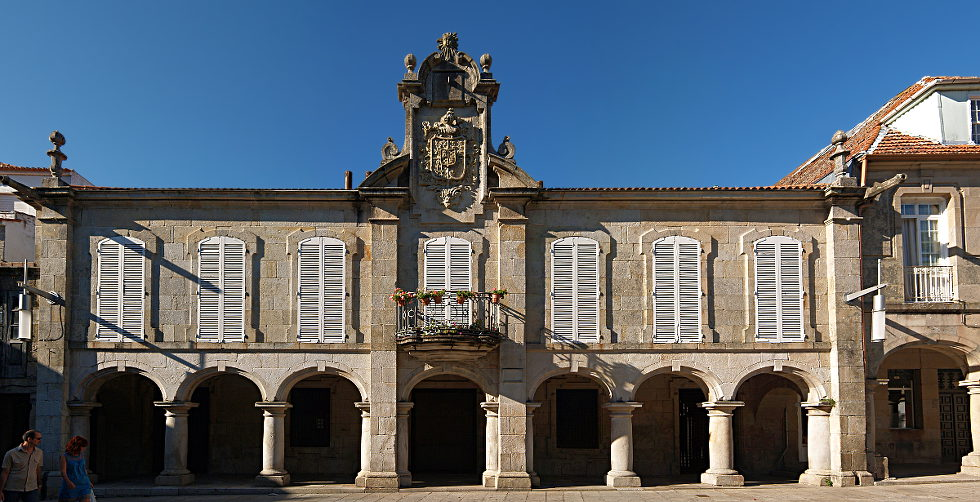
Façade

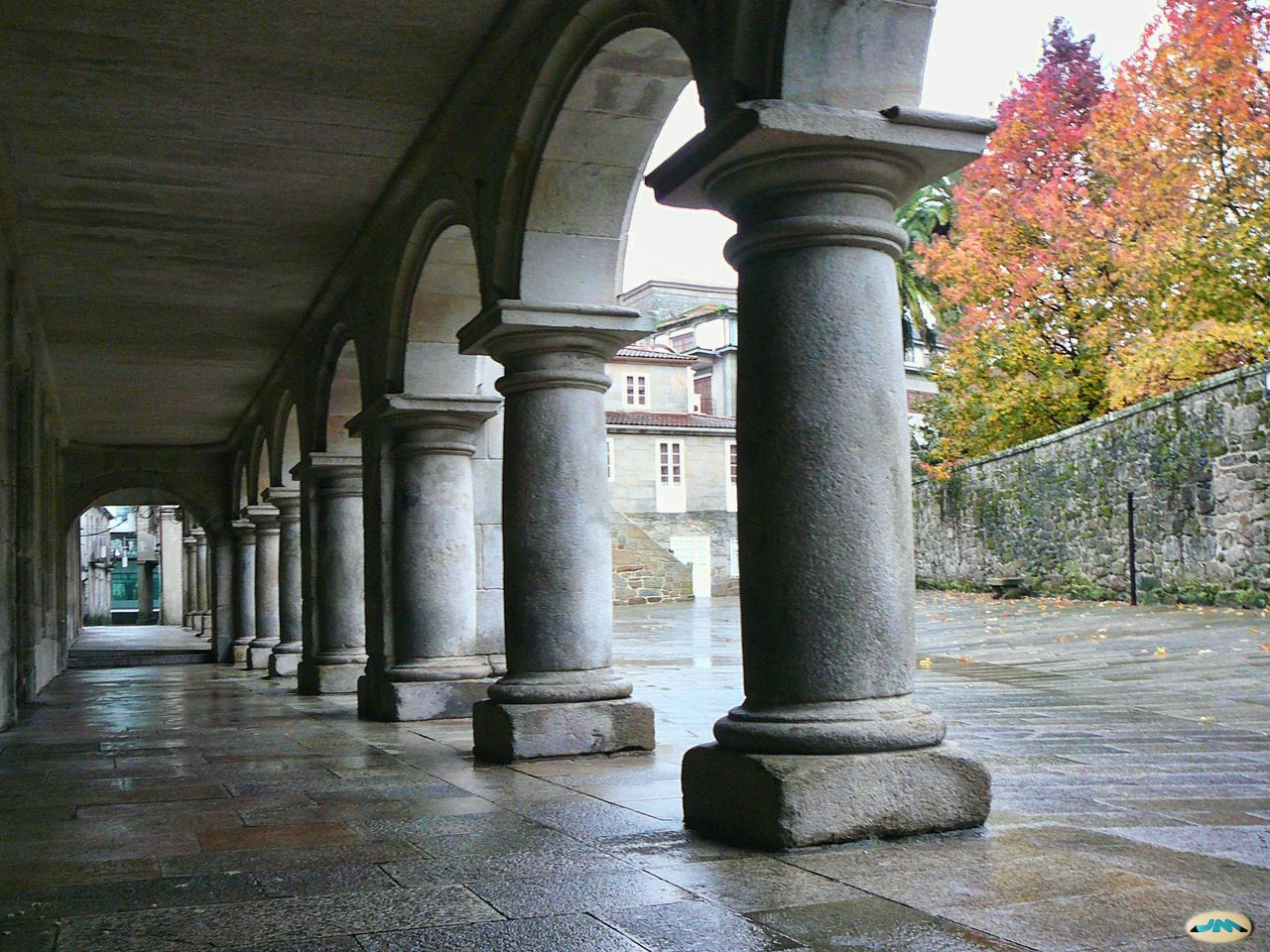
Arcades and Mugartegui Square

== Bibliography ==
- Aganzo, Carlos (2010). Pontevedra. Ciudades con encanto (in Spanish). Madrid: El País-Aguilar. pp. 63–64. ISBN 978-8403509344.
- Fontoira Surís, Rafael (2009). Pontevedra monumental (in Spanish). Pontevedra: Diputación Provincial de Pontevedra. p. 303. ISBN 978-84-8457-327-2.
- Riveiro Tobío, Elvira (2008). Descubrir Pontevedra (in Spanish). Pontevedra: Edicións do Cumio. p. 39. ISBN 9788482890852.

== See also ==
=== Related articles ===
- Hôtel de ville de Pontevedra

=== External links ===
- Mugartegui Palace on the website Visit-Pontevedra
- Pazo de Mugartegui on the website Terras de Pontevedra
- Pazo de Mugartegui on the website Rias Baixas Tourism
