= Old Town of Pontevedra =

Neighbourhood in Pontevedra, Spain

Pontevedra historic centre Centro histórico de Pontevedra
- Neighbourhood of Pontevedra
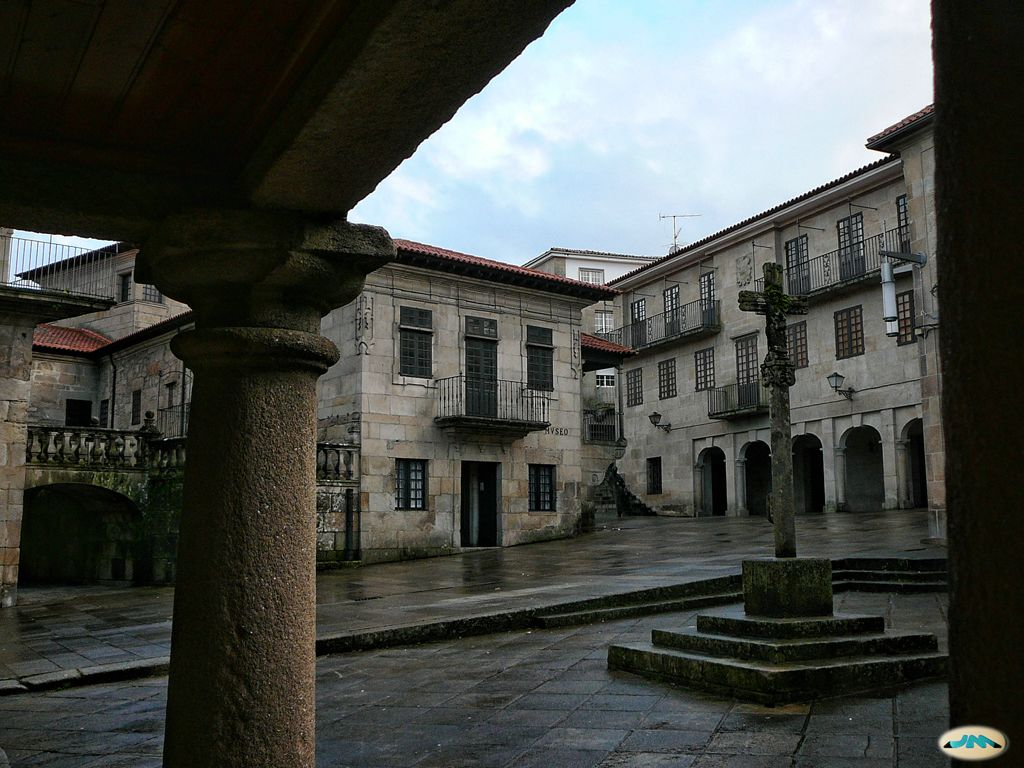
- Pontevedra Museum in the old town
- Coordinates: 42°25′59.5″N 8°38′42.5″W
- Country: Spain
- City: Pontevedra

Population
  - Total: 2,100
- Postal code: 36002

The historic centre of Pontevedra (Spain) is the oldest part of the city. It is the second most important old town in Galicia after Santiago de Compostela, and was declared a historic-artistic complex on 23 February 1951.

The historic centre has a wealth of architecture and preserves many remains from the medieval, modern and contemporary periods.

== Location ==
The historic centre of Pontevedra is bounded mainly by the streets that coincide with the line of the old city wall, its northern part being located on the left bank of the river Lérez that crosses the city. The old town is bounded by Sierra Street to the north, Arzobispo Malvar Street to the east, Michelena Street to the south and Cobián Roffignac and Padre Amoedo streets to the east. The Alameda and the Gran Vía de Montero Ríos with the Ruins of the San Domingo Convent and the official institutional buildings from the end of the 19th century can be considered as an extension of the historic centre to the west.

== History ==
It was probably in the 9th century that the population of Pontevedra began to gather around the old Roman bridge and enclave. In 1169, King Ferdinand II of León granted it the status of a town. The construction of the new medieval bridge (today the Burgo Bridge) began and the population gradually settled in what is now the historic centre.

Pontevedra was equipped with a fortified wall that developed in three successive stages from the original core located in the vicinity of the Basilica of Saint Mary Major, the highest and most easily defended area. The plan of the first wall is that of a pre-planned settlement, organised into three parallel streets (Platería Vella, Amargura-San Martiño and Alta-Sor Lucía streets) and a central transverse street corresponding to the upper part of Isabel II Street.

In the 13th century, the walled enclosure was enlarged due to the progressive economic and demographic development generated by the royal privileges granted to the city (in 1229, Alfonso IX granted it an exclusive privilege for the processing and distribution of fish throughout the kingdom, and in 1238, Ferdinand III granted it the manufacture of sardine fat). In the last years of the 13th century, the mendicant orders of the Dominicans, Poor Clares and Franciscans arrived, the latter building their convent on the other high point of the old town, to the east.

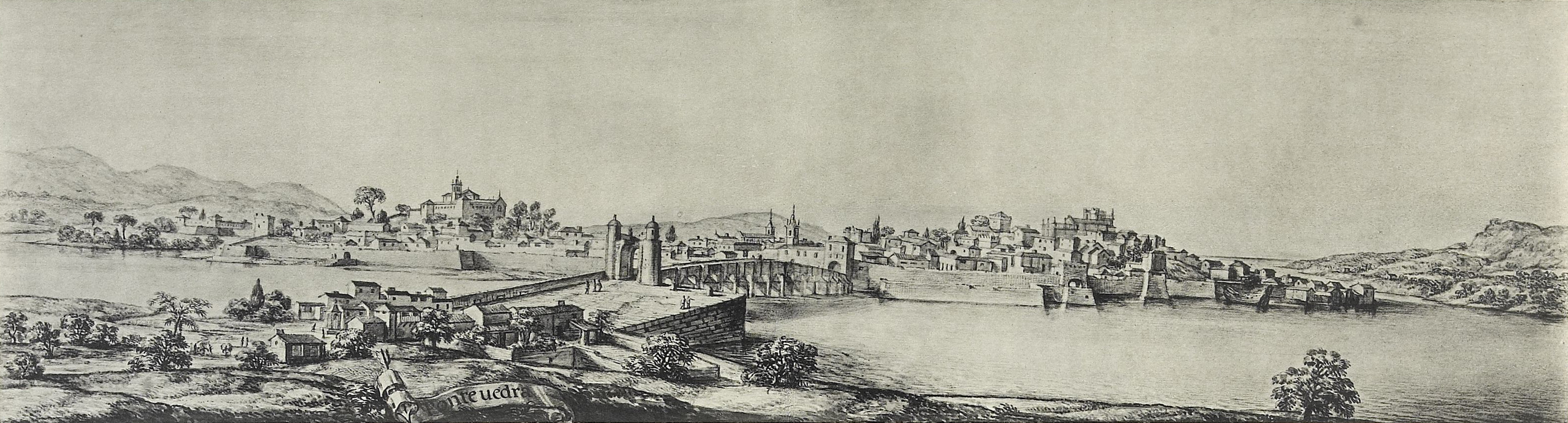
Historic centre of Pontevedra in 1669

In the 14th century, a second phase of expansion of the wall took place, running along Pasantería Street and the Plaza de la Herrería until its confluence with Michelena Street. In the 15th century, the growth of the city made a final extension of the wall necessary. In 1452, John II of Castile granted Pontevedra the title of loading and unloading port of Galicia and, in 1467, Henry IV rewarded it with the authorisation to establish an annual 30-day free fair. It was necessary to have a sufficiently large and controlled space to hold the fair (corresponding to the present-day Plaza de la Herrería). The new wall was completed in 1480.

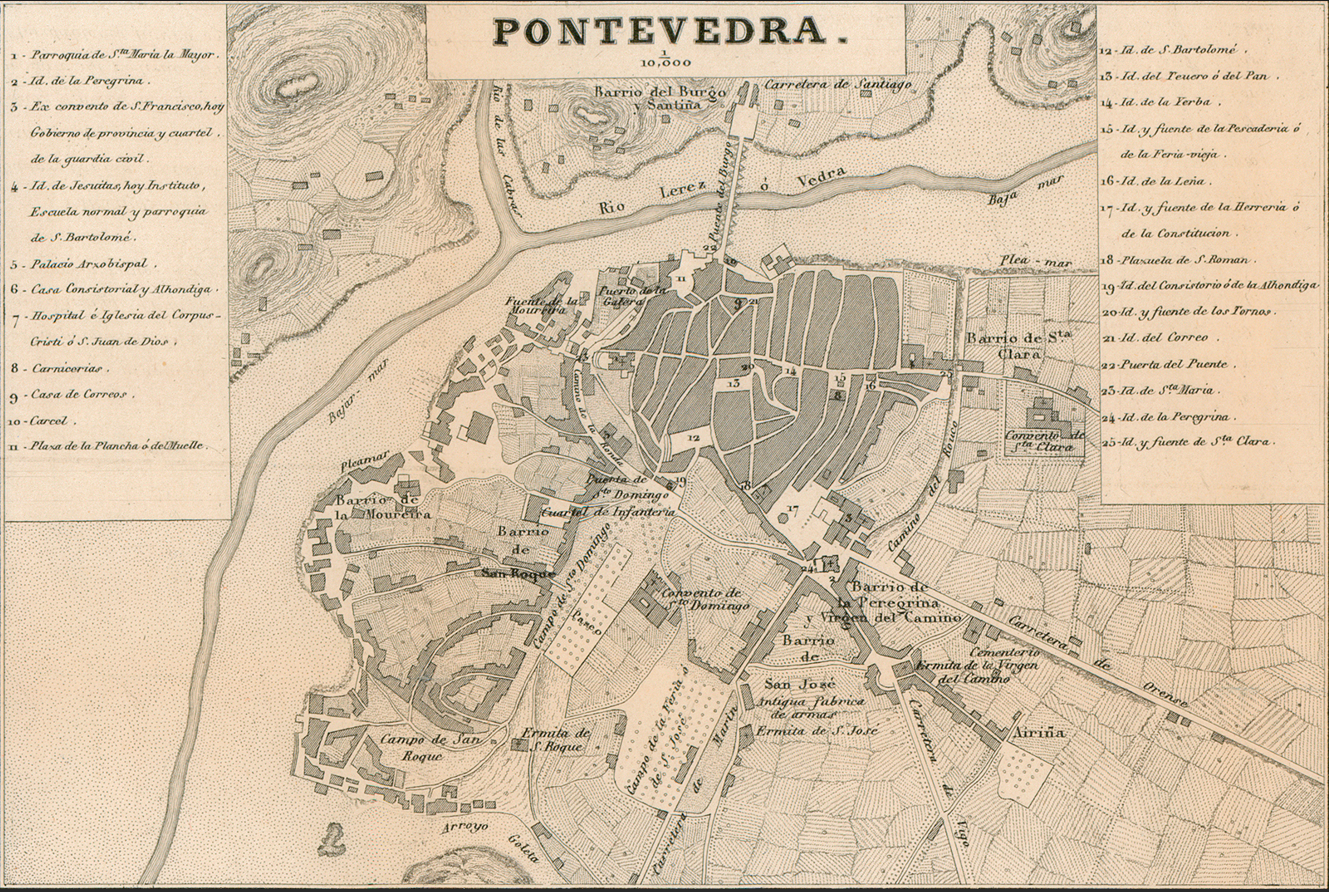
Map of Pontevedra and its historic centre in 1856

In the 16th century, the economic power of the Seamen's Guild led to the construction of the Basilica of Saint Mary Major. Throughout the 16th century, the network of streets, squares and buildings covered part of the empty spaces inside the walls of Pontevedra. In 1719, the English invasion caused great damage to the city. During this century, urban renovations were carried out with new squares and streets and new religious buildings were built, such as the Church of Saint Bartholomew and the College of the Society of Jesus, as well as new urban palaces such as that of Mugartegui and the remodelling of that of the Counts of Maceda. Near the walled enclosure, the Church of the Pilgrim Virgin was built in 1792.

In the 19th century, the medieval wall was demolished, beginning in 1852 with the Trabancas gate and ending with the section of Rouco Street and Cobián Roffignac Street in 1875. The archiepiscopal towers and the fortress of the Churruchaos were also demolished and the Mendoza mansion was built.

The new Town Hall was built in 1880, the Plaza de España was urbanised and the Alameda (the old Dominican orchard) was enlarged, in front of which were built the administrative buildings, seat of the institutions of the provincial capital, granted in 1833. In 1951, the historic centre of Pontevedra was declared a historic-artistic complex. In 1999, the historic centre became pedestrianised and a thorough urban renewal was carried out.

== Urban planning ==
The Basilica of Saint Mary Major and the Convent of San Francis mark the strategic points from west to east of the old town on two hills. Between them, the medieval city with its labyrinth of streets (ruas) and medieval squares was shaped. The streets were structured around a main axis that corresponds to the present-day Sarmiento and Isabel II streets, and from there the rest of the streets were divided, forming a classic example of a medieval city with a fishbone-like plan, where the streets are structured from a single central axis onto which the secondary streets are grafted. The Calle Real (Royal street) crosses part of the old town from north to south. Between the streets, the historic centre is dotted with squares of regular proportions, square or rectangular, with many noble houses with stone coats of arms, which air out the urban fabric and give it elegance.

The main green area in the historic centre is the Casto Sampedro gardens annexed to the church and former convent of Saint Francis, in the center of which is the Renaissance fountain of La Herrería. To the west is the Campillo de Santa María with the remains of the old wall and to the southwest of the old town is the Alameda de Pontevedra, the former orchard of the Dominicans.

== Landmarks ==
=== Squares of medieval origin ===
The medieval squares of the old town of Pontevedra stand out as small halls of regular and geometric proportions. Many of them evoke with their commercial names the activities that took place there centuries ago: the firewood square, the vegetable square, the stone quarry, the blacksmith's square... The most important squares are: the Verdura square, the Herrería square, the Leña square, the Teucer square, the Pedreira square and the Méndez Núñez square. Other important squares in the old town are: Cinco Calles, Quay Square, Curros Enríquez Square or Alonso de Fonseca and on the edge of the historic centre: Plaza de la Peregrina and Plaza de España.

=== Religious buildings ===
The most representative religious buildings in the old town were built by mendicant orders (Dominicans, Franciscans), by the powerful sailors' guild, by the Jesuits and by the brotherhood of Our Lady of Refuge and Divine Mother of Pilgrims. These buildings are: the ruins of the Gothic convent of St. Dominic, the Gothic church of St. Francis, the Gothic-Renaissance basilica of St. Mary Major, the Baroque church of St. Bartholomew, the College of the Society of Jesus and the Baroque church of the Pilgrim Virgin. In the old town there are also several chapels, such as the Chapel of the Nazarene and the Chapel of the Holy Souls and the sanctuary of the Apparitions, and outside, a few metres east of the old walls, is the Gothic convent of St. Clare.

=== Civil buildings ===
Pontevedra was a privileged place of residence for the nobility and powerful Galician families. No other Galician city has such a wealth of coats of arms on the facades of many noble houses and pazos. In the historic centre there are more than 200 coats of arms carved in stone.

Important civil buildings are: the House of the Bells, the Vaamonde House, the Old Mail House, the Palace of the Counts of Maceda, the Pazo of Gago and Montenegro, the Palace of Mugartegui, the Pazo García Flórez, the Pazo Castro Monteagudo, the House of Heads, the Main Theatre of Pontevedra and the Liceo Casino, the Pazo of the Marquis de Aranda, the Town Hall of Pontevedra, the Mendoza Mansion, the Palace of the Deputation of Pontevedra, the Valle-Inclán High School, the Building of the Official Association of Building Engineers and Technical Architects of Pontevedra, the Central Market of Pontevedra and the Castelao Building.

=== Statues ===
The statues in the historic centre pay tribute to important figures in the city's history: The Fiel Contraste, the Monument to the Heroes of Puente Sampayo or the statue of Valle-Inclán, as well as to popular figures such as the Ravachol parrot or the Galician women (Woman with chickens).

=== Bridges ===
The Burgo bridge is the arch bridge that provides access to the historic centre from the north and which gave its name to the town (Pontis Veteris).

=== Museums ===
The following museums are located in the historic centre of the city:

- Pontevedra Museum: It was inaugurated in 1929 and has 6 buildings. It is listed as one of the three best provincial museums in Spain.
- Archiepiscopal Towers Interpretation Centre (CITA): It was inaugurated in 2010 and shows what was one of the most important defensive structures of the city.

== Cultural events and festivals ==
The historic centre of the city is the place in the city where the Pontevedra Feira Franca, the burial of the Ravachol Parrot, Os Maios and various events of the patron saint festivities of the Pilgrim Virgin are held.

== Gallery ==
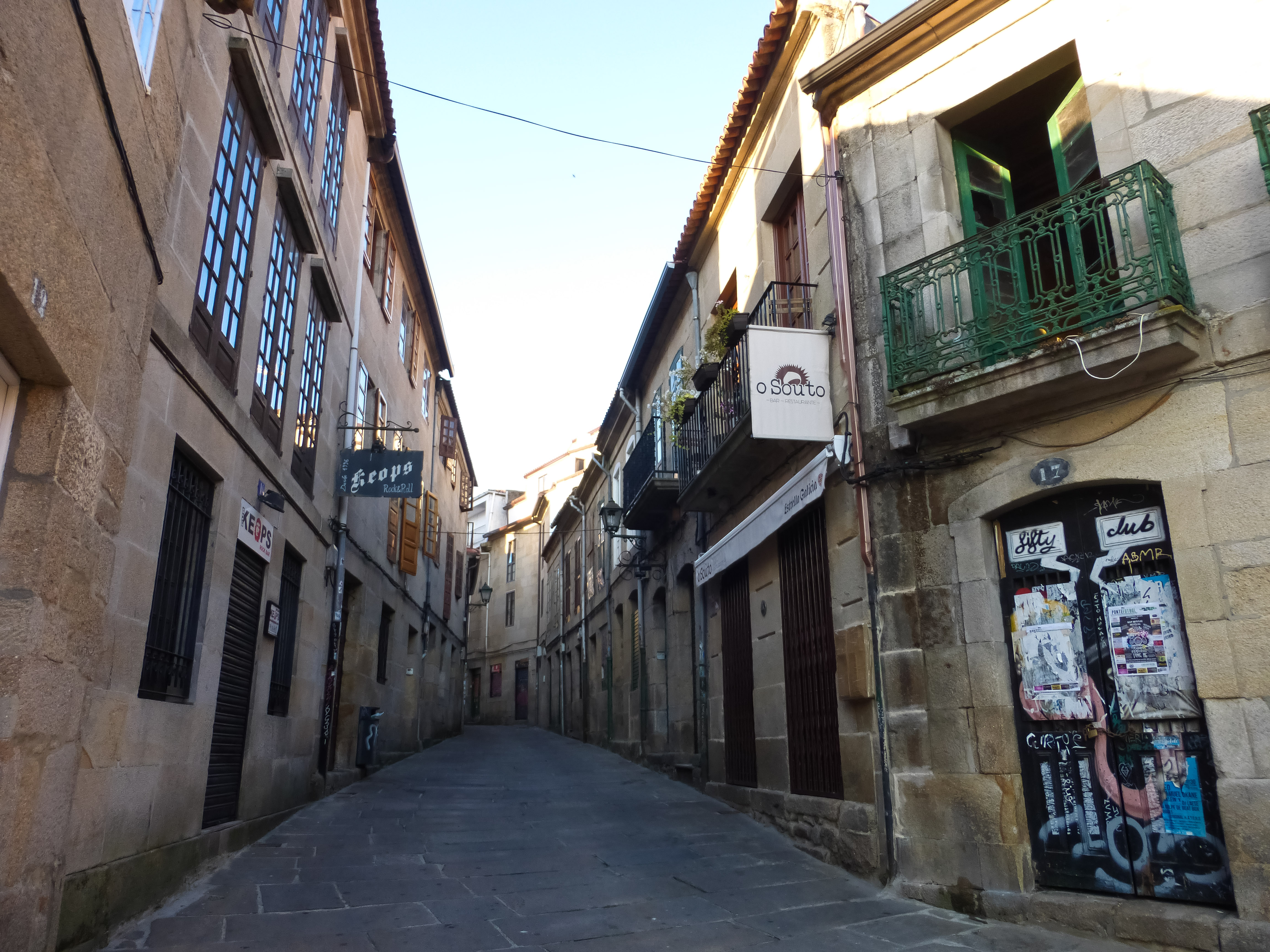

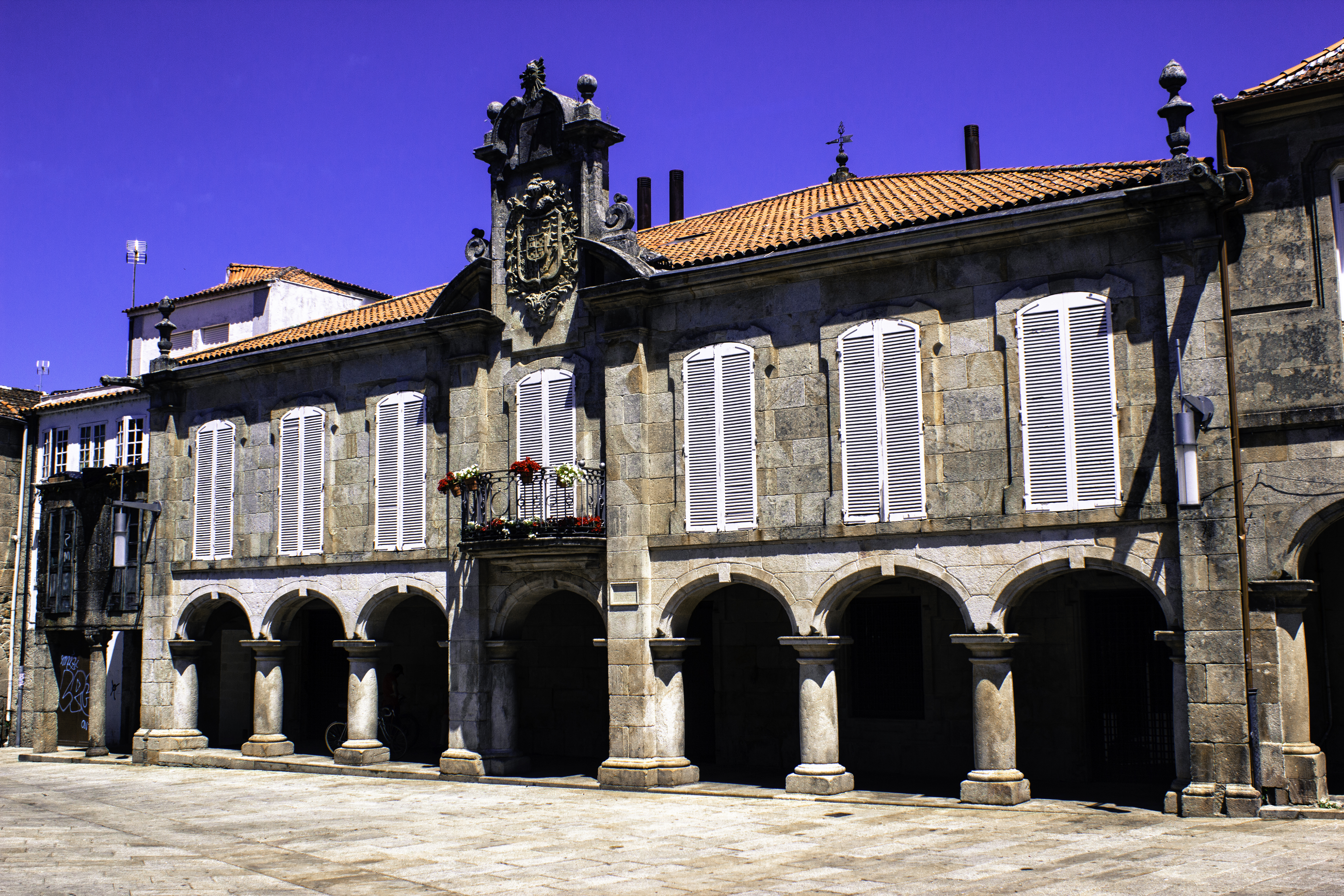

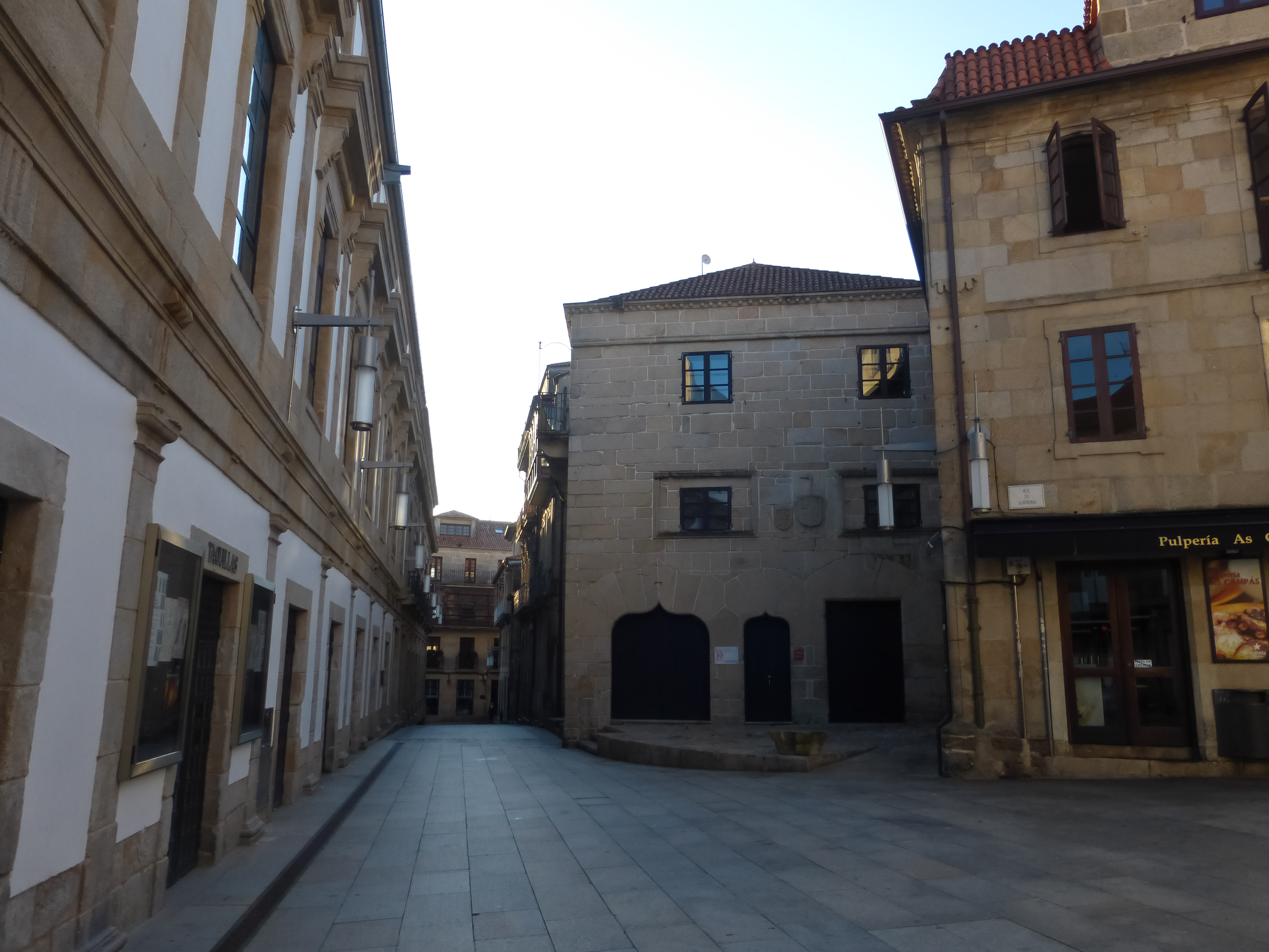

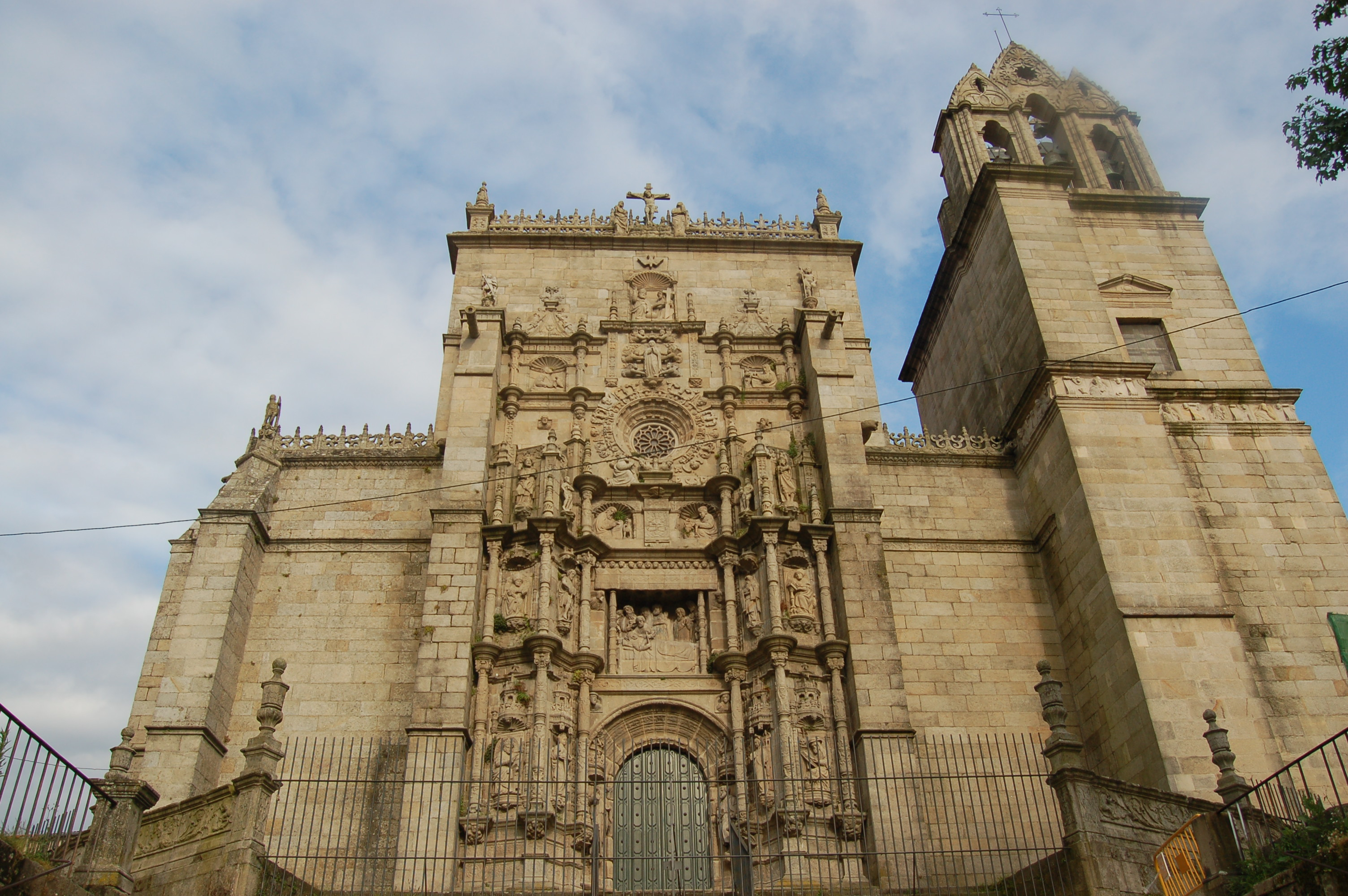

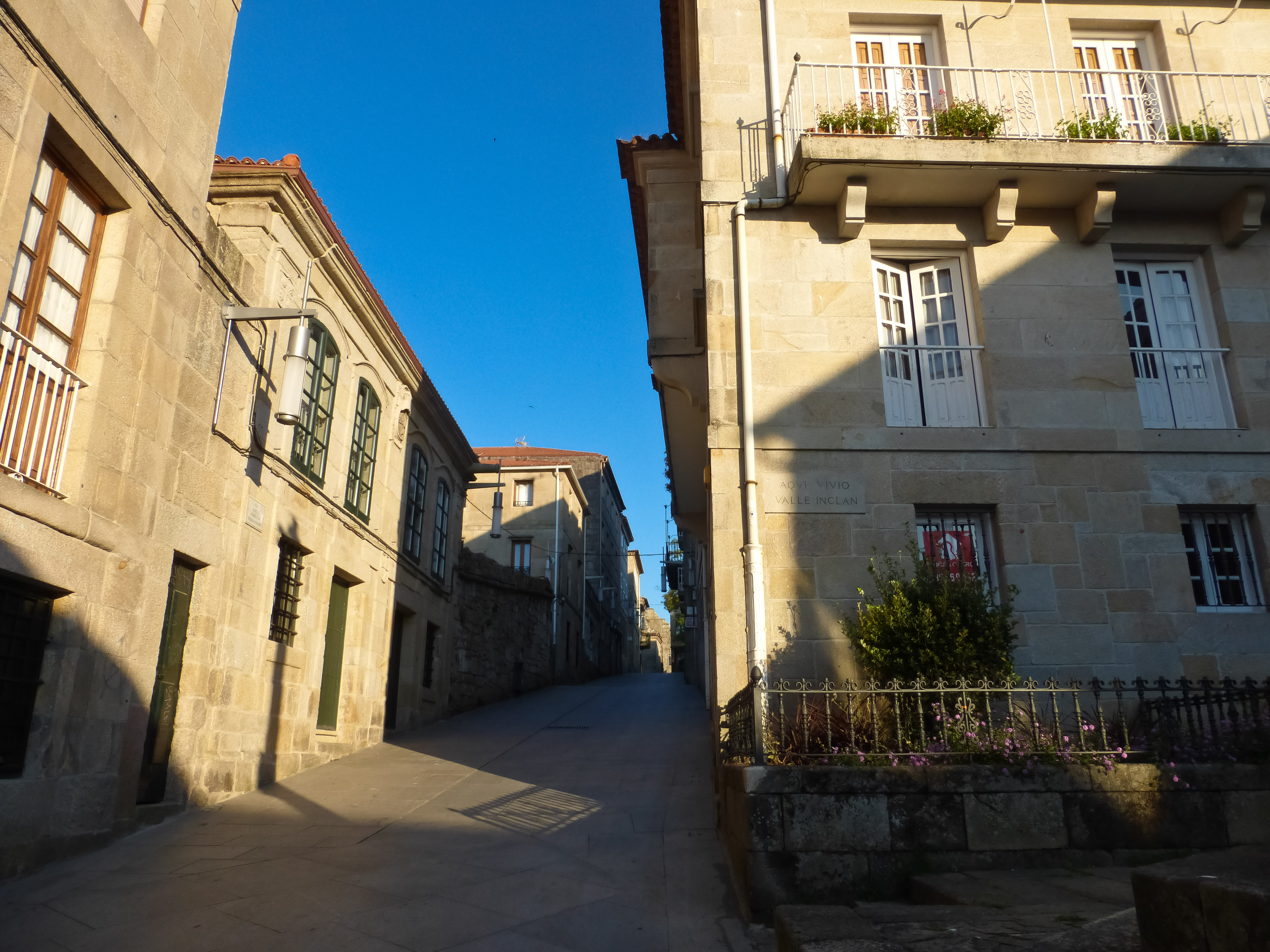

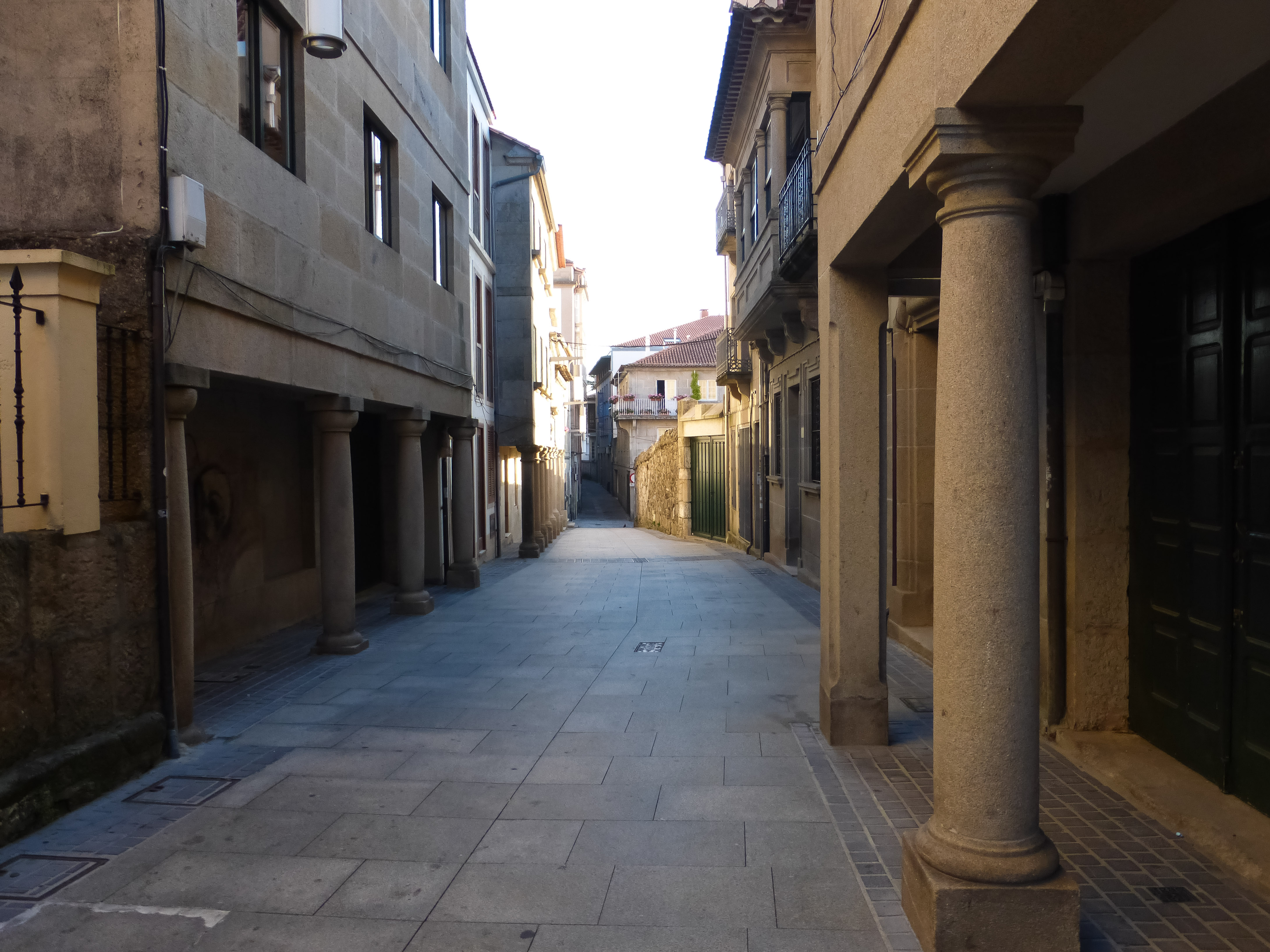

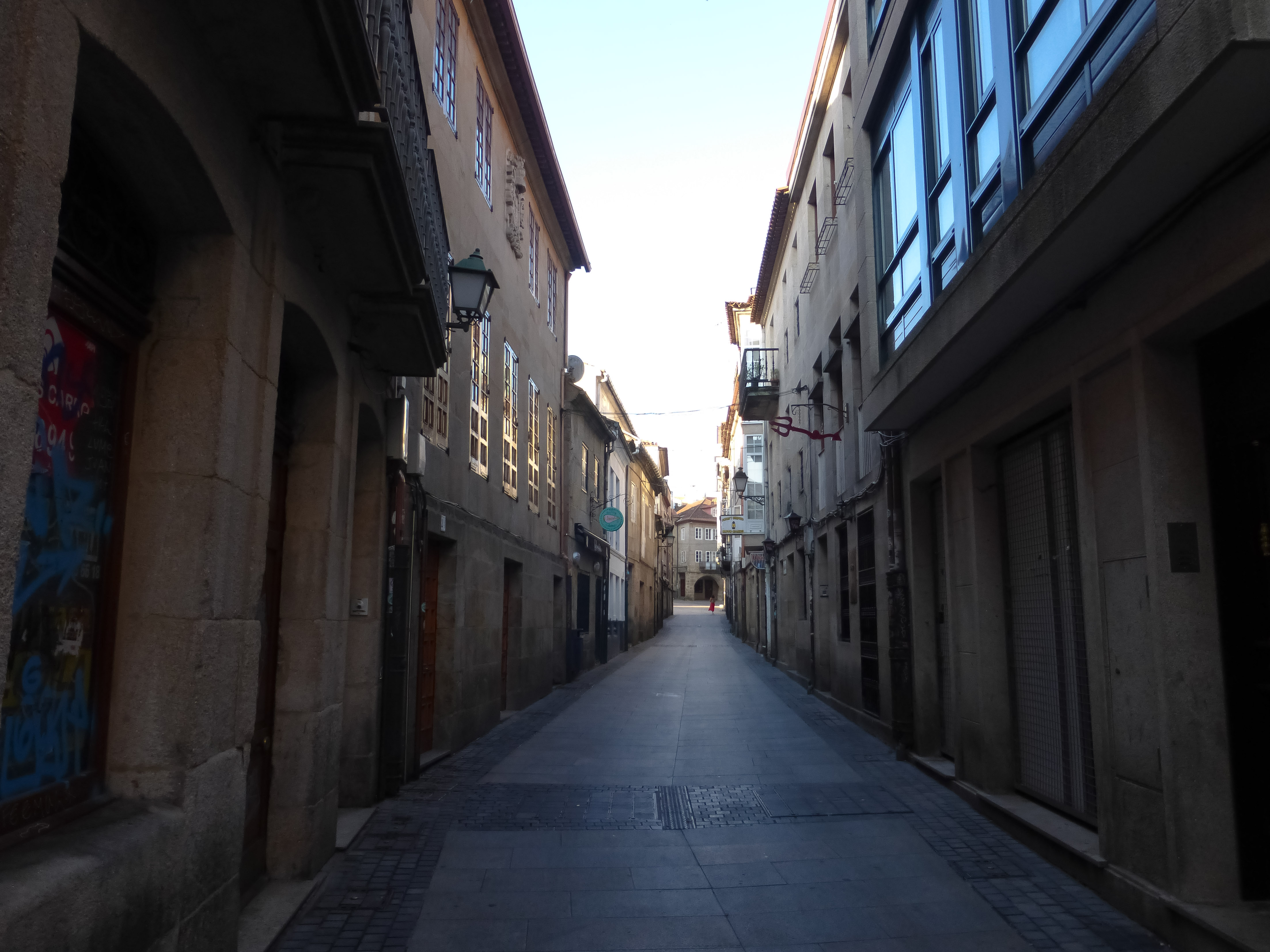

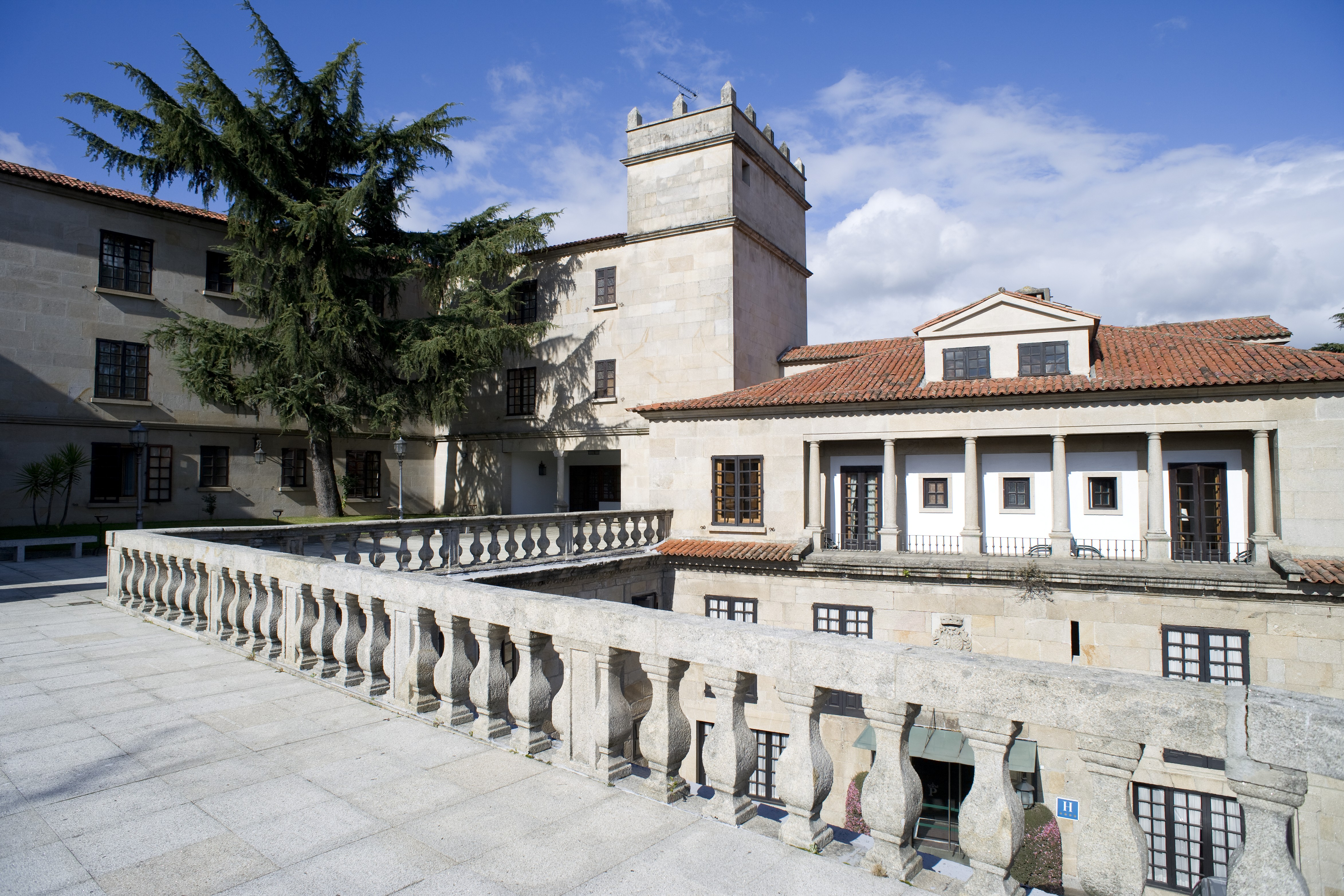

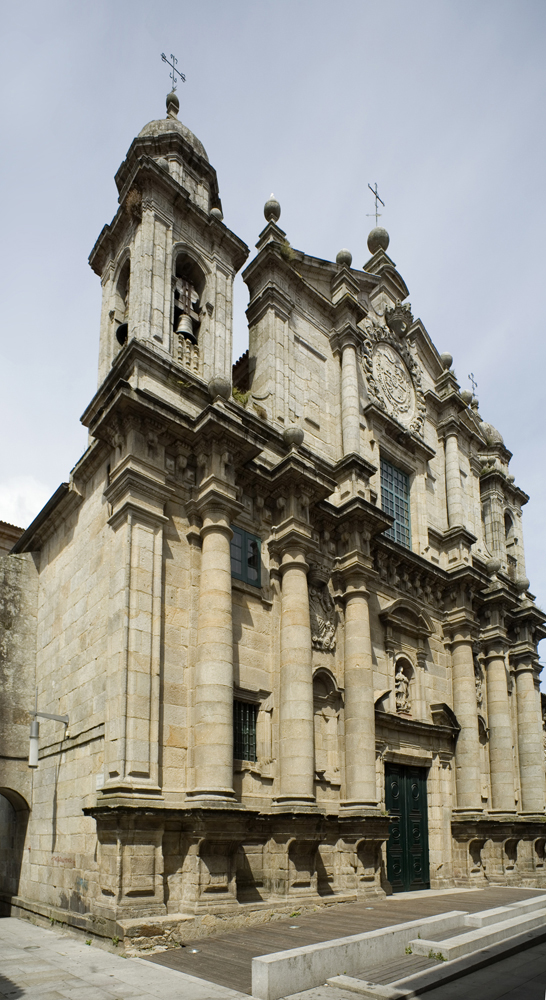

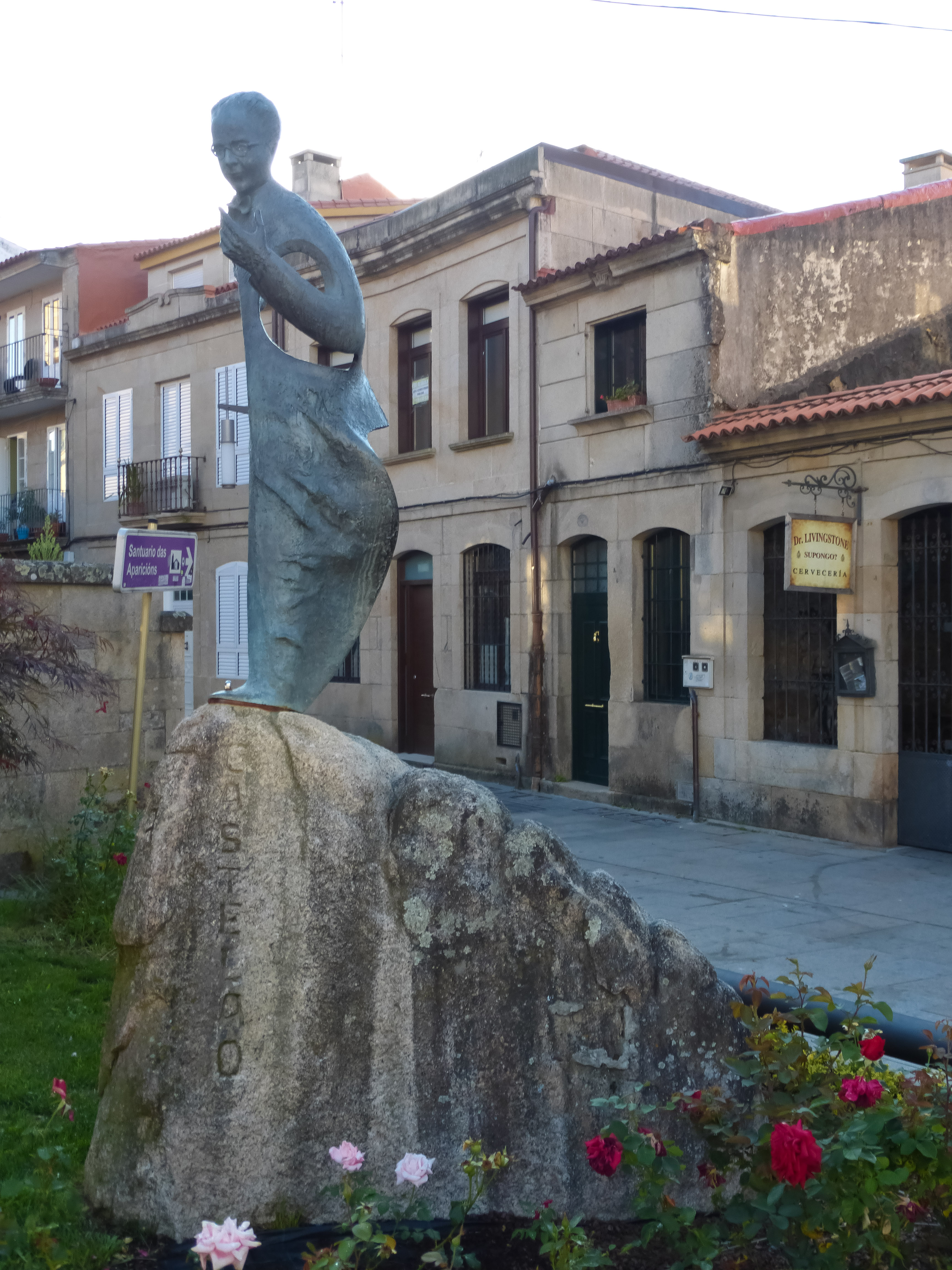

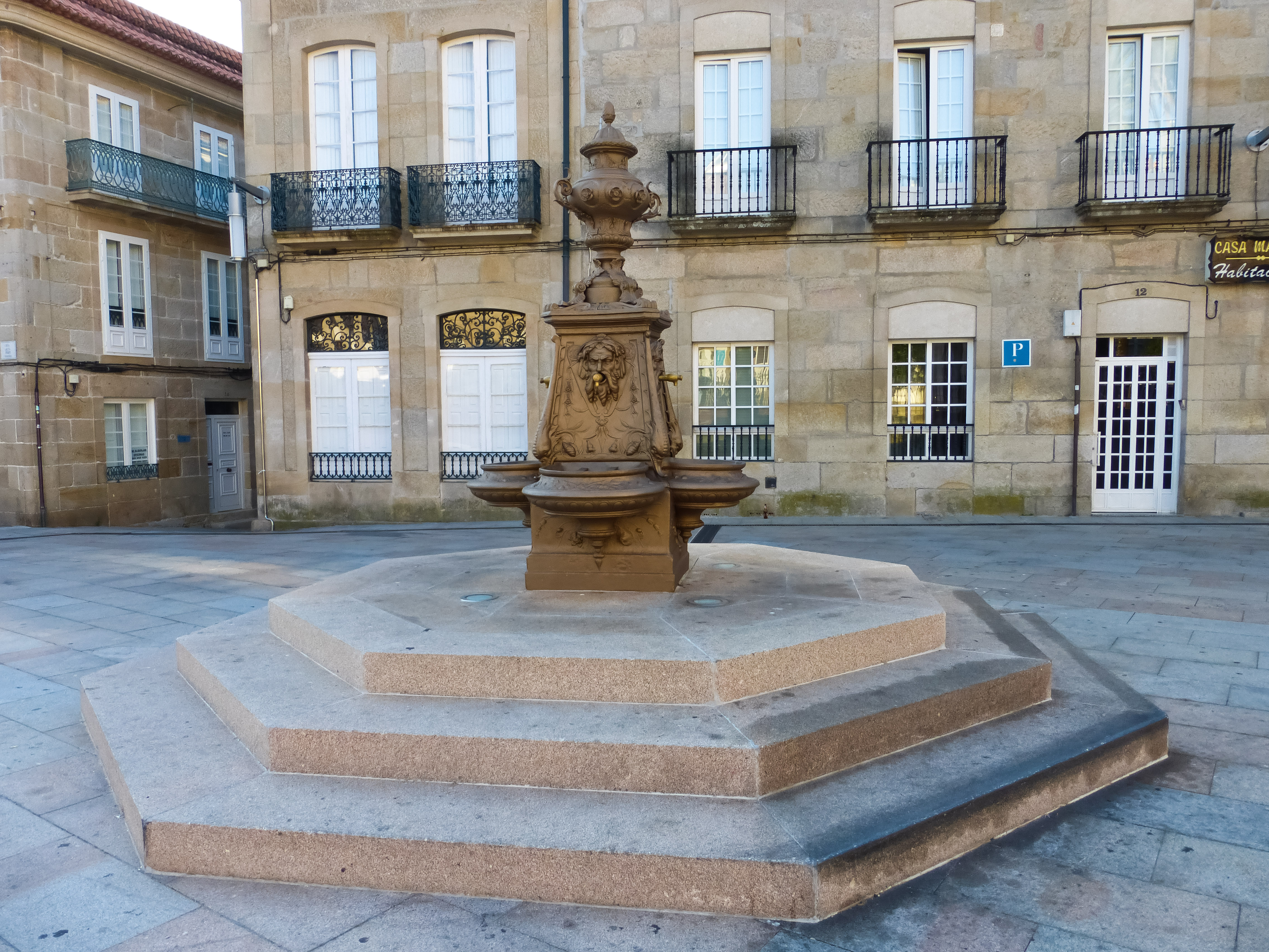

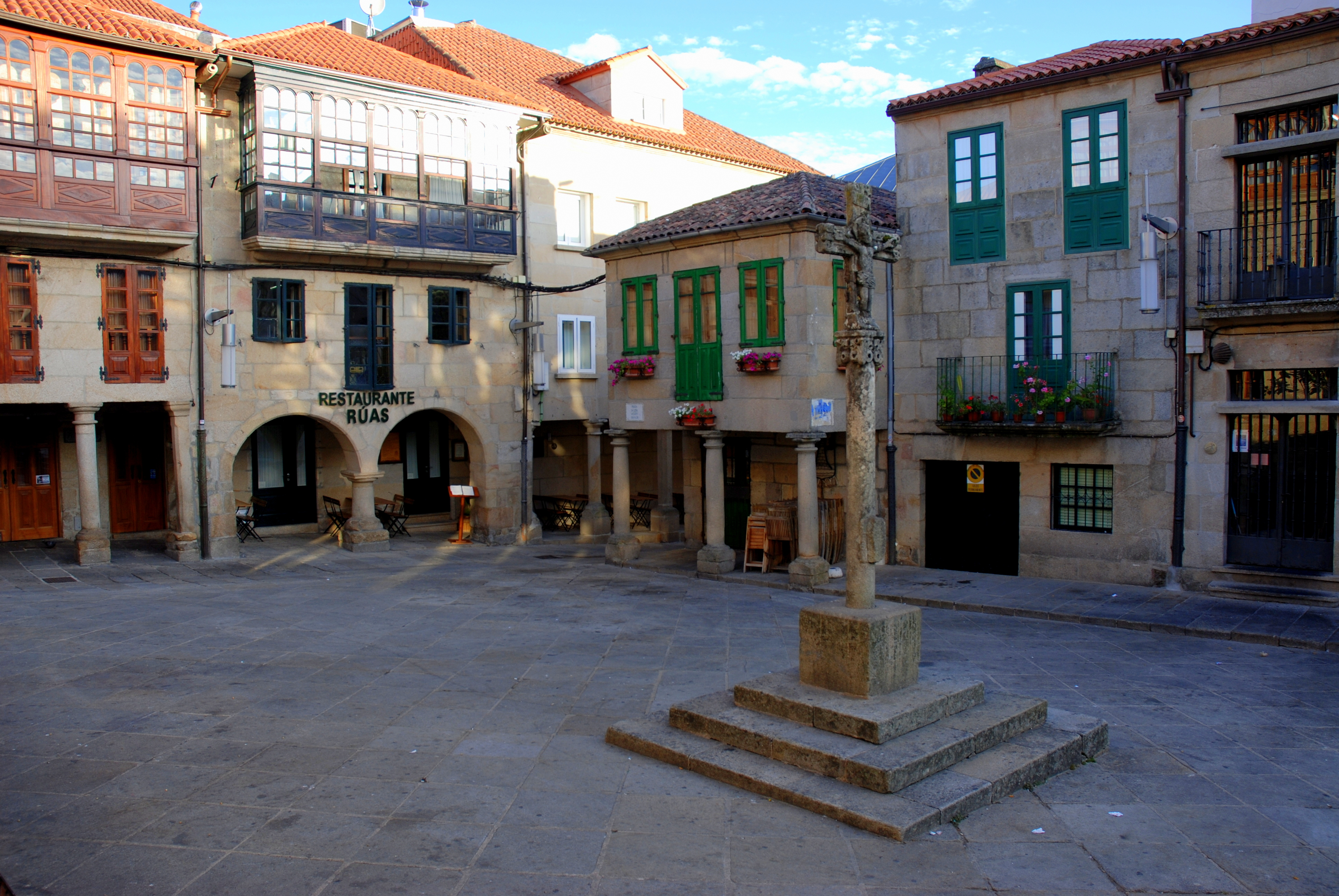

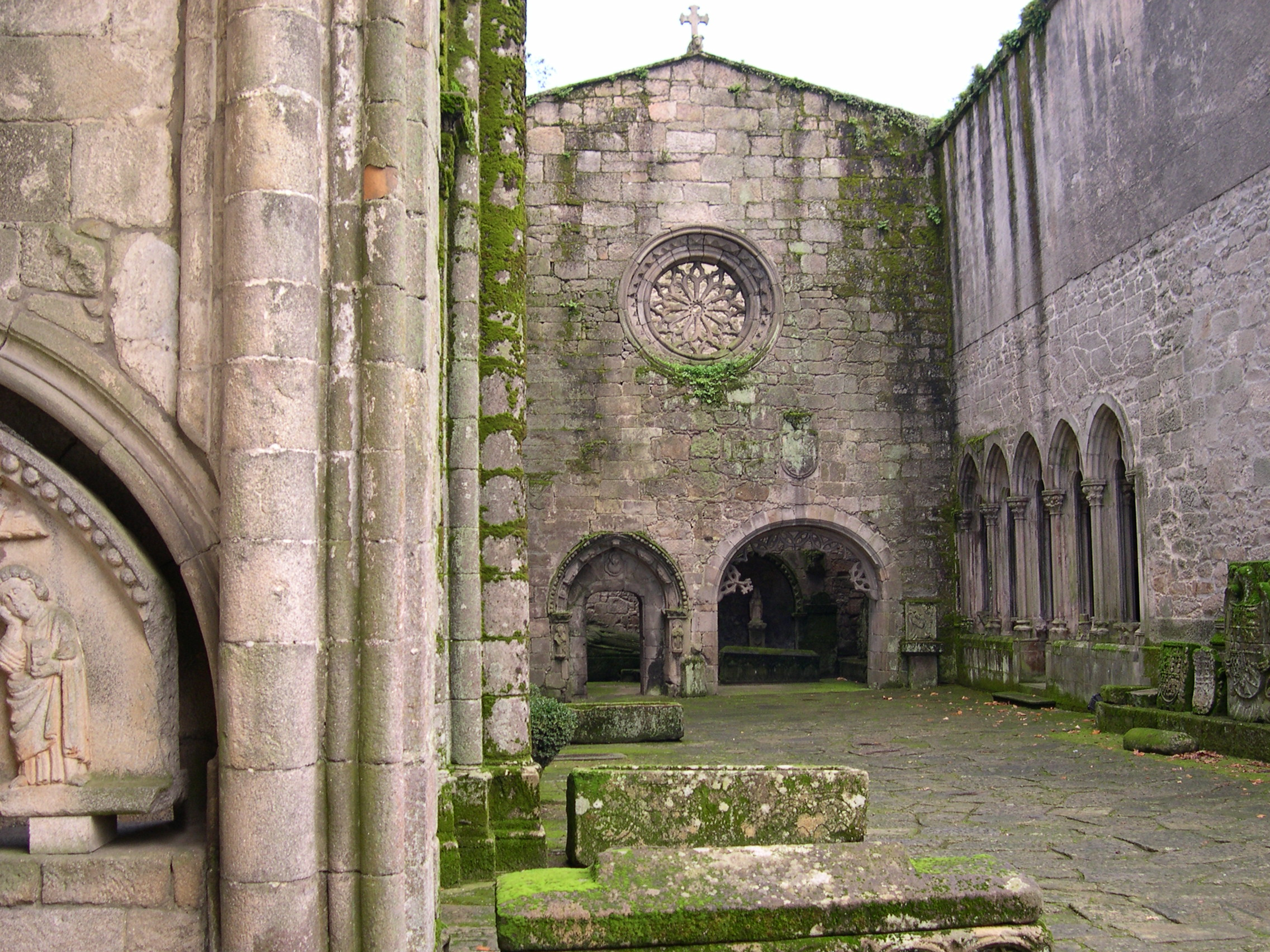

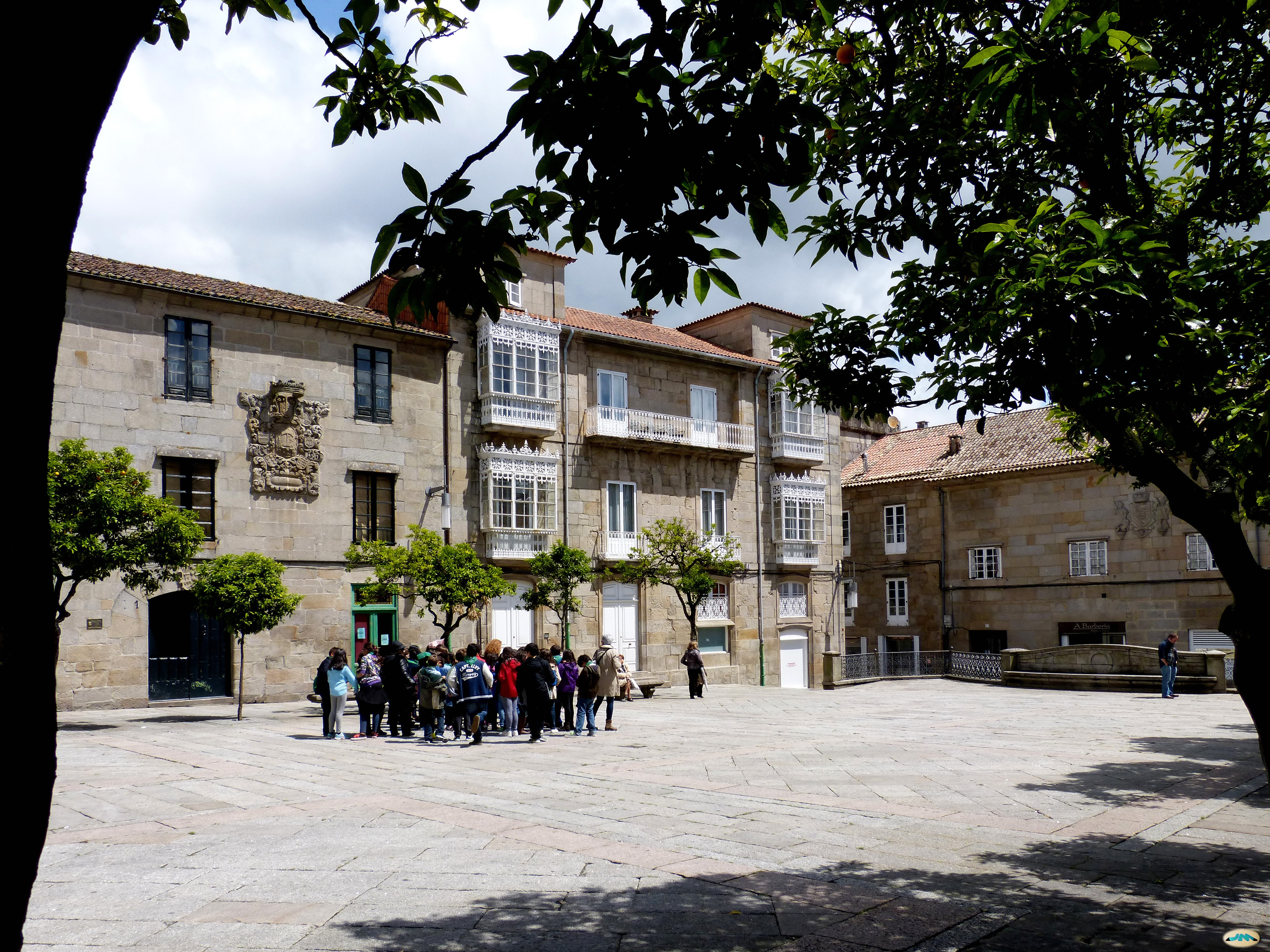

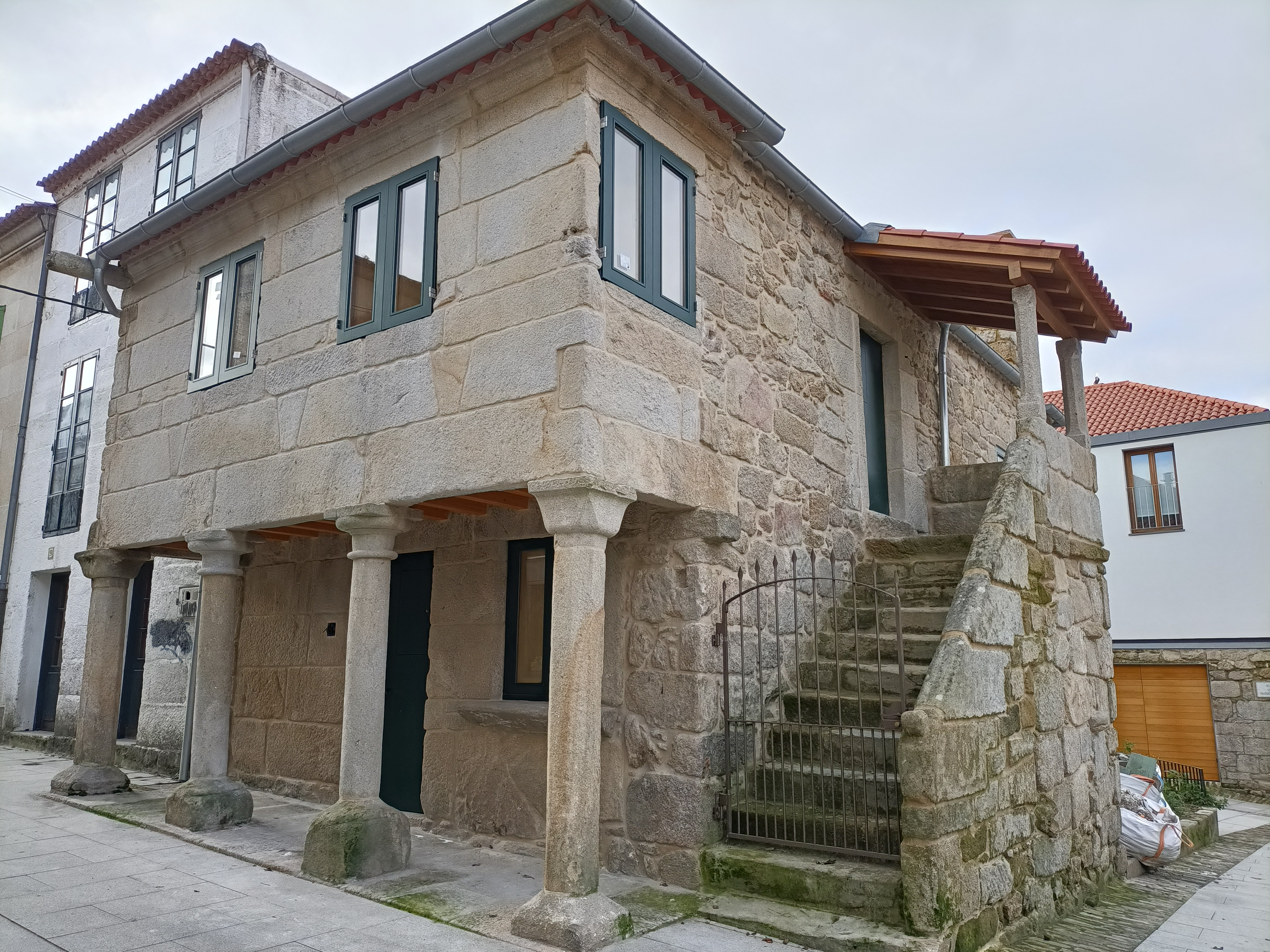

== Bibliography ==
- Aganzo, Carlos (2010). Pontevedra. Ciudades con encanto (in Spanish). Madrid: El País-Aguilar. p. 10; 18. ISBN 978-8403509344.
- Durán Villa, Francisco (2000). Provincia de Pontevedra (in Spanish). Madrid: Editorial Mediterráneo. p. 78. ISBN 8471563371.
- Pombo, Antón (2012). Un corto viaje a Galicia (in Spanish). Madrid: Anaya Touring. pp. 61–62. ISBN 978-84-9935-331-9.
- Riveiro Tobío, Elvira (2008). Descubrir Pontevedra (in Spanish). Pontevedra: Edicións do Cumio. p. 8. ISBN 9788482890852.
- Saavedra, Segundo (2011). Un corto viaje a Rías Bajas (in Spanish). Madrid: Anaya Touring. pp. 36–37, 44. ISBN 978-84-9776-890-0.

== See also ==
=== Related articles ===
- Walls of Pontevedra
- Pontevedra Museum
- Fountain of La Herrería
