= Plaza de la Pedreira =

Medieval square in Pontevedra, Spain

Pedreira or Mugartegui square
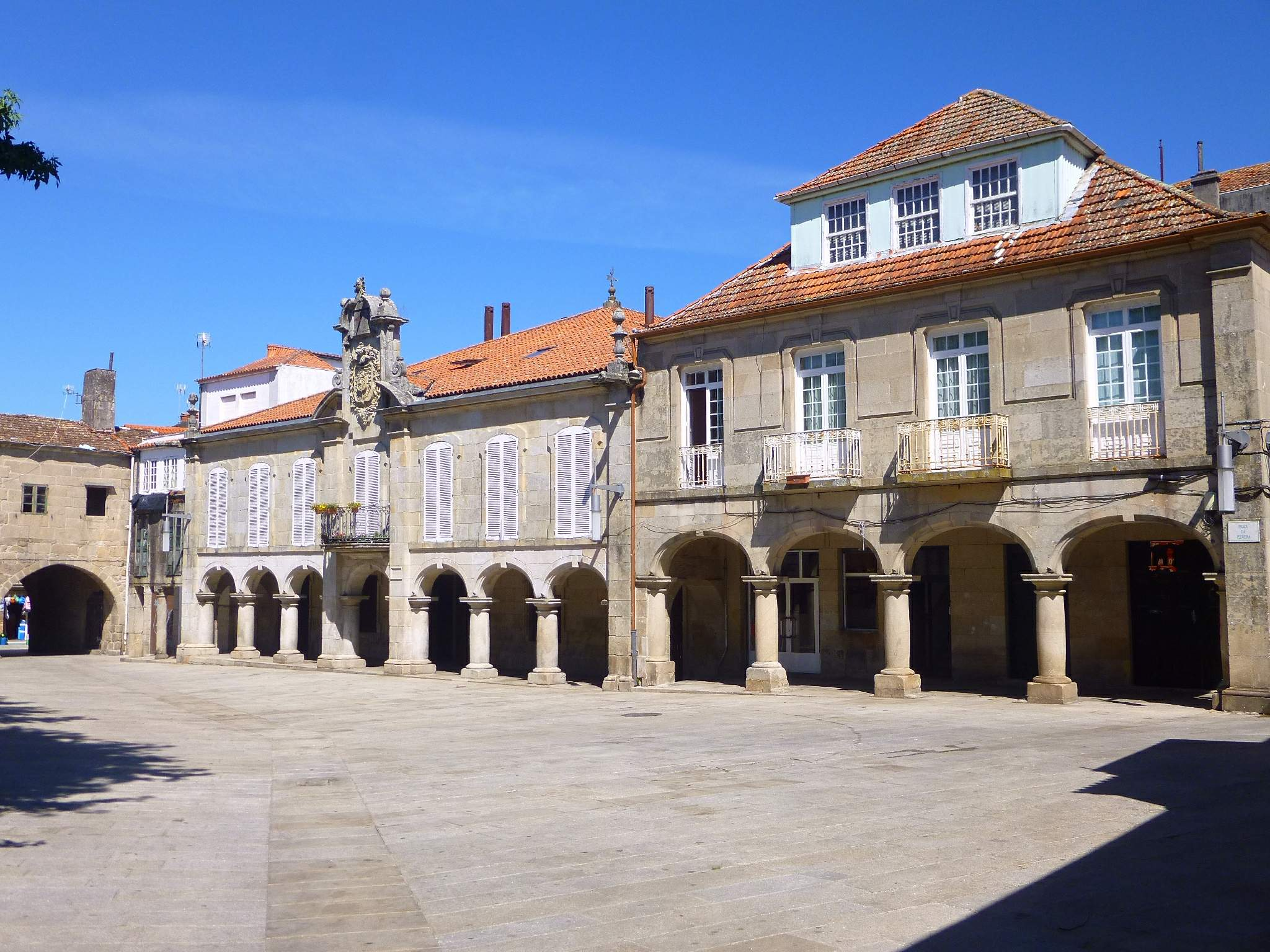
- Pedreira square
- Native name: Plaza de la Pedreira o de Mugartegui (Spanish)
- Type: plaza
- Maintained by: Pontevedra City Council
- Location: Pontevedra, Spain
- Postal code: 36002
- Coordinates: 42.433417°N 8.643417°W

The Plaza de la Pedreira (Stone Quarry Square) or Plaza de Mugartegui (Galician: Praza da Pedreira) is a square of medieval origin located in the northern part of the old town of Pontevedra (Spain).

== Origin of the name ==
The square takes its name from the work of the stonemasons who carved the stone for the town's houses at this location.

== History ==
In ancient times, this area was called Vicus del Verrón. The Pedreira square has its origins in the Middle Ages. It was an esplanade on cultivated land, mainly vineyards, and was known as Eirado da Herba, as it was the place of the grass market.

The current name of the square derives from its later use, which recalls the place where the stonemasons worked the stone for the city's buildings, such as the nearby College of the Society of Jesus, the Church of Saint Bartholomew or the Palace of Mugartegui, for which a large quantity of stone was accumulated in the square. This was the area of the city inhabited by the stonemasons.

In 1479, Tristán de Montenegro, captain of the troops of Pontevedra in the succession to the throne of Castile, died in the pazo Mariño de Lobeira, which overlooks the square, mortally wounded by musket fire. For years, a light has remained lit in the room where he died to remind us of his glorious death.

In January 1886, the square was renamed Mugartegui Square. The Municipal Corporation of Pontevedra agreed to change the name of the Plaza de la Pedreira to Plaza de Mugartegui to honour Francisco Javier Mugartegui, owner of the pazo de Mugartegui, lawyer, businessman, and politician of Pontevedra, for his interest in the prosperity of Pontevedra.

On 25 April 1996, the traditional name of Plaza de la Pedreira replaced the name of Plaza de Mugartegui.

== Description ==
The square is located in the northern part of the historic centre of Pontevedra and its configuration has undergone some variations over time. It has an irregular trapezoidal shape, slightly curved on the south side, where there is a large stone wall. This wall belonged to the Casa de la Misericordia (House of Mercy), owned by the Bermúdez de Castro family.

The square is an almost closed paved space with only two simple stone benches next to the large stone wall on the south side and another on the west side next to Mariño de Lobeira's mansion. The square can be accessed from César Boente Street, passing under the arch of this manor house, or from Pedreira, Padre Isla or Gregorio Fernández Street.

== Outstanding buildings ==
The buildings surrounding the square date from different periods, from the early modern period to the 18th and 19th centuries.

The central part of the north side of the square is presided over by the pazo de Mugartegui, which was originally the pazo of the Counts of Fefiñáns. This Baroque pazo was completed in 1771 and its large stone coat of arms was put up in 1773. The pazo has seven arches on its façade, supported by Tuscan columns. On the upper part of the stone coat of arms, there is a sundial.

On the west side of the square is the Pazo de Mariño de Lobeira, a 16th-century Gothic building, with some later modifications. It was built by the lords of Serra de Outes, Lobeira, Montenegro, and Soutomaior. It consists of a ground floor and a first floor and has a characteristic passage on the ground floor with two pointed arches that give access to the square. The Pazo has been used for various purposes throughout its history, including as a guest house.

On the east side of the square is an 18th-century house with a ground and upper floor and an external staircase to access it.

== Gallery ==
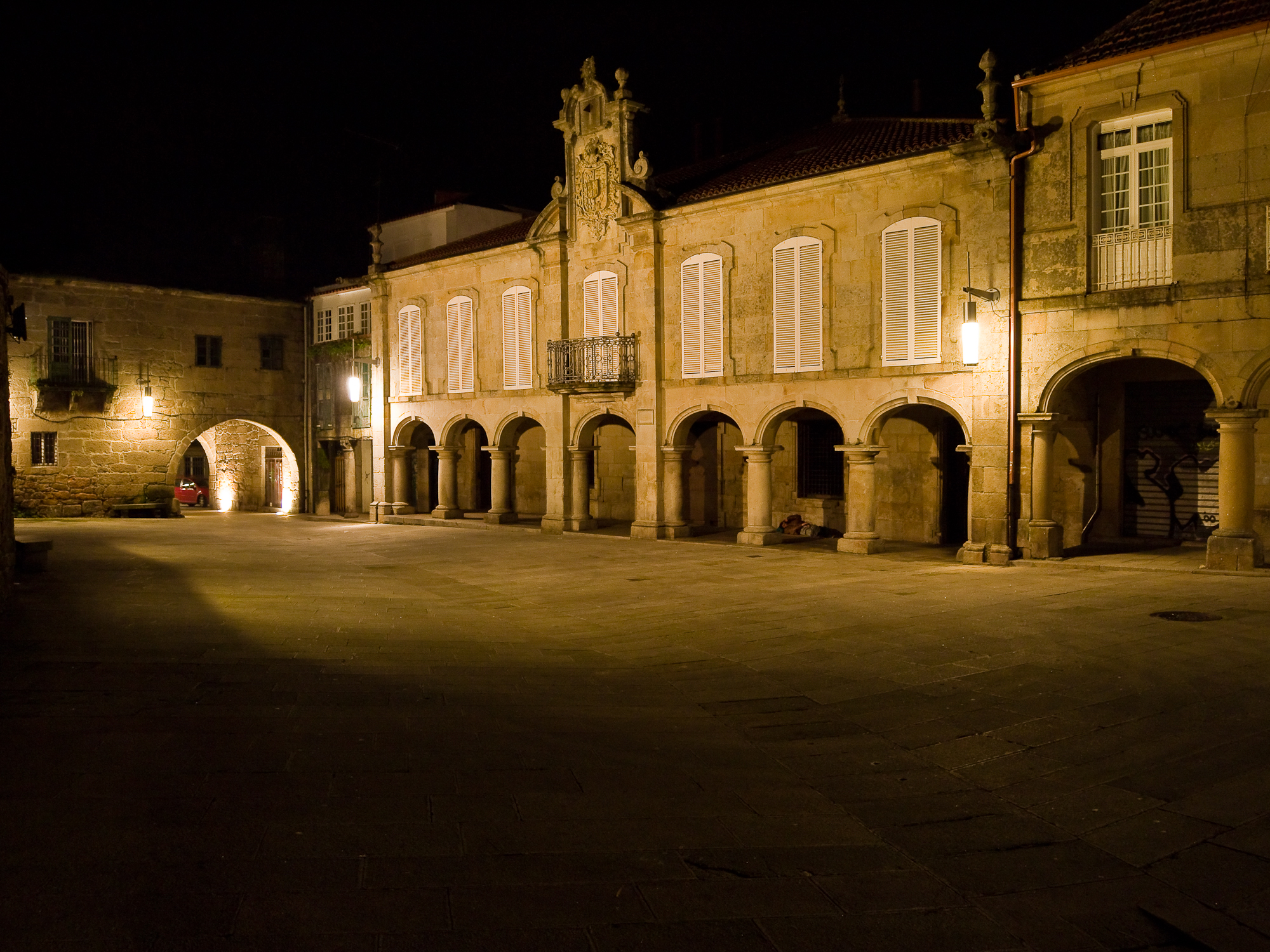
The square at night.

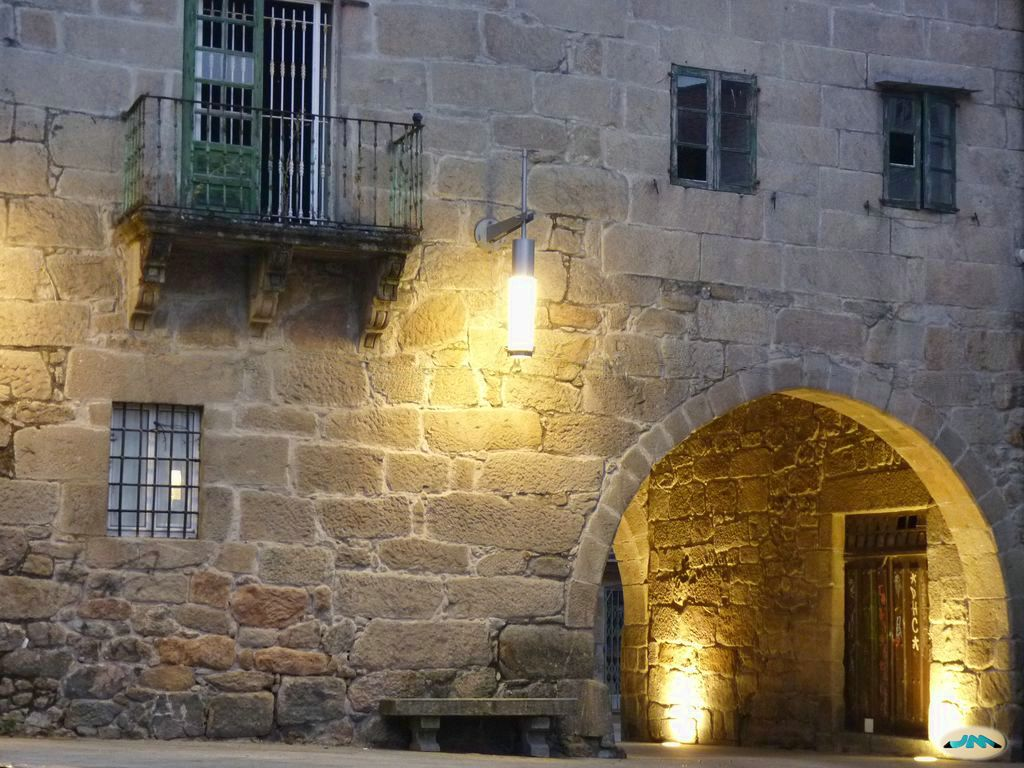
Pazo Mariño de Lobeira.

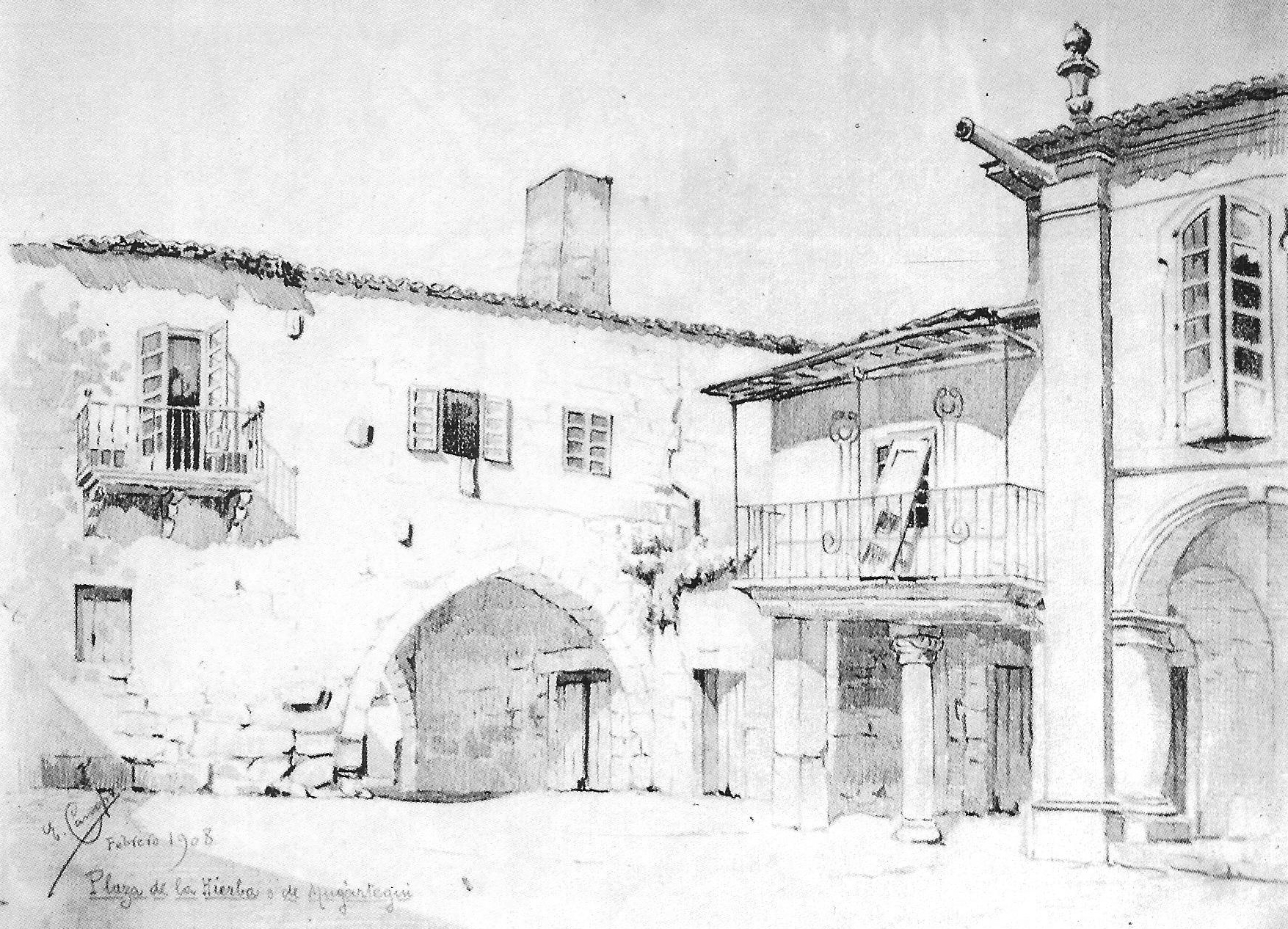
Drawing by Enrique Campo Sobrino (1908)

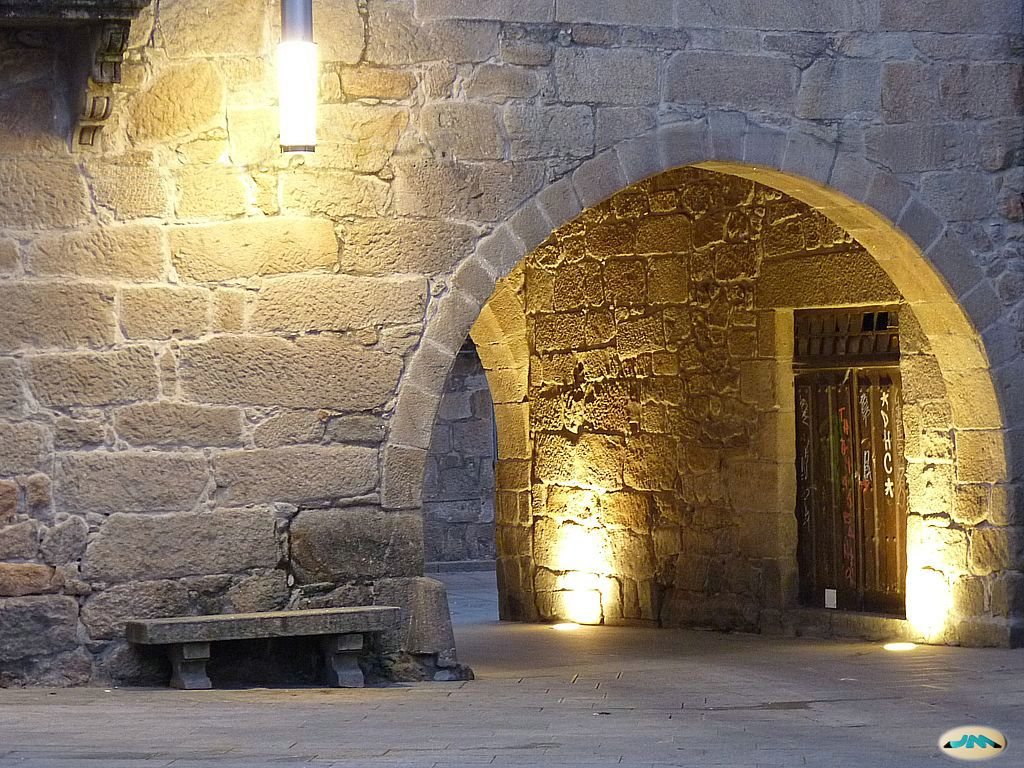
Pointed arch for access to the square.

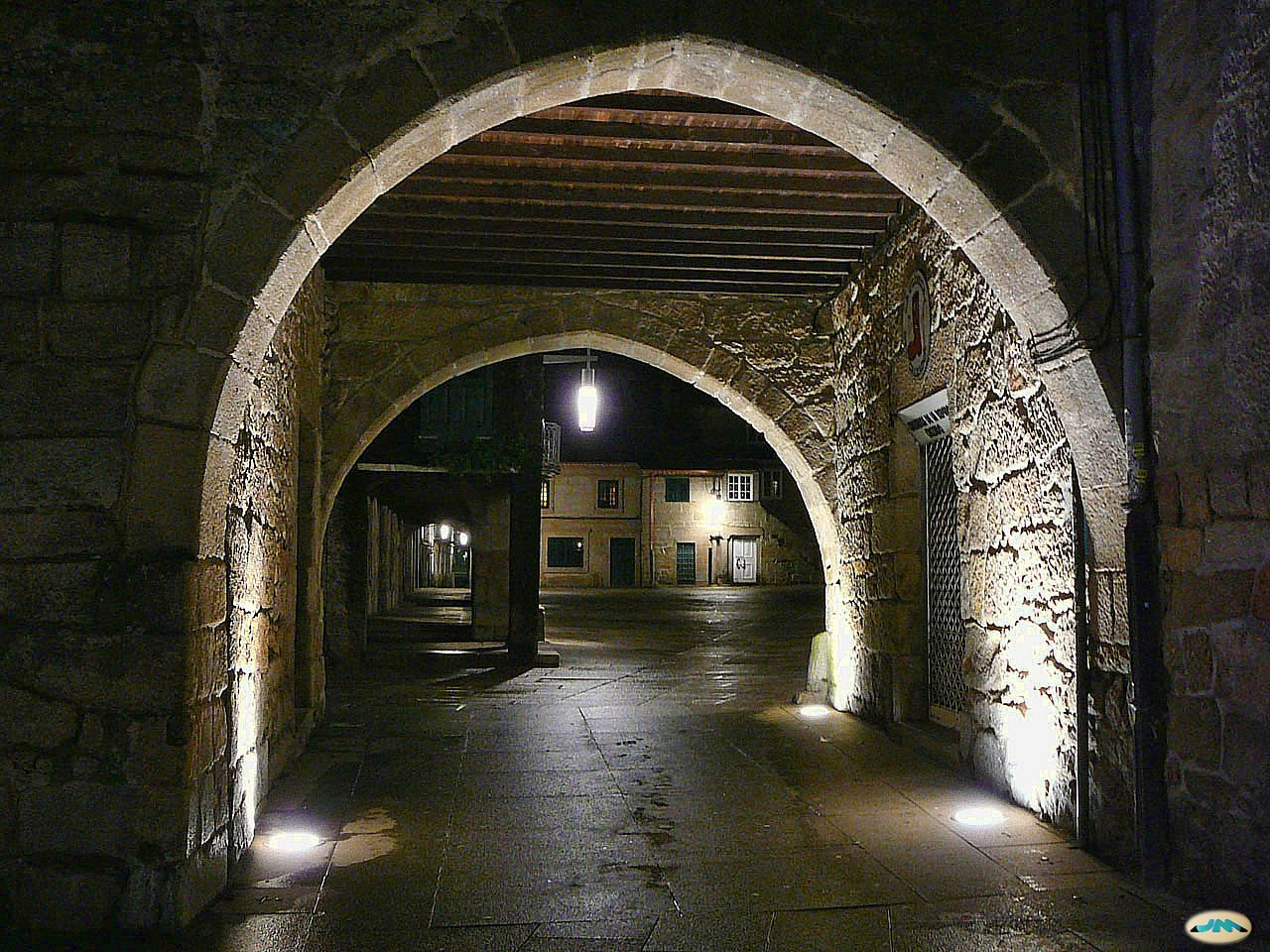
Access passage to the square.

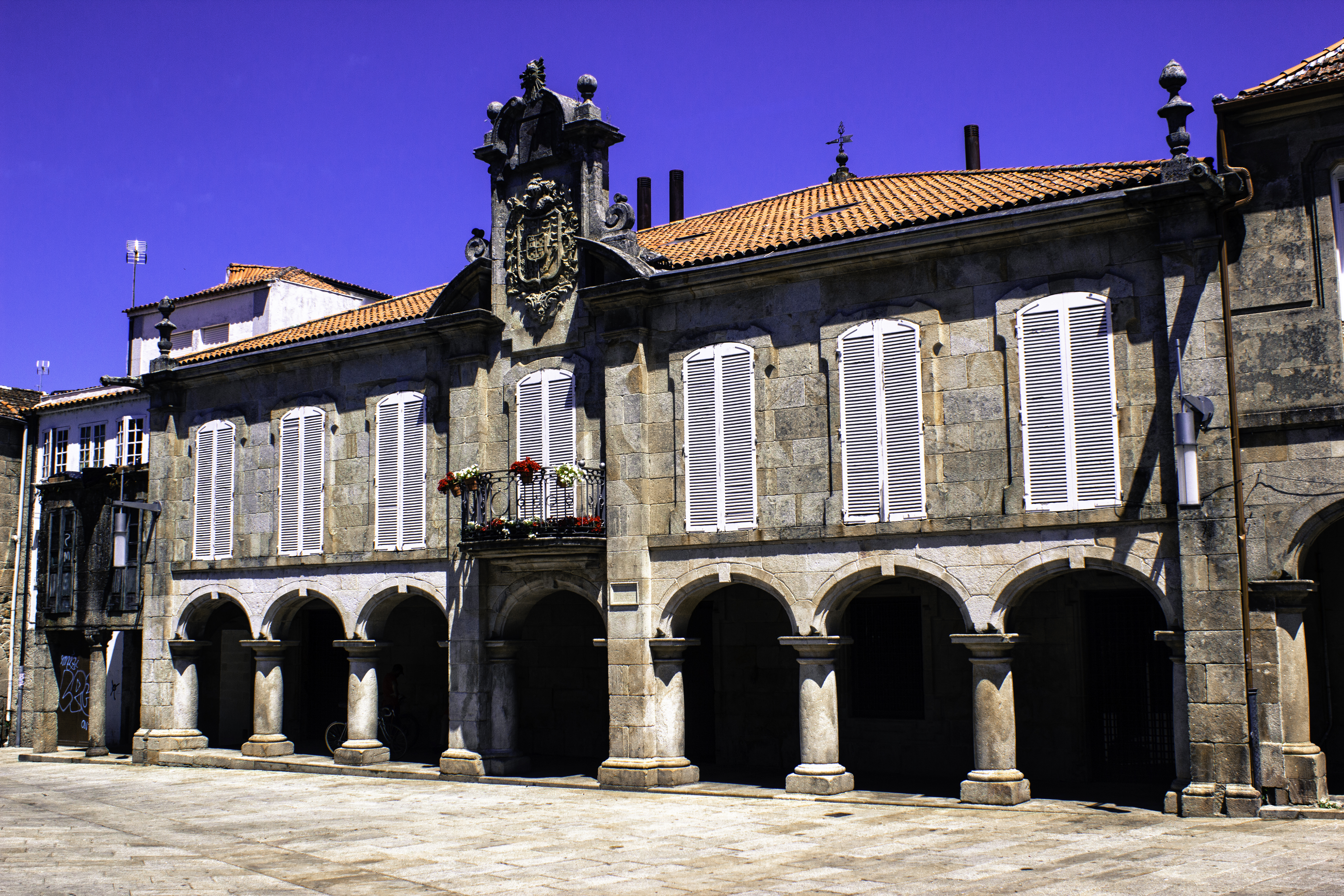
Pazo de Mugartegui

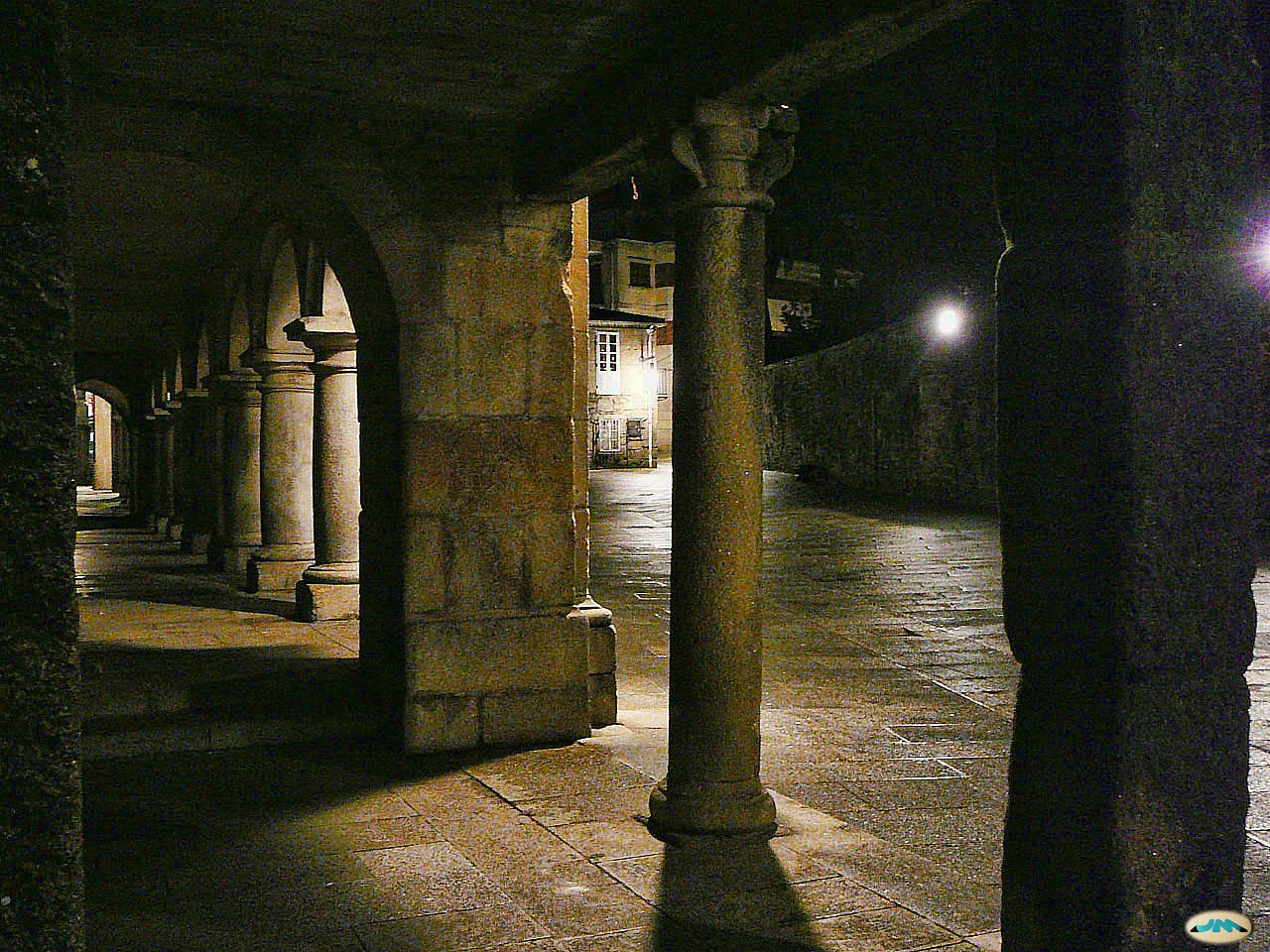
Arcades in the square

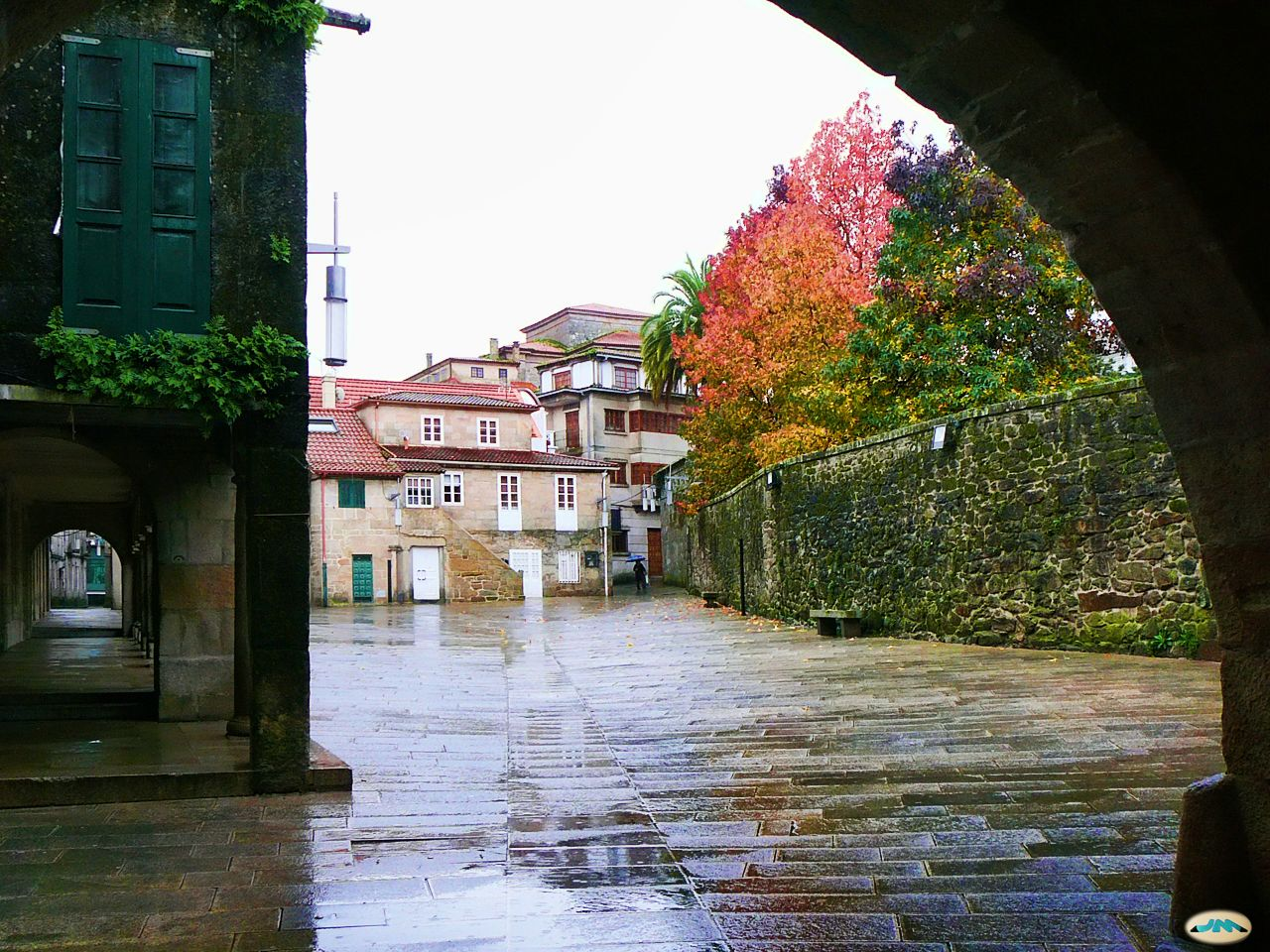
Wall surrounding the square.

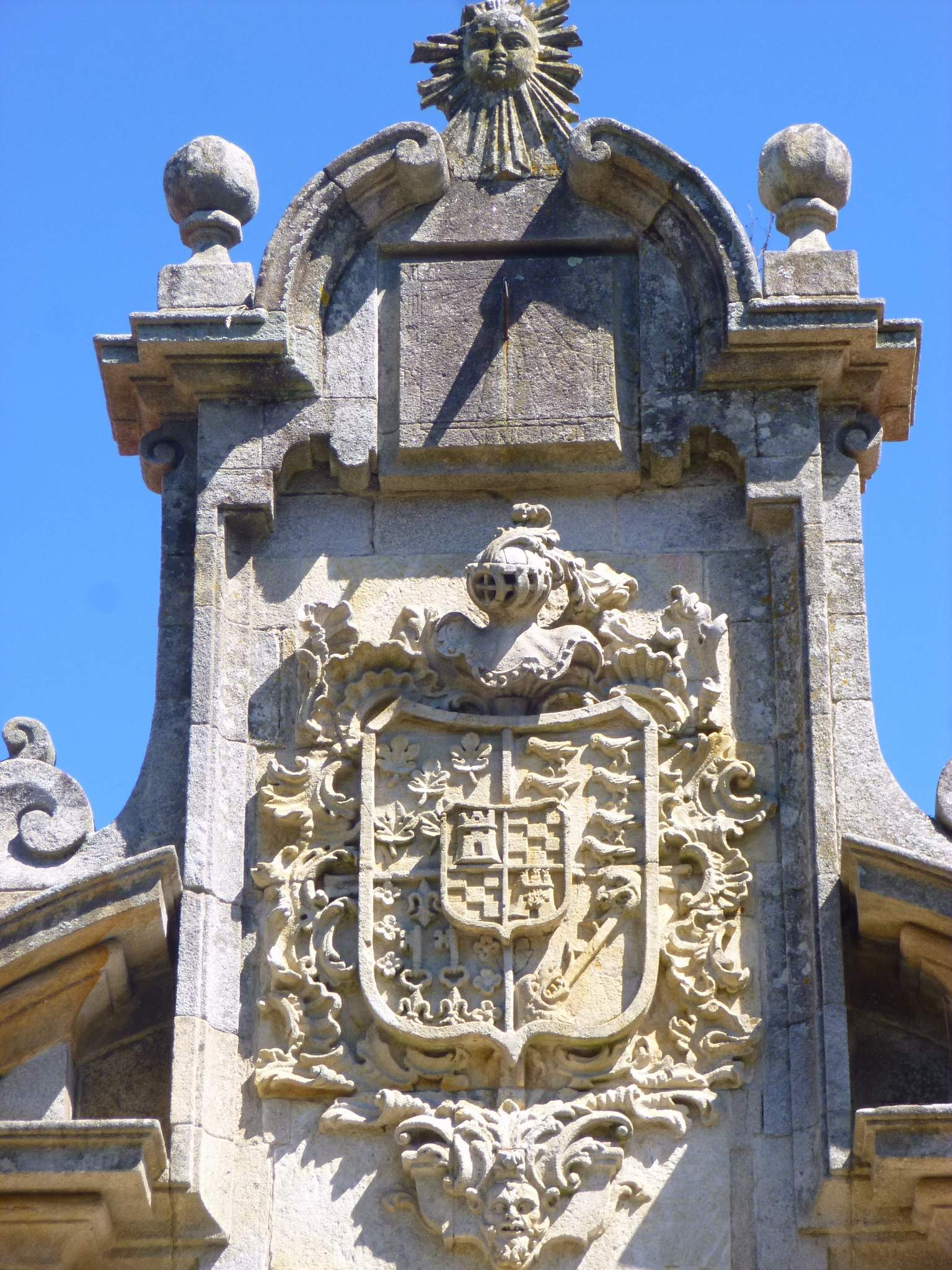
Coat of arms of the palace de Mugartegui.

== See also ==
- Old town of Pontevedra

== Bibliography ==
- Aganzo, Carlos (2010): Pontevedra. Ciudades con encanto. El País Aguilar. ISBN 8403509340. p. 62.
- Fontoira Surís, Rafael (2009): Pontevedra monumental. Diputación de Pontevedra. ISBN 8484573273.
- Nieto González, Remigio (1980) : Guía monumental ilustrada de Pontevedra. Asociación de Comerciantes de la Calle Manuel Quiroga, Pontevedra. p. 34.
- Riveiro Tobío, E. (2008): Descubrir Pontevedra. Edicións do Cumio, Pontevedra. p. 40-41. ISBN 8482890859. p. 39.
