= Plaza de Teucro =

Picturesque medieval square in Pontevedra, Spain

Teucer square
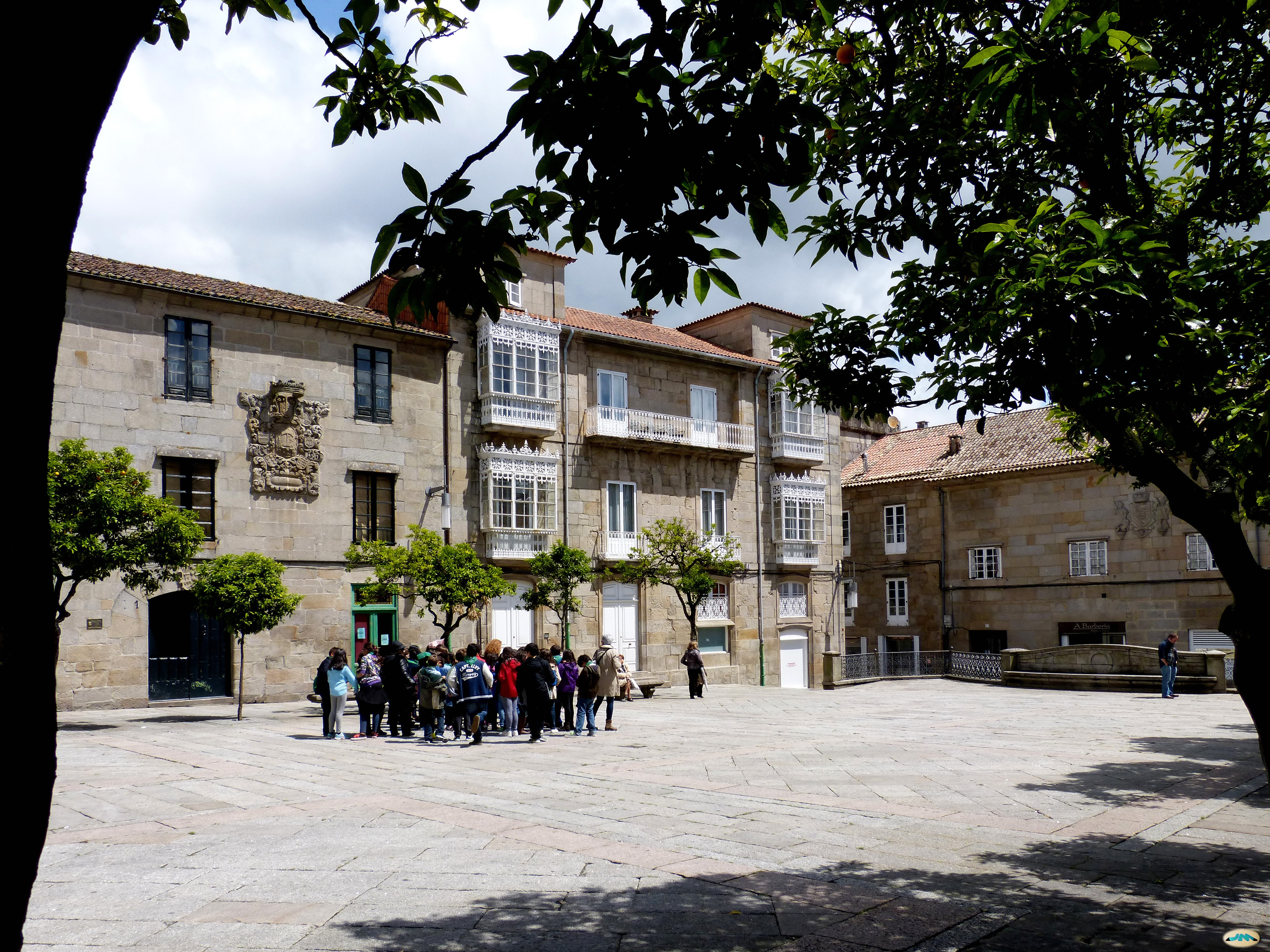
- Teucer square
- Native name: Plaza de Teucro (Galician)
- Type: plaza
- Maintained by: Pontevedra City Council
- Location: Pontevedra, Spain
- Postal code: 36002
- Coordinates: 42.432795°N 8.645432°W

The Plaza de Teucro (Teucer Square) is a square of medieval origin located in the heart of the old town of Pontevedra, Spain. It is the most harmoniously proportioned medieval square in the city.

== Etymology ==
The current name of the square dates from 1843. It is named after Teucer, the mythical founder of the city, son of King Telamon (King of Salamis), who is said to have followed a mermaid, Leucoiña, in exile to the Ria de Pontevedra and founded the city. Before, the square was called Plaza de la Villa and Plaza Mayor because it was the most central square in Pontevedra and the most important due to the Pazos of the noble families surrounding it. It was also called Plaza de Aranda (because the Marquis of Aranda had his pazo there), Plaza del Pan, because of the sale of bread and the bread ovens that were located nearby and Plaza de las Semillas as seeds were sold there four times a month. In the 19th century it was also called Plaza de la Leche because milk was sold there.

== History ==
The first mentions of the square date back to 1336. In 1396, it had already given its name to the street of Azogue (rúa do Açougue, current Isabel II street), which came from the Basilica of Saint Mary Major. The square adopted its present configuration with the surrounding buildings in the 18th century.

In the beginning, it was known as Plaza del Azogue and was designed as a meeting place and a market for the daily sale of foodstuffs. Later, the square became known as Plaza de la Villa or Plaza Mayor, as it was the main square of the city where the administrative activity was concentrated: the town hall was located here and it was here that the main noble families had their Pazos. In the lower part is the Rúa Real (Royal Street), which was also the most important street and axis of the city at the time. The square was also used as a stage for theatrical performances when there was no theatre in the city.

In 1809, the central 18th century house located to the west of the square (at number 8) served as headquarters for the occupying French troops. General Franceschi lived there and Marshal Ney spent a night there. Later, from 1886, this house was the headquarters of the Bank of Spain in the city.

In 1848, a small theatre was set up in the Plaza de Teucro, until the Teatro-Liceo opened in 1878. On 2 June 1858, the Liceo Casino moved to the Pazo of the Counts of San Román and remained there until the inauguration of its own building on 2 August 1878.

== Description ==
It is a square designed on an almost rectangular plan, bordered by Pazos. It is an urban square of geometric proportions, rectangular and slightly irregular on its southern side. Princesa Street in its upper part (separated from it by a small drop) and Real Street in its lower part (separated by a small wall, a fountain and a balustrade) run alongside the square.

The square is surrounded by large Pazos of noble families: to the north the pazo of Gago and Montenegro, to the east the pazo of the Marquis of Aranda, to the south the palace of the Counts of San Román and to the west noble houses with arcades such as that of the Pita family.

The pazo of the Marquis of Aranda is located at a lower level at the level of Real Street. Closing the eastern part of the square and in front of this pazo is a monumental stone fountain built in 1970 attached to the small wall that closes the square on the eastern side. The square has six stone benches and twelve orange trees lined up symmetrically on its north and south sides.

== Outstanding buildings ==
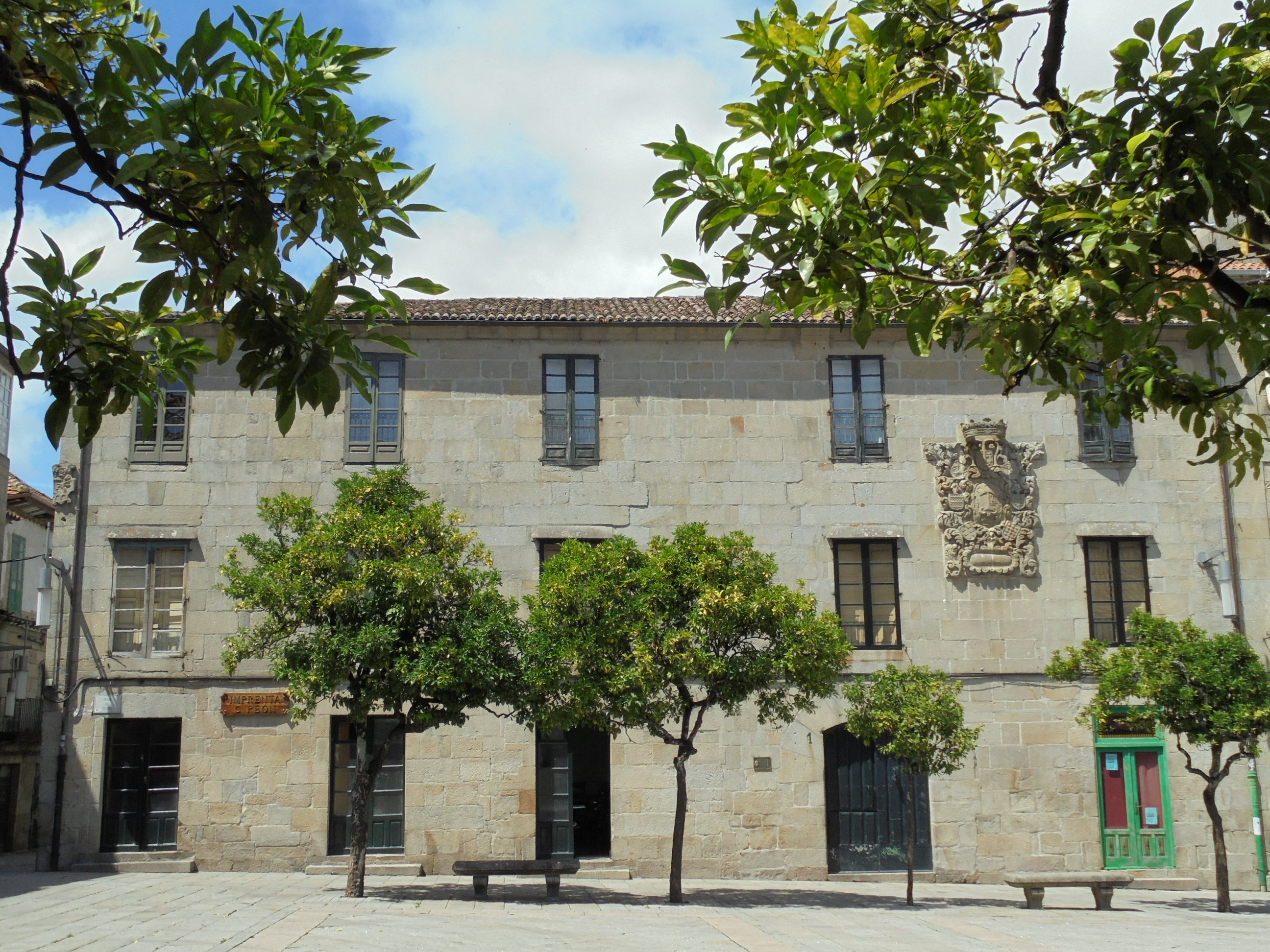
Gago and Montenegro pazo.

On the north side of the square is the Pazo de los Gago y Montenegro, from the 16th century, with a Gothic arch in the door and five Voussoirs. On its façade it has the most imposing coat of arms in the town, a large baroque stone coat of arms from 1716 with eight coats of arms inside, bearing the arms of the Gago, Ozores, Tavares, Montenegro, Mendoza, Sotomayor, Oca, Castro and Sarmiento families. It refers to the occupation of the Gago family as guardians of the gate of the walls of Pontevedra in the tower of the Burgo Bridge. The pazo was renovated in the 18th century by Antonio Félix Tavares de Tavora. It has a ground floor, two upper floors and five balcony windows on each floor.

On the east side, on the edge of Calle Real, is the Pazo of the Marquis of Aranda (mayor of the Kingdom of Galicia) from the beginning of the 18th century, with a crenellated tower (at the beginning it had two crenellated towers at its ends) and a coat of arms on its large facade with the only figures of two holders on each side in a coat of arms of the city.

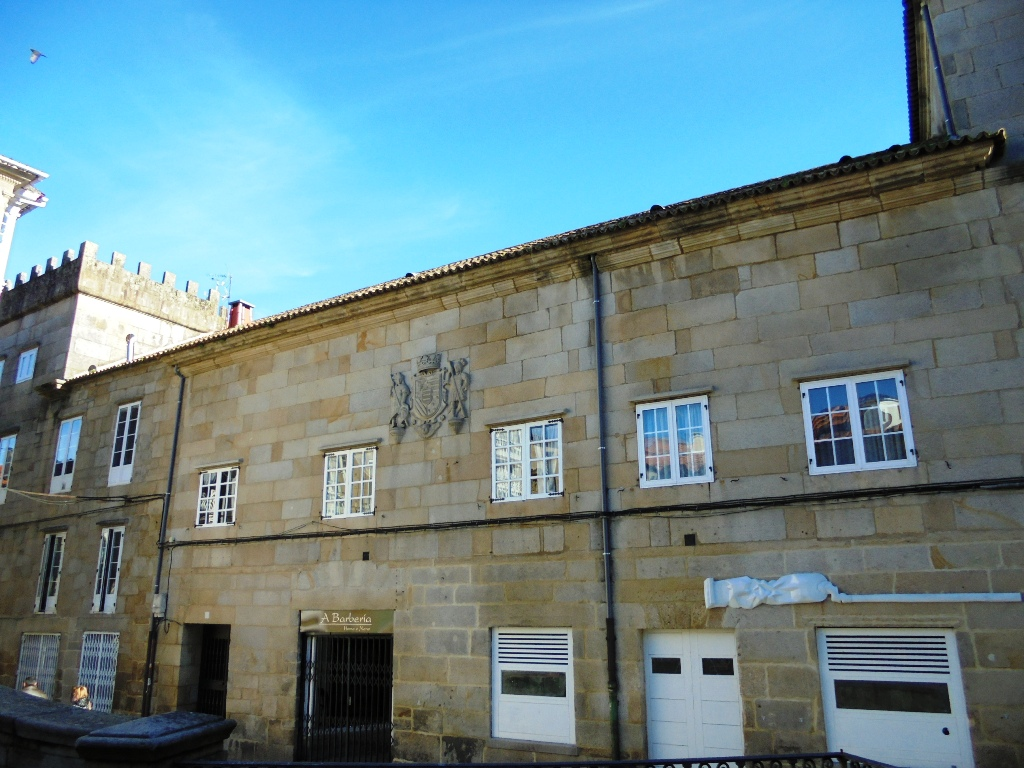
Marquis de Aranda pazo.

On the south side of the square is the rear façade of the Palace of the Counts of San Román, dating from the 17th century, which was the largest palace in the city. The façade now has walled arcades and has lost its crenellated tower with six balconies. It has columns of Tuscan Roman order. Inside the palace there is a small chapel with a baroque altarpiece.

On the west side of the square there are Baroque houses with coats of arms and arcades on the ground floor, among which the 18th-century house of the Pita family stands out in the centre, with a large balcony.

== The square in popular culture ==
The printing house C. Peón has been located in the square since January 1902. Classics of Galician literature were printed there, such as the first edition of Os vellos non-deben de namorarse by Castelao, in 1953. Other Galician writers of the time, such as Celso Emilio Ferreiro and Fermín Bouza Brey, also published their books there. Painters such as Carlos Sobrino and Leopoldo Nóvoa Garcia also printed their lithographs there.

== Gallery ==
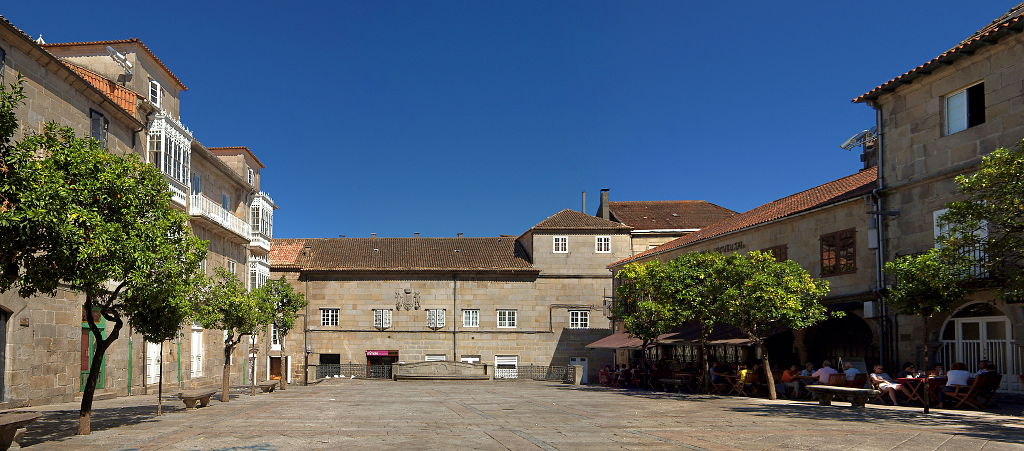
Square with the Pazo of the Marquis of Aranda in the background

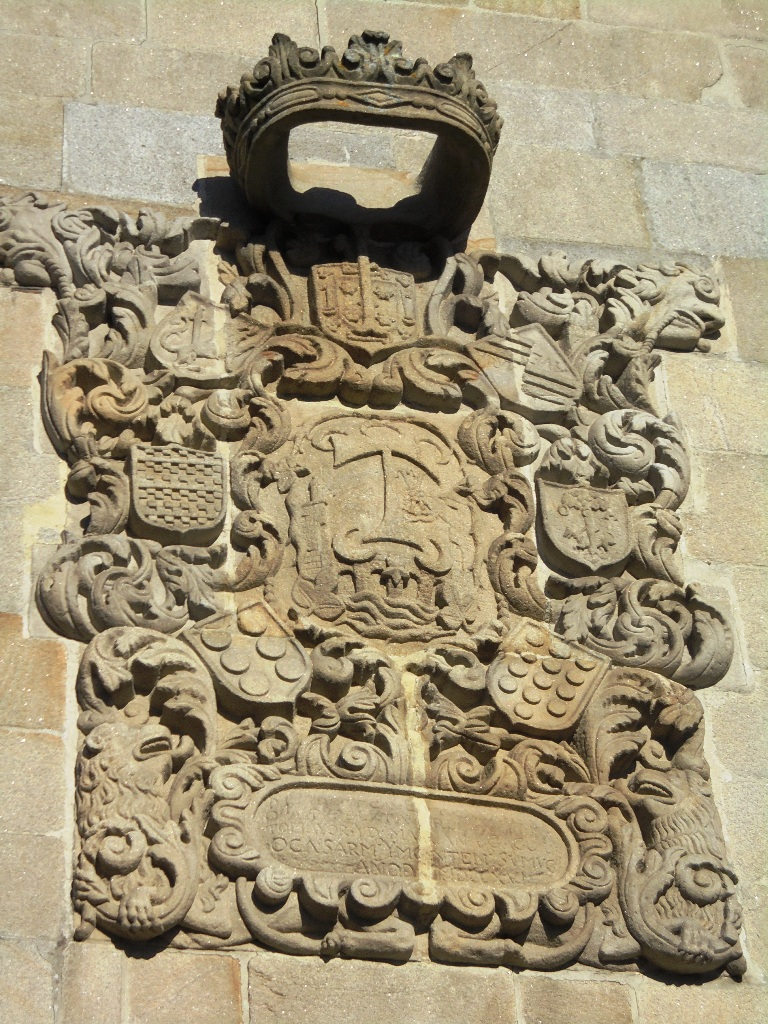
Coat of arms of the Pazo of Gago and Montenegro

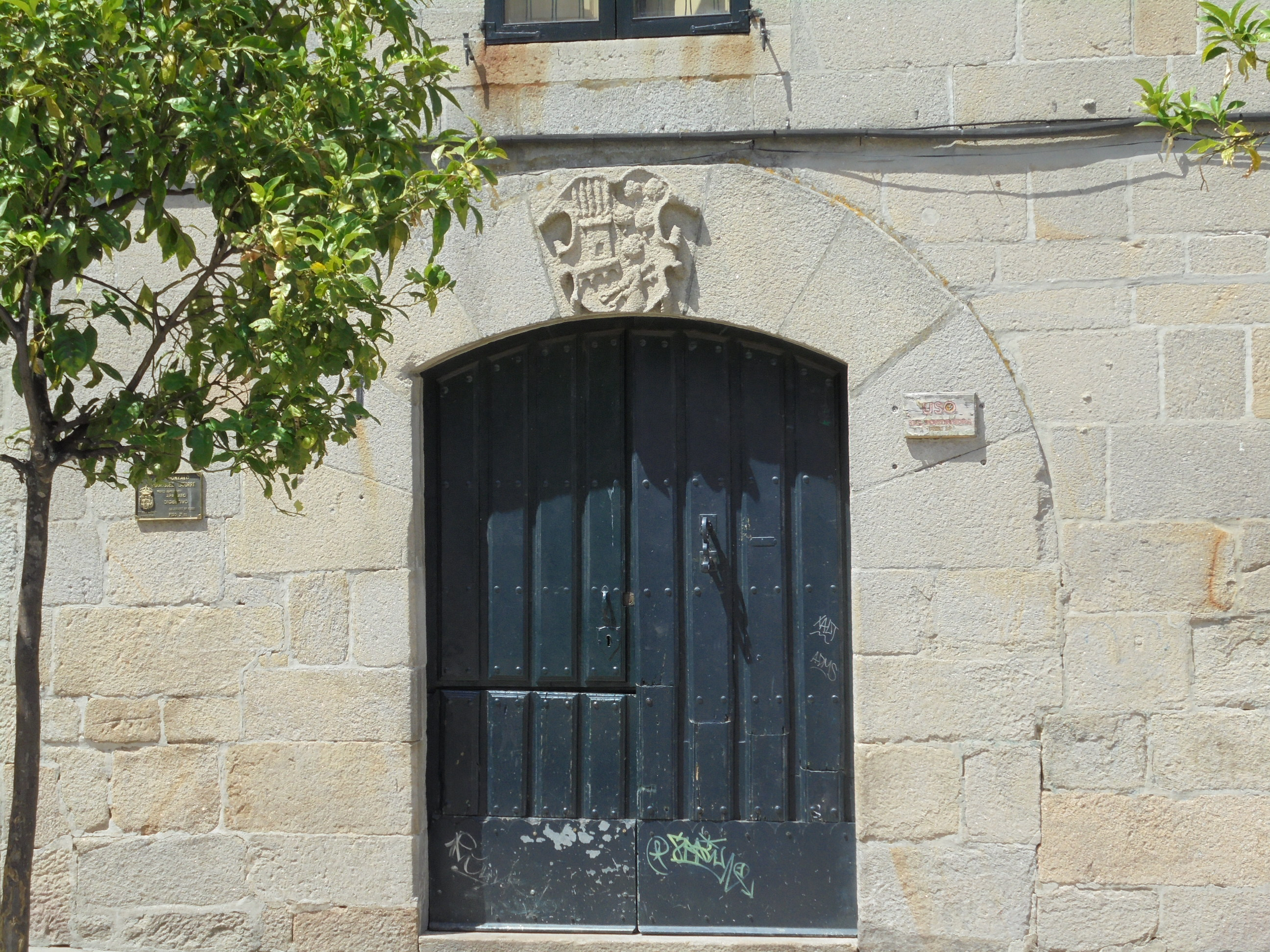
Main door of the Pazo de Gago and Montenegro

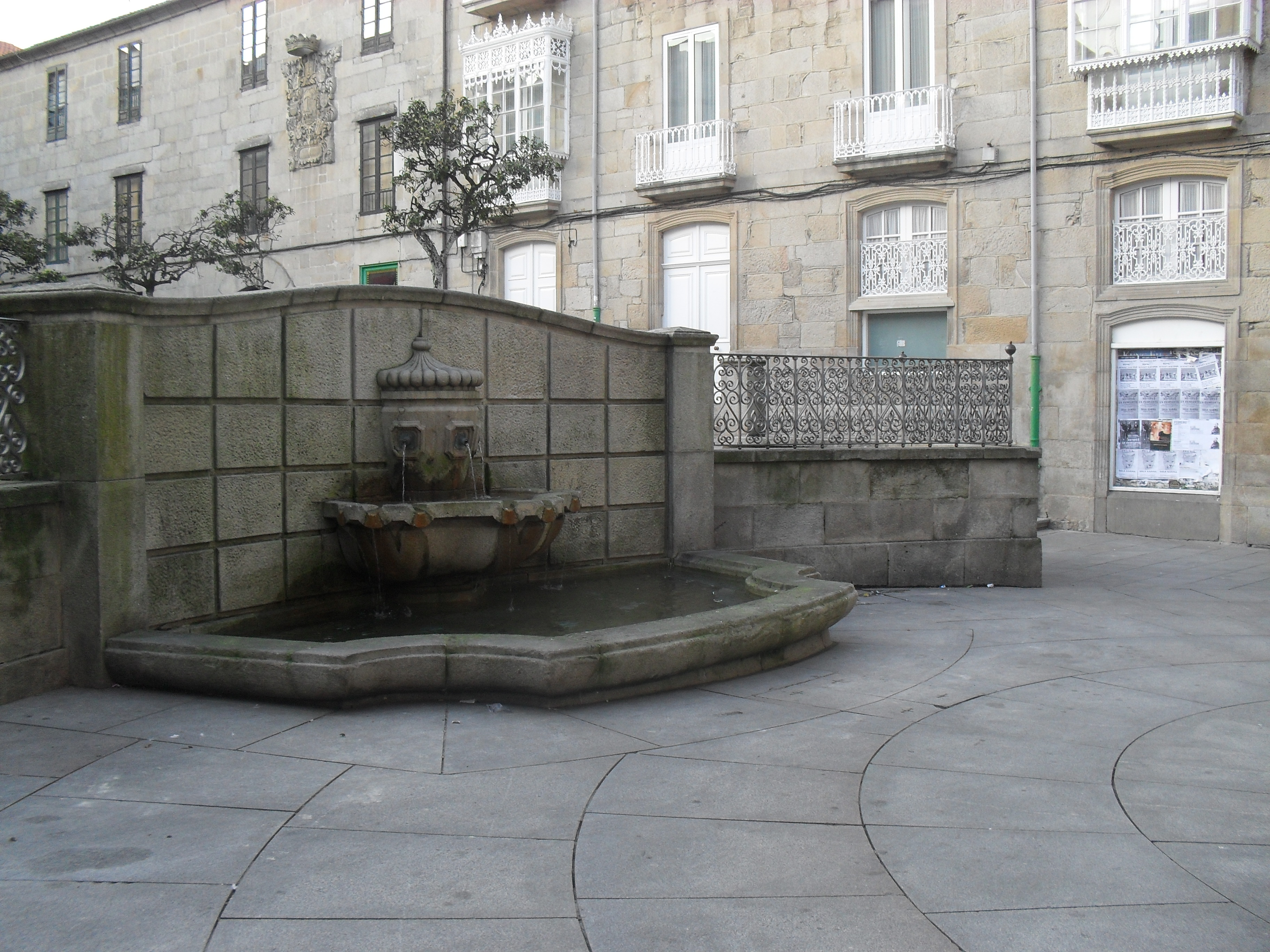
Stone fountain

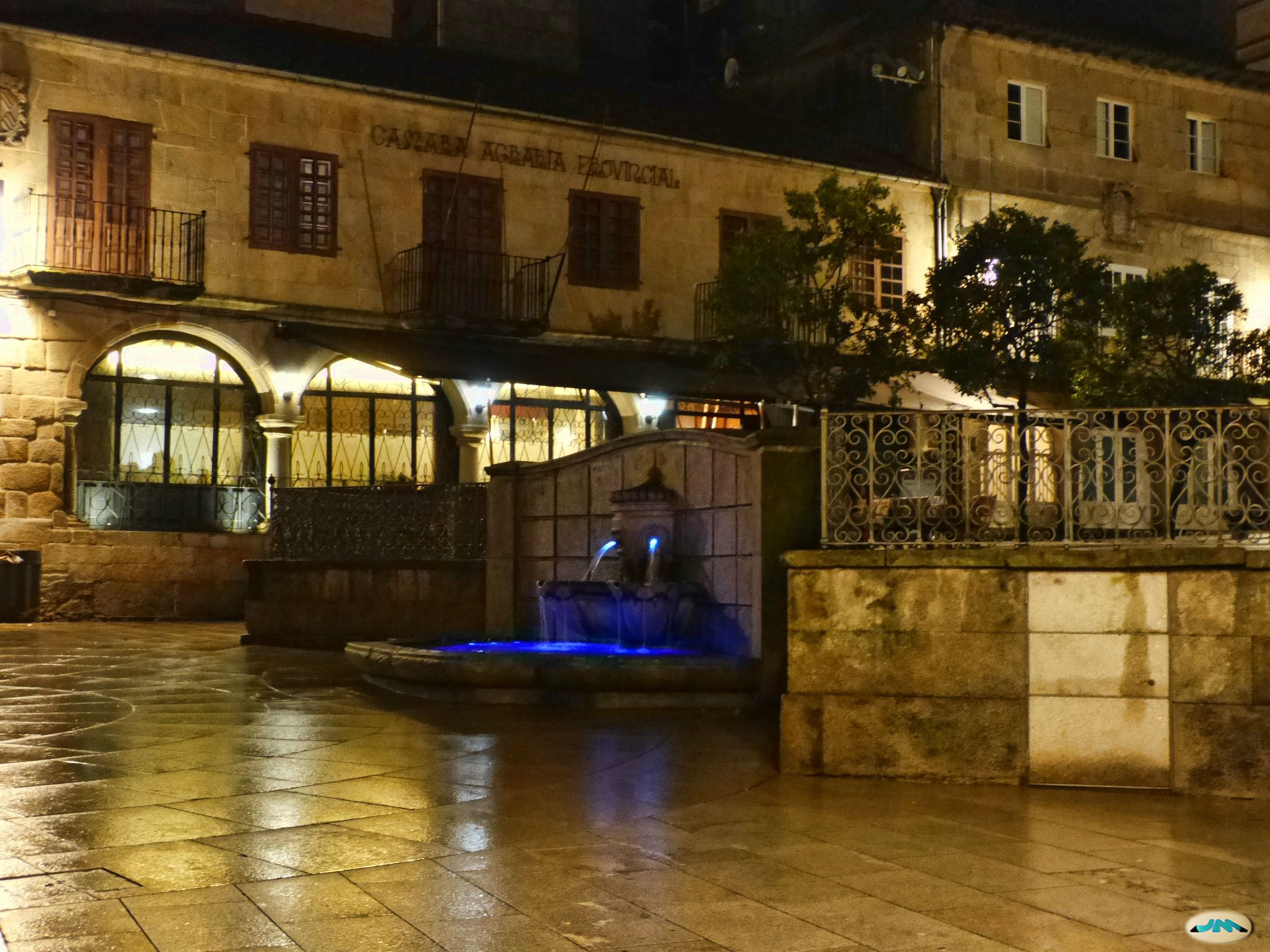
Pazo of the Counts of San Román

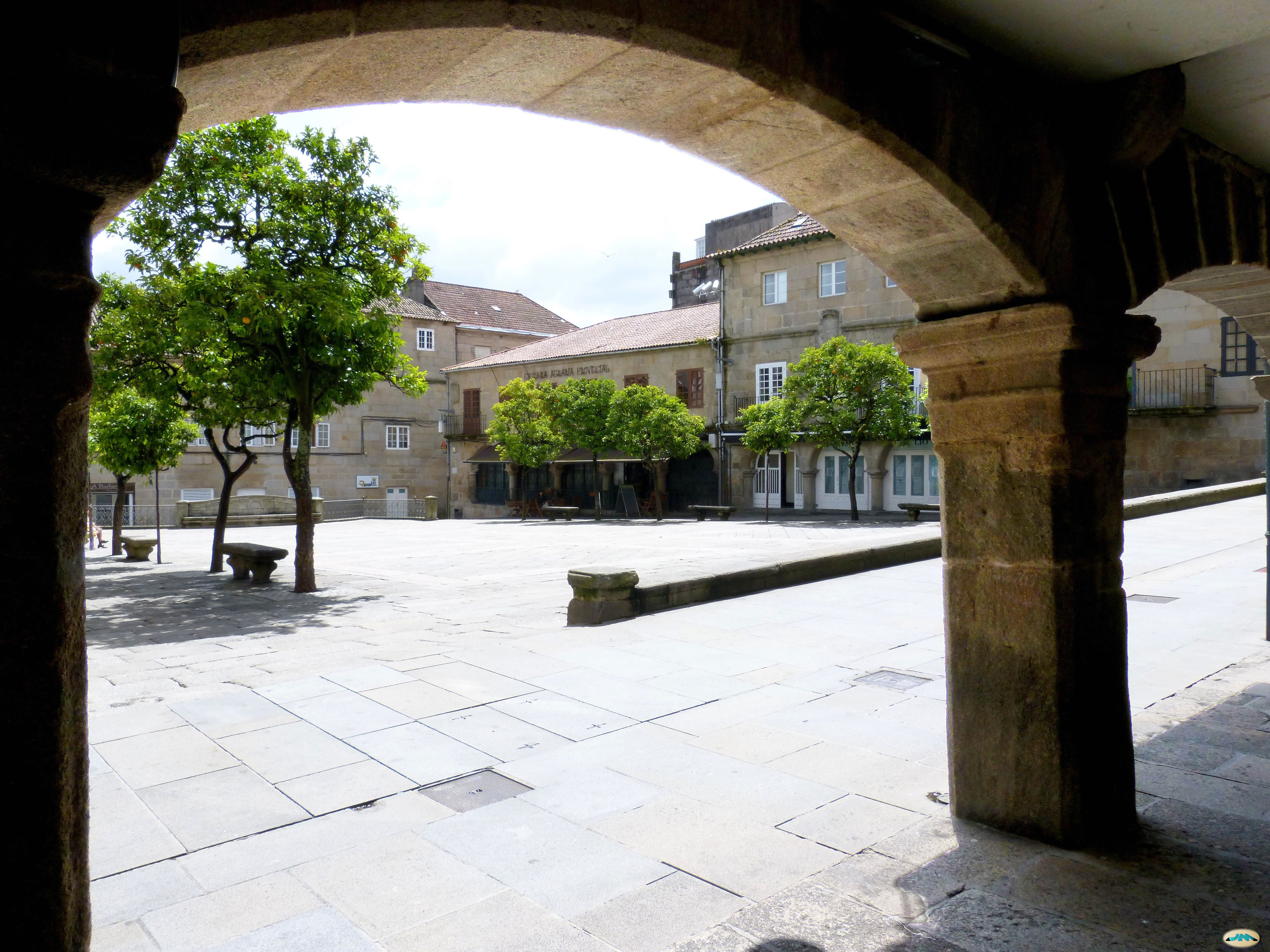
West side arcades

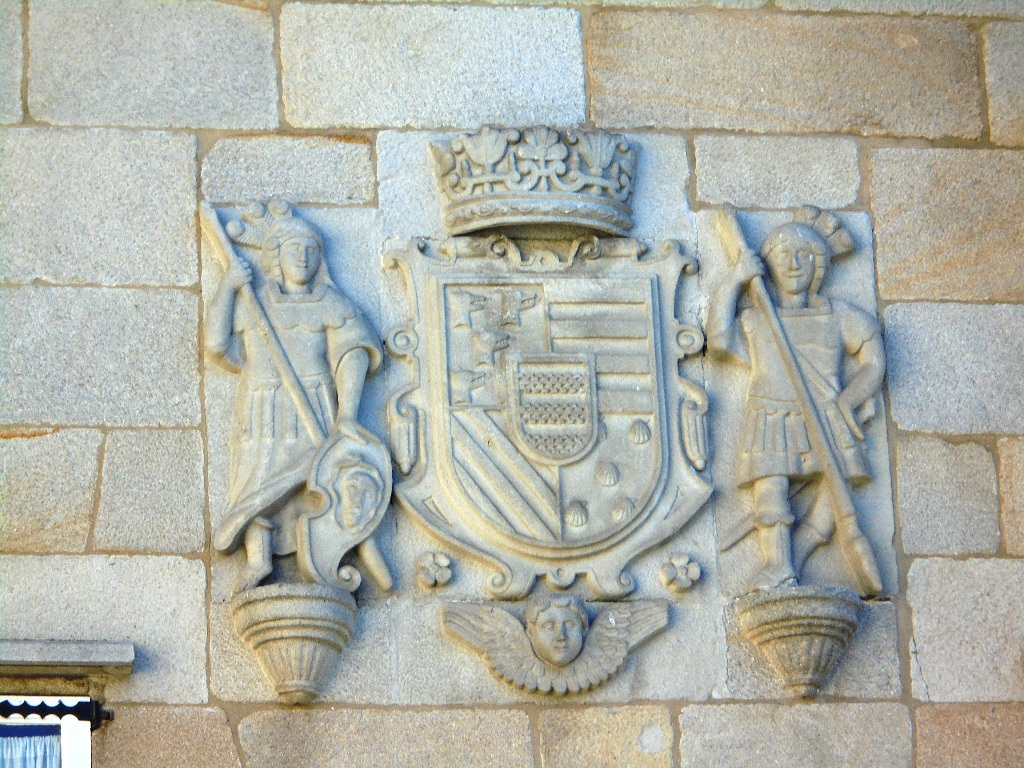
Coat of arms of the Pazo of the Marquis of Aranda

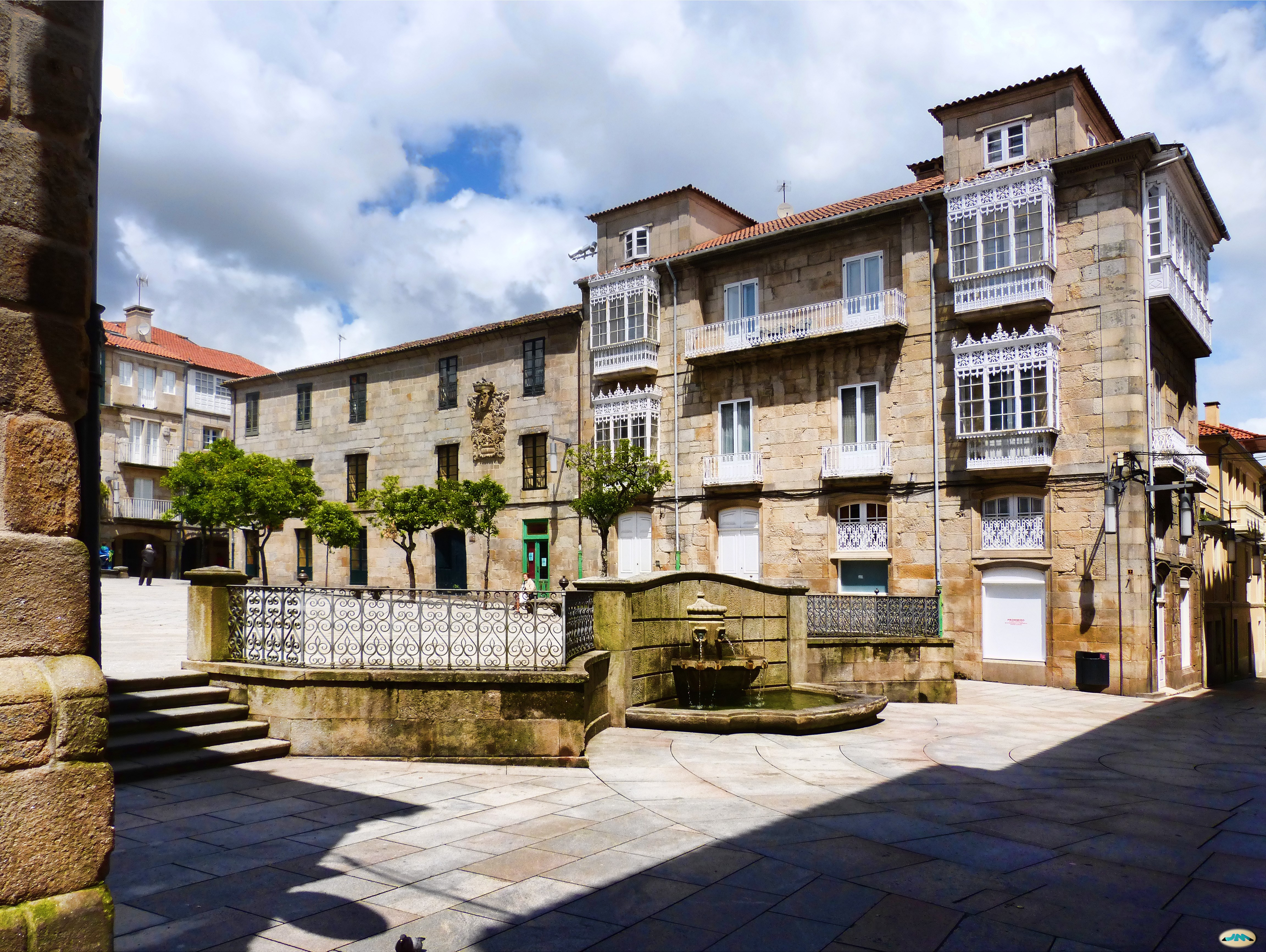
Stairs on the east side of the square

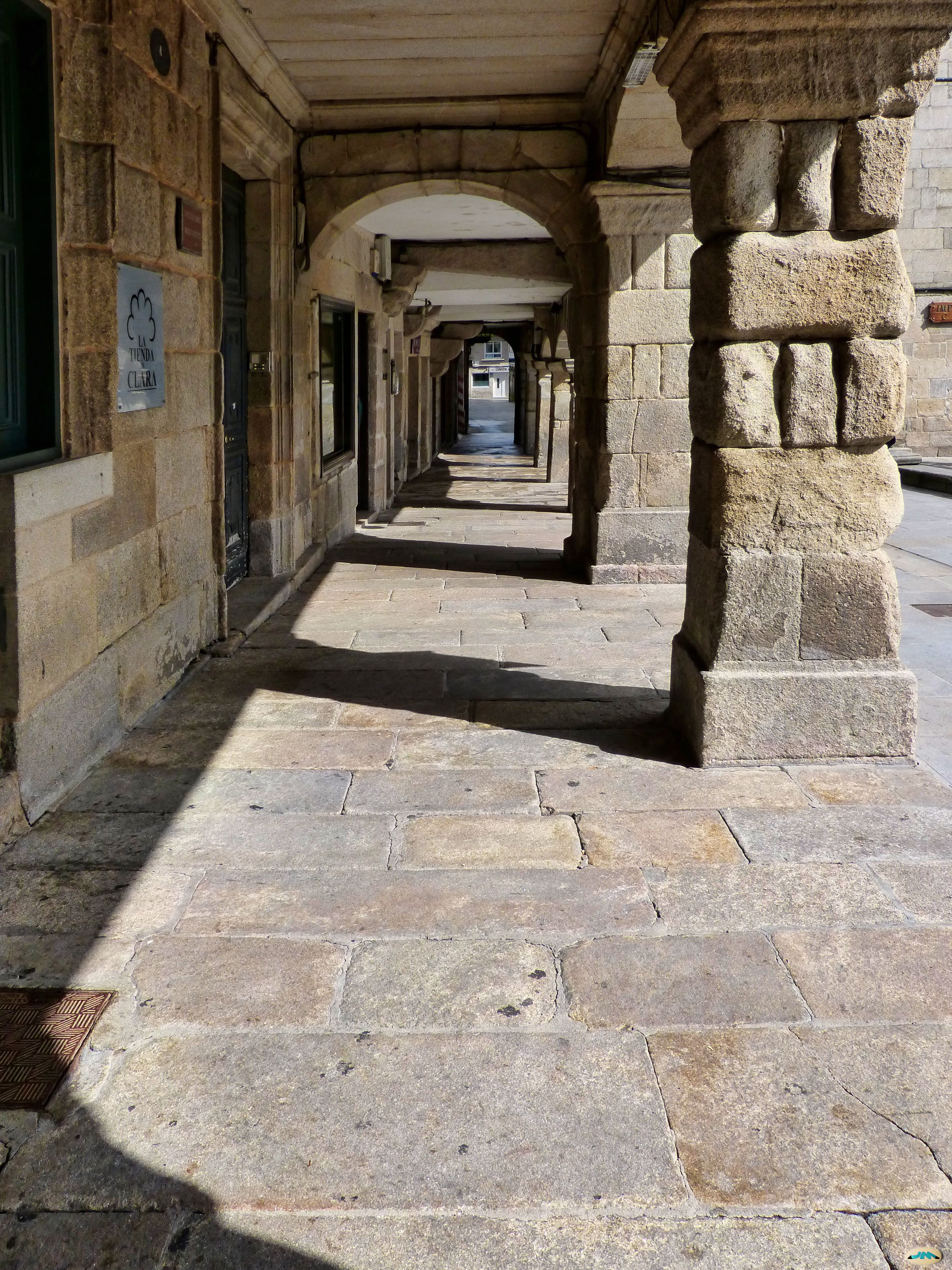
Arcades

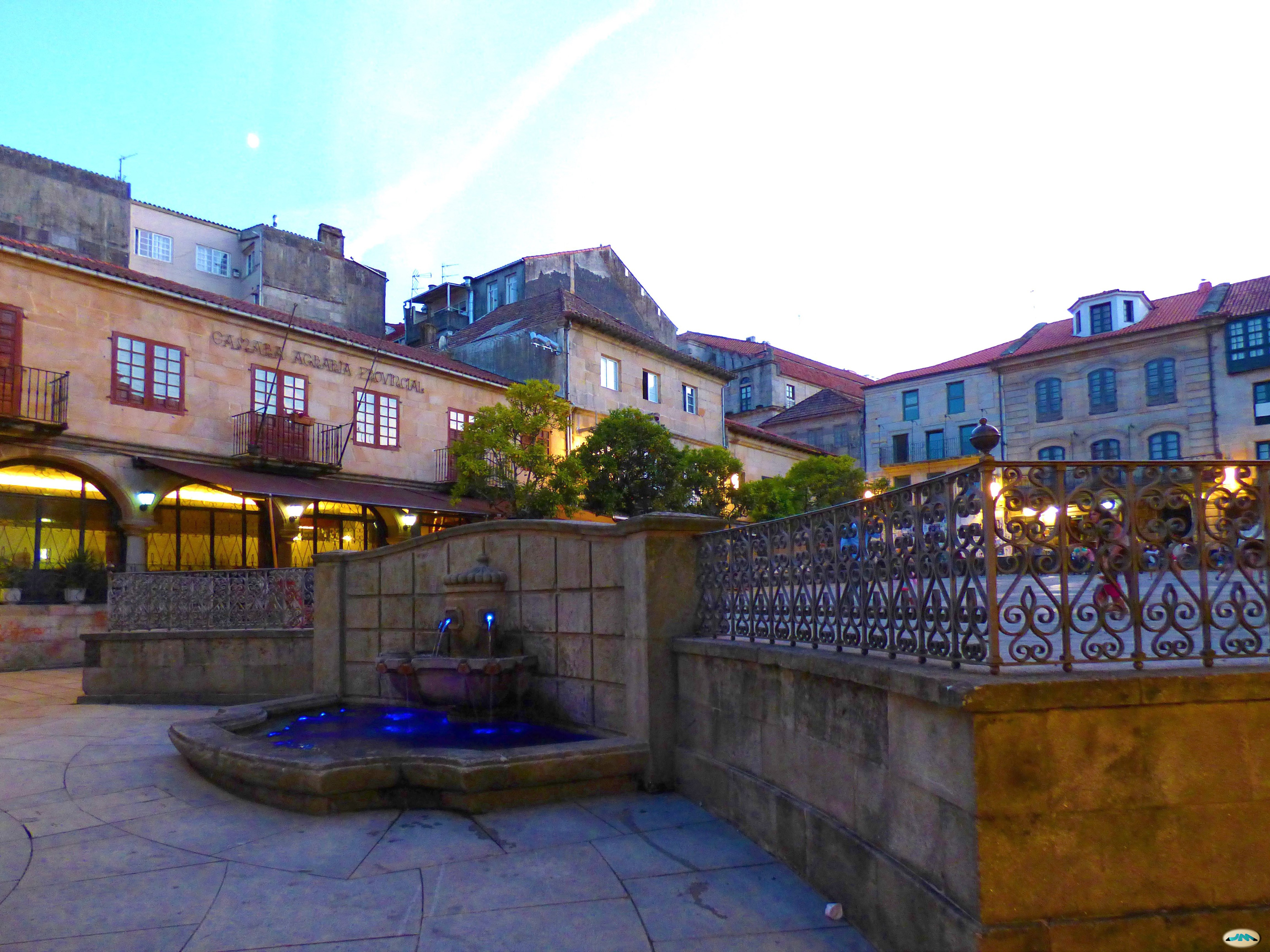
Fountain

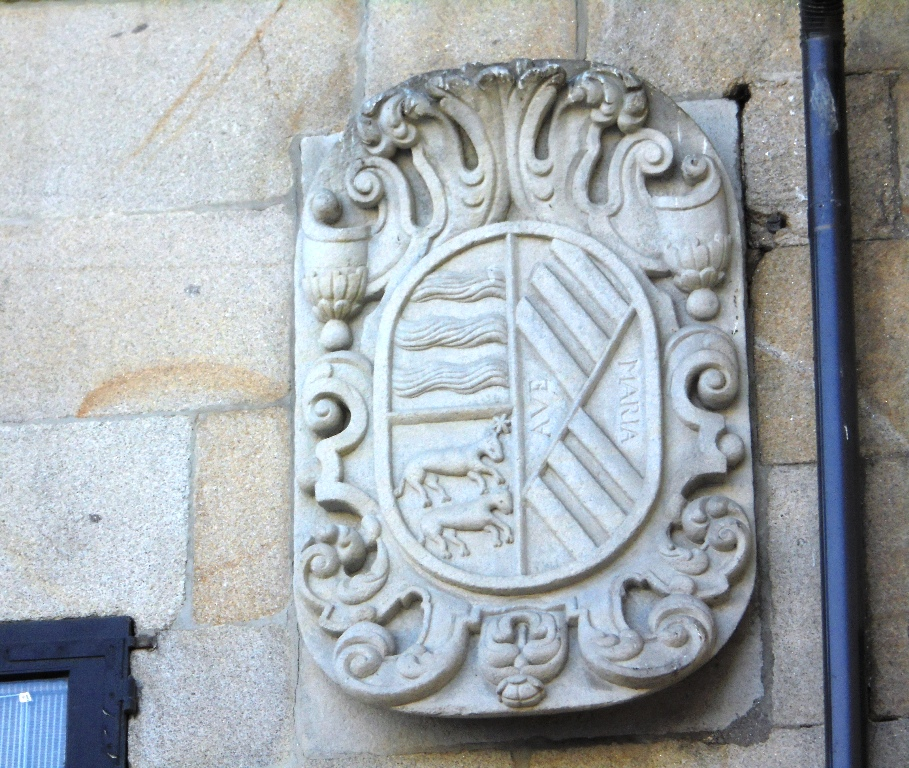
Coat of arms next to the Pazo of the Counts of San Román

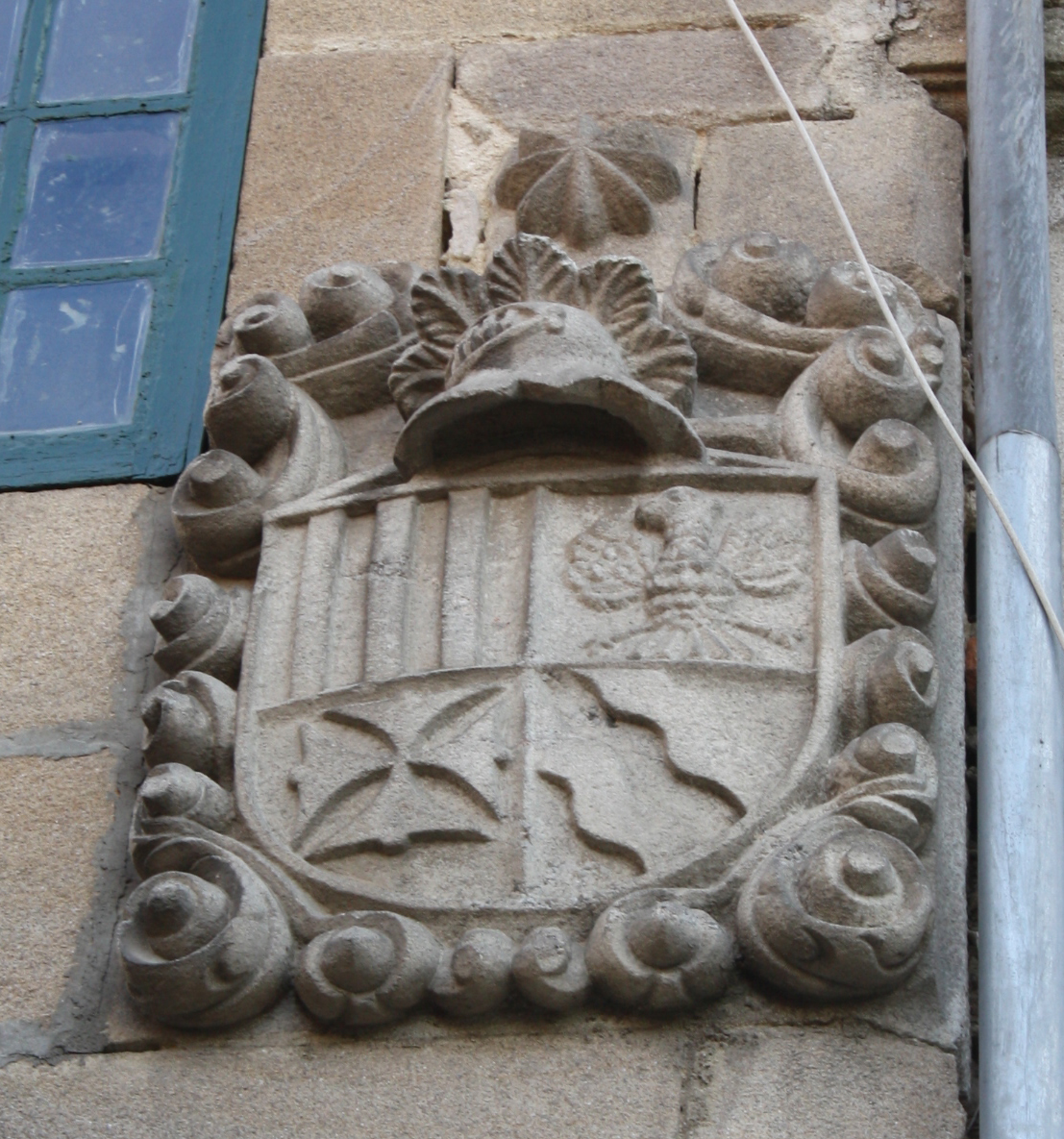
Coat of arms in the square

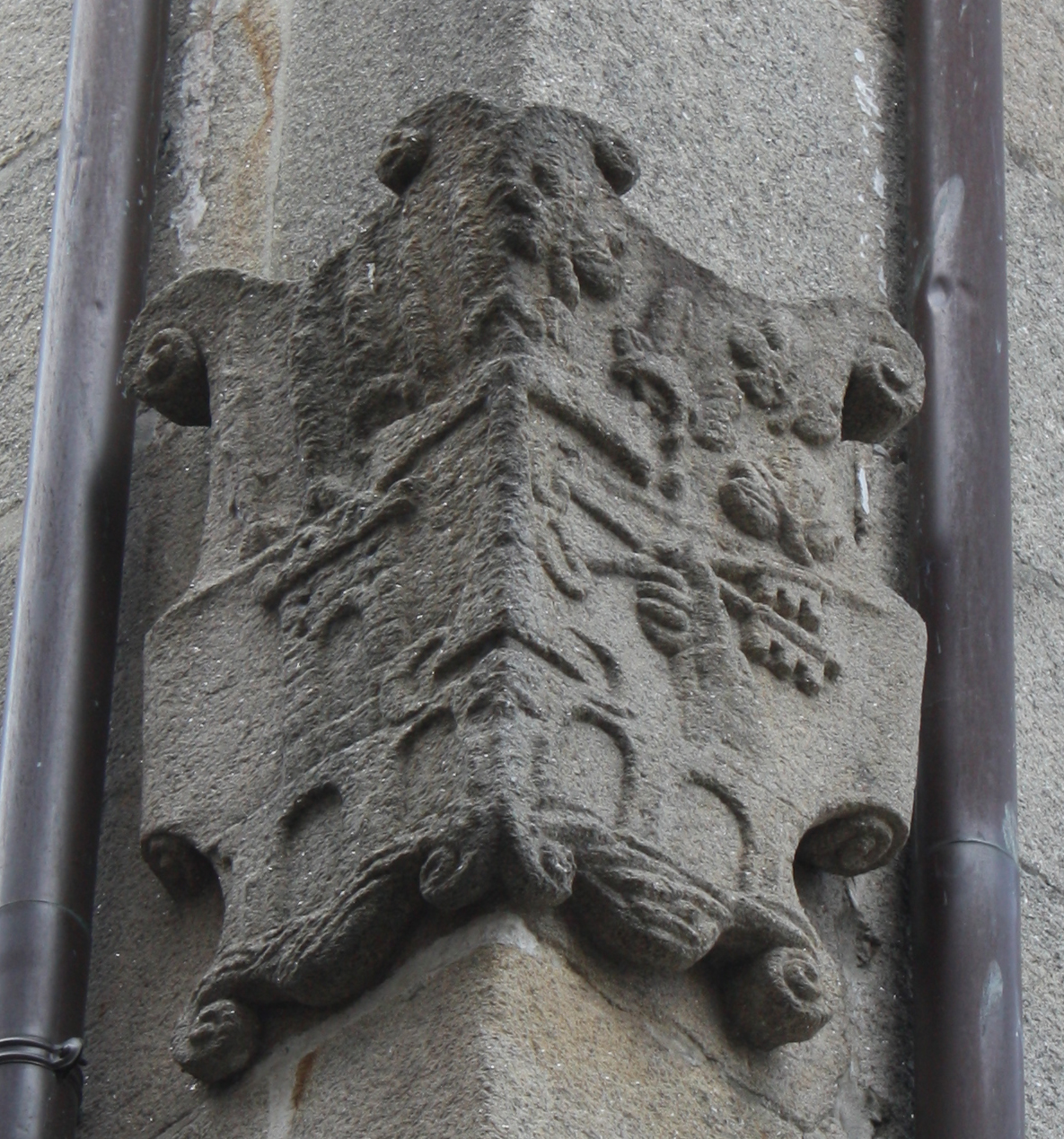
Another coat of arms in the square

== See also ==
=== Bibliography ===
- Aganzo, Carlos (2010): Pontevedra. Ciudades con encanto. El País Aguilar. ISBN 8403509340. p. 67-69.
- Fernández Martínez, Carla (2016). Pontevedra. La memoria rescatada: Vistas y visiones de una ciudad atlántica. Diputación de Pontevedra. ISBN 8484574407.
- Fontoira Surís, Rafael (2009). Pontevedra Monumental (in Galician). Pontevedra: Diputación de Pontevedra. ISBN 9788484573272.
- Fontoira Surís, Rafael (2009). A praza do Pan (in Galician). Pontevedra: A Nosa Terra. ISBN 978-84-8341-380-7.
- García-Braña, C. et al. (1988): Pontevedra, planteamiento histórico y urbanístico, Deputación Provincial de Pontevedra, Servizo de Publicacións, Pontevedra
- Juega Puig, J. et al. (1996): Historia de Pontevedra. Via Láctea, A Coruña.
- Juega Puig, J. (2000): As ruas de Pontevedra. Deputación Provincial de Pontevedra, Servizo de Publicacións, Pontevedra
- Nieto González, Remigio (1980) : Guía monumental ilustrada de Pontevedra. Asociación de Comerciantes de la Calle Manuel Quiroga, Pontevedra. p. 28-30.
- Riveiro Tobío, E. (2008): Descubrir Pontevedra. Edicións do Cumio, Pontevedra. p. 42-44. ISBN 8482890859

=== Related articles ===
- Old town of Pontevedra

=== External links ===
- on the website Xunta de Galicia Tourism
- on the website Rias Baixas Tourism
- Pontevedra iconografía de una ciudad atlántica on the website of Santiago de Compostela University.
- on the website Terras de Pontevedra.
- on the website Visit Pontevedra.
