= Estadio Luis Tróccoli =

Uruguayan sports venue

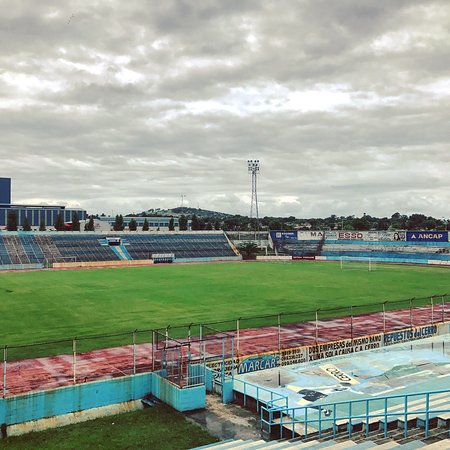
- Interactive map of Estadio Luis Tróccoli
- Address: Uruguay
- Location: Montevideo, Uruguay
- Coordinates: 34.867386°S 56.251969°W
- Capacity: 25,000
- Surface: grass

Construction
- Opened: August 22, 1964
- Renovated: 2010

Tenant
- CA Cerro

Estadio Luis Tróccoli is a multi-use stadium in Montevideo, Uruguay. It is currently used primarily for football matches and is the home of CA Cerro. The stadium holds 25,000 spectators and was built in 1964.

== Installations ==
The outside of the stadium features a mural painted by Uruguayan artist Leopoldo Nóvoa Garcia. The painting was so impressive that Nóvoa Garcia was invited to move to Paris to continue working on his art.
