= Liceo Casino =

Neoclassical building in Pontevedra, Spain

- Liceo Casino de Pontevedra
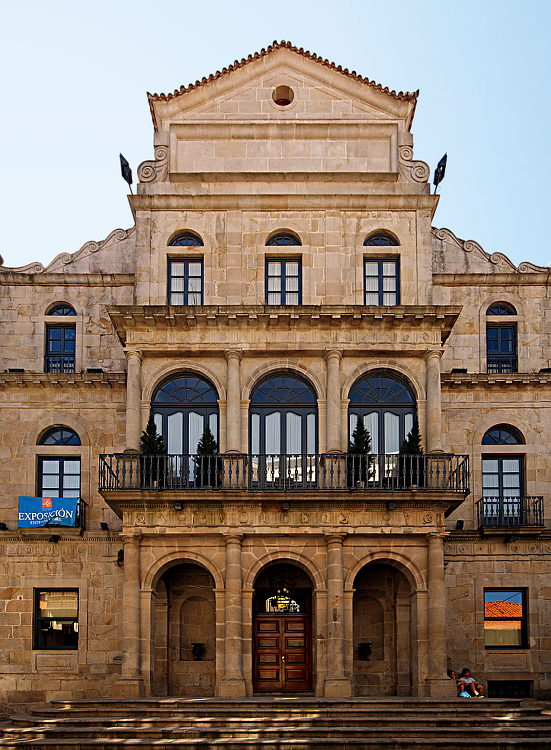
- Façade of the Liceo Casino
- Interactive map of the Liceo Casino area

General information
- Location: Pontevedra, Galicia, Spain
- Coordinates: 42°25′56.7″N 8°38′45.1″W
- Construction started: 1864
- Completed: 1878
- Opening: 2 August 1878
- Owner: Liceo Casino de Pontevedra Society

Technical details
- Floor count: 3

Design and construction
- Architects: Domingo Lareo and Enrique Barreiro Álvarez (interior reconstruction)

Website
- www.casinopontevedra.com

The Liceo Casino is a neoclassical building from 1878 located in the historic centre of Pontevedra, which houses the oldest cultural and leisure society in Pontevedra, Spain.

== Location ==
The Liceo Casino is located in the same block as the Principal Theatre of Pontevedra, being adjacent to it. Its main façade faces Manuel Quiroga street and its side façades overlook Don Filiberto and Duque de Tetuán streets.

== History ==
The Liceo Casino de Pontevedra was founded on 25 February 1855. At the beginning, its activities took place in a building in the Teucer Square belonging to the García Feijóo family and the music and dance sessions were held in the old theatre in Isabel II Street. The lack of space and the growth of its cultural projects led to its move to the Pazo of the Count of San Román, in the same square, on 2 June 1858.

On 23 May 1864, the construction of a new building, designed to be the Liceo Theatre, began in the old Tetuán square and on the site of the old church of San Bartolomé el Viejo, where a new theatre (the present-day Principal Theatre) belonging to the Liceo Casino Company was also built. The building was designed by the architect Domingo Lareo and part of the stones of the old Tower of the Churruchaos, demolished in 1873, were used for its construction. It was inaugurated on 2 August 1878.

In 1892 the Liceo Casino lost ownership of the theatre, keeping the building that served as its headquarters, inside which important renovations have been carried out, such as the painting of the coffered room with allegories of the Arts and Letters by Demetrio Durán.

The building was restored by architects Enrique Barreiro Álvarez and Carlos Alvira Dupla after its interior was destroyed by fire on 16 April 1980. It was reopened on 15 June 1983. Since its foundation, the Liceo Casino has been closely linked to the social life of the city.

== Description ==
The neoclassical building is rectangular in shape with three facades and has two floors and a ground floor.

The main façade has a central projecting body preceded by a wide staircase. On the ground and first floors, this body is composed of doors with semicircular arches framed by four Tuscan columns supporting classical entablatures. On the first floor, the doors open onto a balcony.

The top floor has simple windows with semi-circular arches. The central body is topped by a simple triangular pediment with an oculus in the centre. On the frieze above the entrance that runs along the façade, carved in stone next to the letters of the Liceo, are the symbols of the arts, which testify to the institution's close ties with the cultural world. On the side façades, the balcony doors with semicircular arches above them and the symmetry of the many balconies along the façades are remarkable on the first floor.

== Culture ==
On the occasion of the patron saint's day of the Pilgrim Virgin of Pontevedra, the Liceo Casino organises a gala dinner-dance in its park in A Caeira every year in August.

== Gallery ==
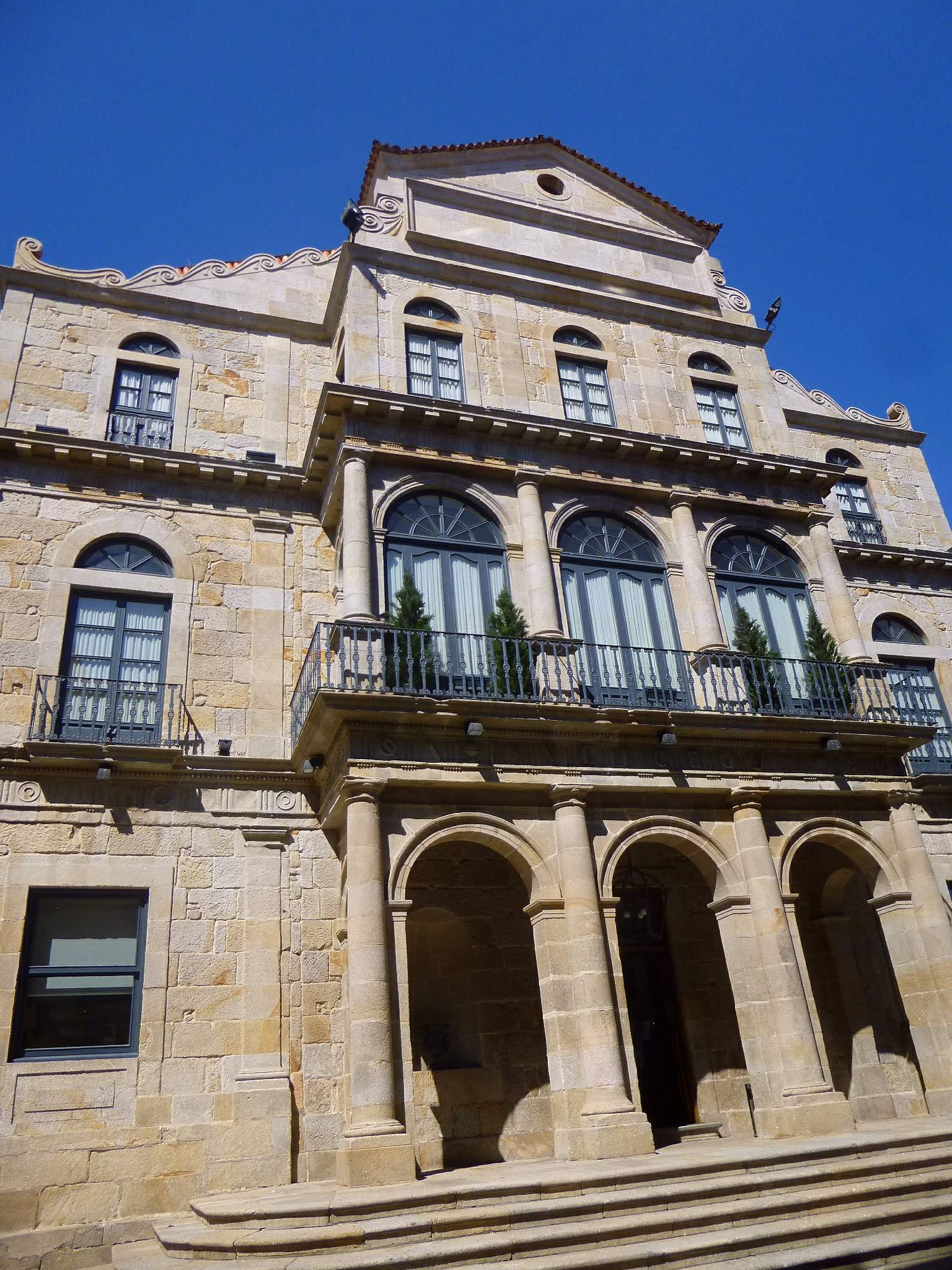

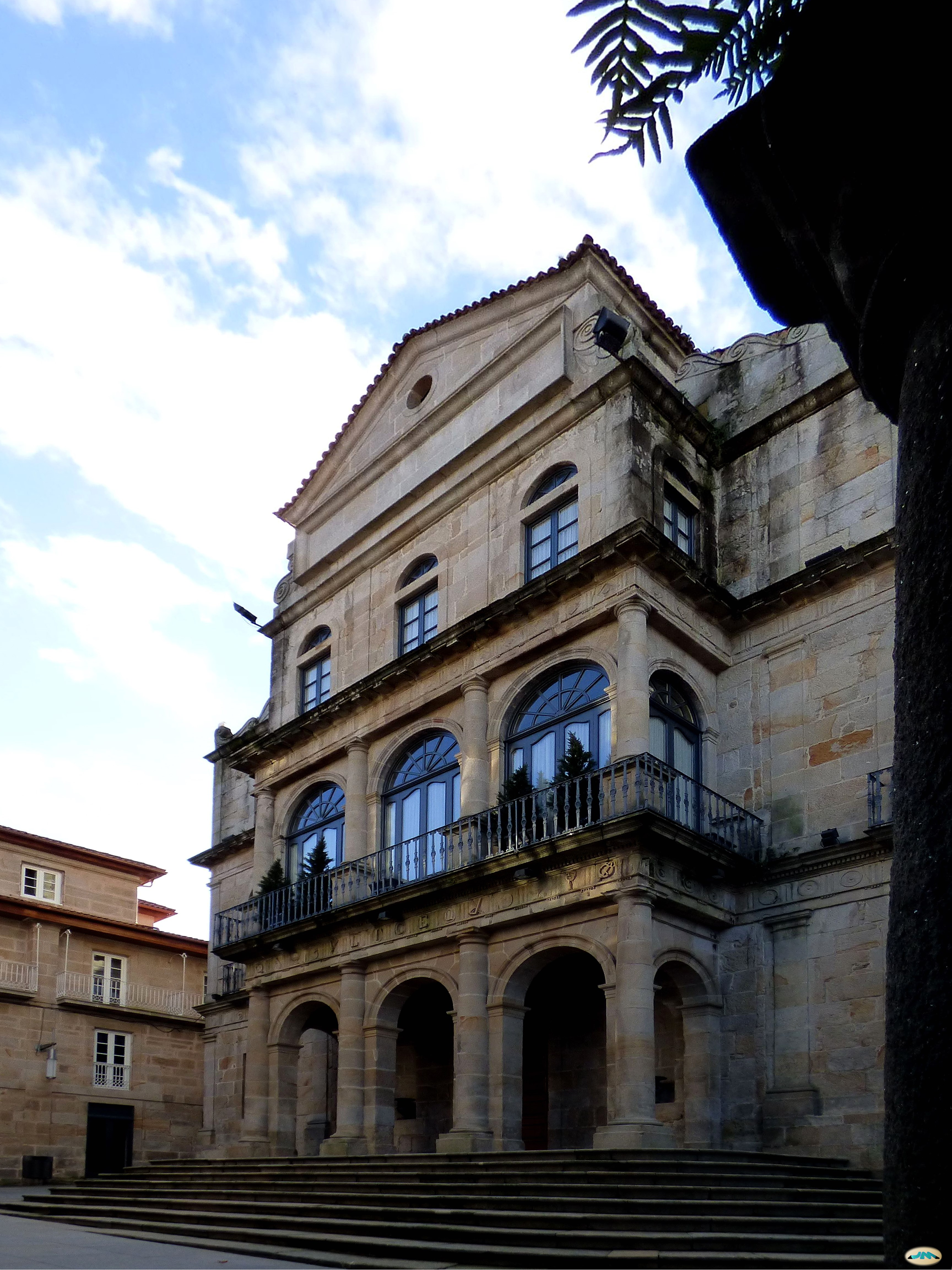

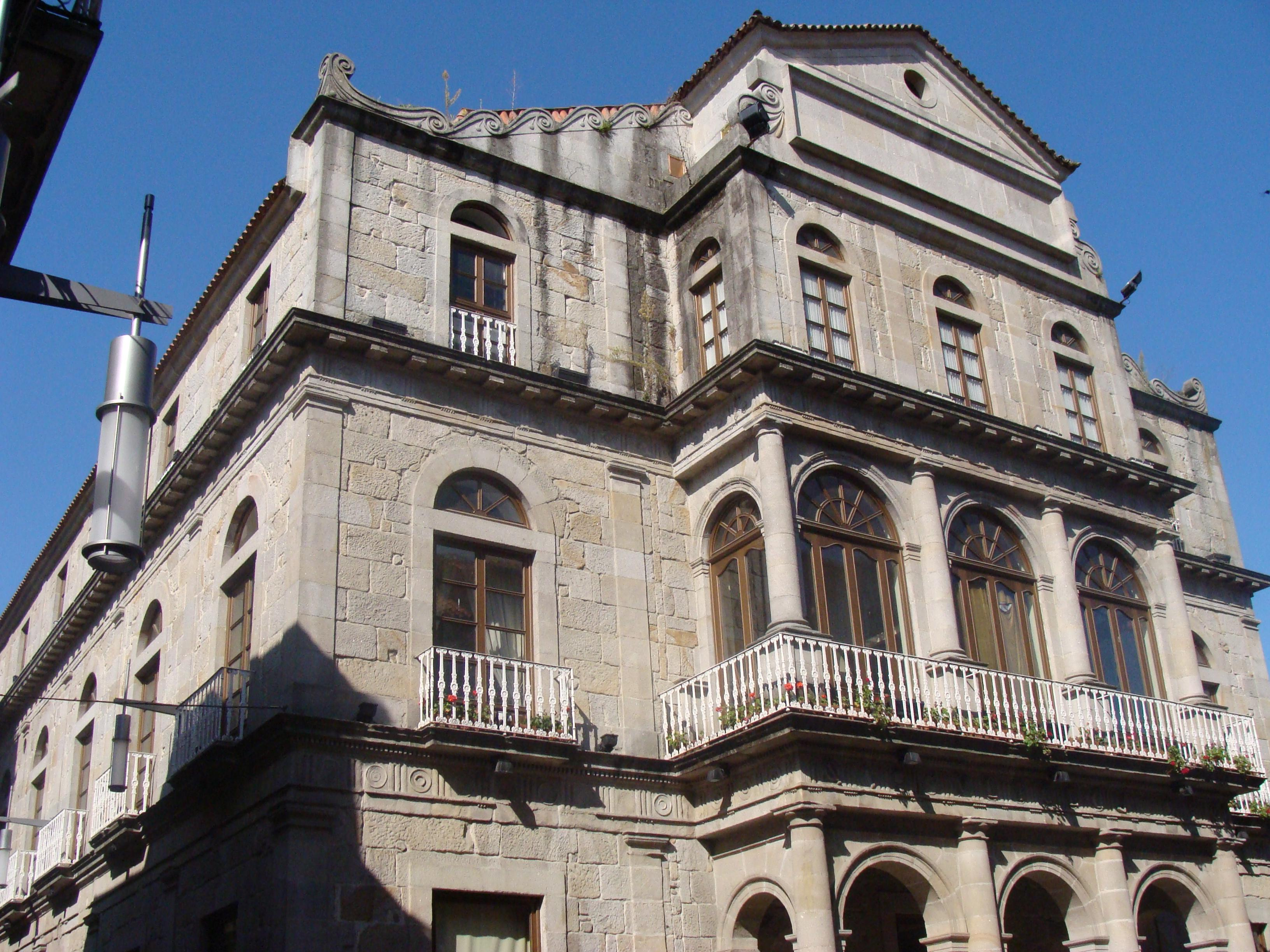

== See also ==
- Principal Theatre of Pontevedra

== Bibliography ==
- Aganzo, Carlos (2010). Pontevedra. Ciudades con encanto (in Spanish). Madrid: El País-Aguilar. pp. 69–70. ISBN 978-8403509344.
- Fontoira Surís, Rafael (2009). Pontevedra monumental (in Galician). Pontevedra: Diputación de Pontevedra. p. 411. ISBN 9788484573272.
- Nieto, Remigio (1980). Pontevedra. Guía monumental ilustrada (in Spanish). Pontevedra: Asociación de Comerciantes de la calle Manuel Quiroga. pp. 26–28.
- Riveiro Tobío, Elvira (2008). Descubrir Pontevedra (in Spanish). Pontevedra: Edicións do Cumio. p. 28. ISBN 9788482890852.
