= Principal Theatre (Pontevedra) =

Theatre in Pontevedra, Spain

Teatro Principal de Pontevedra
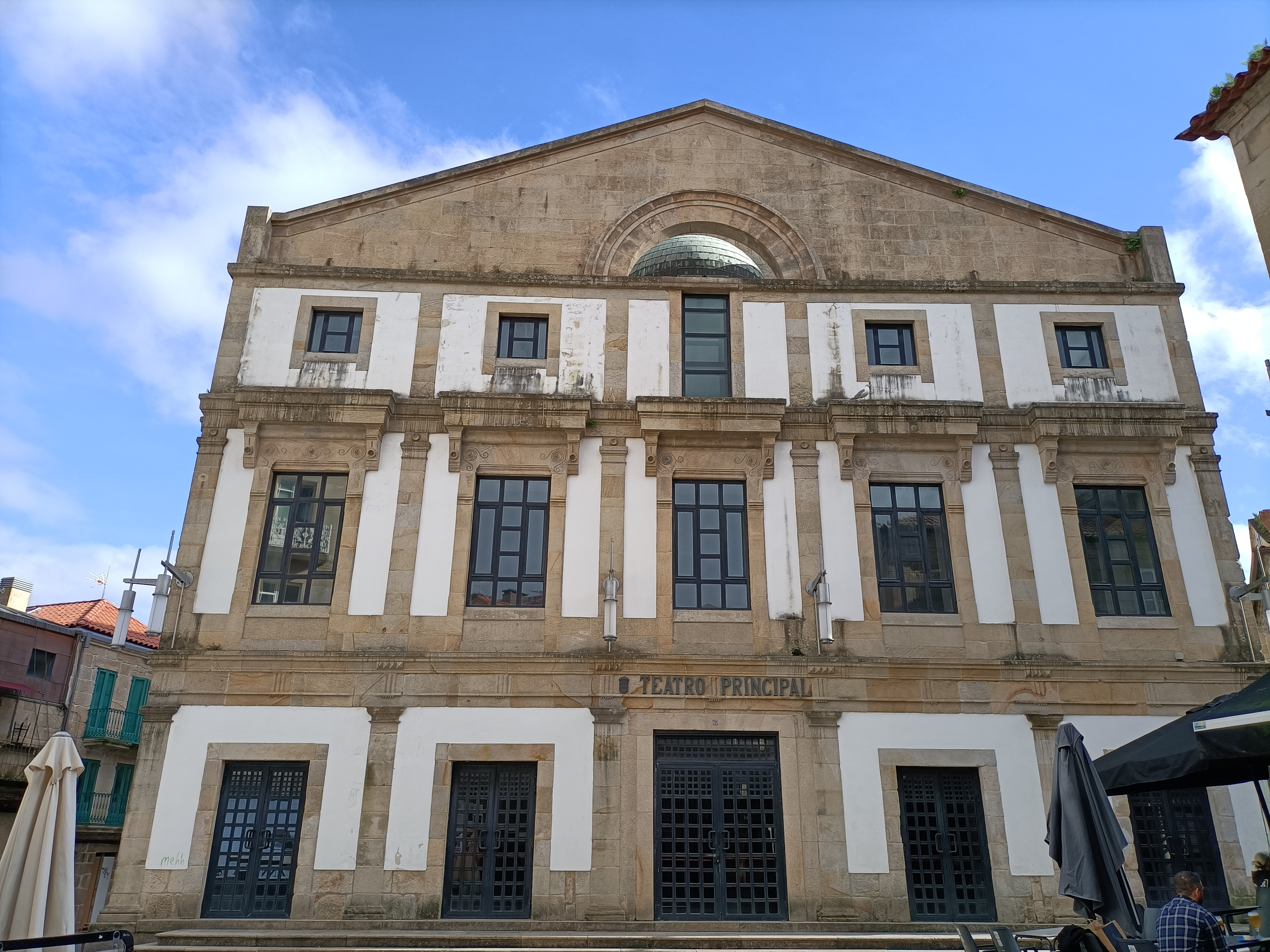
- Principal Theatre façade
- Interactive map of Teatro Principal de Pontevedra
- Address: Paio Gómez Charino Street; Pontevedra; Spain
- Coordinates: 42.432426°N 8.646422°W
- Owner: City Council of Pontevedra
- Capacity: 464

Construction
- Opened: 1878
- Rebuilt: 1987
- Architects: Faustino Flores and José Miyer Caridad (interior reconstruction)

Website
- entradas.ataquilla.com/ventaentradas/es/86__teatro-principal-de-pontevedra

The Principal Theatre of Pontevedra (Teatro Principal de Pontevedra) is a theatre in the old town of Pontevedra (Spain).

== Location ==
The Principal Theatre is located in the same block as the Liceo Casino, being adjacent to it. Its main façade faces Paio Gómez Charino Street and its side façades overlook Don Filiberto and Duque de Tetuán streets.

== History ==
The site of the present Principal Theatre was occupied by the church of St Bartholomew the Elder until the mid-19th century. This late medieval building was in poor condition by the end of the 18th century. In 1769, demolition began, but it was finally demolished in 1844.

After several years as an open square (Tetuán Square), in 1864 a Liceo Casino (work of Domingo Lareu) and the Principal Theatre (work of Faustino Flores), which belonged to the Liceo Casino, were built, inaugurated on 2 August 1878. The theatre was for the exclusive use of members of the Liceo Casino and in fact the entrance to the theatre was through the main façade of the Liceo Casino. The theatre opened with the company of Miguel Cepillo, who performed El esclavo de su culpa by Juan Antonio Cavestany.

Manuel Becerra bought the building at a judicial auction in 1892. In April 1900, this building hosted the first cinema projection in Pontevedra, and in December of the same year, the first phonograph audition. The theatre hosted concerts by renowned artists such as the violinist Manuel Quiroga and the pianist Arthur Rubinstein. In 1942 the theatre became the property of Dolores Vázquez. In the mid-20th century the theatre functioned almost exclusively as a cinema.

On 14 April 1980, a fire destroyed both buildings, although the interior walls and exterior walls remained standing. On 1 July 1983, the plenary session of the municipality of Pontevedra unanimously decided to buy the ruins of the Teatro Principal. On 22 August 1983, the City Council acquired the ruins of the theatre and on 9 January 1984, an invitation to tender was issued for its reconstruction.

The current building, inaugurated on 3 January 1987, is the work of the architect José Miyer Caridad, who won the preliminary design competition.

== Description ==
The façade of the theatre is neoclassical. It has symmetrical windows and doors with granite frames, and those on the first floor have eaves. The main entrance ends in a pediment with a hollow arch inside. In July 2015, the façade of the theatre was restored to the white stone walls with which the building was designed in the 19th century.

The theatre is spread over five floors and two basements, in which it houses two exhibition rooms and an auditorium with a total capacity of 434 seats. Its stage, which occupies 52 square metres, is equipped with a mobile platform.

The interior space has a false ceiling which helps to improve acoustics, as well as hiding the lighting installation. Its decorative style sought to combine the look of 19th century theatres with a more contemporary interior.

== Gallery ==
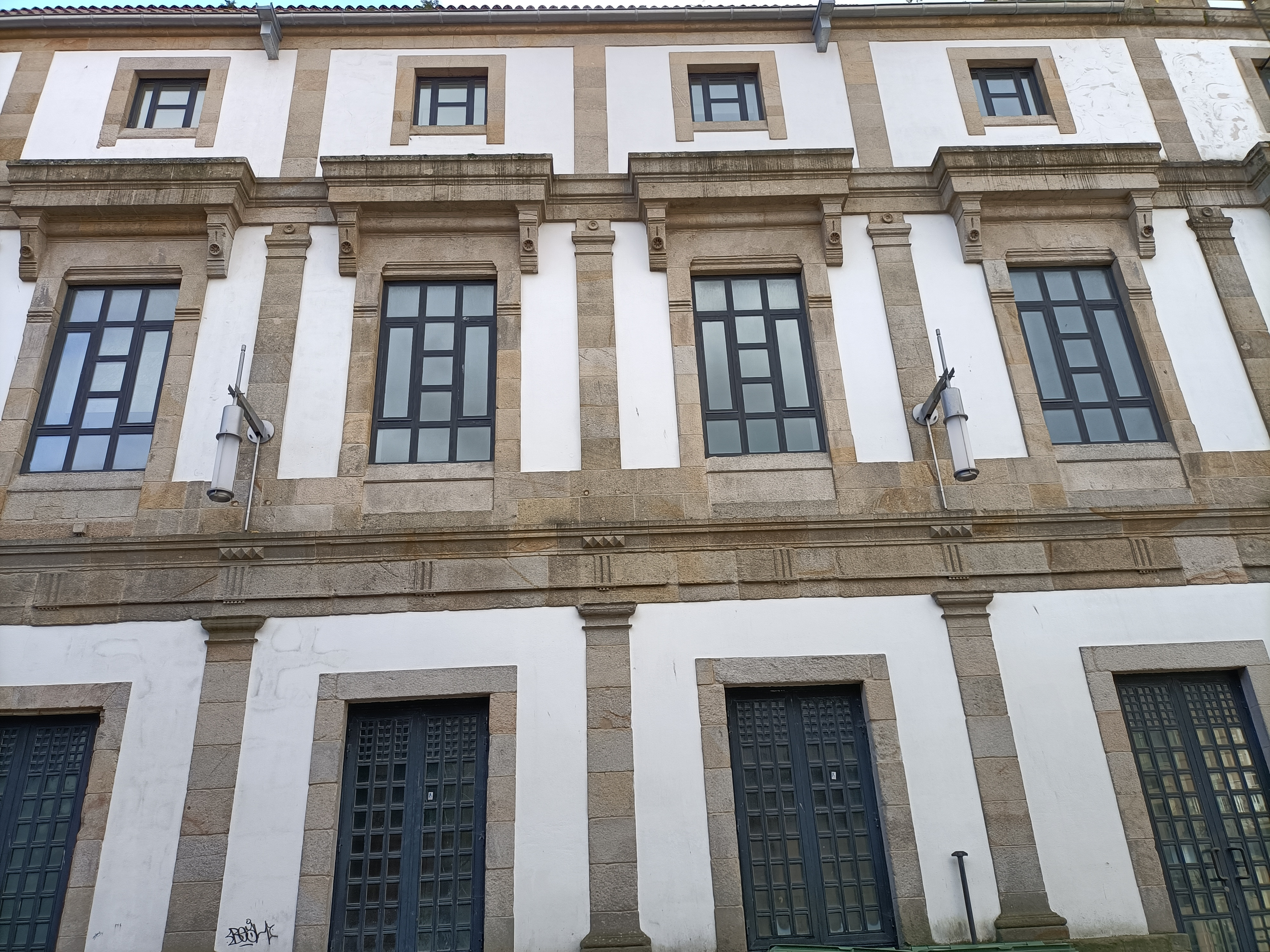
North side façade with its classical pilasters

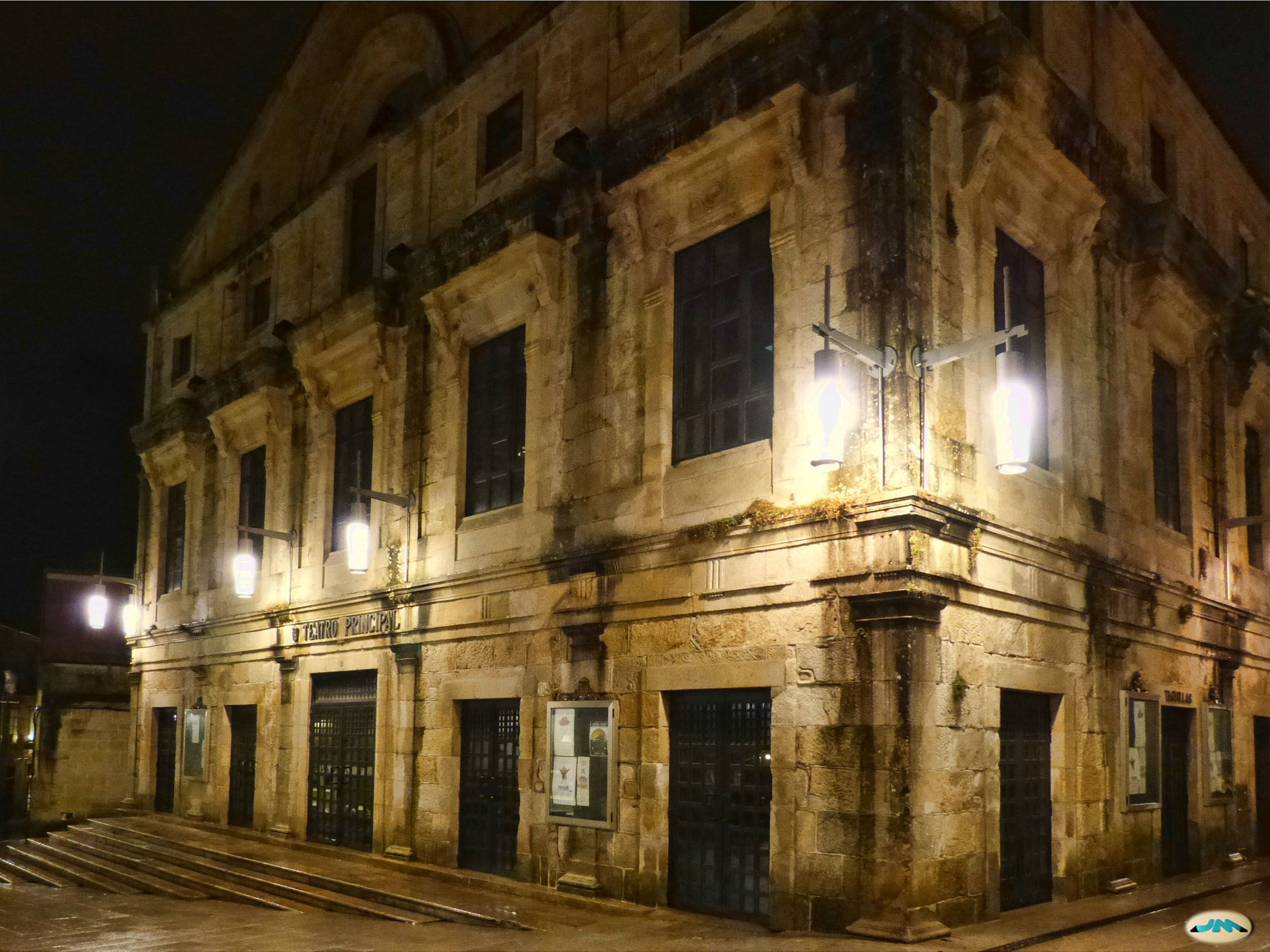
Facade illuminated at night

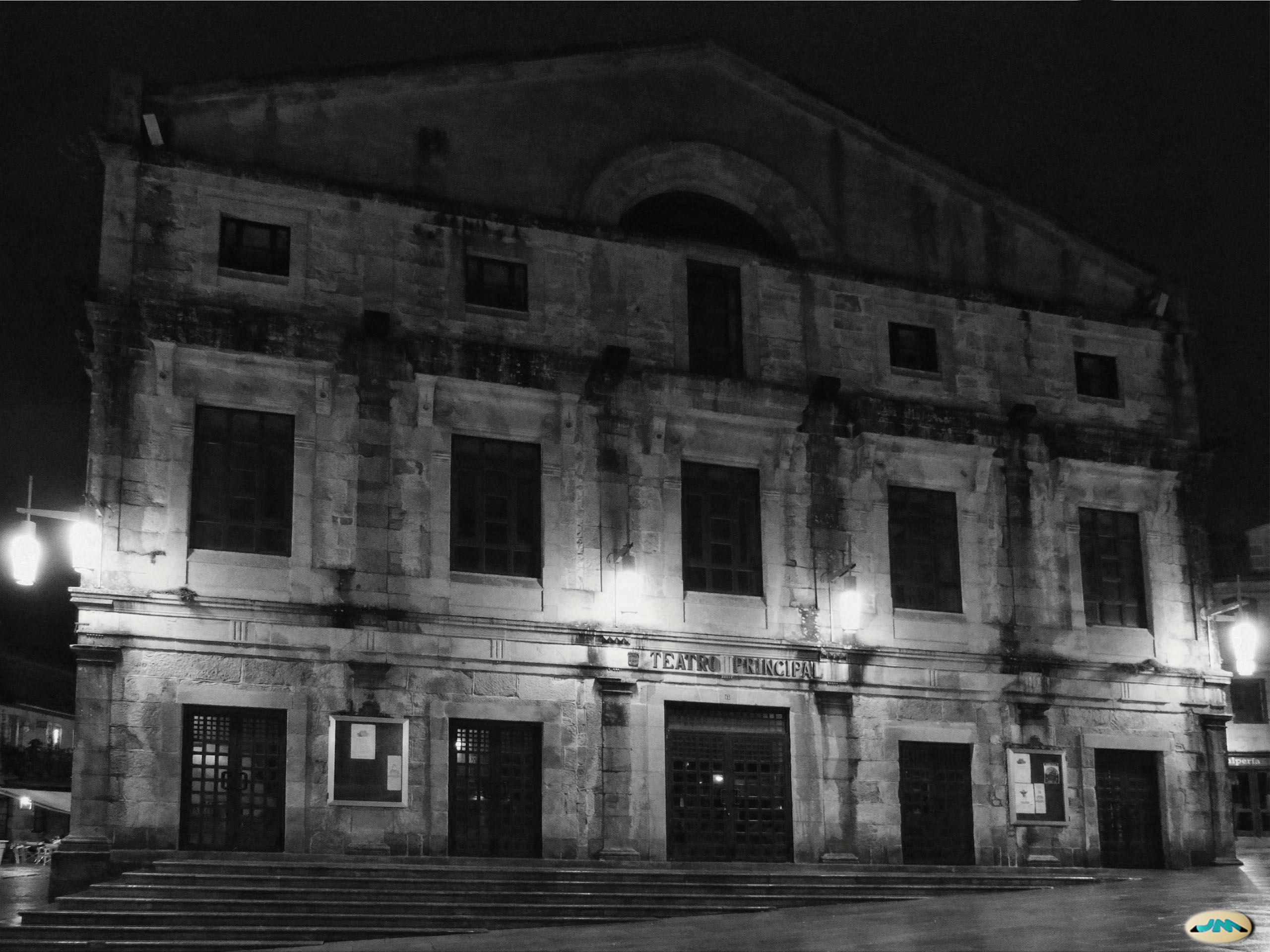
Façade

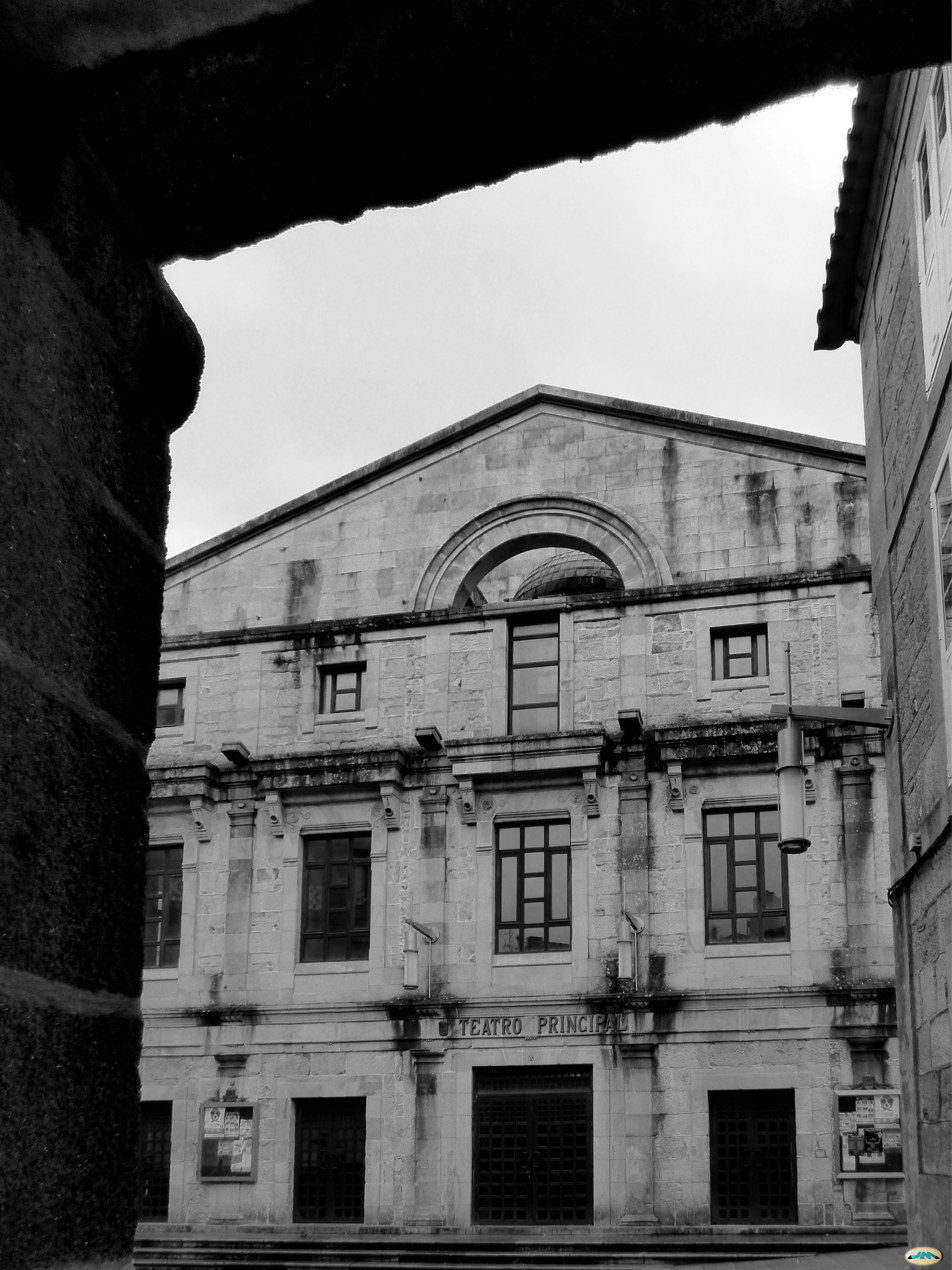
Black and white façade

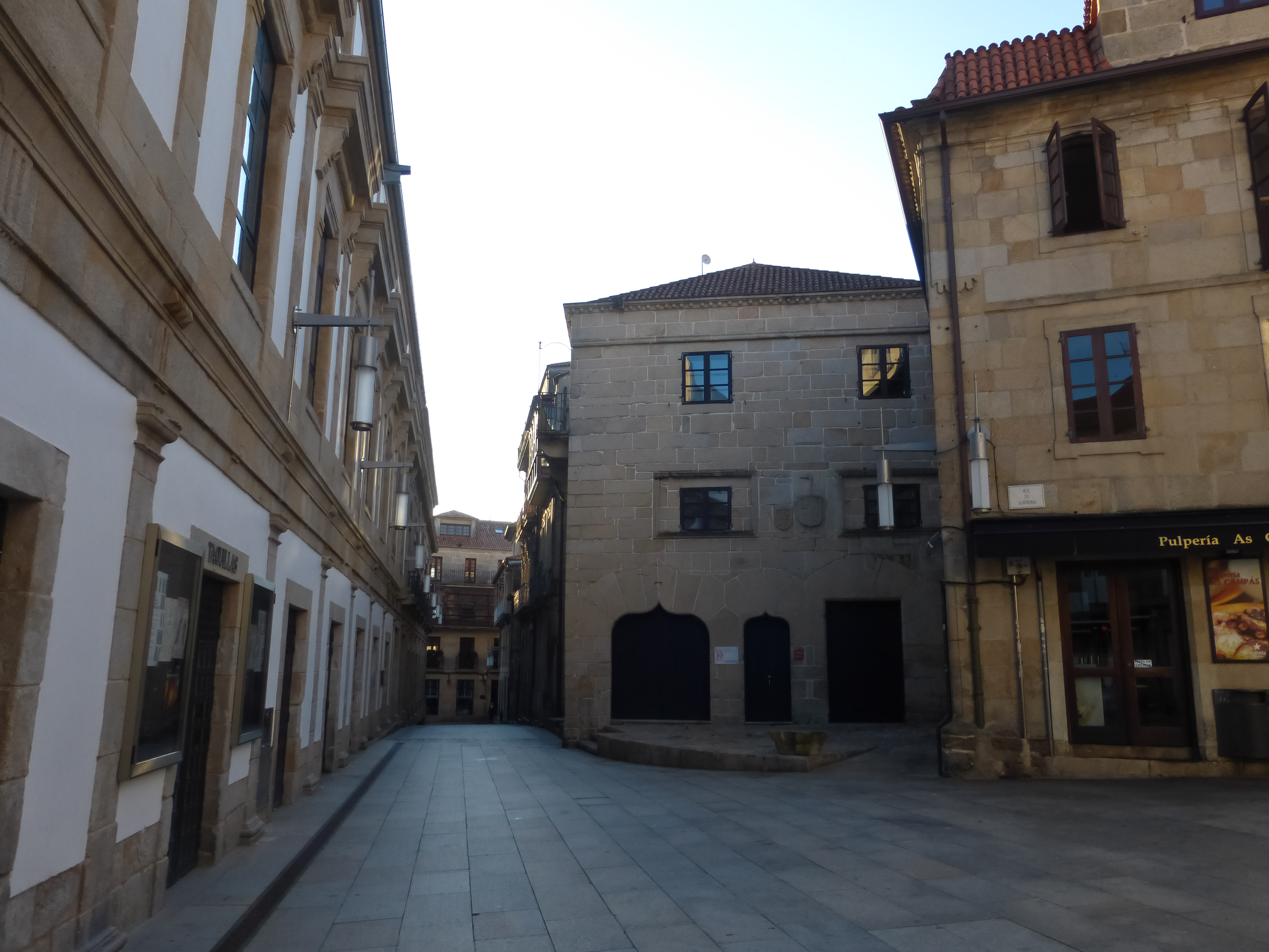
South façade with the ticket office (on the left)

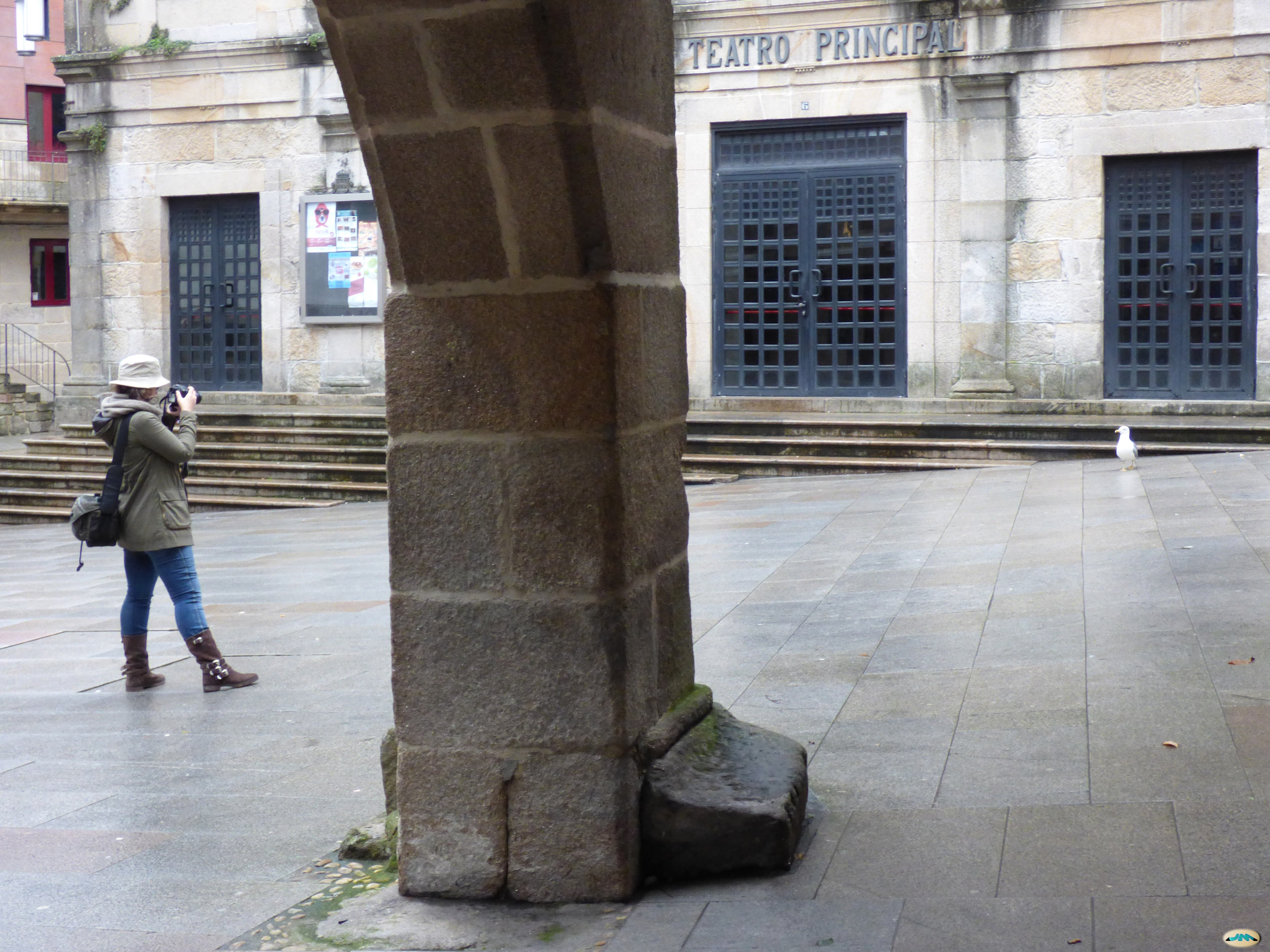
Entrance

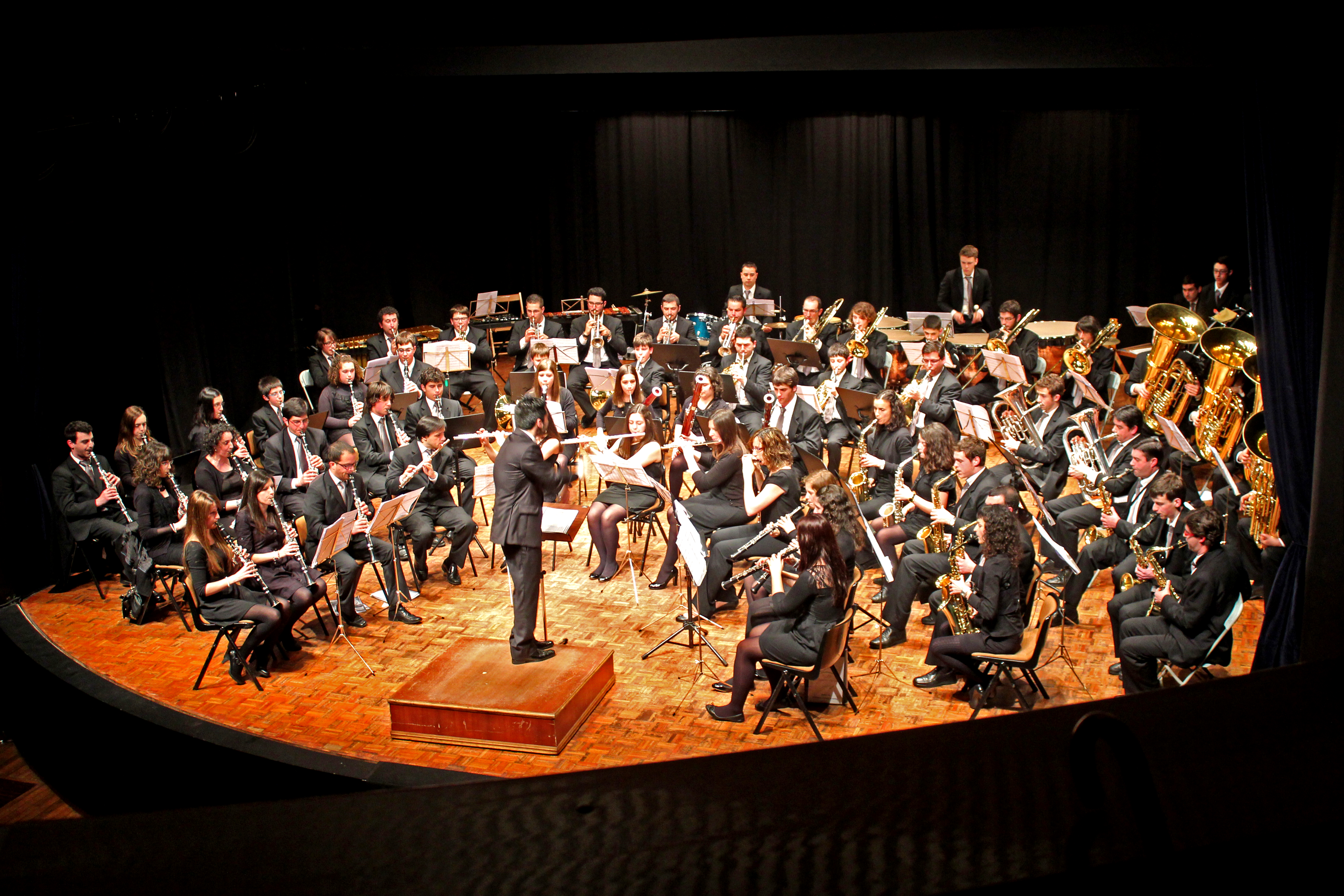
Scene

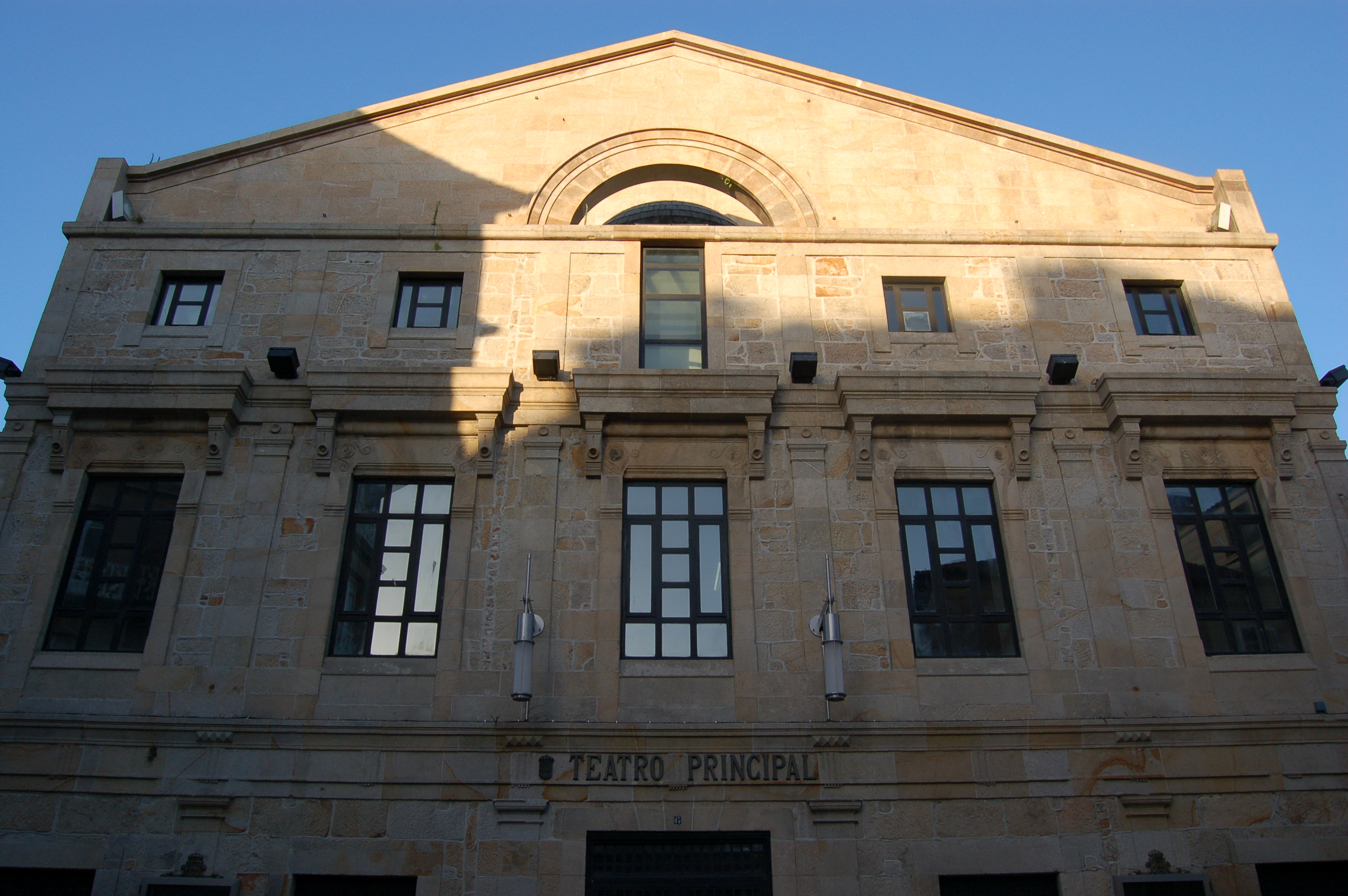
Façade

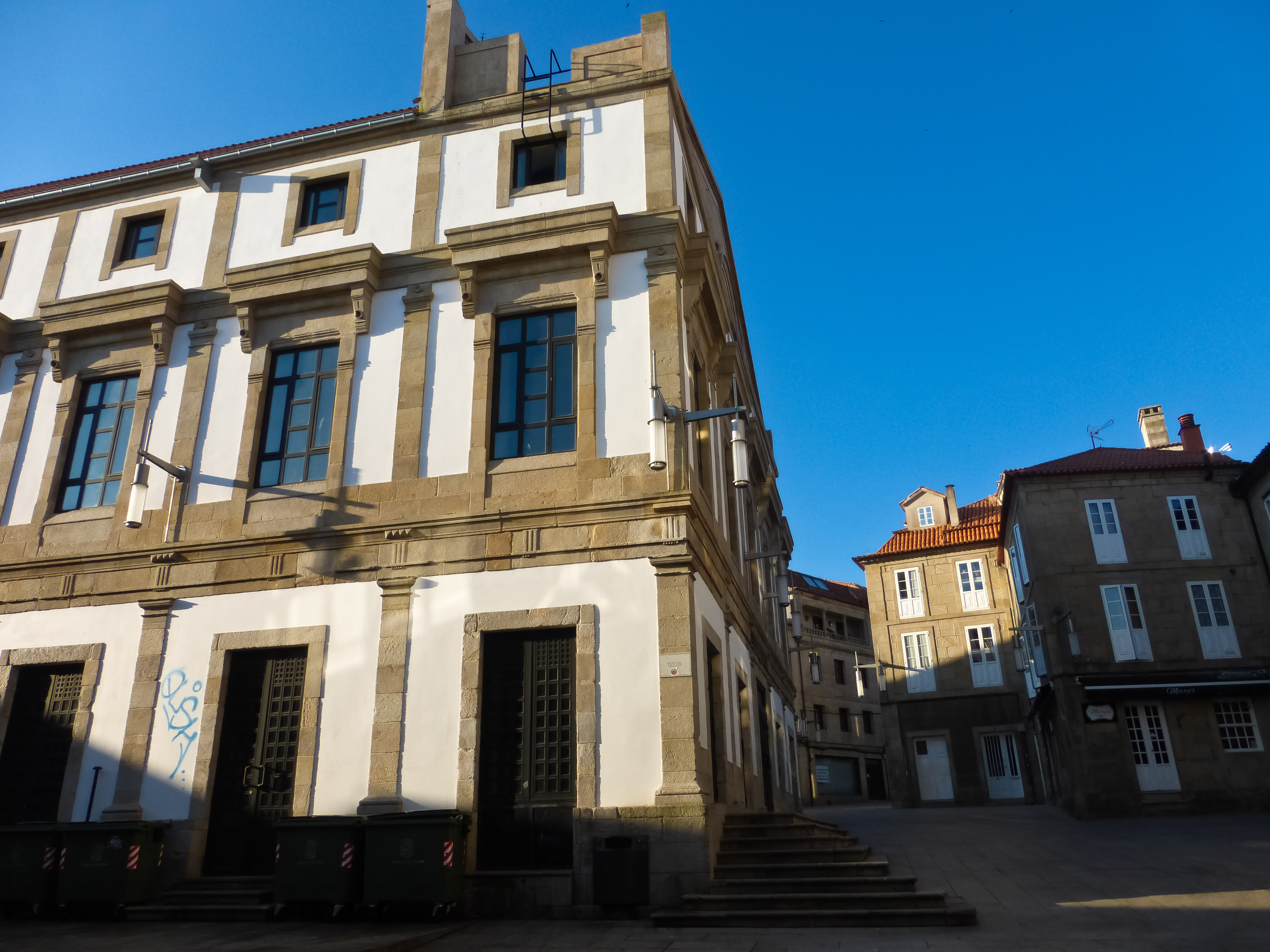
North façade

== See also ==
=== Bibliography ===
- Ayuntamiento de Pontevedra, 1985. Pontevedra recupera su Teatro Principal. Ed. Ayuntamiento de Pontevedra
- Fontoira Surís, Rafael (2009): Pontevedra monumental. Diputación de Pontevedra. ISBN 8484573273.
- Nieto, Remigio (1980) : Guía monumental ilustrada de Pontevedra. Asociación de Comerciantes de la Calle Manuel Quiroga, Pontevedra. p. 28.

=== Related articles ===
- Neoclassical architecture
- Liceo Casino
- Pontevedra City Hall
- Pontevedra Auditorium and Convention Centre

=== External links ===
- Theatre description
- Theatre history
- Theatre plan, pdf.
- Location
- Teatro principal on the website Galicia Tourism
- Teatro Principal on the website Rias Baixas Tourism
