= Leopoldo Nóvoa Garcia =

Uruguayan artist (1919-2012)

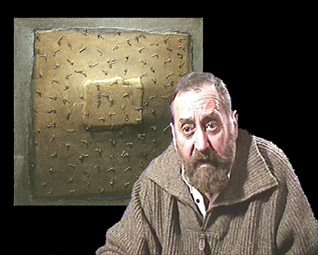
- Picture of Leopoldo Nóvoa García
- Born: December 17, 1919
- Died: February 23, 2012 (aged 92)
- Awards: Medalla Castelao, City of Pontevedra Prize, Galician Critics' Prize

Leopoldo Nóvoa García (born December 17, 1919 - February 23, 2012) was a Spanish-Uruguayan painter and sculptor.

== Life ==
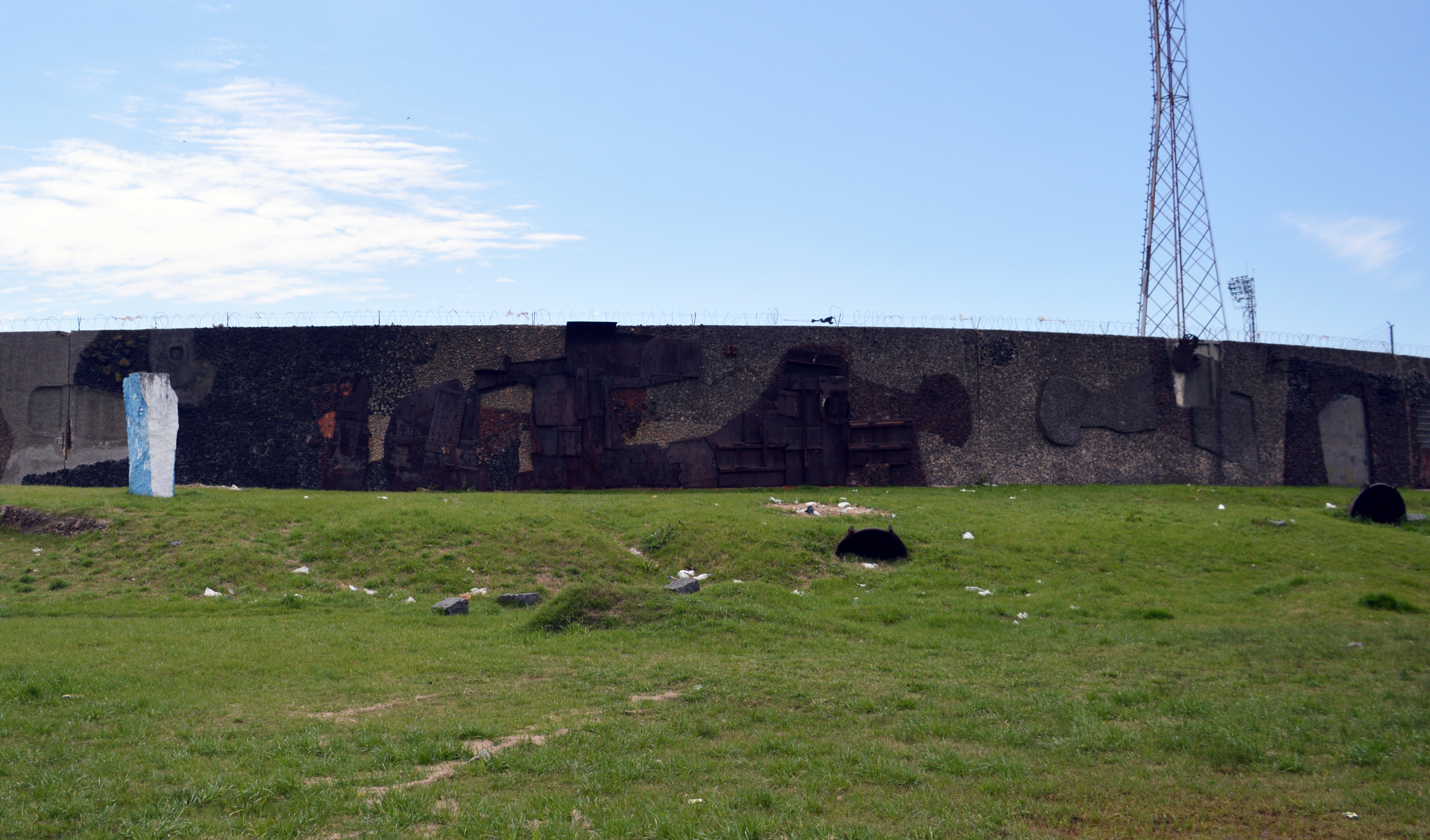
Nóvoa Garcia's mural at the Estadio Luis Tróccoli

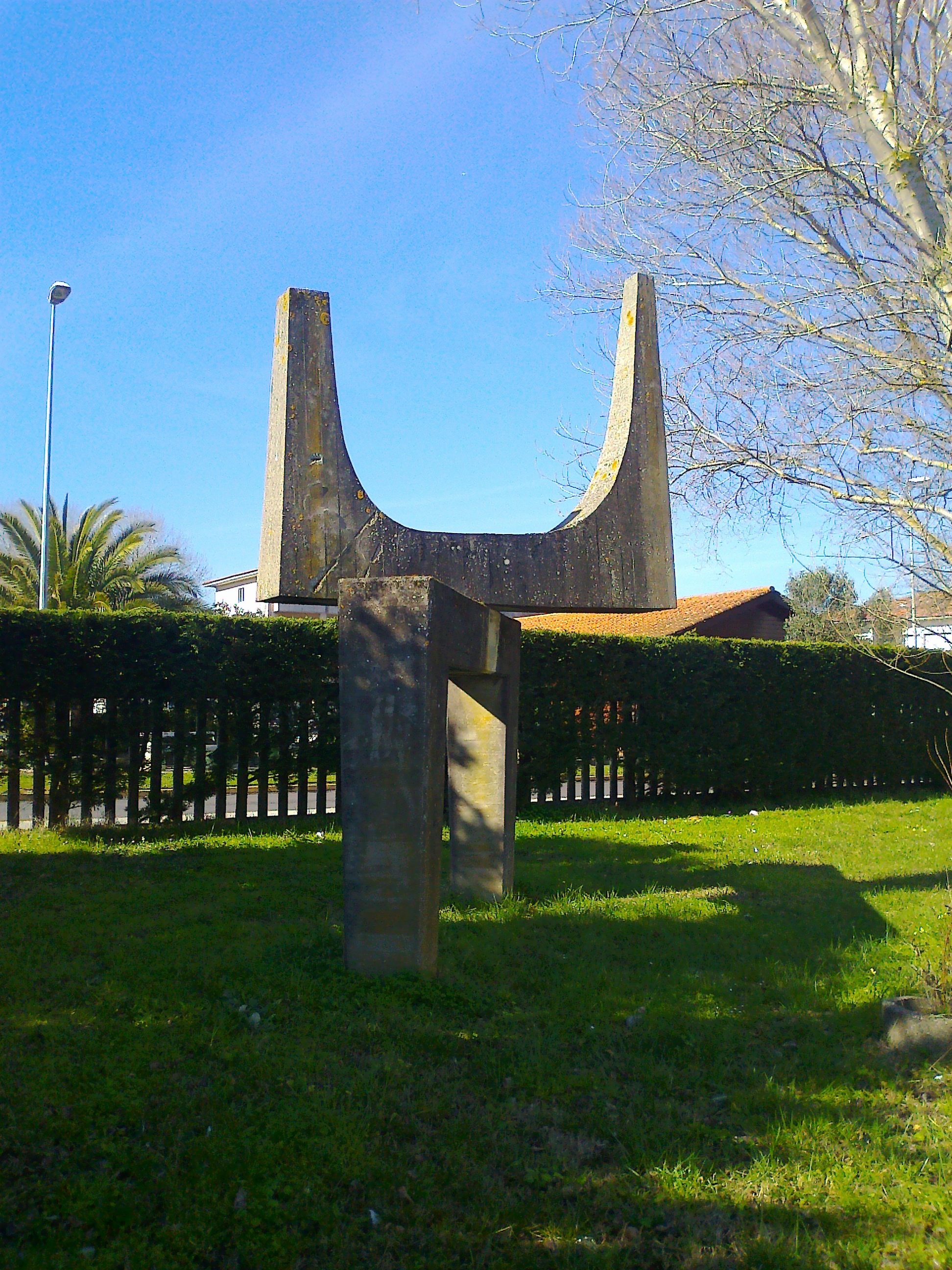
Sculpture in Ribeira

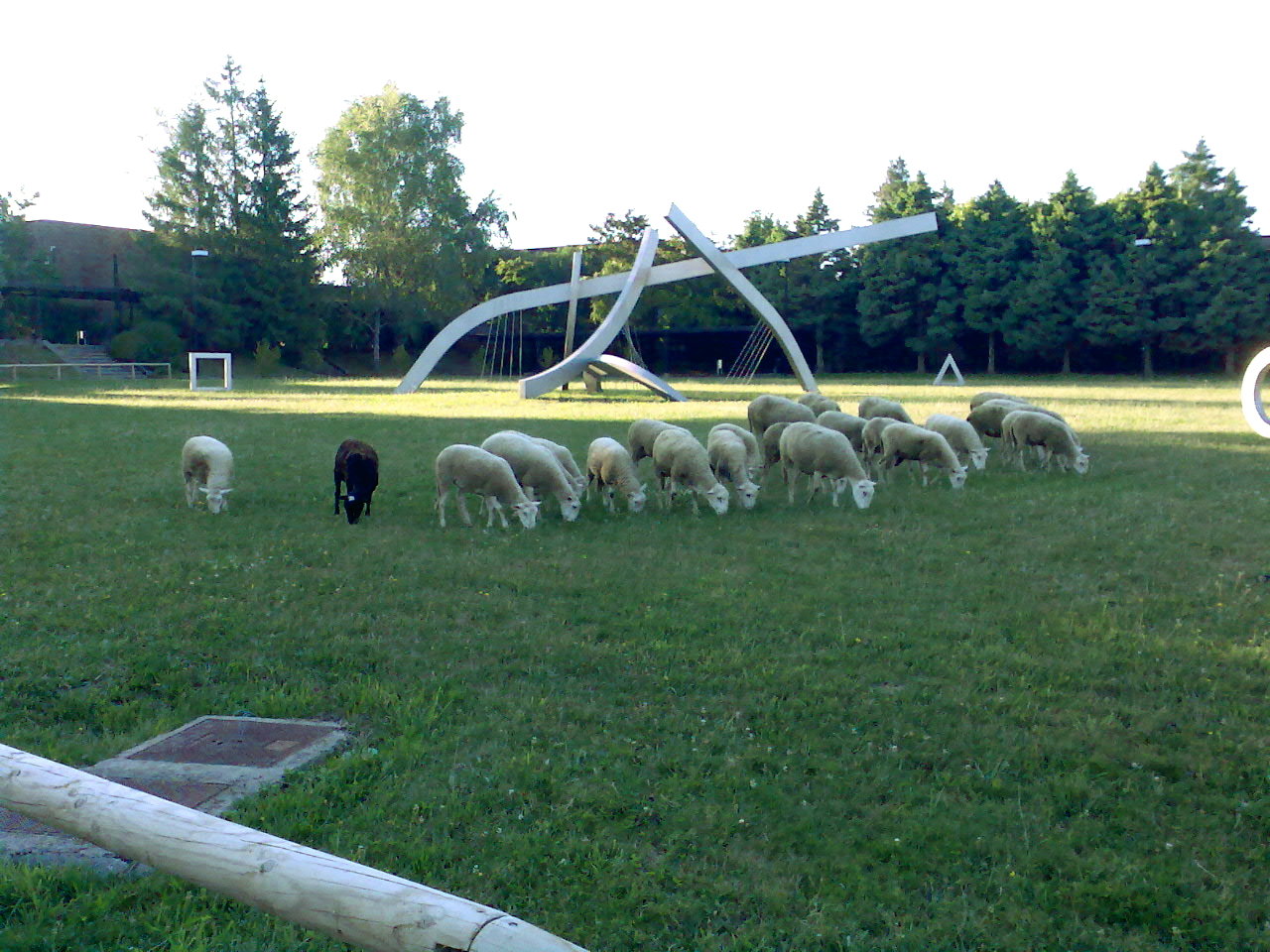
Sculpture in Vigo with sheep in foreground

Nóvoa Garcia was born in 1919, to a Galician mother and Uruguayan father. In 1938, he emigrated to Uruguay, where he met Joaquín Torres-García. He spent his early years in Uruguay in Montevideo, where he founded Apex, a culture-focused magazine, with Carlos Maggi and other Uruguayan artists and intellectuals. Artists like Joaquín Torres García, Juan Carlos Onetti, Juana de Ibarbourou, Julio María Sanguinetti, and Marta Canessa worked on the magazine and formed a close friendship with Jorge Oteiza. In Buenos Aires, where Nóvoa Garcia lived from 1948 to 1957, he became close friends with Lucio Fontana, who greatly influenced his work. Nóvoa Garcia was heavily influenced by other Galicians exiled by the Spanish Civil War such as Rafael Dieste and Luís Seoane.

After 1957, he came to settle in Montevideo, where he would remain for eight years. In 1965, Nóvoa Garcia moved to Paris at Michel Tapié's suggestion. Tapié had been impressed by Nóvoa Garcia's giant mural at the Estadio Luis Tróccoli in Montevideo. In Paris, Nóvoa Garcia impressed Julio Cortázar, who wrote a story about his work, and Orlando Pelayo.

In 1974, Nóvoa Garcia had his first solo exposition at the Edouard Loeb Gallery, which would remain his gallery for many years. Nóvoa Garcia remained active until his death in 2012, regularly working from his native Galicia.

== Works ==
Nóvoa Garcia's paintings, murals, and pyrography spanned a wide array of subjects. Many of his works focused on landscapes from his time in Galicia. Even so, his work was often abstract, with hints of abstract expressionism and informalism, even though he did not belong to any one artistic movement. He often worked with impersonal forms, juxtaposed rhythms, and imposing material, described by Raul Zaffaroni s "urgent painting" in 1964.

== Honors ==
- Castelao Medal, 1993
- City of Pontevedra Prize, 1997
- Galician Critics' Prize, 2002
