= Calle Real (Pontevedra) =

Medieval street in Pontevedra, Spain

Real Street
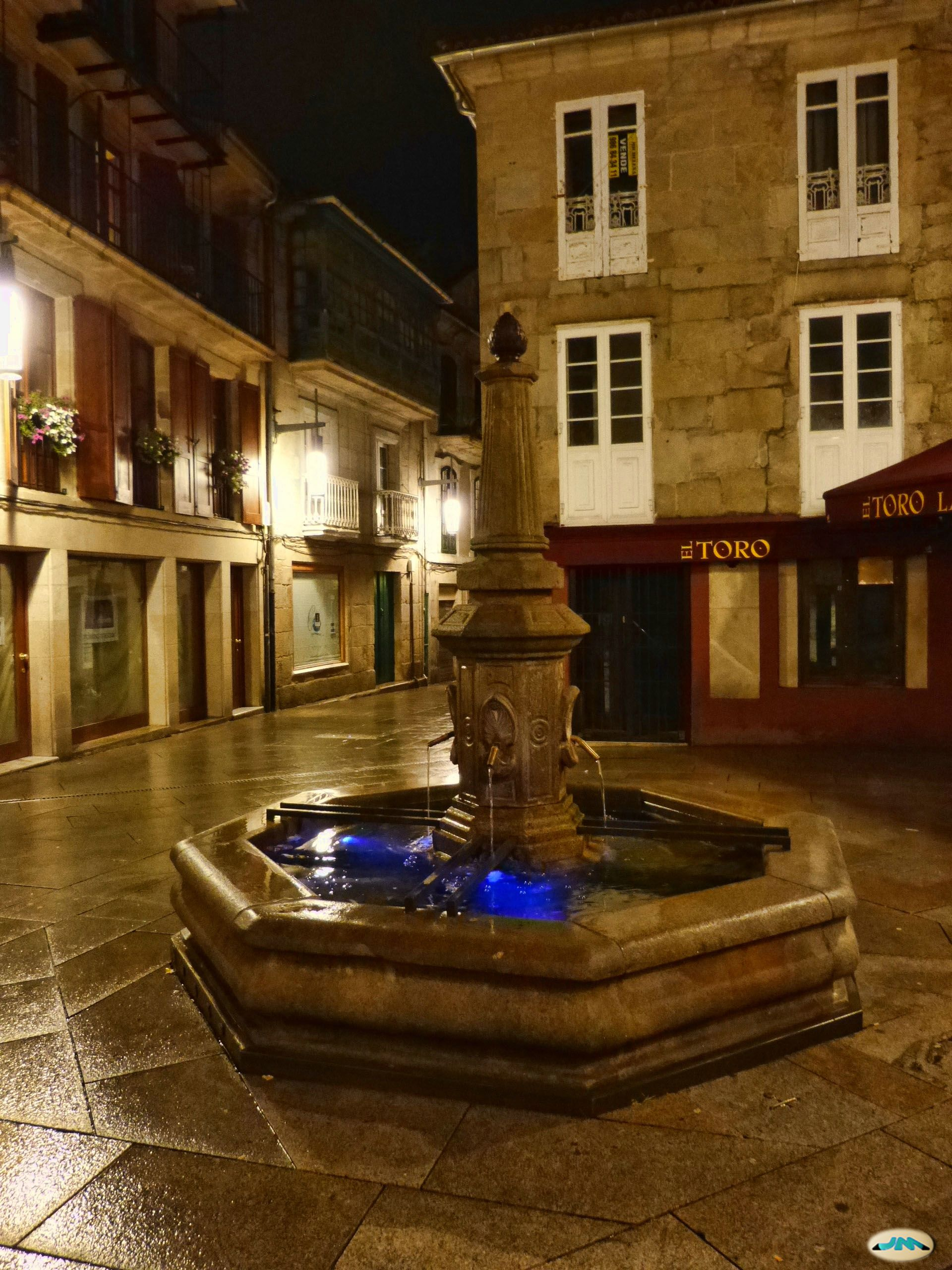
- The Tornos fountain in the middle of the street
- Native name: Calle Real (Spanish)
- Type: street
- Maintained by: Pontevedra City Council
- Location: Pontevedra, Spain
- Postal code: 36002
- Coordinates: 42.433083°N 8.645194°W

Calle Real (Galician: Rúa Real, or "Royal Street" in English) is a street in the Spanish city of Pontevedra, located in the city's historic centre.

== Location ==
Real Street runs north–south, between the Celso García de la Riega square, close to the Burgo bridge, and the Curros Enríquez square.

== History ==
The street's origins lie in the line of the ancient Roman road XIX on Antonine Itinerary, the remains of which can be found beneath the current pavement. Centuries later, in the Middle Ages, the street became a passageway on the Portuguese Way, when pilgrimages began.

From 1397 and over the following centuries, the street was known as Rúa do Rego (Street of the Gutter), due to the fact that it collected an abundance of water in a central channel, including that which flowed from the site of the Tornos fountain. In 1840, it was already called Real Street. In 1843, it was known as Padilla Street. It was one of the first streets in Pontevedra to be paved between the 1850s and 1860s, and in 1872 the Tornos pyramid fountain was installed in the middle of the street.

At the beginning of the 20th century, Real Street was one of the city's main streets, due to its high footfall, as it was an obligatory stop on the way north out of the city, and due to its commercial life and numerous shops. In 1931, it was renamed Pi y Margall Street, before reverting to its traditional name.

== Description ==
This is a 200-metre-long paved pedestrian street that slopes down to the north in the heart of Pontevedra's Old Town, linking the Celso García de la Riega square, via the east side of the Teucer square, to the Curros Enríquez square. Its average width is 3.70 metres.

The centre of the pavement of Real Street is marked by a line of small blue lights that indicate the route of the Portuguese Way to Santiago de Compostela. In the centre of the street is the Tornos Fountain. This neoclassical pyramid-shaped fountain was built in granite in 1872. It replaced another fountain dating from the 16th century, which was shaped like a pear and ended in a pine cone.

On the west side of the Teucer square, opposite the Marquis of Aranda's Pazo, there is a monumental fountain built in 1970, built into the wall that surrounds the square and bridges the difference in level with Real street.

Real Street is one of the busiest shopping streets in the historic centre of the city and a point of reference for traditional commerce. It is home to traditional establishments such as the Ferreteria Gallega (Galician hardware store), opened in 1947, the Cestigar wicker basket shop, the Casa Bravo leather goods shop, the Ultramarinos Diego Lores grocery shop (opened in the 1920s) and the Tres Rías tailor, opened in 1972. Other very popular shops eventually closed, such as the Ultramarinos El Cisne grocery shop (founded in March 1941 and closed in October 2021).

The street is also home to iconic restaurants such as the Cre-Cottê creperie and a charming hotel, the Boa Vila, which opened in 2009.

== Outstanding buildings ==
At numbers 1 and 3 of the Real street, what remains of the former 17th-century Counts of San Román Pazo, which was the largest palace in the city and whose main façade overlooked the Curros Enríquez square, forms part of the present-day houses.

At number 10, opposite the Teucer square, is the Marquis of Aranda's Pazo (mayor of the Kingdom of Galicia). It dates from the early 18th century and has a crenellated tower (originally there were two crenellated towers at either end) and a coat of arms on its large façade with the only figures of two tenants on either side in a city coat of arms.

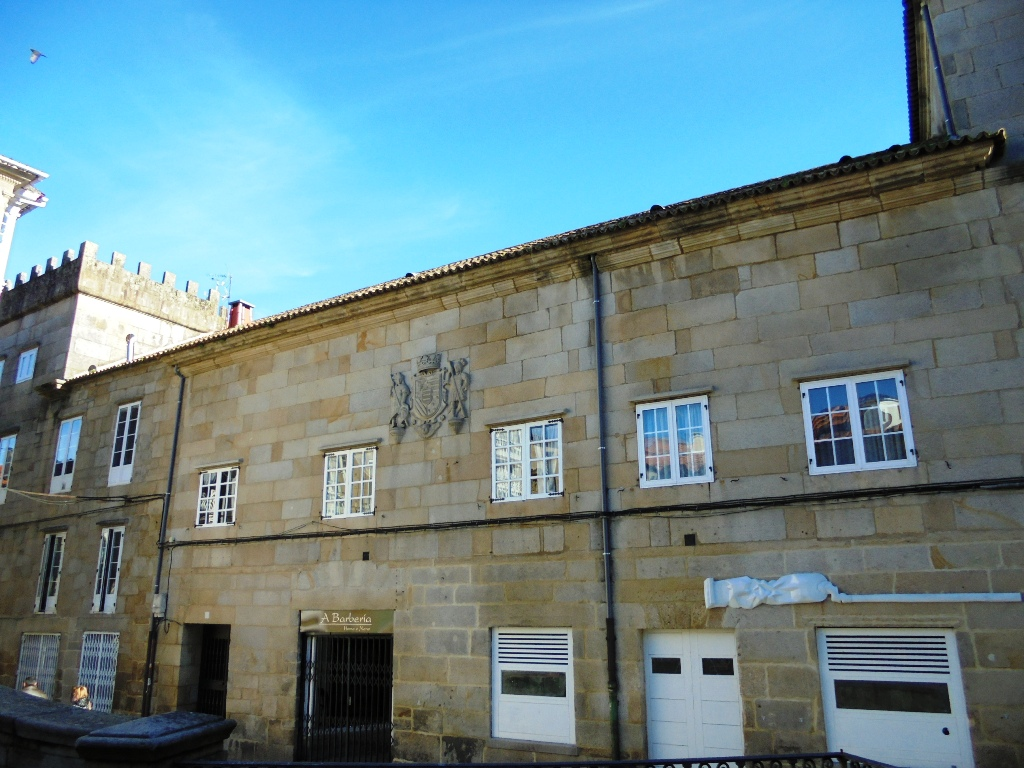
Marquis of Aranda Pazo

At number 28, is the former mansion of the Dukes of Oleiros. Dating from the 12th century, it is the third oldest building in the town. It belonged to the Dukes of Oleiros and then to the Castiñeira family. The ground floor was used as a wine cellar and servants' quarters, and also housed the former stables. It still has the railings that separated it from the courtyard, from which light was drawn as there was only one window. The chapel was located on the first floor and the noble family's living quarters on the second floor. Today, the ground floor houses the Cre-Cottê creperie.

At number 30 is the Ozores House, which originally belonged to the son of Pedro Barbeito y Padrón, of the noble Barbeito family. It is Baroque in architecture, with two balconies on the first floor, but Renaissance in origin. Its façade is decorated with ten busts or heads, just like the House of the Heads of the same noble family, located in the Estrella square, next to the Herrería square. Between the two balconies, it features a 17th-century coat of arms with mantling, helmet and plume. Nine lineages are represented: Barbeito (castle from which a dog emerges), Padrón (large column or stone and two scallops), Vega de León (tower), Falcón (arm holding a falcon), Montenegro (M with crown), Cru (tree and two lambs), Navarro or Lera (pieces like bells in a row), Mariño (three waves surmounted by a scallop) and Salazar (thirteen stars). On the ground floor of the house is the famous hardware store Ferretería Gallega.

At the end of the lower part of the street, on the corner of the Celso García de la Riega square and close to the Burgo bridge, stands the Old Mail House, of Gothic origin, distinguished by its main façade with a basket-arched entrance, an alfiz along the façade and a coat of arms bearing the arms of the Ibaizábal, Villegas, Aldao and Salazar families, and another smaller square coat of arms on the side façade on the Real street, bearing the coat of arms of the Murga family. This is one of the oldest houses in the city, having belonged to the Ibaizábal and Murga families. The house was used as an office for mail delivery in Pontevedra.

== Gallery ==
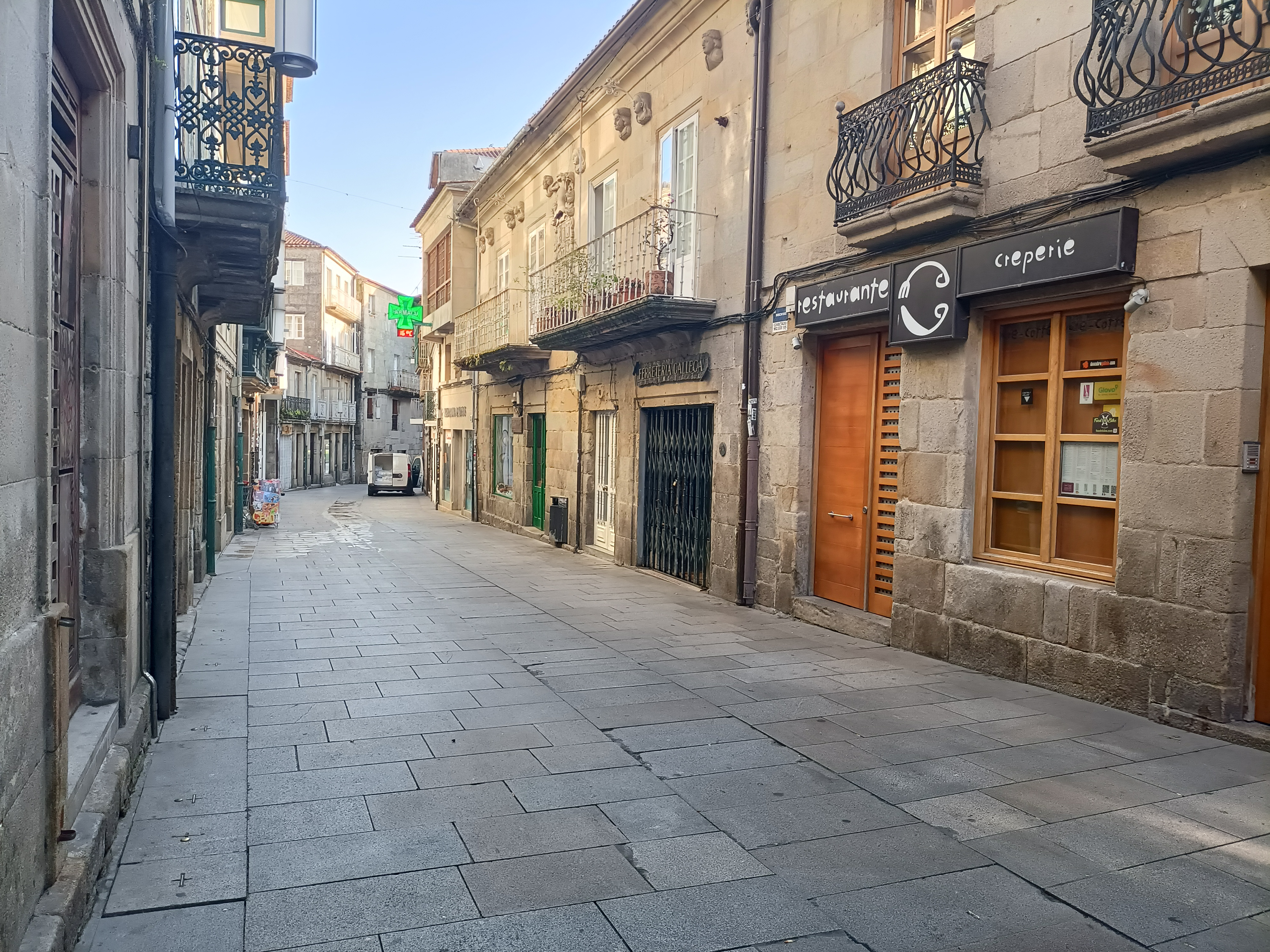
Real Street

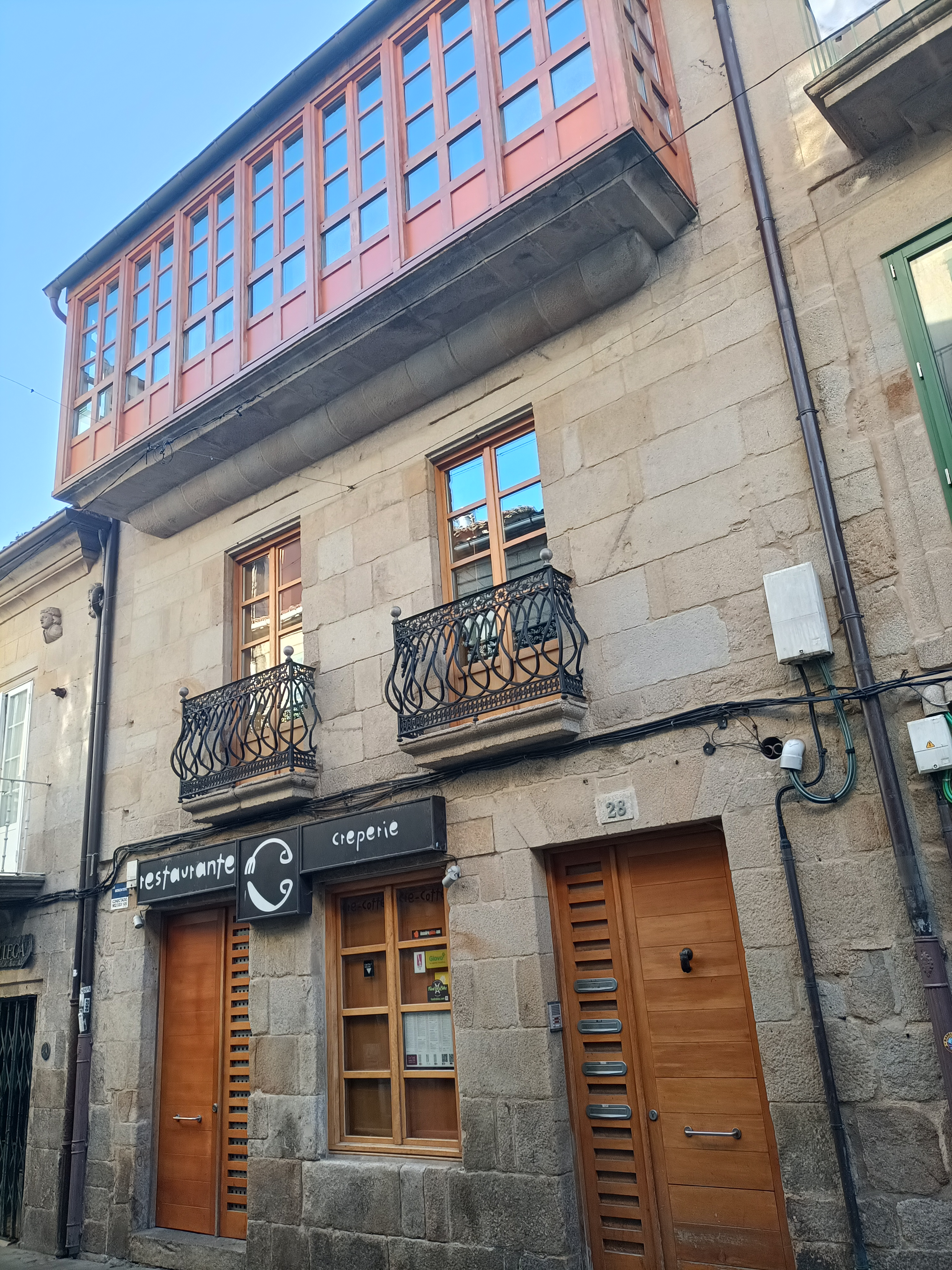
Mansion of the Dukes of Oleiros

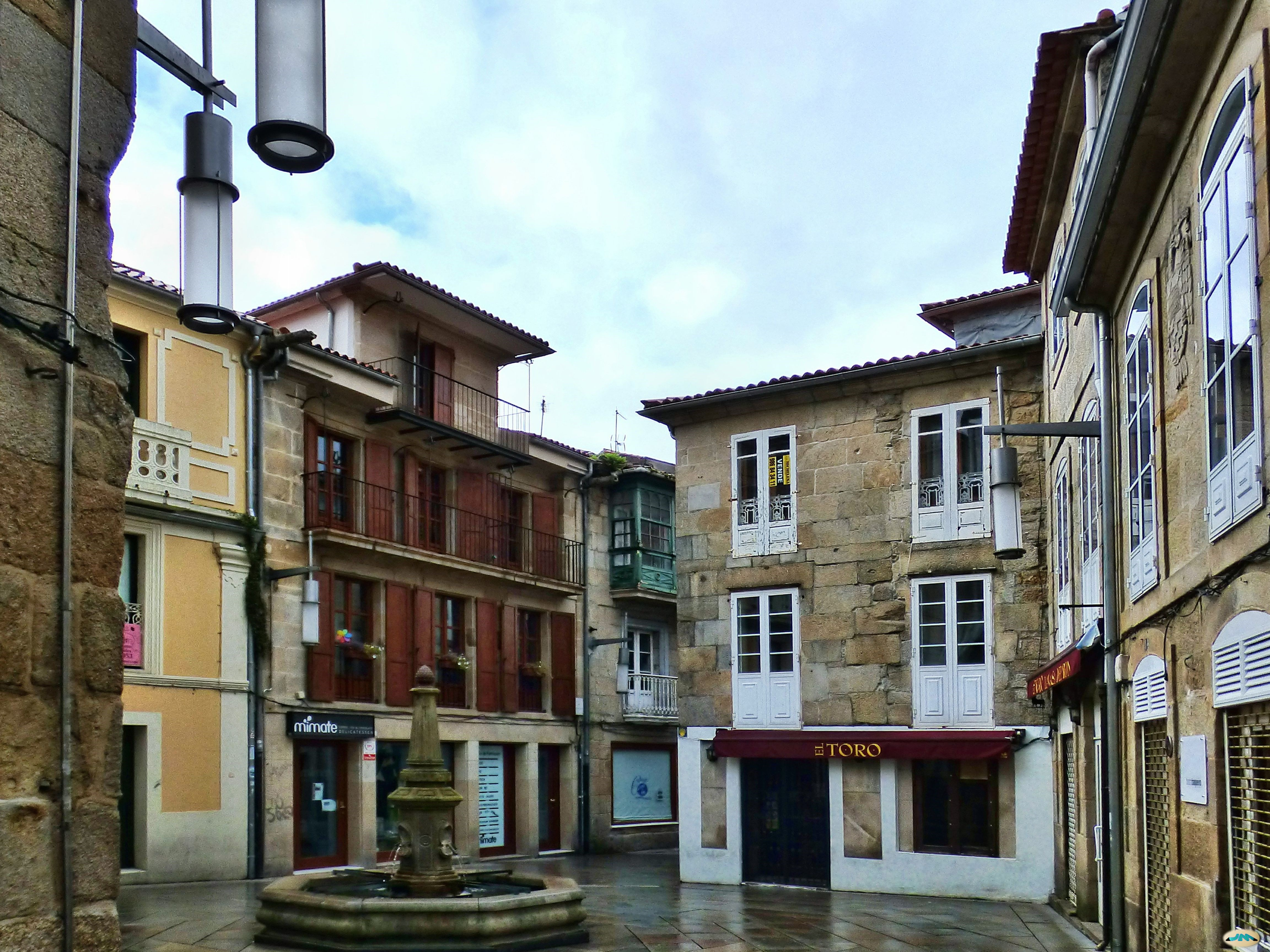
Tornos fountain

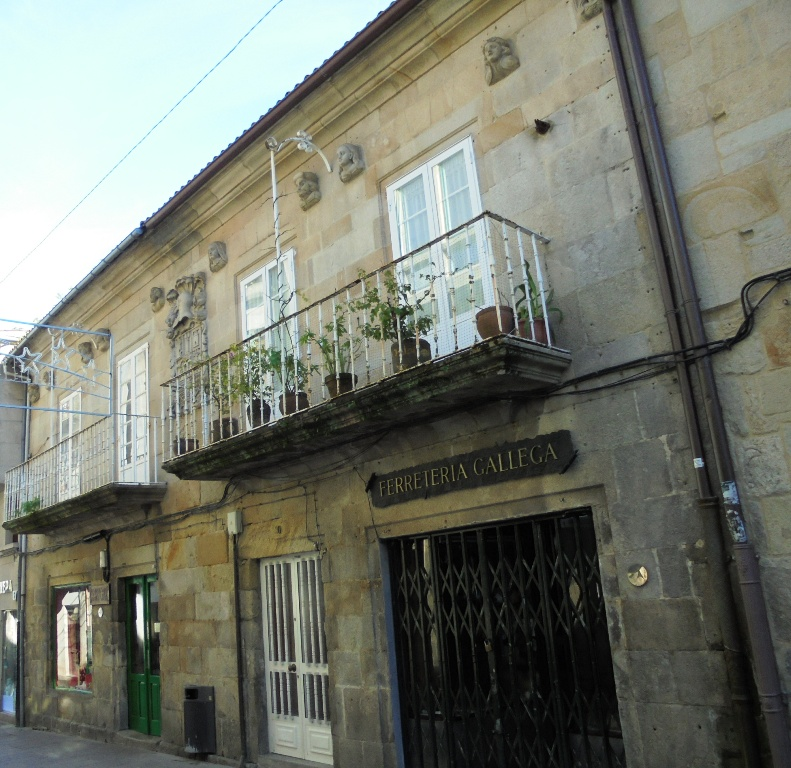
Ozores House

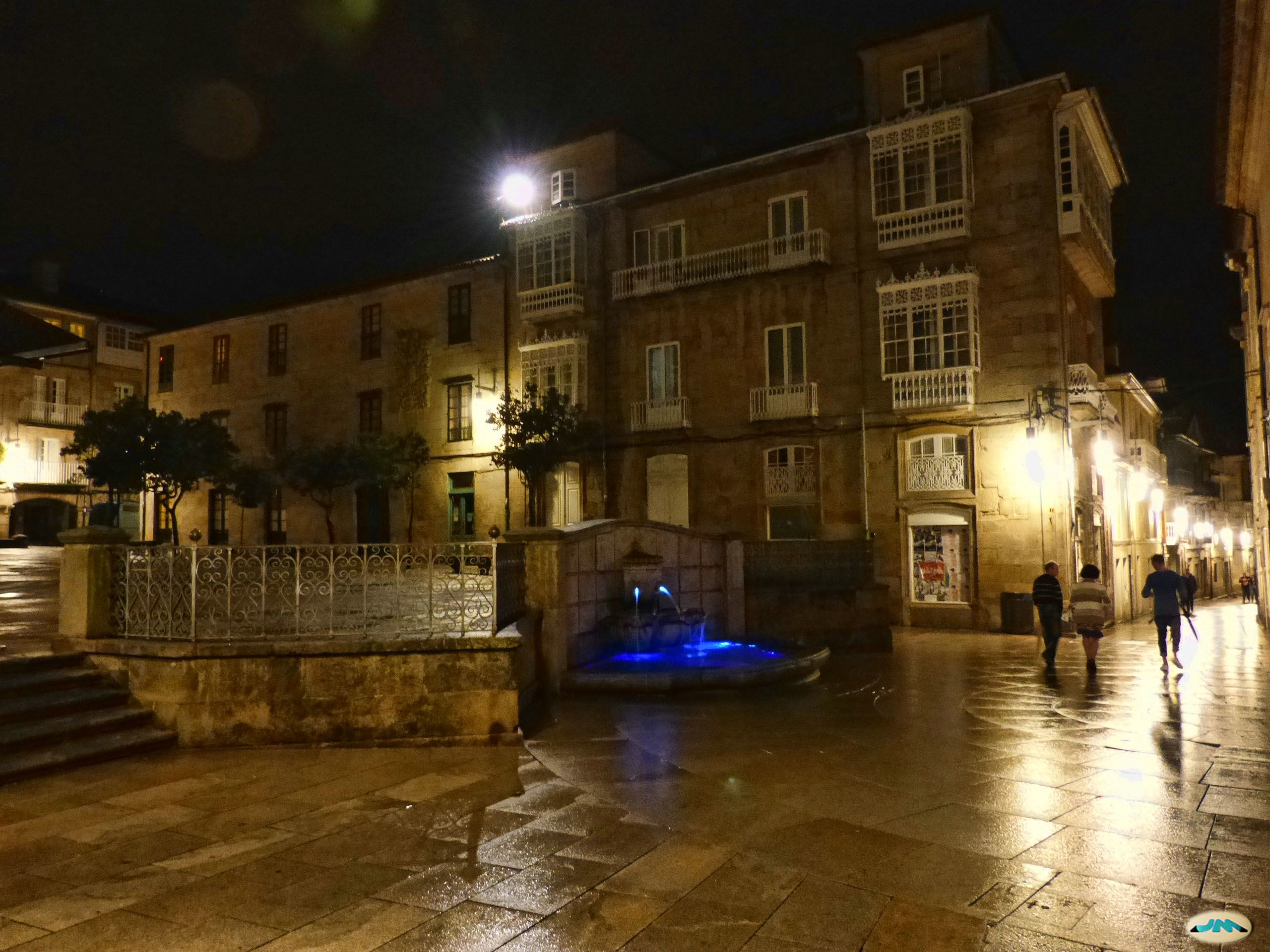
Monumental fountain

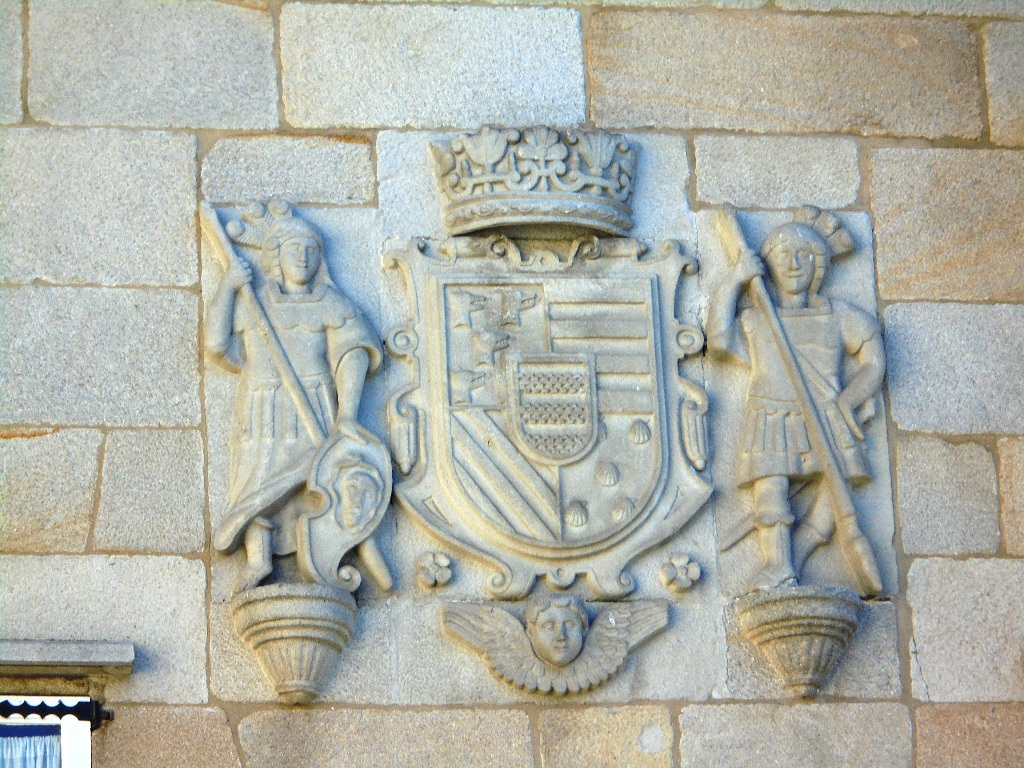
Coat of arms with tenants of the Marquis of Aranda's manor house.

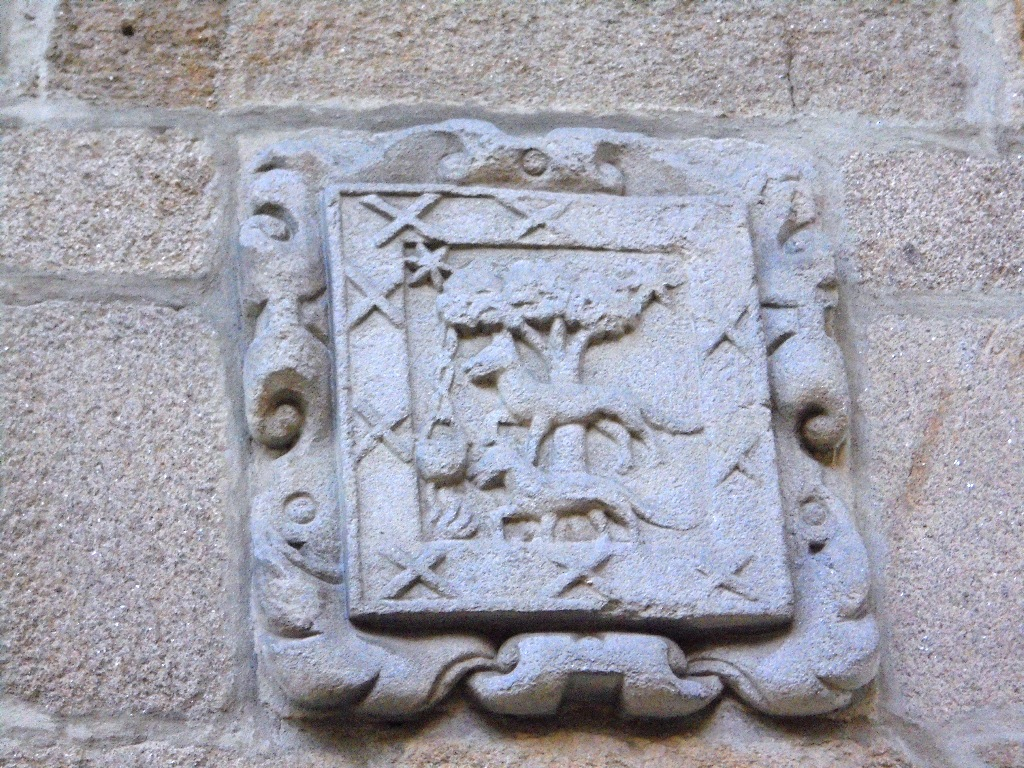
Coat of Arms of the Old Mail House on Real Street

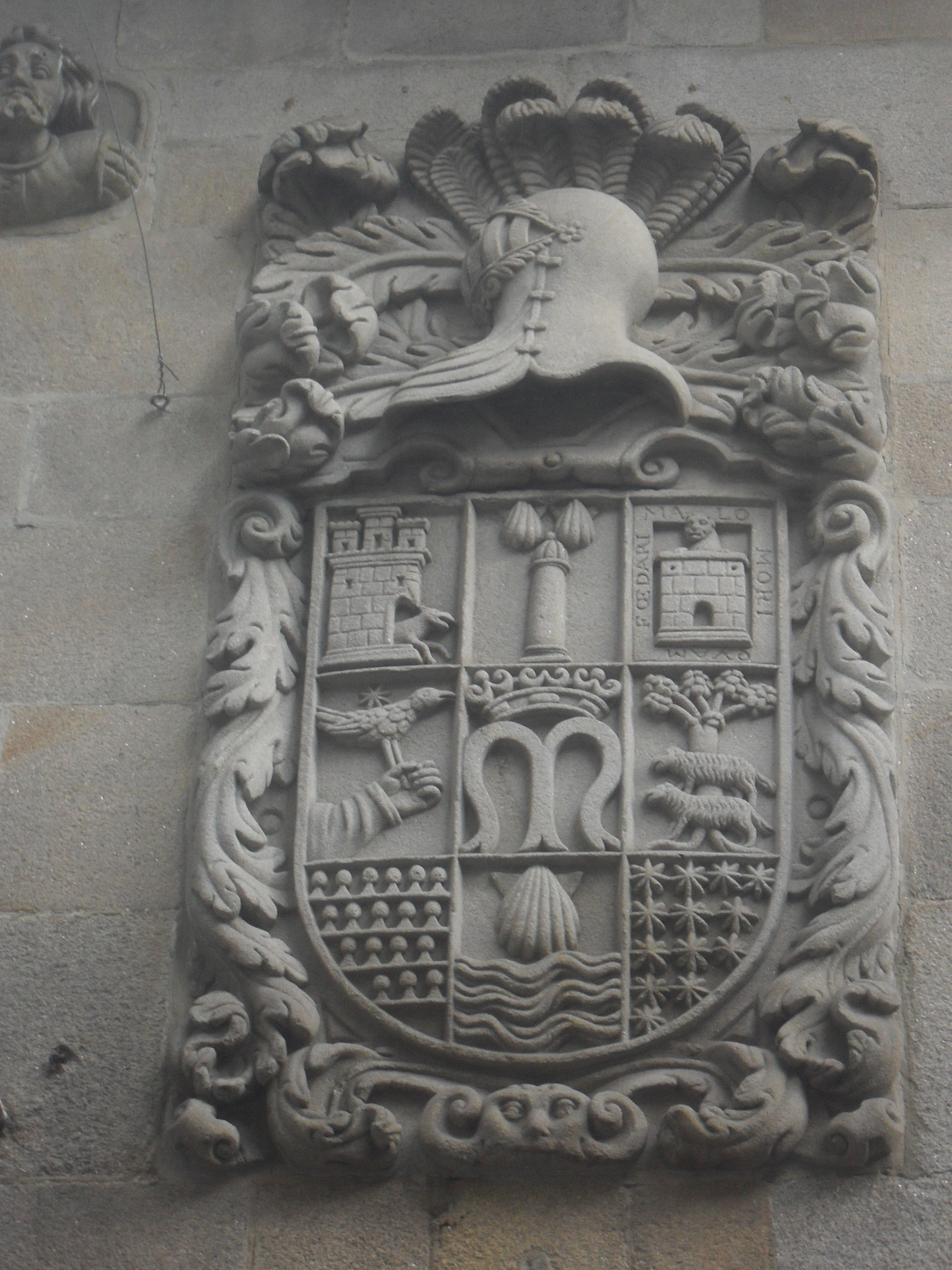
Coat of Arms of the Ozores House

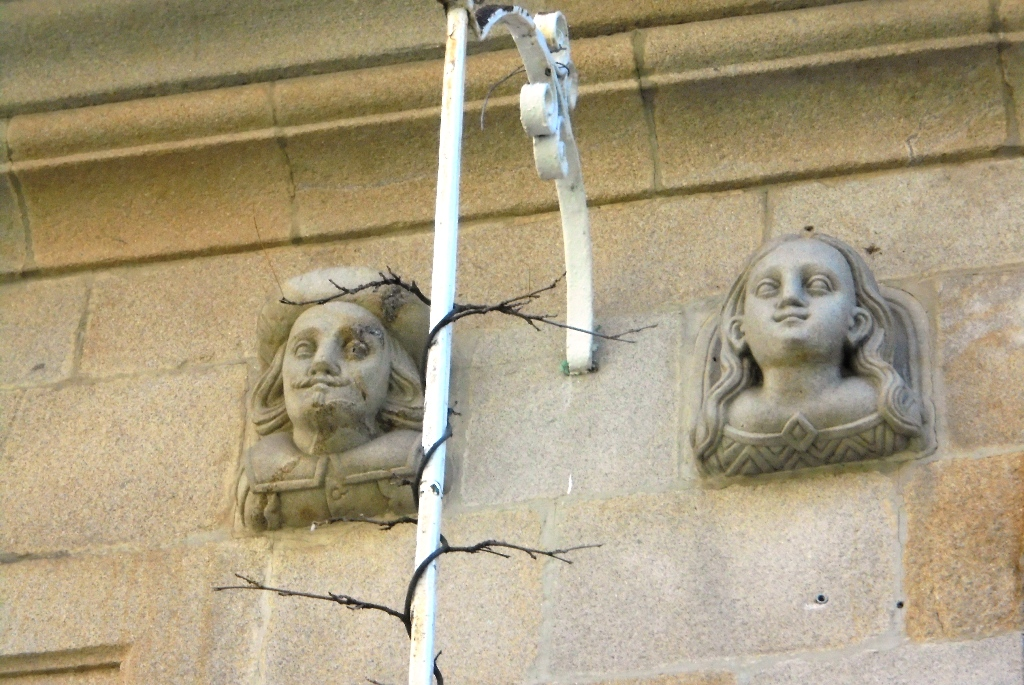
Renaissance busts with heads in the Ozores House

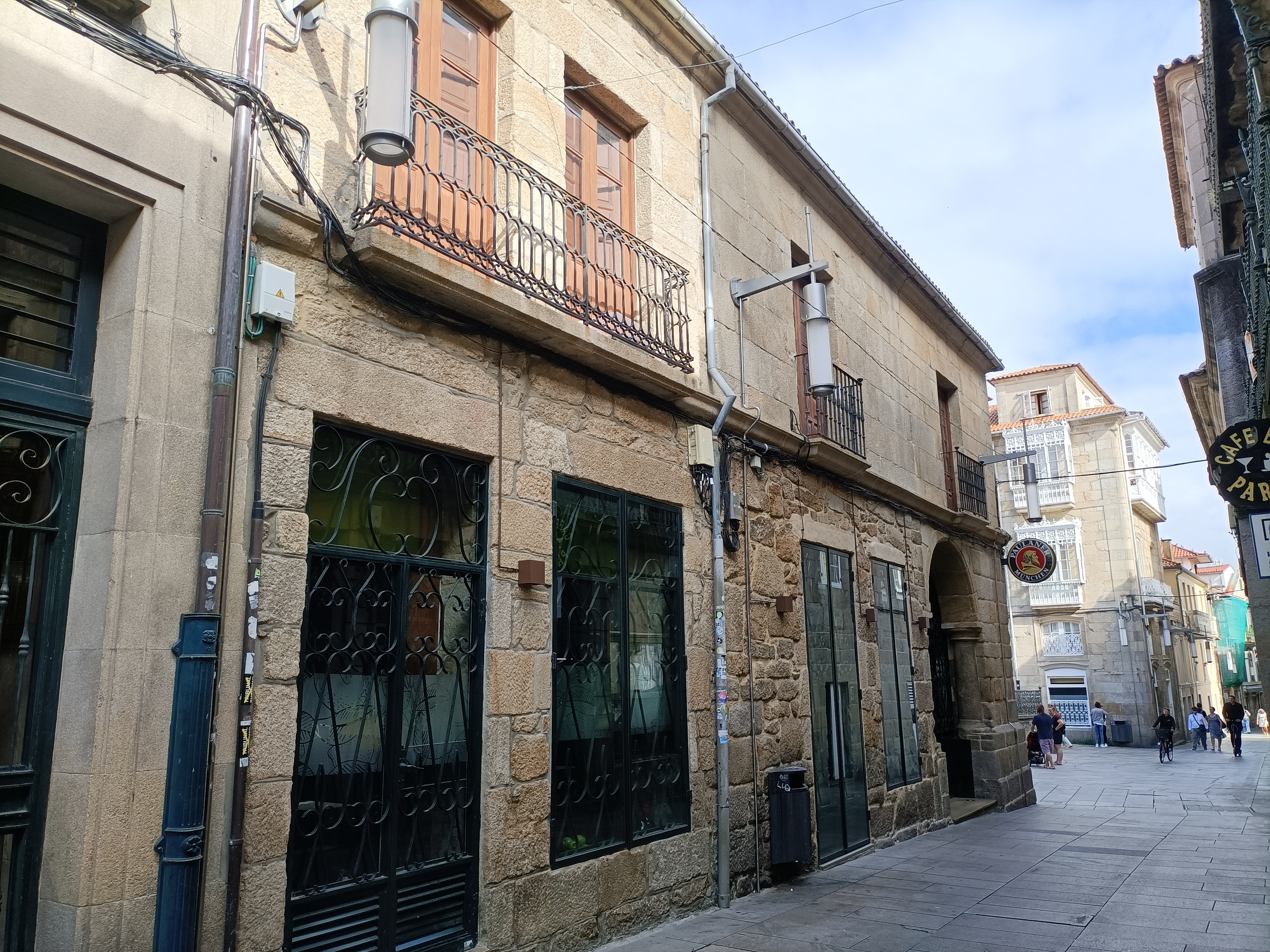
Remains of the manor house of the Counts of San Román

== See also ==
=== Bibliography ===
- Aganzo, Carlos (2010). Pontevedra. Ciudades con encanto (in Spanish). Madrid: El País-Aguilar. p. 67; 82. ISBN 978-8403509344.
- Fontoira Surís, Rafael (2009). Pontevedra monumental (in Galician). Pontevedra: Diputación de Pontevedra. p. 221; 284. ISBN 9788484573272.
- Fortes Bouzán, Xosé (2011). Pontevedra. Burgo, villa, capital (in Spanish). Brión (A Coruña): Giverny. p. 387. ISBN 978-84-939449-1-9.
- Juega Puig, Juan (2000). As rúas de Pontevedra (in Galician). Pontevedra: Diputación de Pontevedra. p. 106. ISBN 84-8457-044-4.
- Messia de la Cerda y Pita, Luis F. (1989). Heráldica, escudos de armas labrados en piedra existentes en la zona de Pontevedra (in Spanish). Pontevedra: Diputación de Pontevedra. pp. 236–238. ISBN 848684522X.
- Nieto González, Remigio (1980). Pontevedra. Guía monumental ilustrada (in Spanish). Pontevedra: Asociación de comerciantes de la calle Manuel Quiroga. p. 30.
- Riveiro Tobío, Elvira (2008). Descubrir Pontevedra (in Spanish). Pontevedra: Edicións do Cumio. p. 224. ISBN 9788482890852.

=== Related articles ===
- Old Town of Pontevedra
- Teucer square
- Curros Enríquez square
