= Casa del Correo Viejo =

Gothic house in Pontevedra, Spain

- Casa do Correo Vello
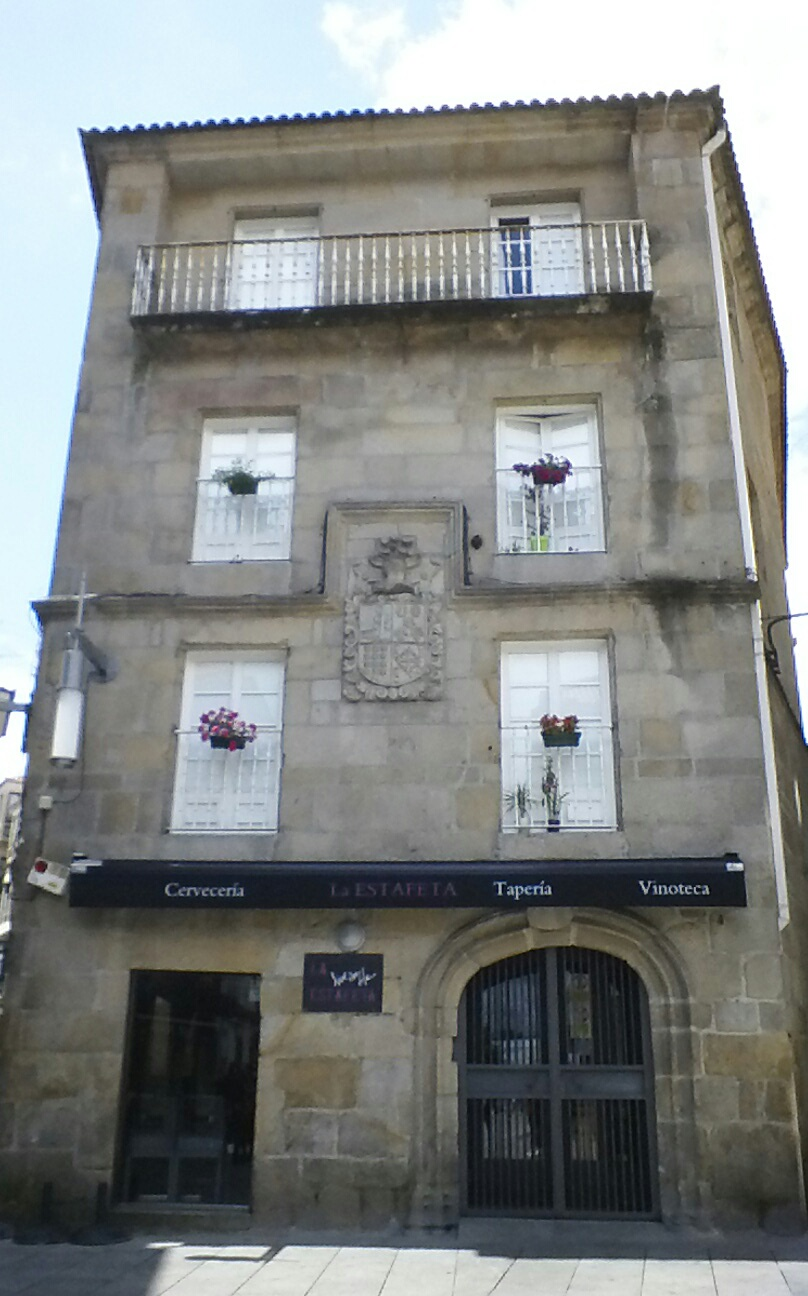
- Interactive map of the Casa del Correo Viejo area

General information
- Type: House
- Location: Pontevedra, Galicia, Spain
- Coordinates: 42°26′03″N 8°38′42″W
- Completed: 16th century
- Owner: Private property

Technical details
- Floor count: 4
- Floor area: 112 m2

The Casa del Correo Viejo (Old Mail House) is a 16th-century Gothic nobleman's house in the old town of Pontevedra, Spain.

== Location ==
The house is located in Celso García de la Riega Square, at the northern end of the historic centre of Pontevedra, very close to the Burgo Bridge, one of the main entrances to the medieval town. One of its side façades overlooks Real Street and the Portuguese Way, as well as the ancient Roman road XIX, while the other overlooks San Nicolás Street.

== History ==
It is one of the oldest civil buildings in the city. This noble house was built in the 16th century at the behest of two Basque families from the province of Álava, the Ibaizábal and Murga families, who settled in the old town of Pontevedra and took up residence here. The Murga family, who spread to other parts of the Iberian Peninsula, arrived in Pontevedra related to the Ibaizábal family. The house was subsequently modified.

The house owes its name to the function of the Mail House to which its ground floor was dedicated, with a postal service as early as 1707. It was used as a post office in the 18th century due to its excellent location, very close to the Burgo Bridge and the Portuguese Way. The father of Fray Martín Sarmiento, the kingdom's postmaster in Pontevedra, was linked to the house.

== Description ==
This is a late Gothic house from the 16th century, with a ground floor and three upper floors. Its main façade features a typical 16th-century alfiz, which runs along the façade facing Celso García de la Riega Square and borders the upper part with a large coat of arms bearing the arms of the Ibaizábal (with a tree), Villegas (with a cross and eight cauldrons), Aldao (with five fleurs-de-lis) and Salazar (represented by thirteen stars) families. The coat of arms is adorned with a helmet with its plume and decorated with mantling, as well as an angel's head below the point of the coat of arms.

The main entrance to the house remains intact, topped by a three-centred basket-handle arch and a small coat of arms in the keystone of the arch. The windows on the first two floors of the house are doorways with balconies, and the window on the third floor has a balcony running the length of the façade.

On the left-hand side of Real Street, another small square coat of arms bears the coat of arms of the Murga family, originally from the Ayala municipality and closely related to the Ibaizábal family.

== Gallery ==
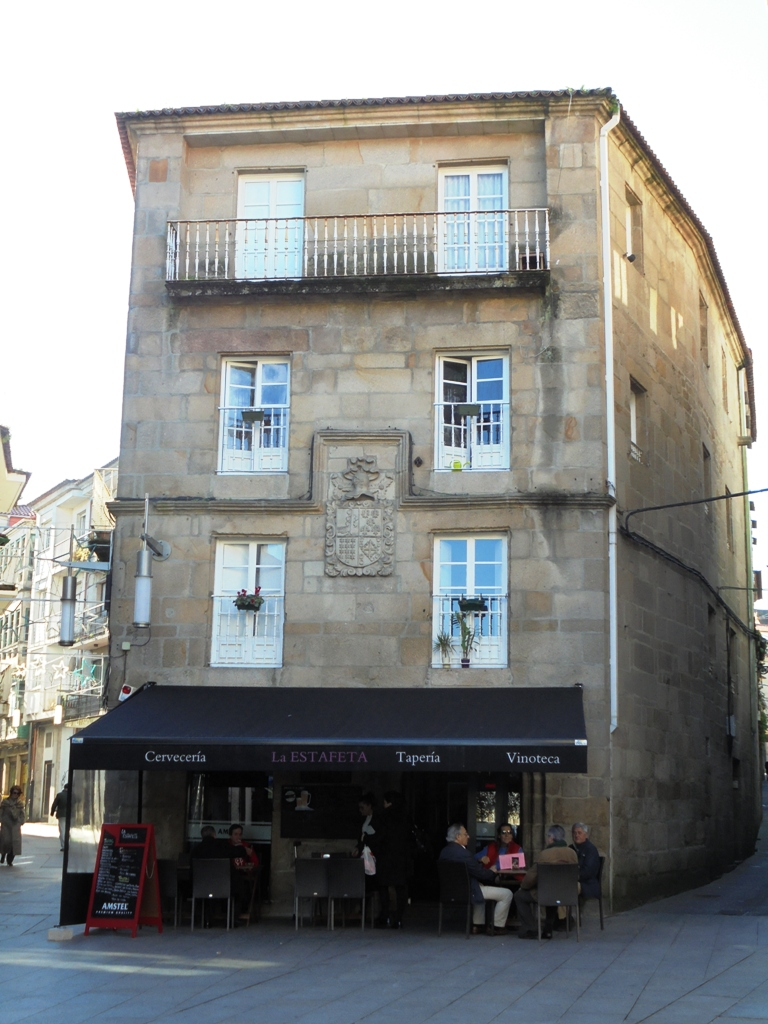
Main façade

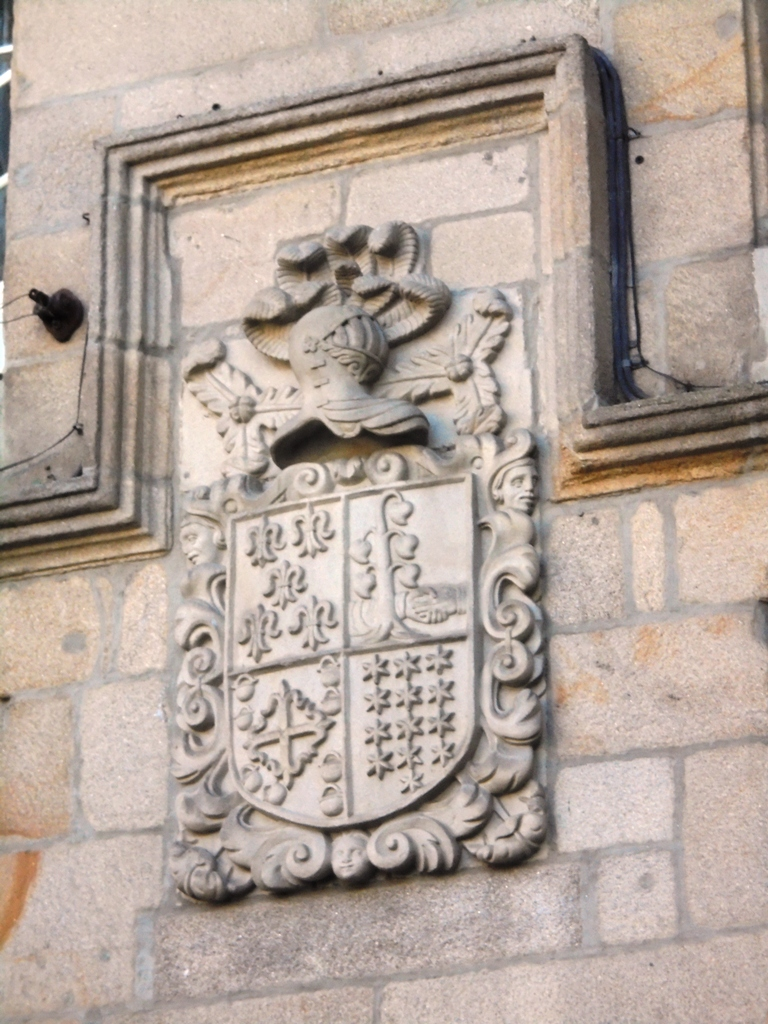
Coat of arms on the main façade

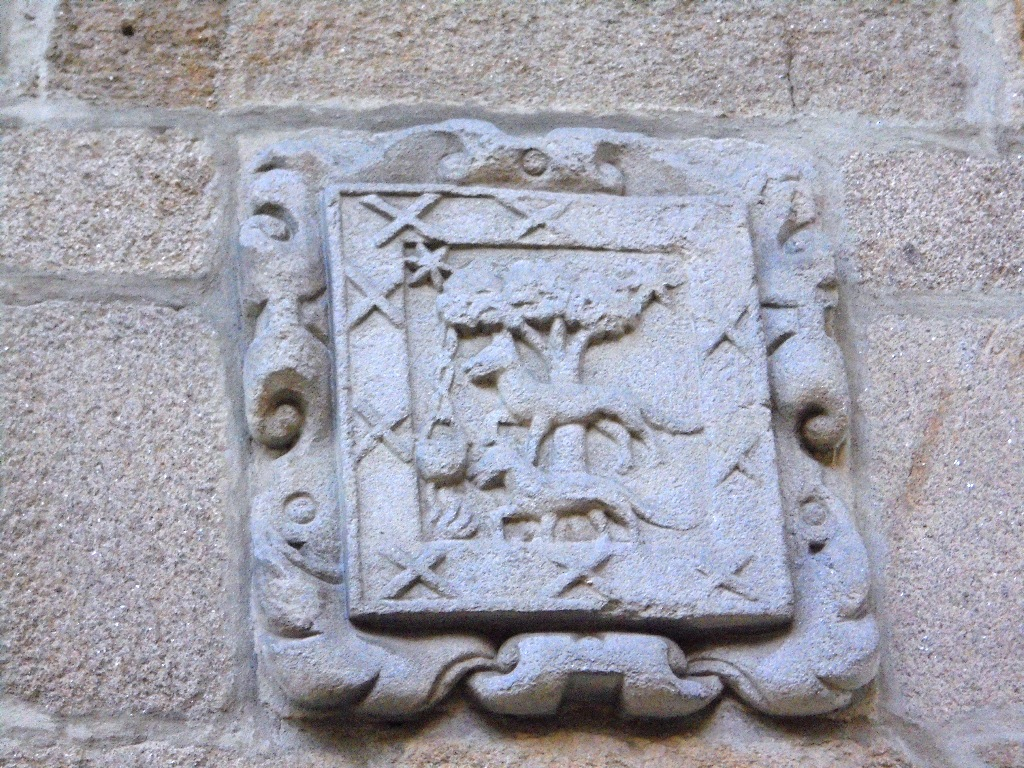
Coat of arms on the side façade

== See also ==
=== Bibliography ===
- Aganzo, Carlos (2010). Pontevedra. Ciudades con encanto (in Spanish). Madrid: El País-Aguilar. p. 82. ISBN 978-8403509344.
- Fontoira Surís, Rafael (2009). Pontevedra monumental (in Galician). Pontevedra: Diputación de Pontevedra. p. 221. ISBN 9788484573272.
- Messia de la Cerda y Pita, Luis F. (1989). Heráldica, escudos de armas labrados en piedra existentes en la zona de Pontevedra (in Spanish). Diputación de Pontevedra. pp. 242–244. ISBN 848684522X.
- Nieto González, Remigio (1980). Pontevedra. Guía monumental ilustrada (in Spanish). Pontevedra: Asociación de comerciantes de la calle Manuel Quiroga. p. 30.
- Riveiro Tobío, Elvira (2008). Descubrir Pontevedra (in Spanish). Pontevedra: Edicións do Cumio. pp. 24–25. ISBN 9788482890852.

=== Related articles ===
- Old Town of Pontevedra
- Royal Street

=== External links ===
- Casa del Correo Viejo on the website Patrimonio Galego
