= Plaza de Curros Enríquez =

Medieval square in Pontevedra, Spain

Curros Enríquez square
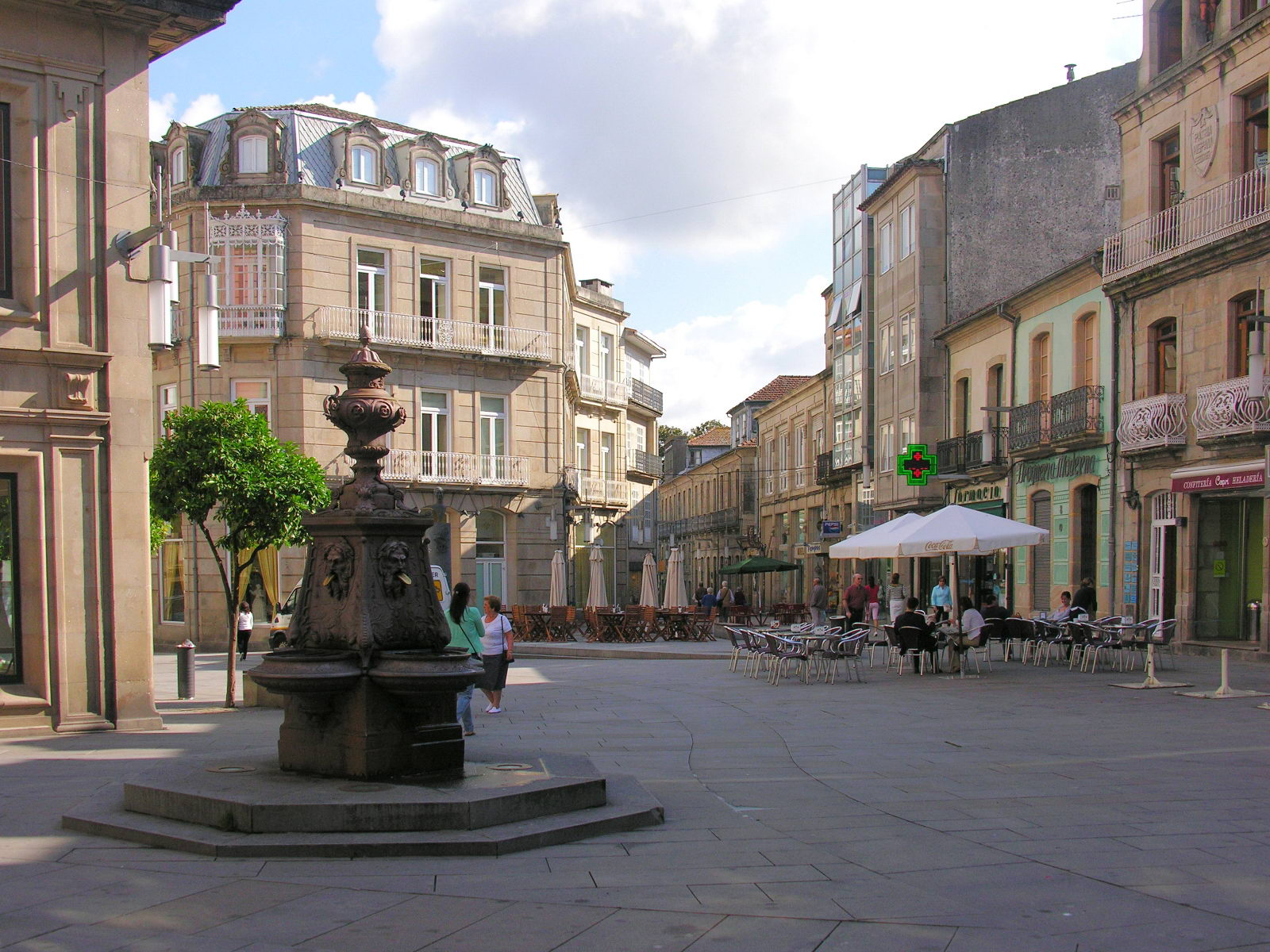
- The square with its 19th century fountain
- Native name: Plaza Curros Enríquez (Spanish)
- Type: plaza
- Maintained by: Pontevedra City Council
- Location: Pontevedra, Spain
- Postal code: 36002
- Coordinates: 42.432030°N 8.645022°W

Curros Enríquez Square is a square of medieval origin located in the heart of the historic centre of Pontevedra (Spain), on the Portuguese pilgrimage way.

== Origin of the name ==
The square is named after the 19th century Galician poet Manuel Curros Enríquez, one of the writers of the Rexurdimento.

== History ==
The square emerged in the Middle Ages as a space located at the confluence of Don Gonzalo Street (the street with the oldest name in the city, since it already bore this name in the 16th century), Hospital Street (now Real Street), Alfayates Street (now Manuel Quiroga Street), and Soportales Street. The first written references to the existence of this square date back to 1399.

In 1439, the wealthy lady of Pontevedra, Teresa Pérez Fiota, donated her property in her will for the foundation of a hospital for the poor called "Cuerpo de Dios" (later Corpus Christi and San Juan de Dios in 1597)), located in this square, which remained under the care of the Friars of San Juan de Dios until the 19th century.

Due to this fact, the square became known in the early modern period as the Hospital Square and later as the Platería Nova Square. From the 18th century onwards, it was known as San Román Square, as the main façade of the majestic pazo of the Counts of San Román (now disappeared) overlooked this square.

From the end of the 19th century, the square has had an eminently commercial function. In 1886, Almacenes Olmedo, a large textile shop, opened in the building known as the Olmedo Building.

In 1887, a cast iron fountain designed in France was placed in the square.

The dilapidation of the San Juan de Dios Hospital led to its demolition in 1896, when a new hospital, the Provincial Hospital of Pontevedra, was built. After the demolition of the hospital, the businessman Saturnino Varela bought the land in 1897 and erected a new building in eclectic and French style, the Varela Building, on the ground floor of which he opened the Varela hardware store which remained there until 1989. The square became popularly known as Saturno Square. The name was adopted by the people in reference to the owner of the hardware store.

In 1908, the year of his death, the square was named after Curros Enríquez.

In 1924, one of Pontevedra's most emblematic establishments, the Droguería Moderna (a drugstore-pharmacy) was set up in the square. Its owner held the authorisations for the sale of the chemical products sold there. In November 1958 the chain of shops Peral Moda opened to the public.

In December 1986, a monument to Alexandre Bóveda was installed in the square, promoted by the Partido Galleguista and paid for by the people.

In March 1989, the century-old textile shop Almacenes Olmedo closed its doors.

On 18 December 1998, the Casino Mercantil e Industrial de Pontevedra moved into the Varela building, which the company had purchased in April of the same year.

In 2001 the square was completely pedestrianised. In March 2017, the Droguería Moderna closed its doors, as did Peral Moda in December 2018.

== Description ==
It is a very irregular triangular square, pedestrianised like the rest of the historic centre. The Portuguese pilgrimage way passes through the square, going from Soportales street to Real street.

The square is an open paved space. It is mainly dominated by the Varela building. In front of this building there is a central triangular space delimited by some stairs in which there are benches and the sculpture of Alexandre Bóveda. The monument to Alexandre Bóveda, founder of the Partido Galleguista (Galician Nationalist Party) in 1931, was created by the sculptor Alfonso Vilar Lamelas in 1986. It consists of a bronze bust of Alexandre Bóveda and a grey granite pedestal on which are superimposed and sculpted in bronze the insignia and initials of the Partido Galleguista.

In front of the Olmedo building is a cast iron fountain from 1887 of French design, decorated with flowers and shells, four fauns with spouts in their mouths and on top a vase with handles and a lid.

The square has along its west side eight stone benches covered with wood on top and eight orange trees.

== Outstanding buildings ==
On the north side of the square is the Varela Building, designed in 1897. It stands out for the influence of French architecture in its mansard roof. The building was inspired by the Parisian Mansard roofs of the 19th century in grey zinc, which allows for an increase in living space and adapts to the slope of the roofs. The decoration of the mansard window frames and the continuous tabular bossage on the facades is remarkable, as is the symmetry of the multiple balcony doors.

To the south of the square is the Olmedo Building, built in 1886. In the 20th century, its facade was renovated for commercial use on the first two floors and an additional floor was added. The building now has a ground floor and three upper floors. It is made entirely of ashlar and has large shop windows on the lower two floors and balconies with windows and doors on the upper floors.

On the south side, the square is bounded by 18th and 19th century buildings with arcades.

== Gallery ==
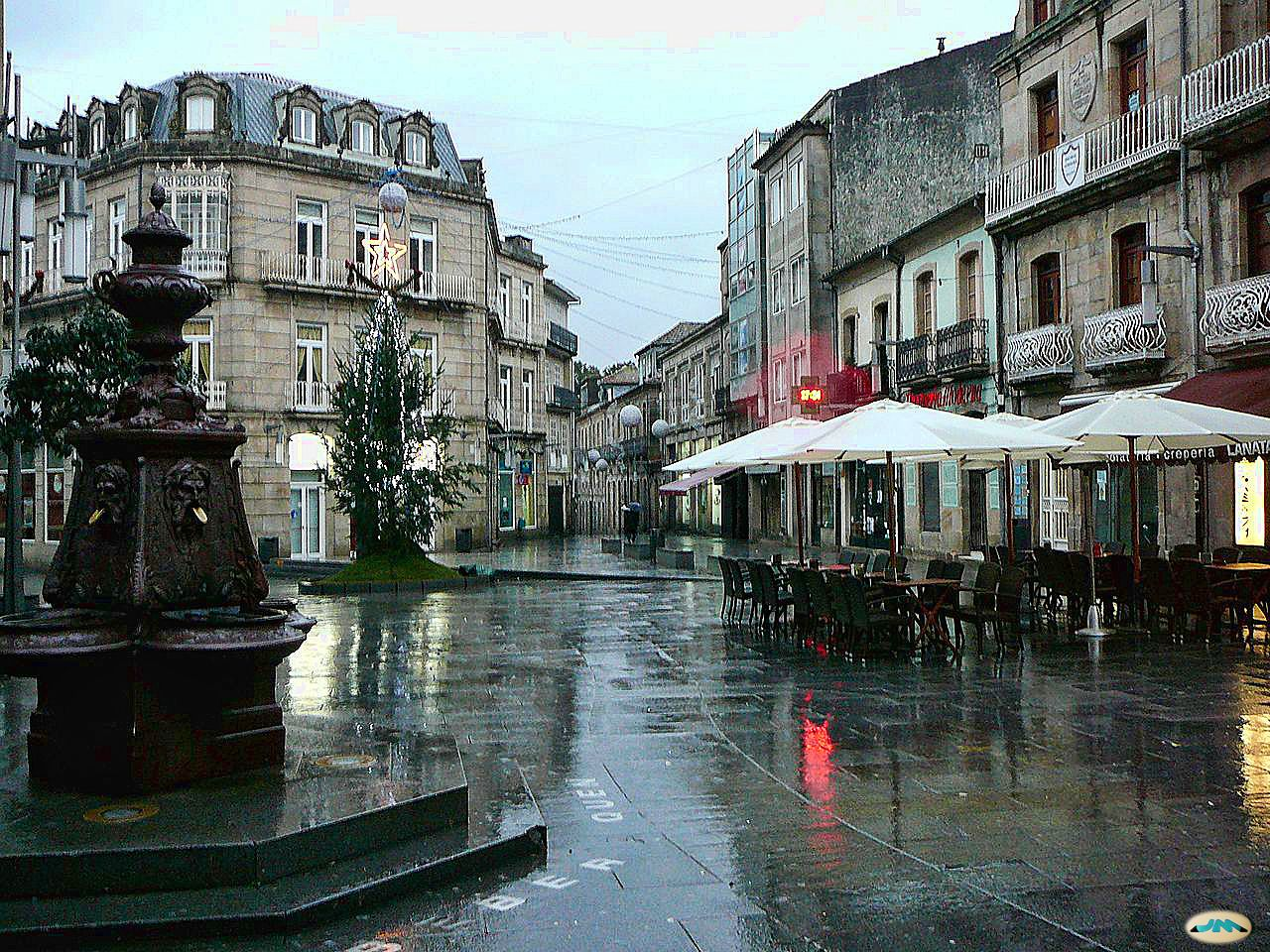
The square in winter

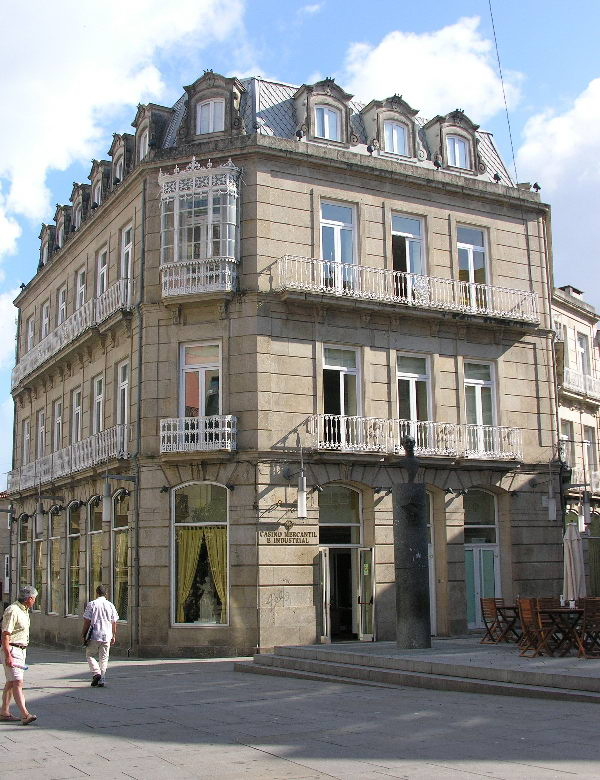
Varela building, mansard roof

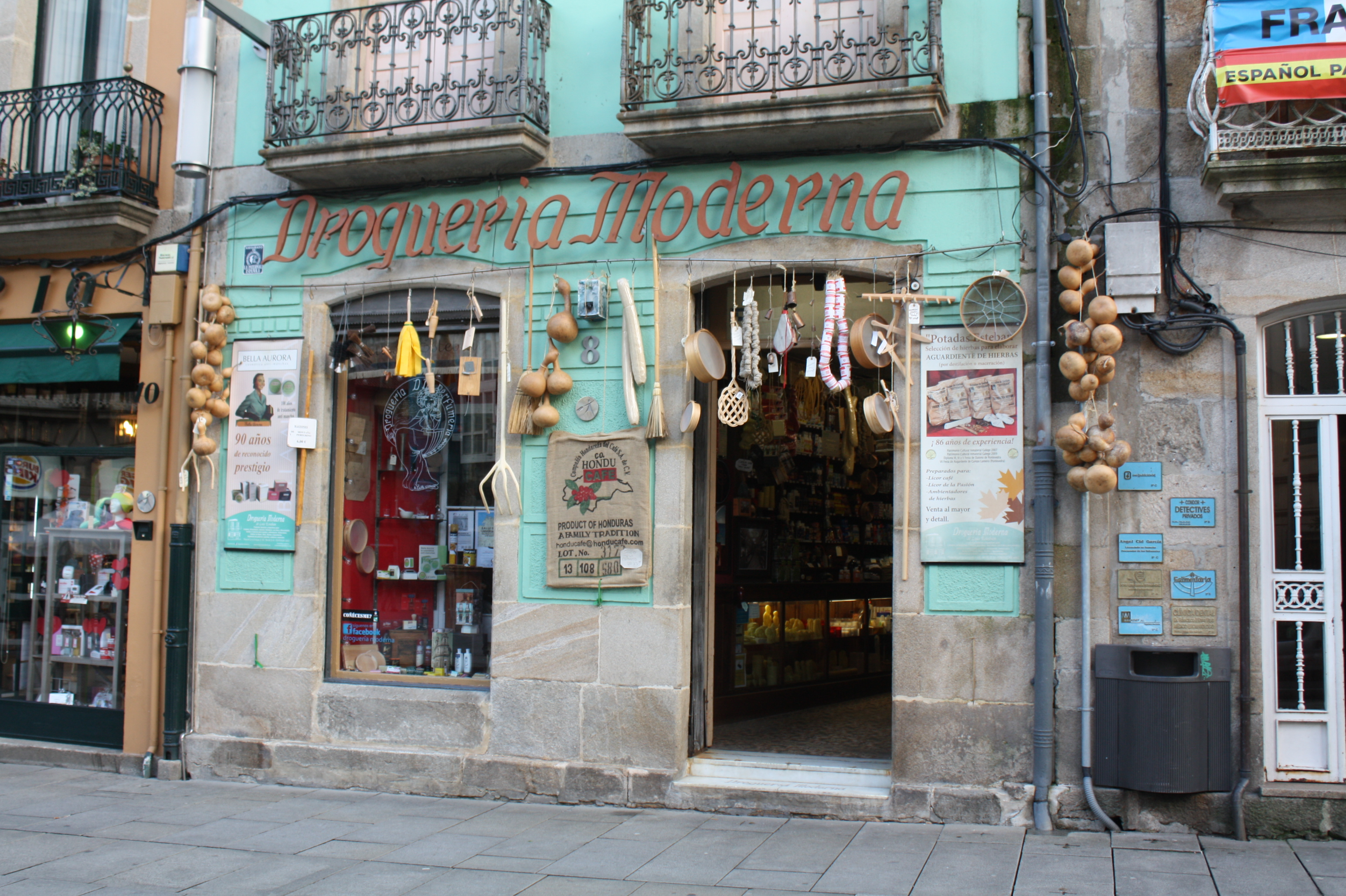
Former Modern Drugstore

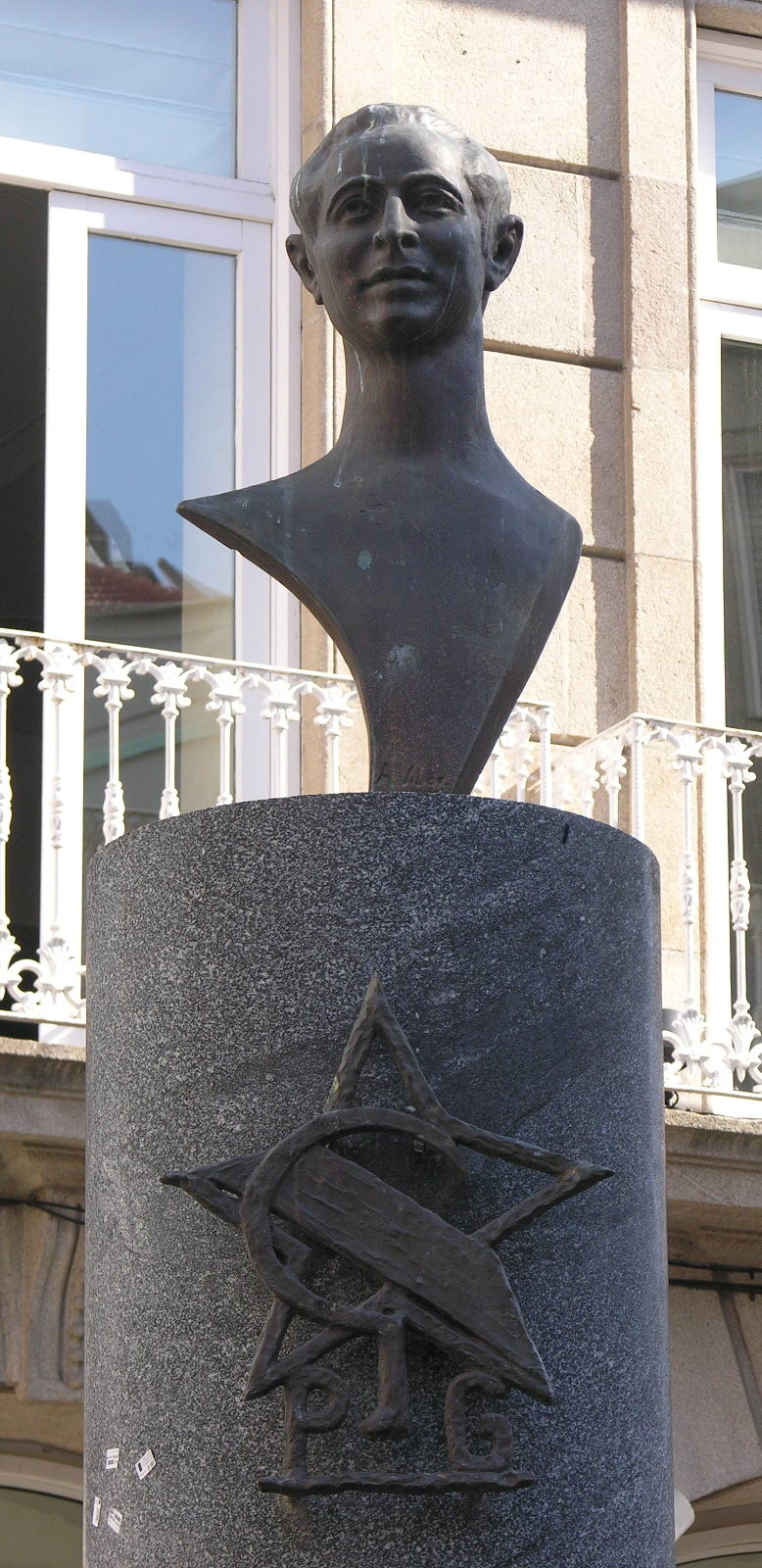
Monument to Alexandre Bóveda

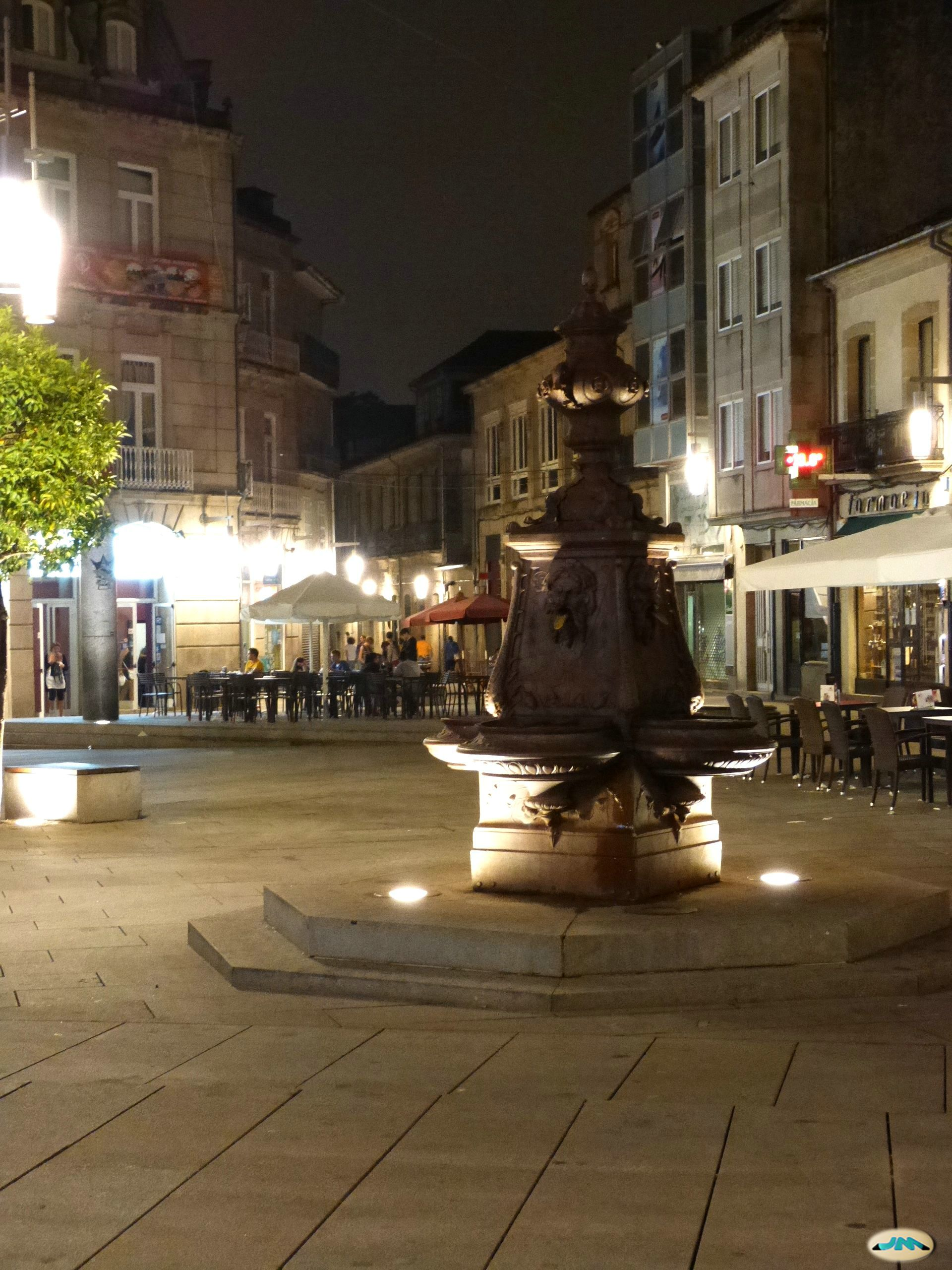
Wrought iron fountain from the 19th century

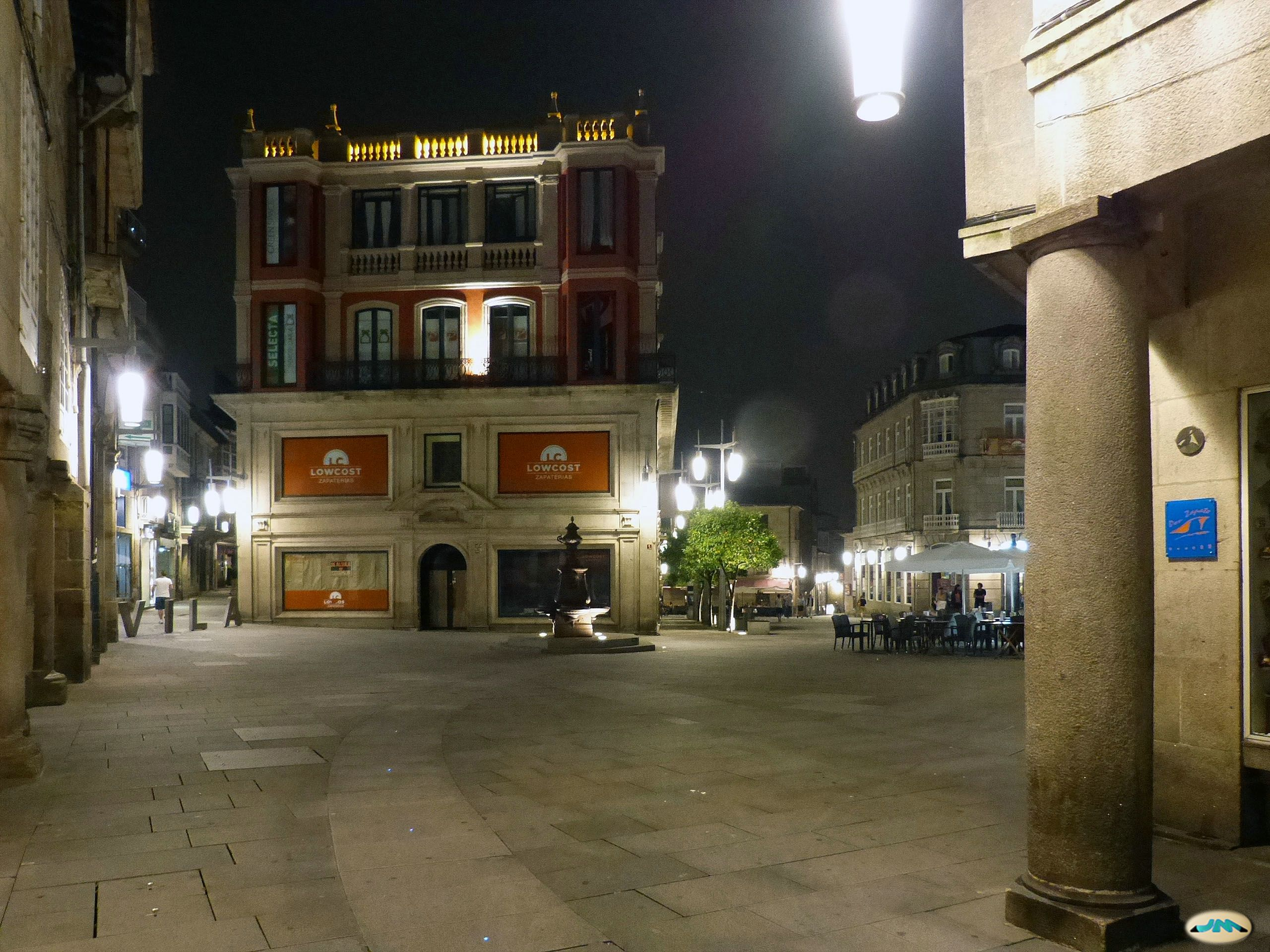
Olmedo building in the background

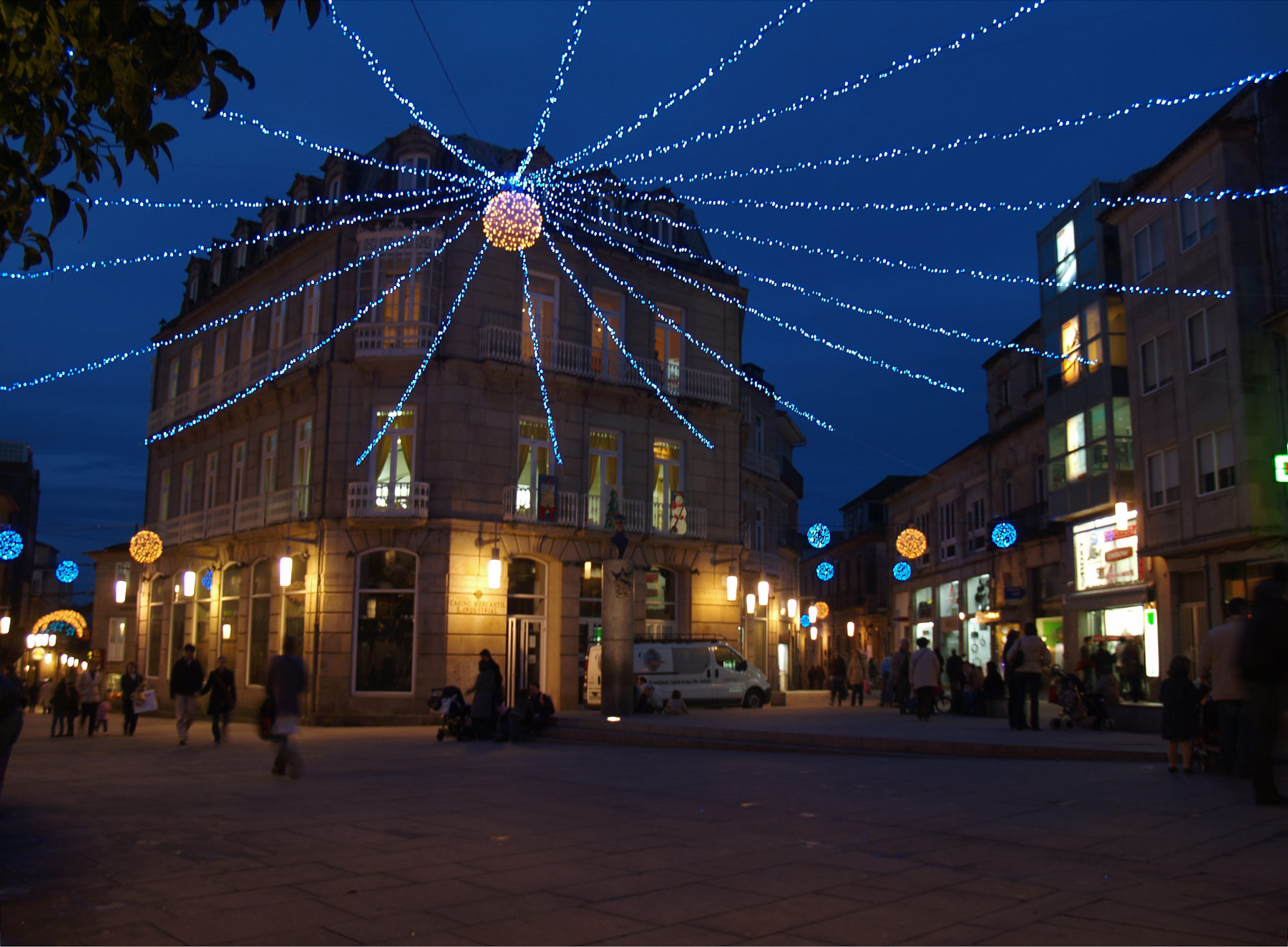
The square at night

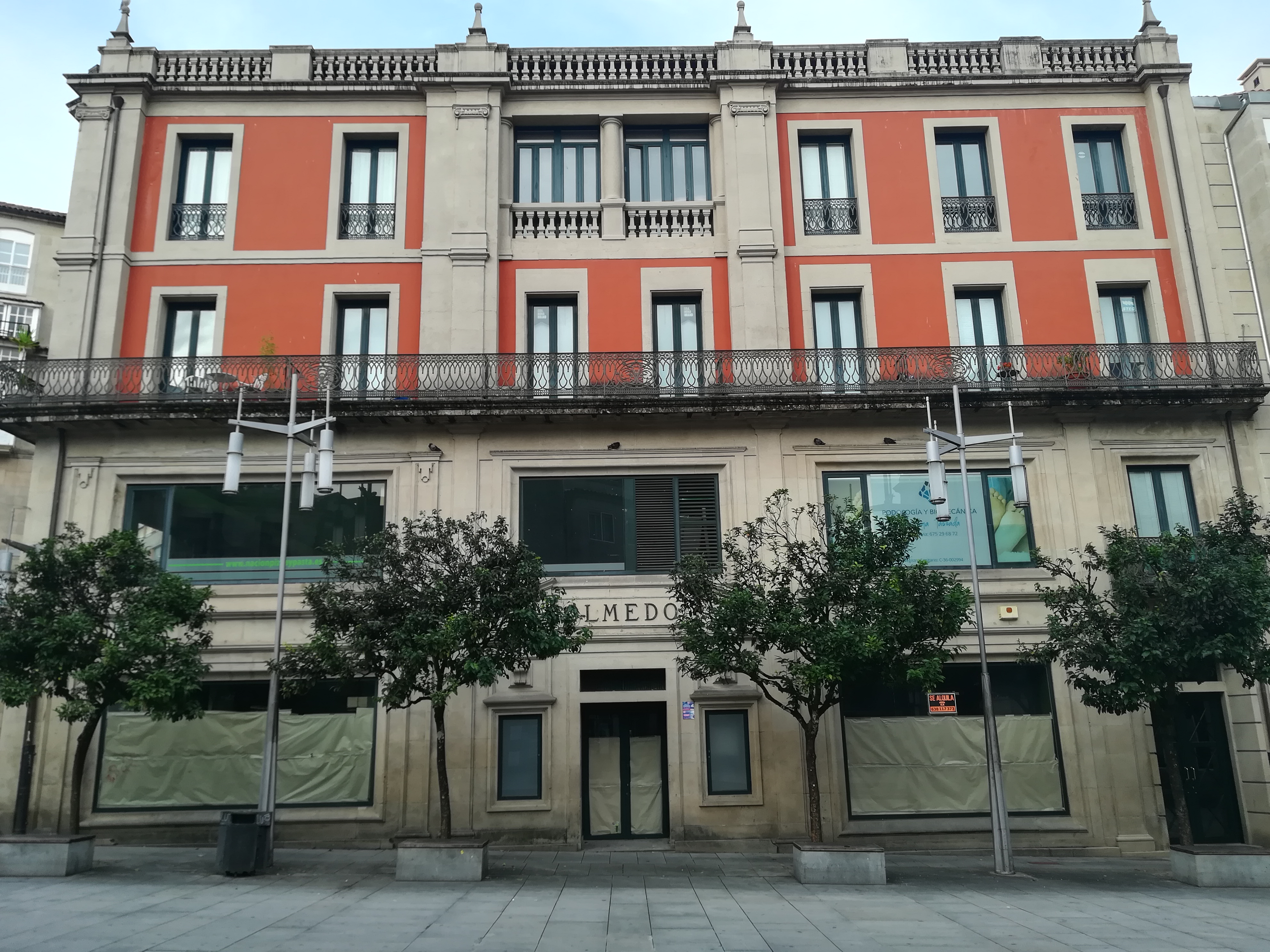
Olmedo Building

== See also ==
=== Bibliography ===
- Aganzo, Carlos (2010). Pontevedra. Ciudades con encanto (in Spanish). Madrid: El País-Aguilar. p. 82. ISBN 978-8403509344.p. 43.
- Blanco Dios, Jaime Bernardo; Castro González, Amancio (2010). As árbores da cidade de Pontevedra (in Galician). Pontevedra: Concello de Pontevedra. p. 82. ISBN 978-84-606-5147-5.
- Fontoira Surís, Rafael (2009). Pontevedra Monumental (in Galician). Pontevedra: Diputación de Pontevedra. p. 531. ISBN 9788484573272. p. 434-435; 510; 530.
- Nieto González, Remigio (1980). Pontevedra. Guía monumental ilustrada (in Spanish). Pontevedra: Asociación de comerciantes de la calle Manuel Quiroga. p. 26.
- Riveiro Tobío, Elvira (2008). Descubrir Pontevedra (in Spanish). Pontevedra: Edicións do Cumio. ISBN 9788482890852. p. 30.

=== Related articles ===
- Old town of Pontevedra
- Chapel of the Holy Souls

=== External links ===
- on the website Xunta de Galicia Tourism
- on the website Ocio en Galicia.
