= Chapel of the Holy Souls in Purgatory (Pontevedra) =

Gothic Revival chapel in Pontevedra, Spain

Chapel of the Holy Souls
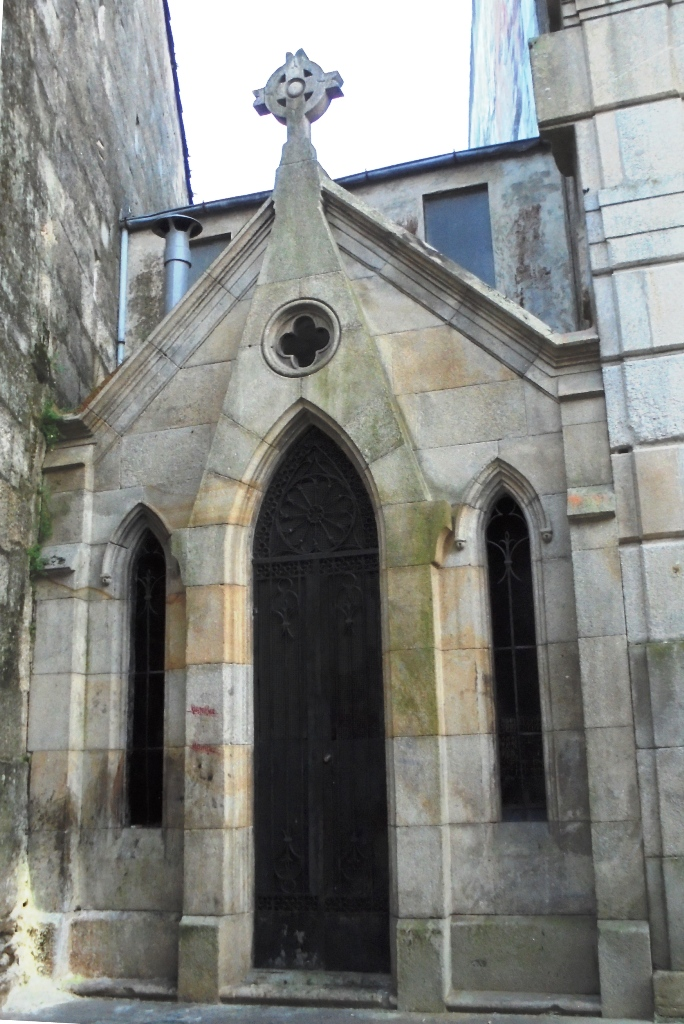
- Facade of the chapel
- Chapel of the Holy Souls
- 42°25′56″N 8°38′41″W
- Location: Pontevedra, Spain
- Country: Spain
- Denomination: Catholicism

Architecture
- Completed: 1898

Administration
- Diocese: Roman Catholic Archdiocese of Santiago de Compostela

The Chapel of the Holy Souls in Purgatory is a small neo-Gothic Catholic religious building located in the old town of Pontevedra (Spain), in Ánimas Street, near Curros Enríquez Square.

== History ==
The chapel is located on a small part of the site where the old hospital of Pontevedra used to be, which operated since the 15th century under the name of Corpus Christi and later St. John of God, the order that ran it.

This hospital had a cemetery, a church and an altar for the souls in Purgatory attached to it. The complex was demolished in 1896 when the city's new hospital, the Provincial Hospital of Pontevedra, was built. Faced with the loss of this centuries-old spiritual reference, the neighbours decided to ask for the construction of a small chapel where they could continue the tradition of their ancestors. Thus, under pressure from the neighbours, this small neo-Gothic chapel was built in 1898.

== Description ==
The chapel is dedicated to the souls in purgatory for whom alms are offered for their salvation, so that they may attain happiness in heaven.

The façade of the chapel, in neo-Gothic style and of small dimensions, is situated between party walls. It has a door with a pointed arch, accompanied by two windows with pointed arches on either side.

Above the entrance door is a small opening in the shape of a four-leaf clover framed by a circle, representing a lobed cross. At the top, the chapel is crowned by a cross within a circle.

Inside, there is a two-tiered polychrome wooden altarpiece with a total of six figures, depicted amidst flames, the central ones being a bishop and a king.

== Gallery ==
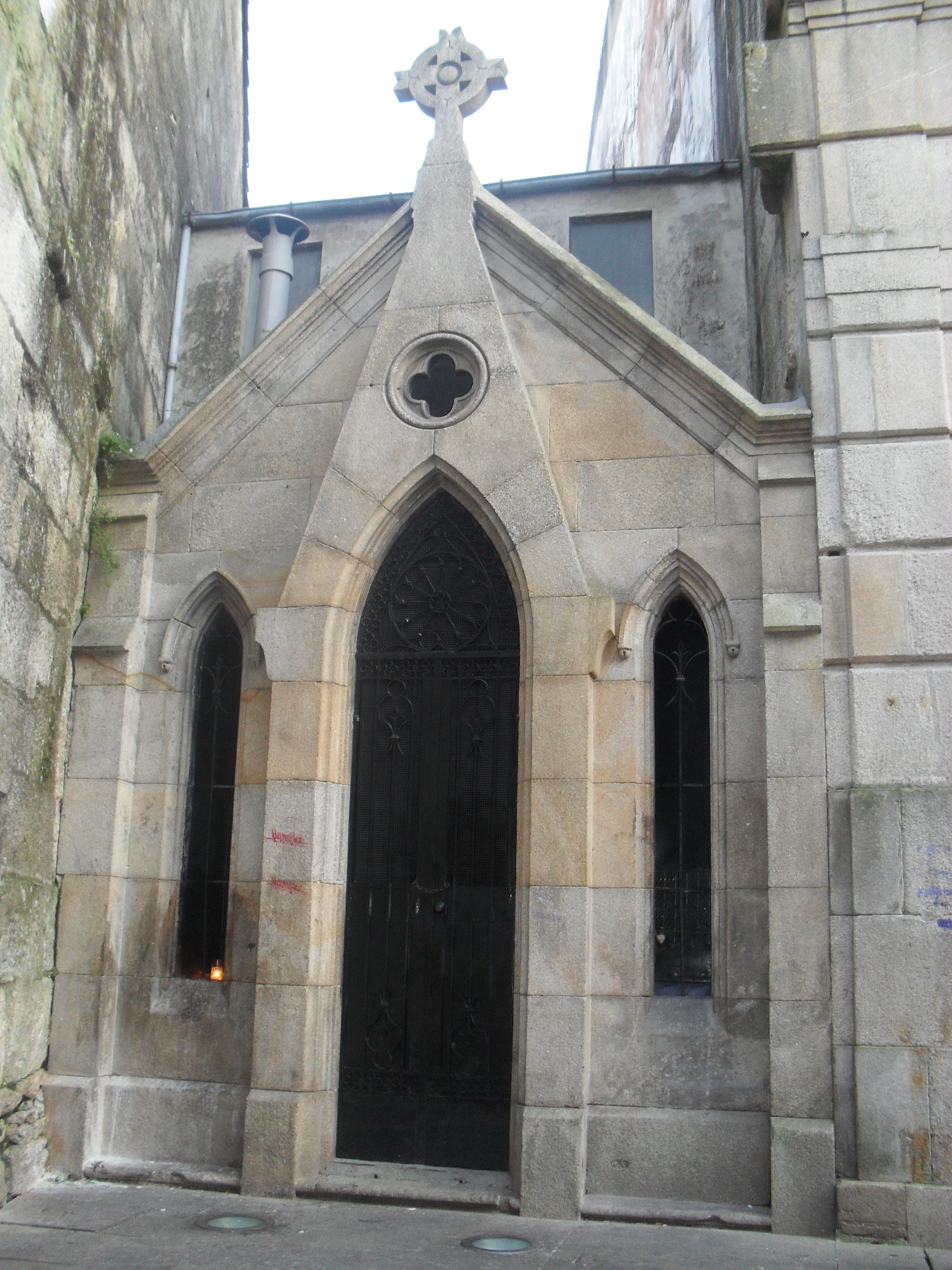
Façade of the chapel

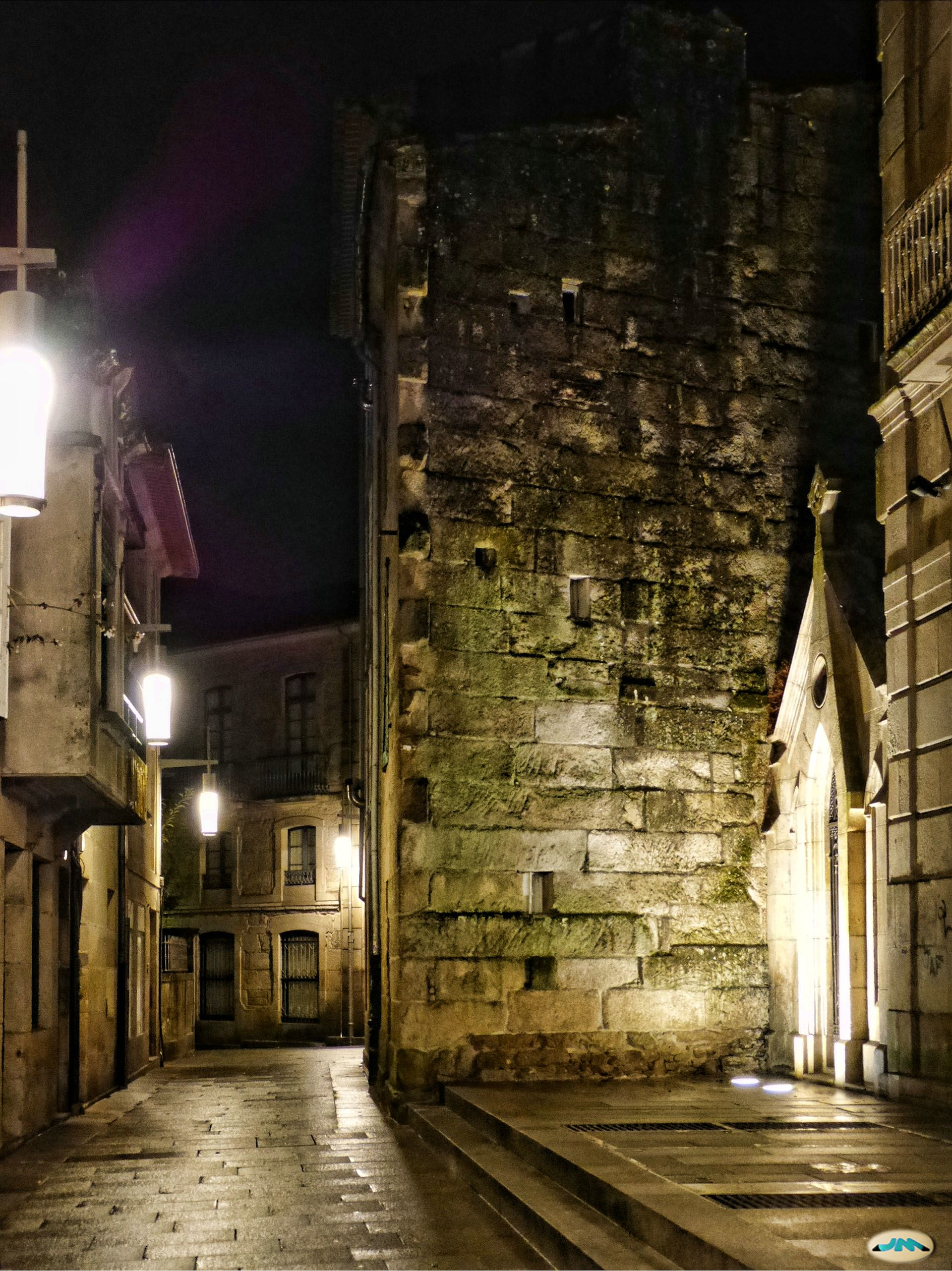
The chapel in Ánimas Street

== External Sources ==
- Fontoira Surís, Rafael (2009). Pontevedra monumental (in Galician). Pontevedra: Diputación de Pontevedra. p. 405. ISBN 978-84-8457-327-2.
- Riveiro Tobío, Elvira (2008). Descubrir Pontevedra (in Spanish). Pontevedra: Edicións do Cumio. p. 30. ISBN 9788482890852.

== See also ==
- Gothic Revival architecture
- Plaza de Curros Enríquez
