= Canción del pirata =

Spanisch poem

Canción del pirata (The Song of the Pirate) is a poem by the Spanish Romantic poet José de Espronceda (1808–1842). It was first published in 1835 in the journal El Artista, and later included in the collection Poesías (1840). The poem is considered one of the most representative and influential works of Spanish Romanticism.

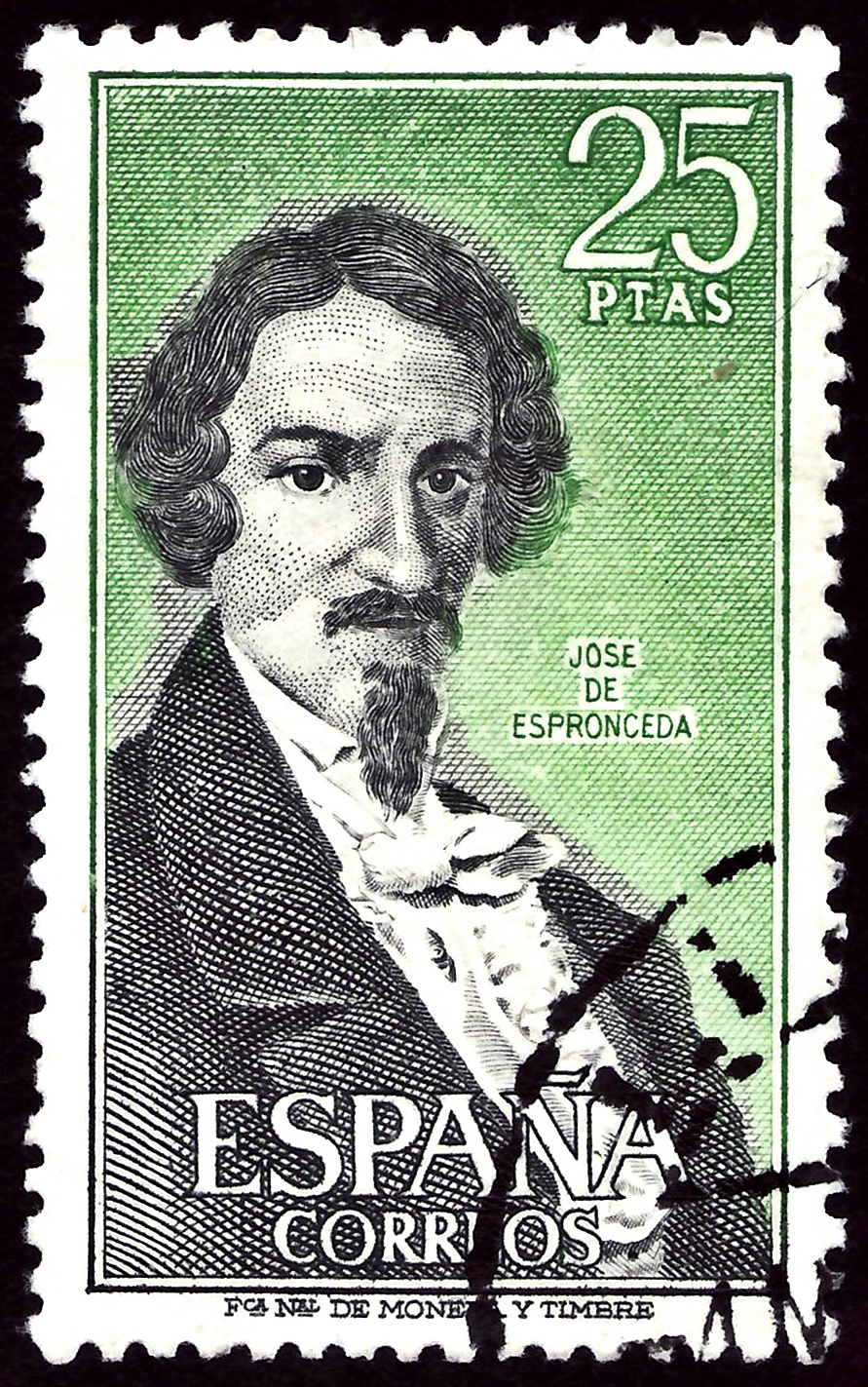
José de Espronceda (Stamp of Spain; 1972)

== Content ==
The poem portrays a pirate as a literary figure who exists outside the boundaries of society and rejects social conventions as well as material wealth. Freedom is presented as the protagonist's supreme value and central ideal.

Structurally, the poem employs three distinct rhyme schemes (cabeza, estrofas, and estribillo). It is influenced by Le chant des pirates (1827), a poem by the French writer Louis Marie Fontan. However, the Hispanist Robert Marrast has argued that its principal model was L'ami de la tempête, an adaptation of the opening song of Lord Byron's The Corsair (1814), composed between 1821 and 1826 and published by M. de Lourdoueix. Despite these literary antecedents, critics generally agree that Espronceda's poem surpasses its sources in originality and expressive power.

In his Canciones (Songs), José de Espronceda, the main representative of Spanish Romanticism, chooses individuals on the margins of society (pirates, beggars, executioners, condemned men, Cossacks) and turns them into spokespersons who criticize conservative society. These protagonists correspond to the image of the romantic hero who rebels against society.

The Biographical Dictionary of Ancient, Medieval, and Modern Freethinkers says of the Spanish poet:

He was put in jail for writing rebellious poetry at the age of 14 and spent most of his life in exile. At Paris he fought in the 1830 rebellion and was back in Spain for the 1840 rebellion. He then became on of the most popular poets in Spain, freely expressing his deistic opinions in some of his poems. (Cancion de pirata, etc.)

== See also ==
- Casa de las Campanas (Legend)
- Canto a Teresa

== Bibliography ==
- Obras poéticas completas de D. José de Espronceda (1876) de José de Espronceda
