= Casa de los Vaamonde =

Gothic and Renaissance house in Pontevedra, Spain

- Casa dos Vaamonde
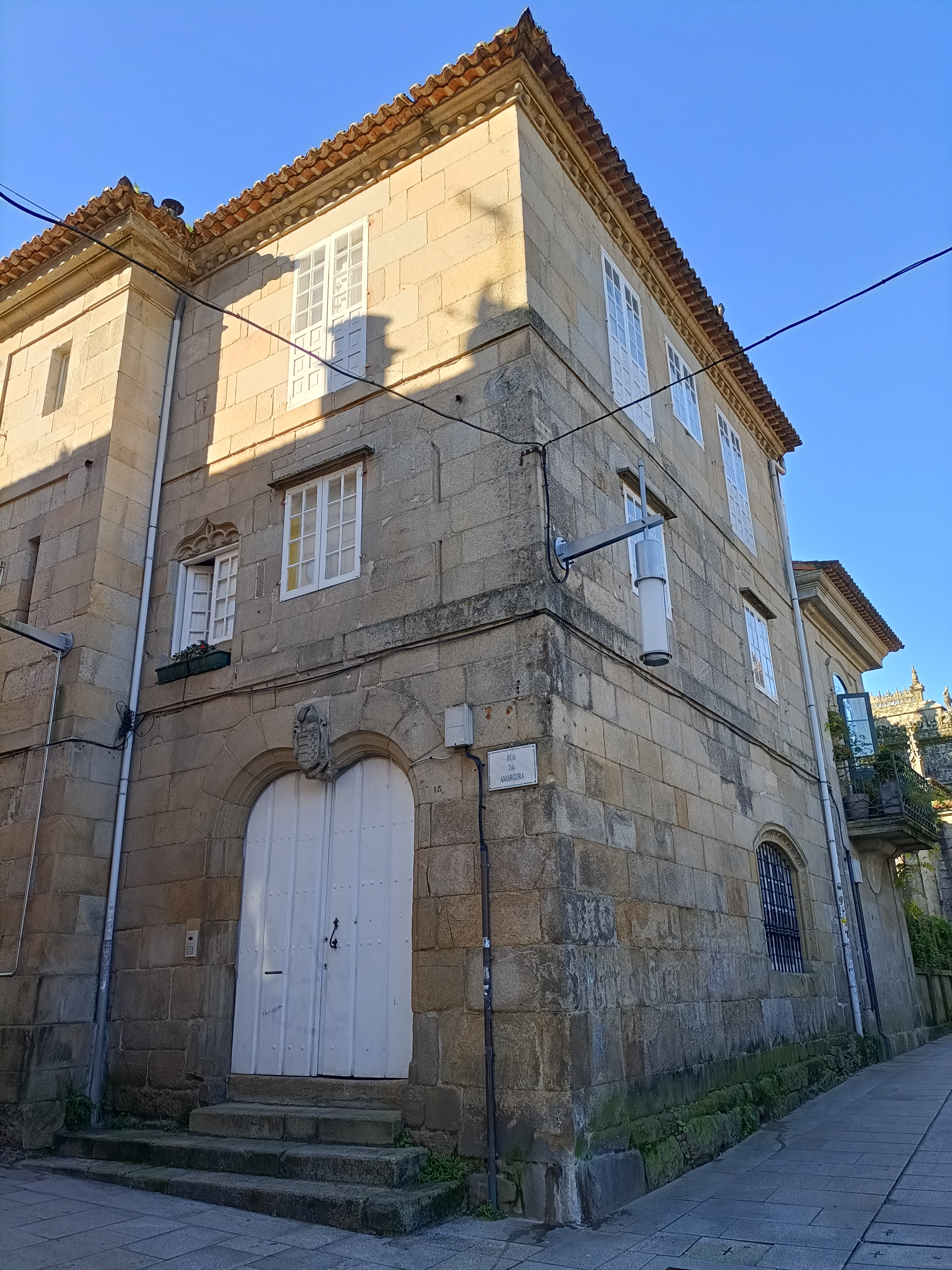
- Interactive map of the Casa de los Vaamonde area
- Former names: Antiguo Cuartel de Carabineros
- Alternative names: Casa de los Baamonde

General information
- Type: House
- Location: Pontevedra, Galicia, Spain
- Coordinates: 42°26′02″N 8°38′49″W
- Completed: 1500
- Owner: Private property

Technical details
- Floor count: 3
- Floor area: 179 m2

The Casa de los Vaamonde, also known as the Old Carabineros Barracks, is a Gothic-Renaissance house located in the historic centre of the Spanish city of Pontevedra.

== Location ==
The house is located on the corner of Amargura and Isabel II streets, in the upper western part of the old town, close to the Basilica of Saint Mary Major.

== History ==
This noble house is one of the oldest civil buildings in the city. It originally belonged to the Vaamonde or Ba(h)amonde family and was built between the end of the 15th century and the beginning of the 16th century, around 1500. It was built in one of the most important locations in the city at the time, on the corner of the main street known as Açougue Street (now Isabel II Street).

The Vaamonde family spread from the north of Galicia to the rest of the Iberian Peninsula and, in Pontevedra, was linked to important lineages.

Only part of the original, larger noble house remains, which in the 15th century occupied the space between Eirado de Santa María and Amargura street. In the 19th century, the house was the Carabineros barracks and the headquarters of the Pontevedra Carabineros, whose original function was to guard the coast and borders. In the 20th century, in the 1950s, the house was used as a primary school.

== Description ==
The house consists of a ground floor and two upper floors corresponding to three sections demarcated by horizontal bands of granite. On the main façade, the entrance door is preceded by three stone steps. It features an ogee two-lobed arch with a small coat of arms divided in two in the keystone. The left half of the coat of arms (which features a helmet with a plume of a single feather) is decorated with a band of eight orders corresponding to an unknown lineage and the other half with a band of three and nine orders, the original coat of arms of the Vaamonde family.

On this facade, there are two windows on the first floor, the one on the left with an ogee arch on a lintel and decorated with interlace, and another window with a balcony on the upper section. On the Isabel II Street side facade, there is a window with a segmental arch decorated with fleurons on the ground floor, two other windows on the first floor and three others (including two balconies) on the upper floor.

The cornice at the top of the façades is decorated with stone half-spheres or balls, a typical feature of Renaissance architecture in Pontevedra, which can also be seen on the cornice of the Casa de las Campanas.

The coat of arms of the neighbouring house also bears the Vaamonde family coat of arms, as well as those of the Mariño family (three waves) and the Andrade and Menelao families (an eagle).

== Gallery ==
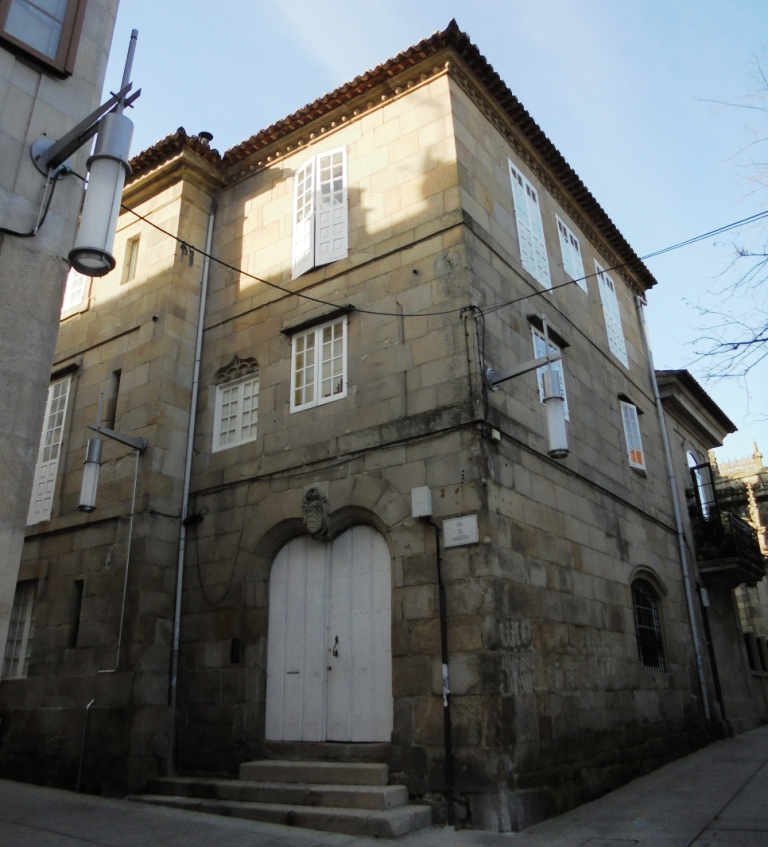
Façades

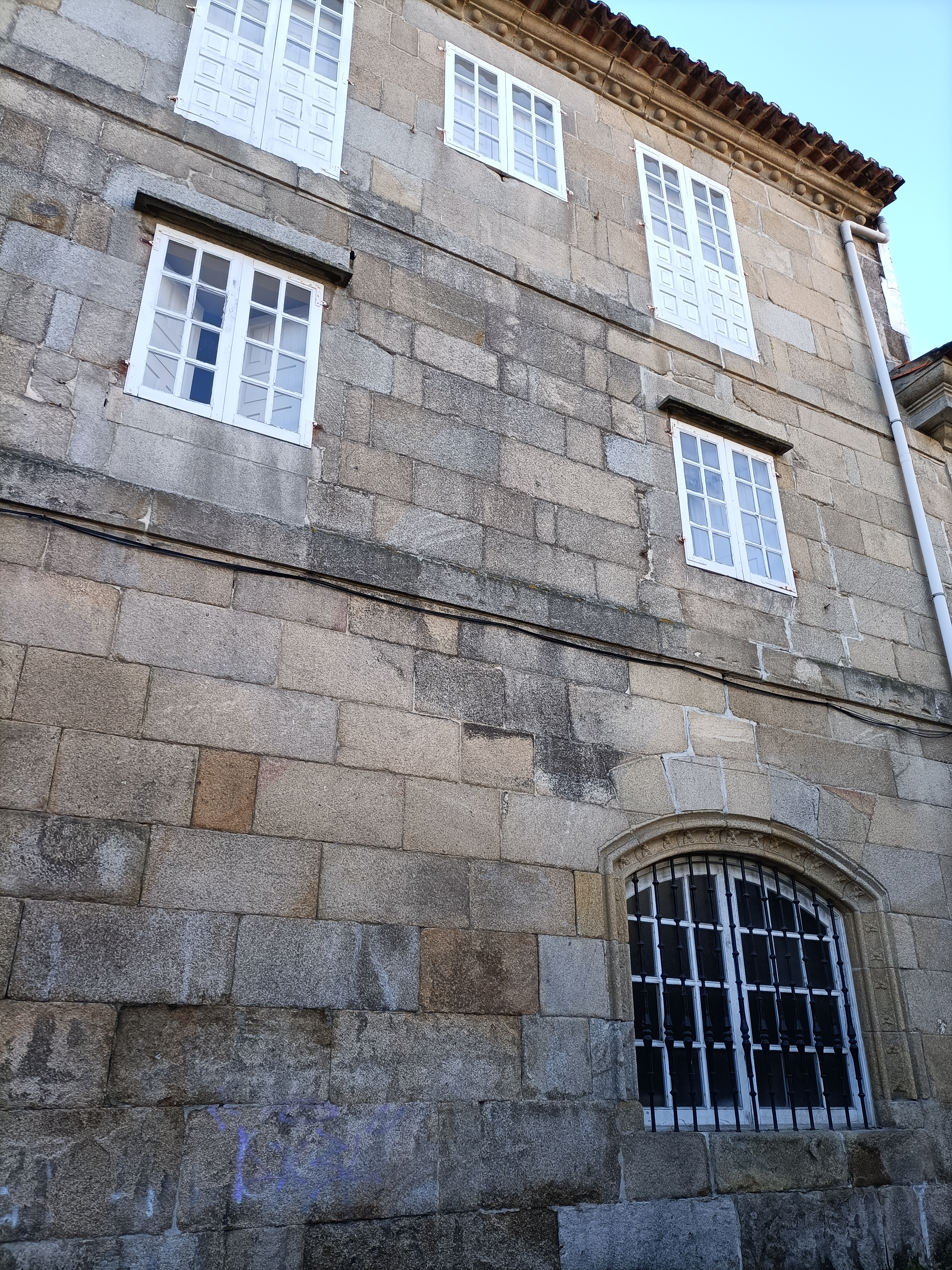
Side façade of the Vaamonde House

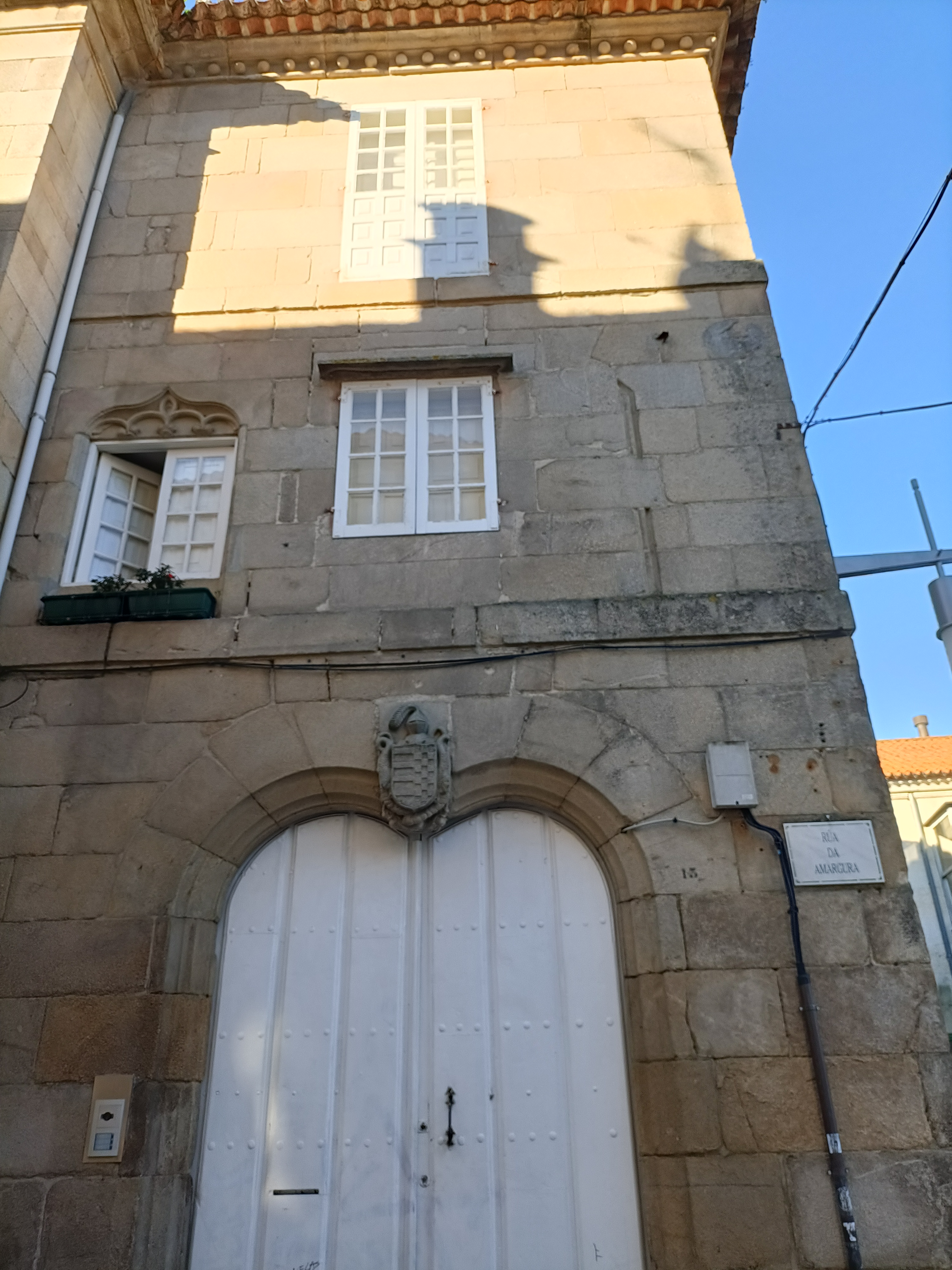
Façade with window with ogee arch decorated with interlace

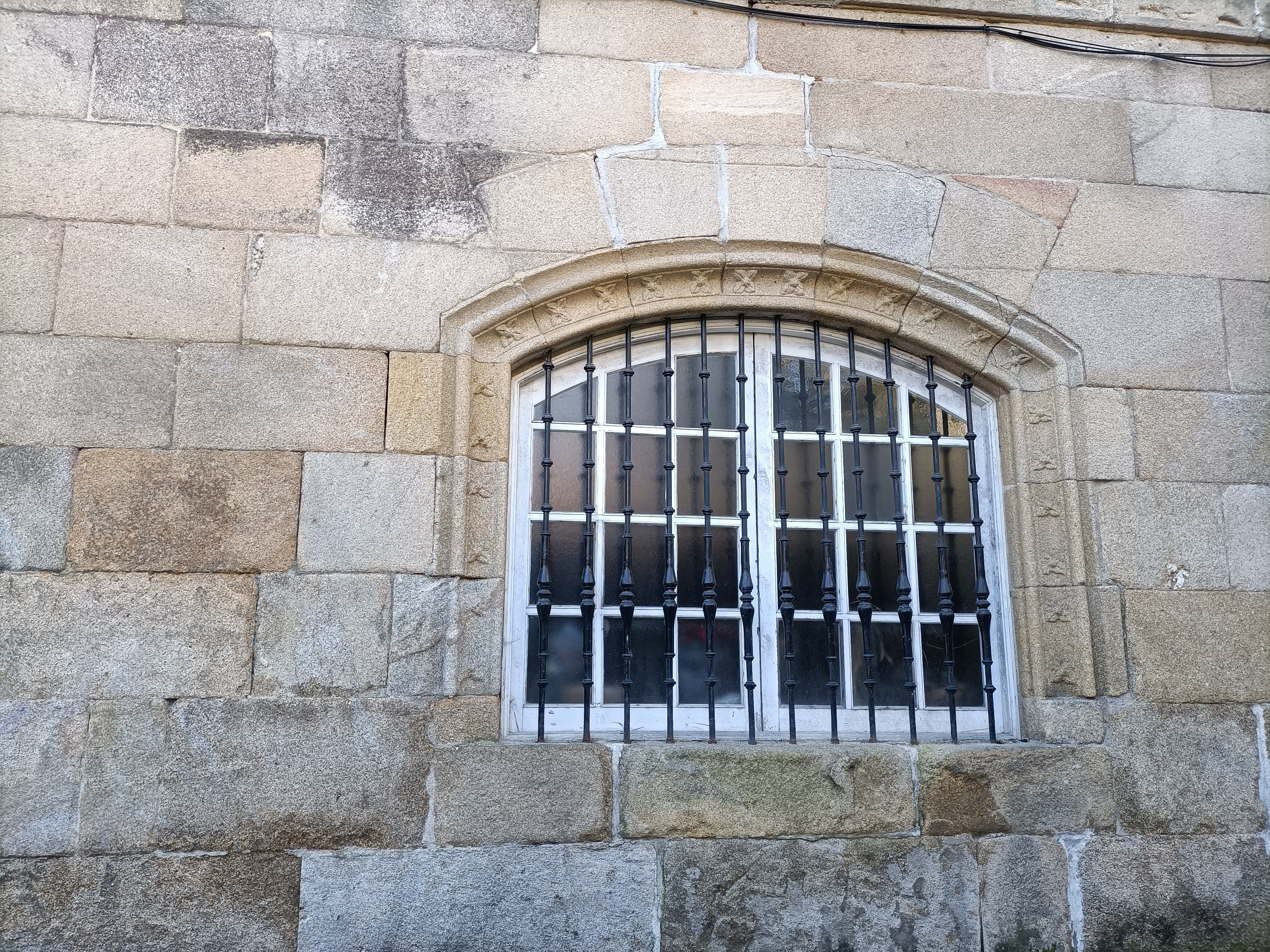
Window with its fleuron decoration

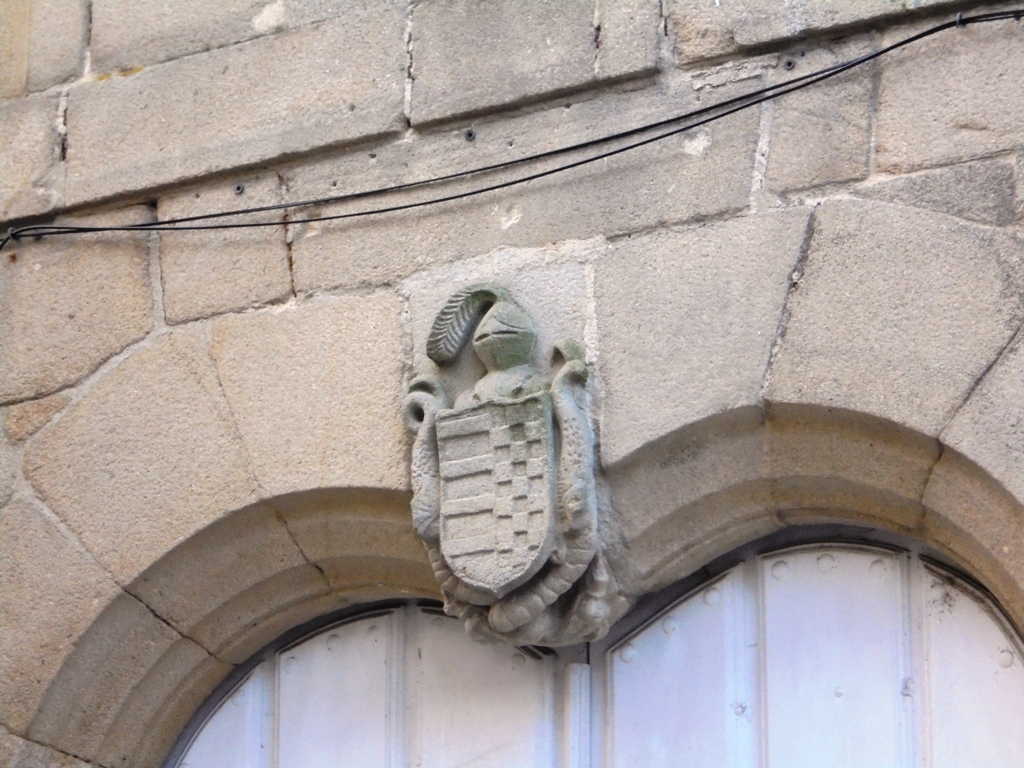
Coat of arms of Vaamonde House

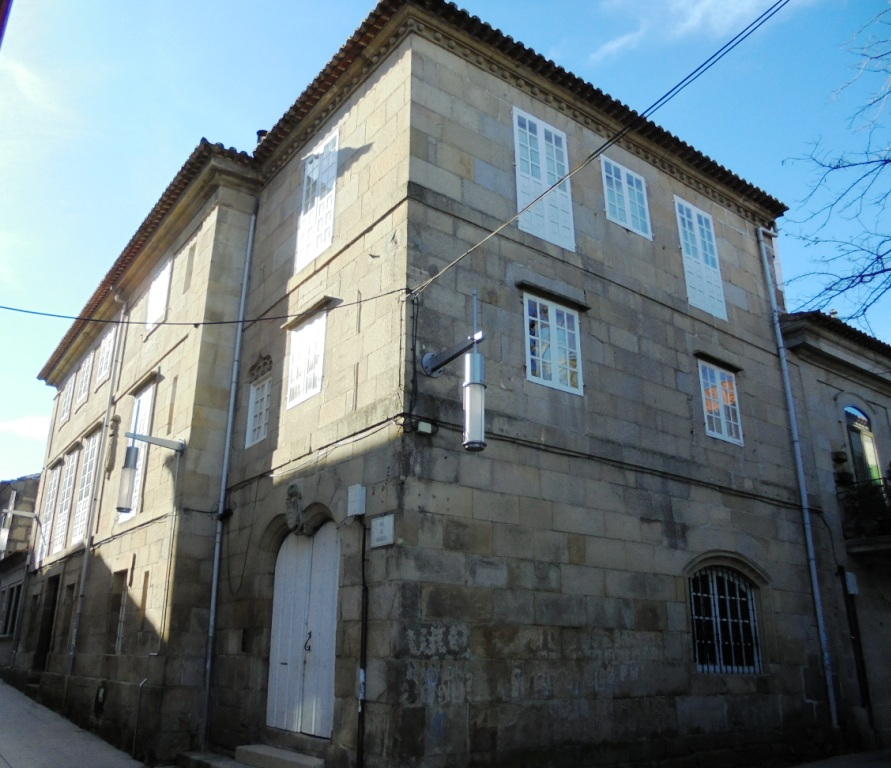
Side facade of the Vaamonde house

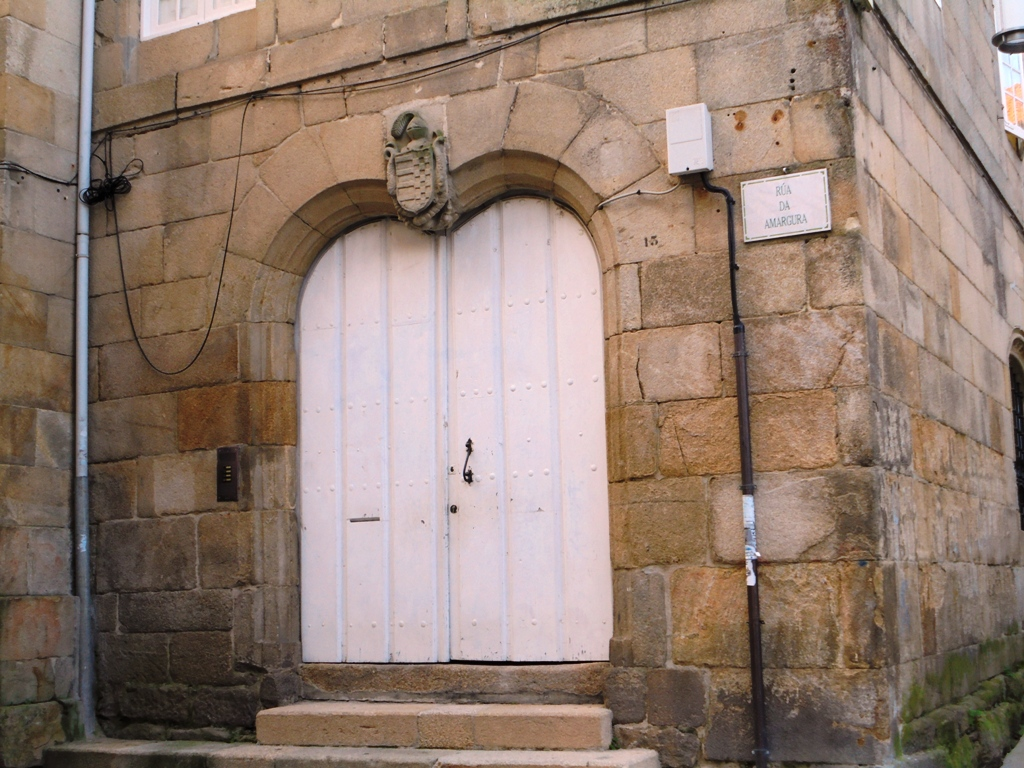
Renaissance façade

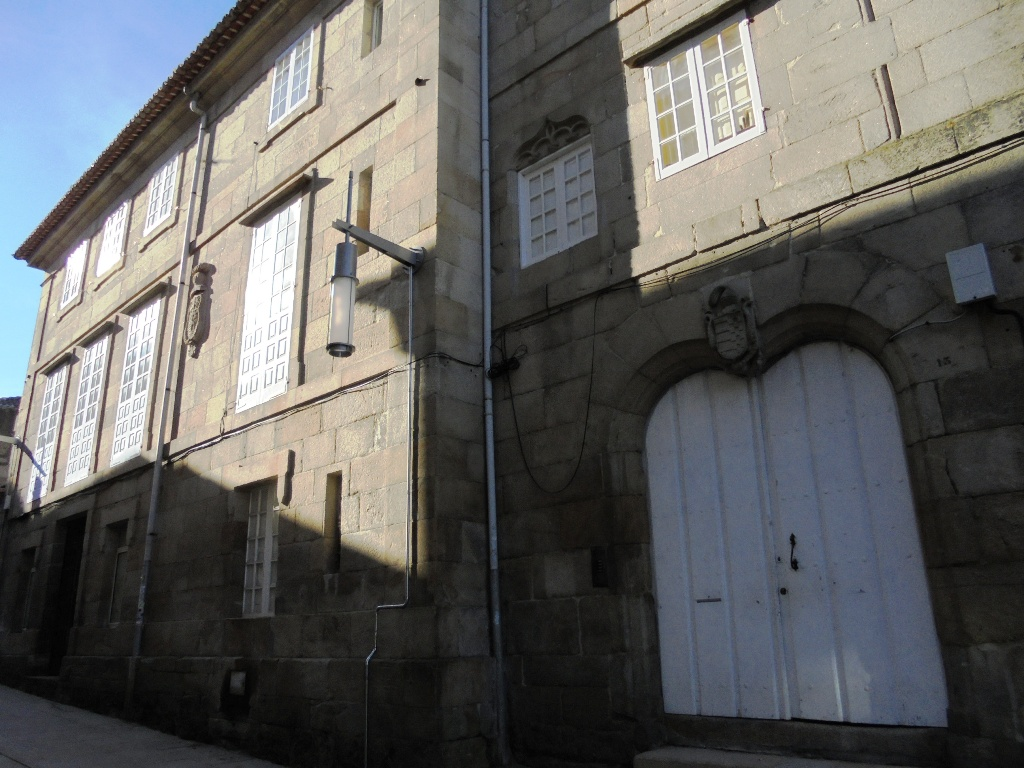
Main facade adjoining the neighbouring house

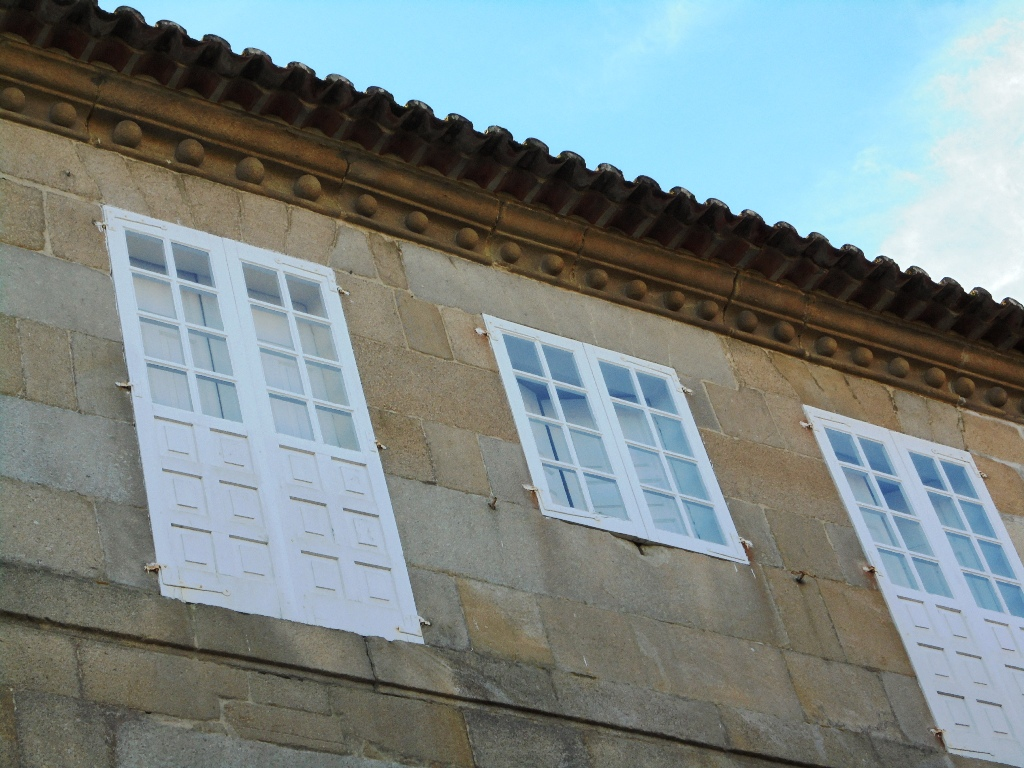
Renaissance decoration shaped like balls on the upper part of one of the façades

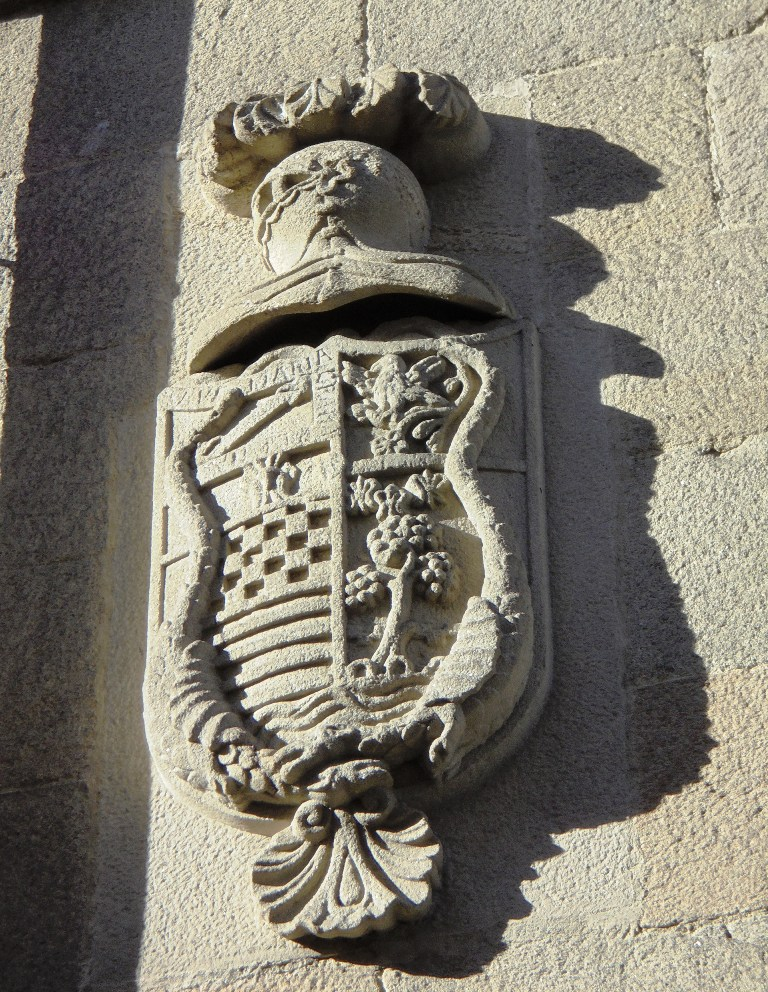
Coat of arms of the adjoining house

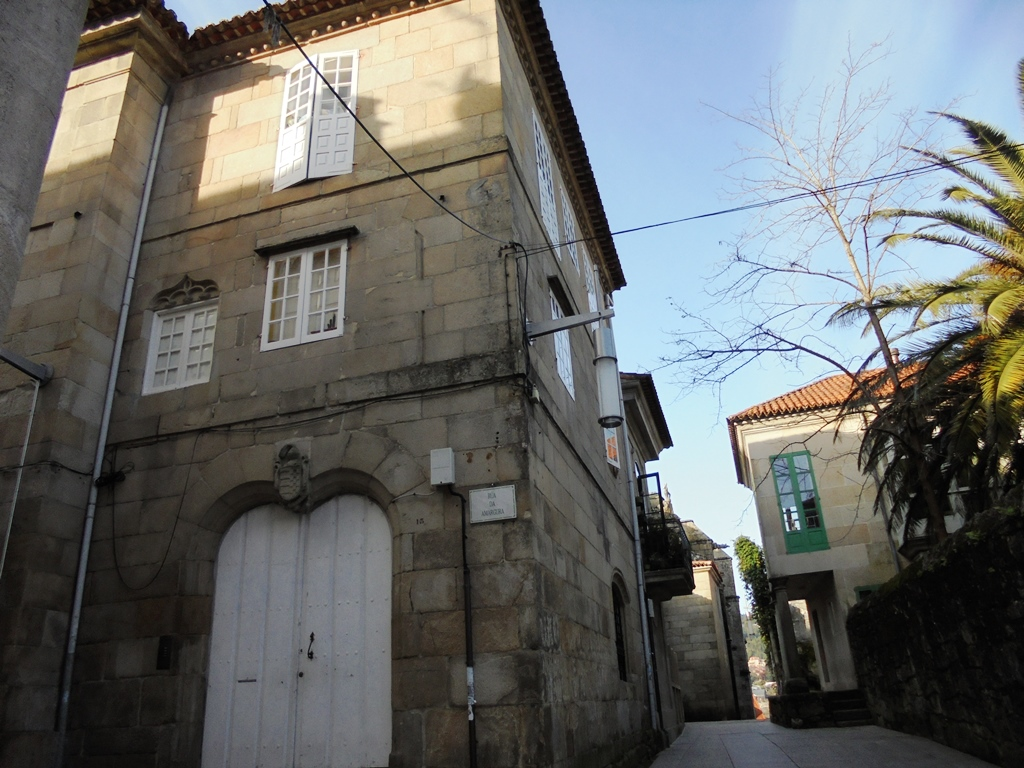
Main façade

== See also ==
=== Bibliography ===
- Fontoira Surís, Rafael (2009). Pontevedra monumental (in Galician). Pontevedra: Diputación de Pontevedra. p. 224. ISBN 9788484573272.
- Messia de la Cerda y Pita, Luis F. (1989). Heráldica, escudos de armas labrados en piedra existentes en la zona de Pontevedra (in Spanish). Pontevedra: Diputación de Pontevedra. pp. 337–340. ISBN 848684522X.
- Nieto González, Remigio (1980). Pontevedra. Guía monumental ilustrada (in Spanish). Pontevedra: Asociación de comerciantes de la calle Manuel Quiroga. p. 32.
- Riveiro Tobío, Elvira (2008). Descubrir Pontevedra (in Spanish). Pontevedra: Edicións do Cumio. p. 27. ISBN 9788482890852.

=== Related articles ===
- Old Town of Pontevedra
- Casa de las Campanas
- Casa del Correo Viejo

=== External links ===
- Casa de los Vaamonde or Antiguo cuartel de Carabineros on the website Patrimonio Galego
