= Casa de las Campanas =

Gothic house in Pontevedra, Spain

- Casa das Campás
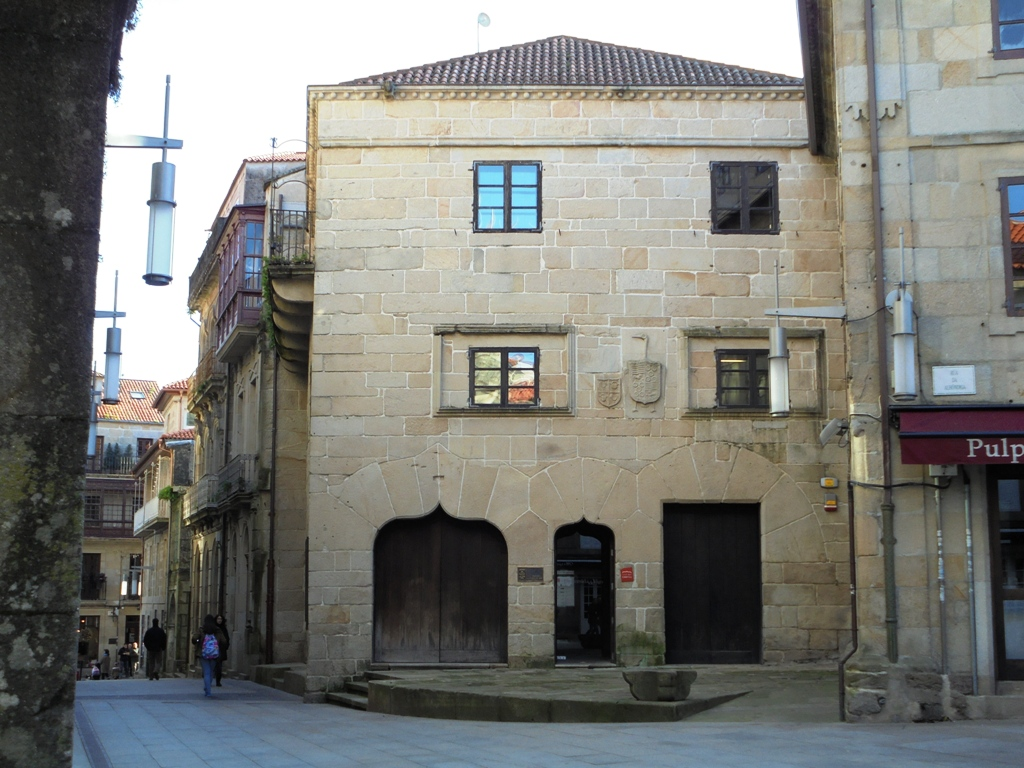
- Interactive map of the Casa de las Campanas area

General information
- Type: House
- Location: Pontevedra, Galicia, Spain
- Coordinates: 42°25′56.2″N 8°38′46.3″W
- Construction started: 15th century
- Completed: 16th century
- Owner: Pontevedra City Council
- Governing body: Pontevedra City Council

Technical details
- Floor count: 3

Website
- www.visit-pontevedra.com/es/que-ver/imprescindibles/casa-das-campas

The Casa de las Campanas (translated as House of the Bells) is one of the three oldest buildings in the city of Pontevedra in Spain, and perhaps the oldest civil building. It is located in Don Filiberto street, at number 11, in the old town.

== History ==
Due to the lack of documentation, its origins are not clear, but it is thought to belong to the late Middle Ages if we take into account the coat of arms on the façade and the style of the doors. These coats of arms link it to the lineage of the García Camba family or, more probably, to that of the Pugas, lords of Regodeigón in Ribadavia.

The first existing reference to the Casa de las Campanas dates from 1587. At that time, the building was located next to the church of Saint Bartholomew the Elder, which for unknown reasons did not have a bell. For this reason, the bells of the Puga house were used to call the parishioners, which at that time already belonged to the Benedictine monks of the San Salvador de Lérez monastery. The monks also used the Casa de las Campanas as a wine cellar, where they could store about 12,000 litres.

In the 20th century, in the post-war years, the house was known as the Bar Pitillo because on the ground floor there was an establishment where customers were offered tobacco. In the 1980s the building was in a poor state of repair until it was acquired by the Pontevedra City Council in 2000 with the aim of refurbishing it. After a careful renovation it opened in 2003.

Since 2006, the Casa de las Campanas has been the seat of the university's rectorate. The house also hosts conferences, exhibitions, courses, workshops and book presentations., In 2017, around 380 events took place there. Especially in summer, the Casa de las Campanas becomes a place for tourists to visit.

== Description ==
It is a late gothic building whose authorship may be attributed to a master who worked on the construction of the Basilica of Saint Mary Major.

On the outside, the house retains the 15th century façade with two ogee arches over the doors. The two windows on the first floor have upper and lower transoms to accommodate sliding shutters, a typical feature of 16th century architecture, as well as the stone balls that decorate the cornice. Between the windows on the first floor there are two coats of arms carved in stone, the smaller one with the arms of the Puga family (spurs and cauldrons) and the larger one with a heron, typical of the arms of the García-Camba family.

Inside the 1,400 m^{2} (15,000 sq ft) building, stone, almost black wood reminiscent of galleons and glass coexist in a careful renovation that gives a modern touch. This university headquarters has an entrance hall or exhibition hall on the ground floor, an office room, a technology room, a conference room and offices for the rector, area directors and New Cinemas on the upper two floors.

== Legend ==
During the 19th and 20th centuries, it was rumoured that the treasure of Benito Soto, the pirate of Pontevedra, was hidden in the house. Benito Soto was the last pirate of the Atlantic, the man who is said to have inspired the poet José de Espronceda (1808-1842) for his poem "Pirate's Song": Pirate ship called, because of its bravery, the Fearful.

== Gallery ==
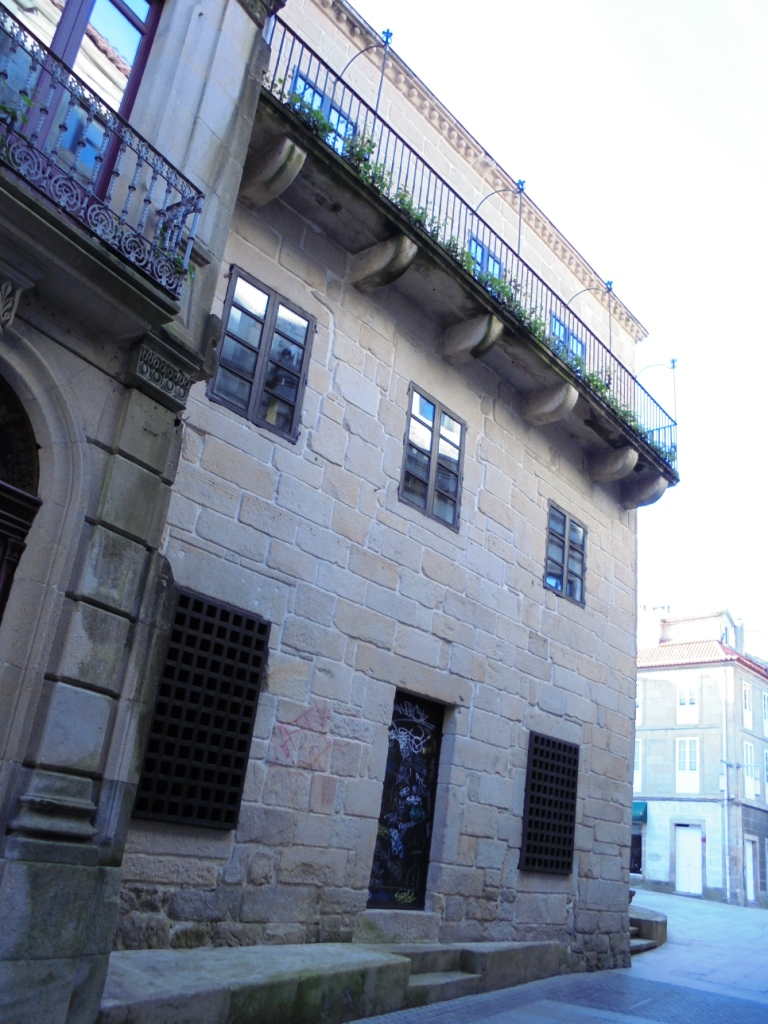
Side of the house with its second floor balcony

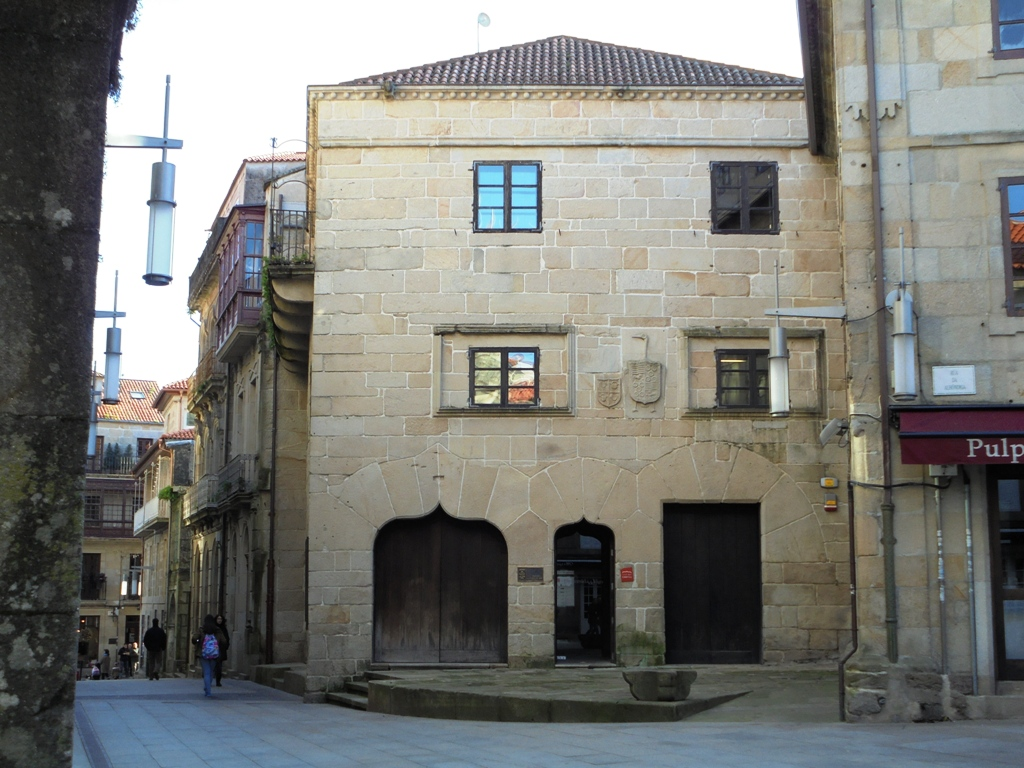
Don Filiberto street façade

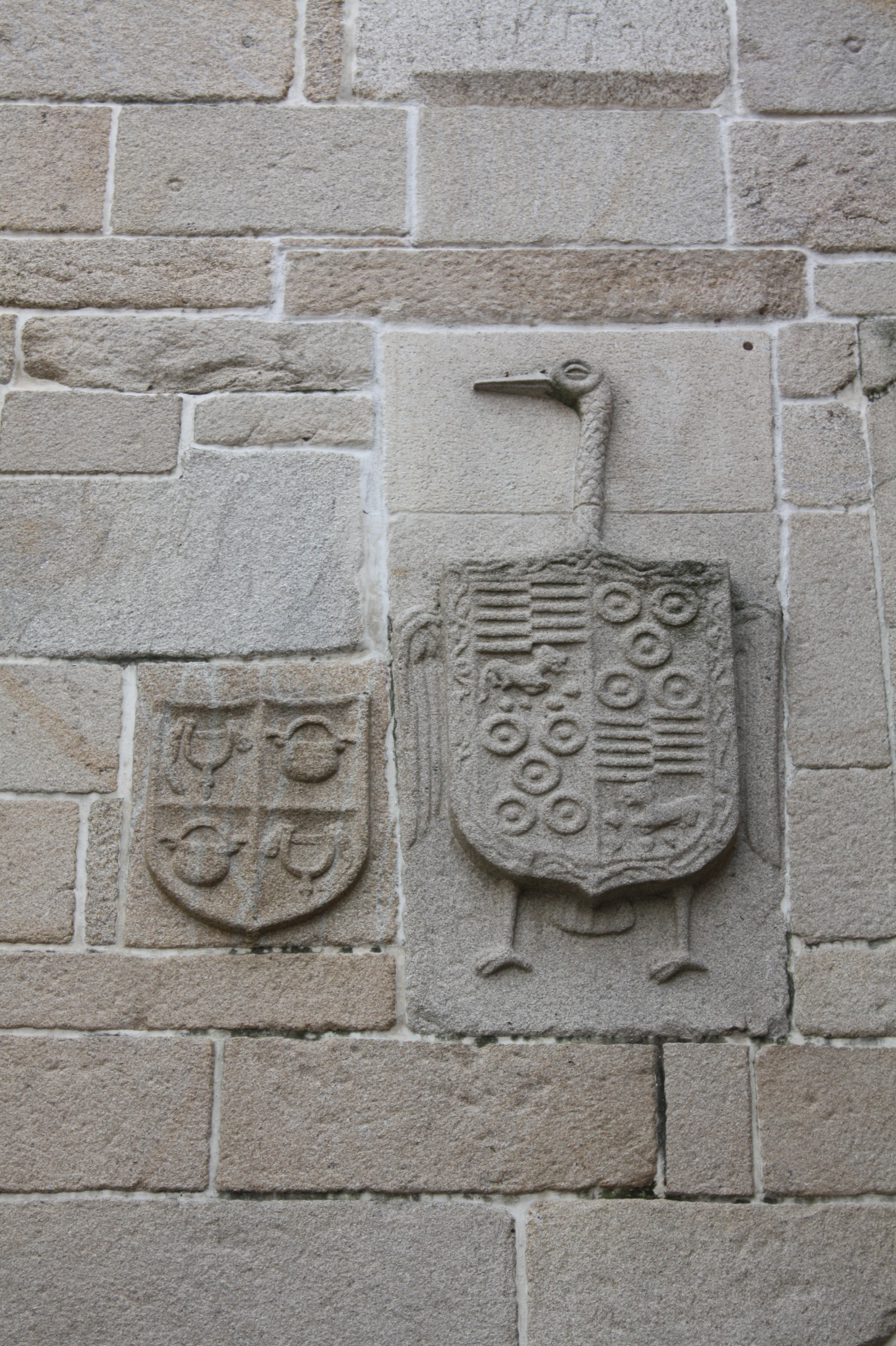
Puga and García-Camba coats of arms on the façade

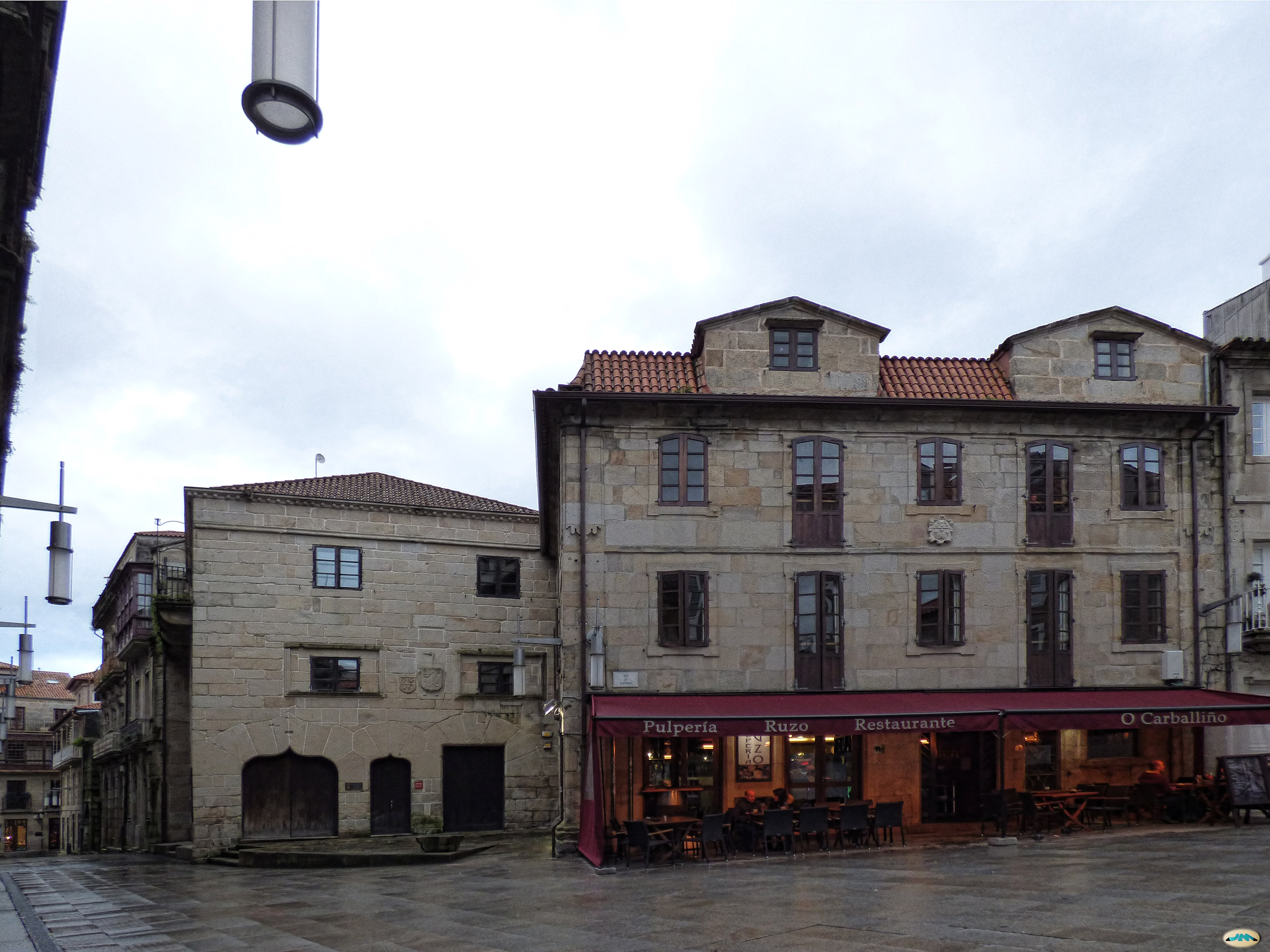
Old town of Pontevedra

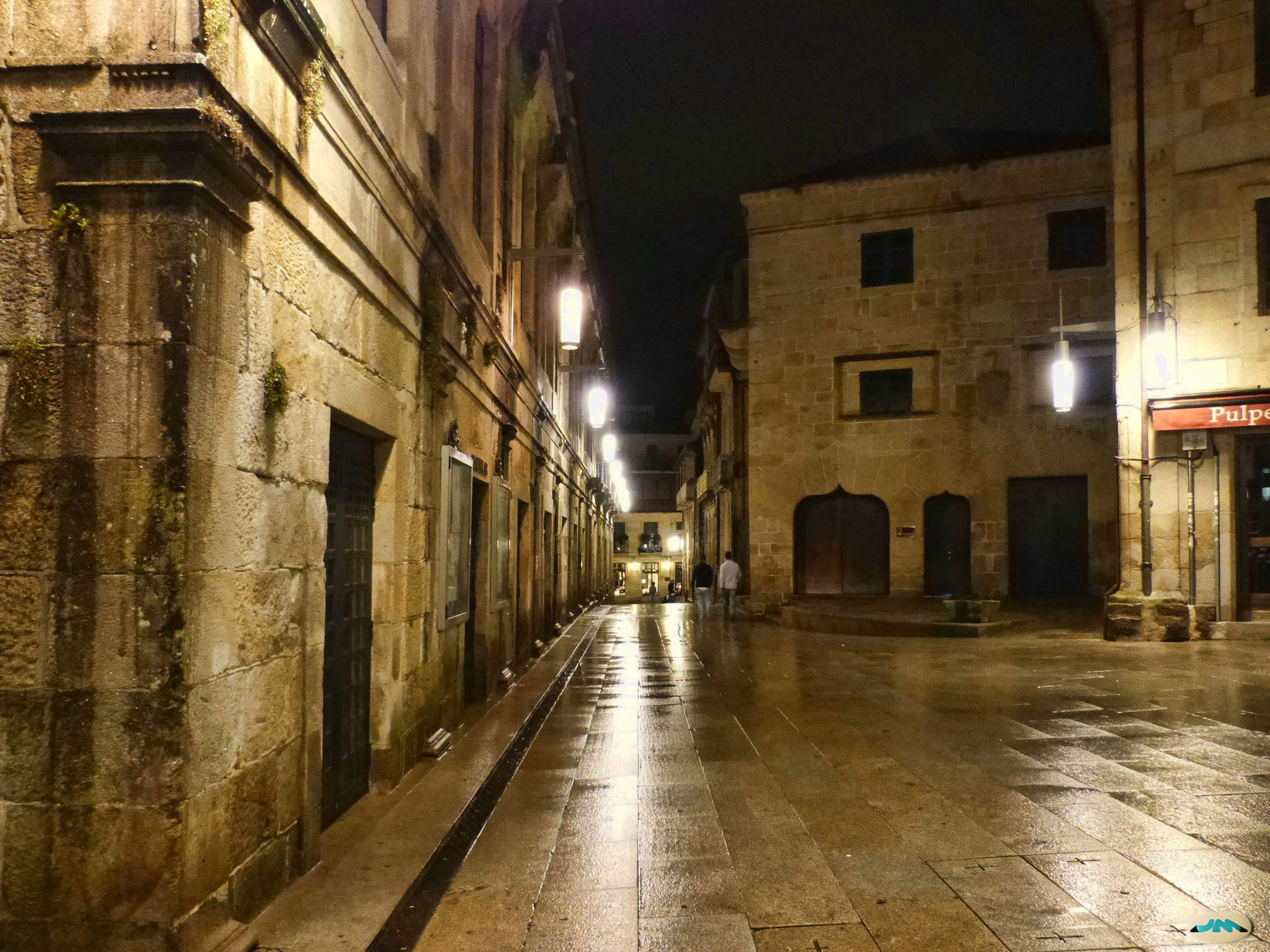
Don Filiberto street

== See also ==
=== Bibliography ===
- Fontoira Surís, Rafael (2009). Pontevedra monumental (in Spanish). Pontevedra: Diputación Provincial de Pontevedra. p. 223. ISBN 978-84-8457-327-2.

=== Related articles ===
- Spanish Gothic architecture
- Benito Soto
- Casa de los Vaamonde

=== External links ===
- Casa de las Campanas website Visit-Pontevedra
- Maison des cloches website Terras de Pontevedra
