= Tertulia Monument (Literary Circle in Modern Coffee) =

Sculptural group in Pontevedra, Spain

Monumento a la Tertulia
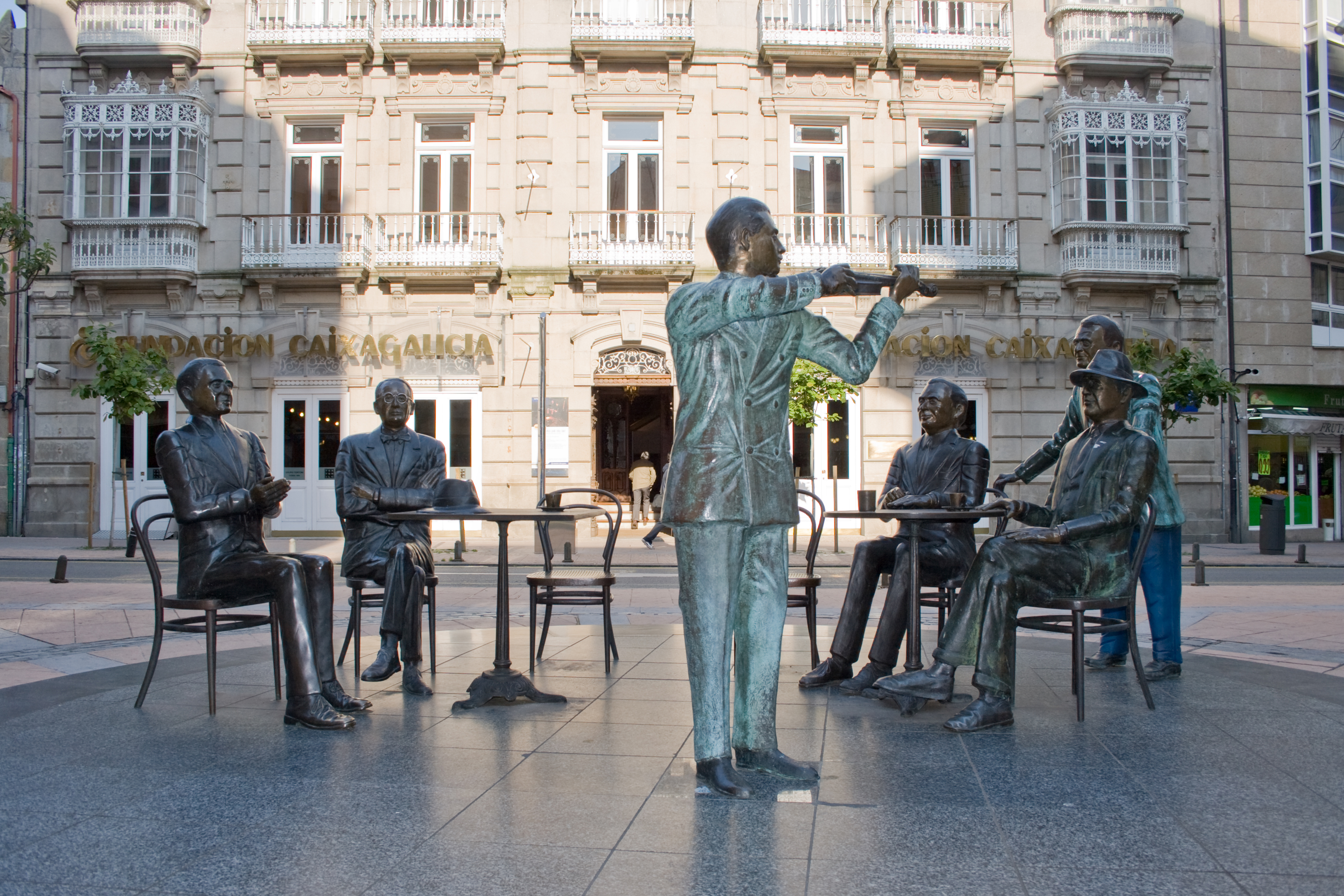
- The Tertulia Monument in 2010
- Artist: César Lombera
- Completion date: 13 January 2006; 20 years ago
- Medium: Bronze
- Subject: Manuel Quiroga, Castelao, Ramón Cabanillas, Carlos Casares, Valentín Paz Andrade and Alexandre Bóveda.
- Condition: Good
- Location: Pontevedra, Spain; 42°25′45.5″N 8°38′45.3″W

The Monument to the Tertulia, known as the Literary Circle in Modern Coffee, is a sculptural group created by the Spanish sculptor César Lombera, in Pontevedra (Spain). It is located in Saint Joseph's Square in front of the Café Moderno and the central building of the former Provincial Savings Bank of Pontevedra and was inaugurated on 13 January 2006.

== History ==
During the 19th and 20th centuries, Pontevedra was the scene of countless cultural events, such as those held at the Muruais house (attended by Valle-Inclán), at the Carabela and Savoy cafés and at Concepción Arenal house.

In the first decades of the 20th century, Pontevedra was a social and cultural hub and the epicentre of Galician intellectuals who met in lively political, literary and cultural meetings in the city. The meeting place par excellence was the Café Moderno, located on the ground floor of the most important art nouveau building in St. Joseph's Square.

These meetings and debates in the city focused, among other things, on the cultural and political contents of the magazine Nós or on Galician and local politics. It was on a marble table in the now defunct Café Méndez Núñez, located in the Plaza de la Peregrina, that Vicente Risco and Castelao conceived the magazine Nós, which would be published for a time at the Poza printing house in Michelena street.

The meetings were lively and time was set aside for them. The many civil servants who attended left the office early and the poets or writers did not have a demanding schedule. Everyone was interested in commenting on current literary events or in small political reflections.

The meetings (tertulias) of the Café Moderno, which took place mainly in the 1920s and 1930s, were originally literary gatherings that became political. After February 1936, these meetings were always multitudinous because Castelao brought direct information from the Congress, and it was in the context of this debate that the Galician Statute of Autonomy movement developed.

In addition to its function as a meeting point for the lives of citizens, as a space for the exchange of opinions on narrative, poetry or essays, these meetings in Pontevedra were real centres of power because they directly influenced political life.

== Description ==
These cultural and political meetings in the city are reflected in this sculptural group that recreates one of the most important meetings of Galician intellectuals of the time in the Café Moderno, led by the violinist Manuel Quiroga with his violin; it shows the writers and intellectuals Castelao (artist and writer), Ramón Cabanillas, Carlos Casares, Valentín Paz Andrade (politician and writer) and the politician and intellectual Alexandre Bóveda.

The sculptural group is placed on a circular base of polished black granite. It is made of bronze and shows the participants of the cultural meeting (tertulianos) sitting on chairs around two tables. It weighs two tons. The bronze of the figures has Patinas that give it different finishes and shades.

Around the two tables sat Alexandre Bóveda, Castelao, Valentín Paz Andrade and Ramón Cabanillas. The youngest member of the group, Carlos Casares, leans on the latter two, observing the scene, while all the participants in the meeting watch the performance of the violinist from Pontevedra, Manuel Quiroga.

The empty chairs next to the protagonists invite citizens to sit down and take pictures, so that the sculpture establishes a dialogue with the city.

Inside the Café Moderno, in one of its rooms, there is another sculptural group of the Monument to Tertulia. In this case, the replica of the statuary group is in polychrome bronze.

== Gallery ==
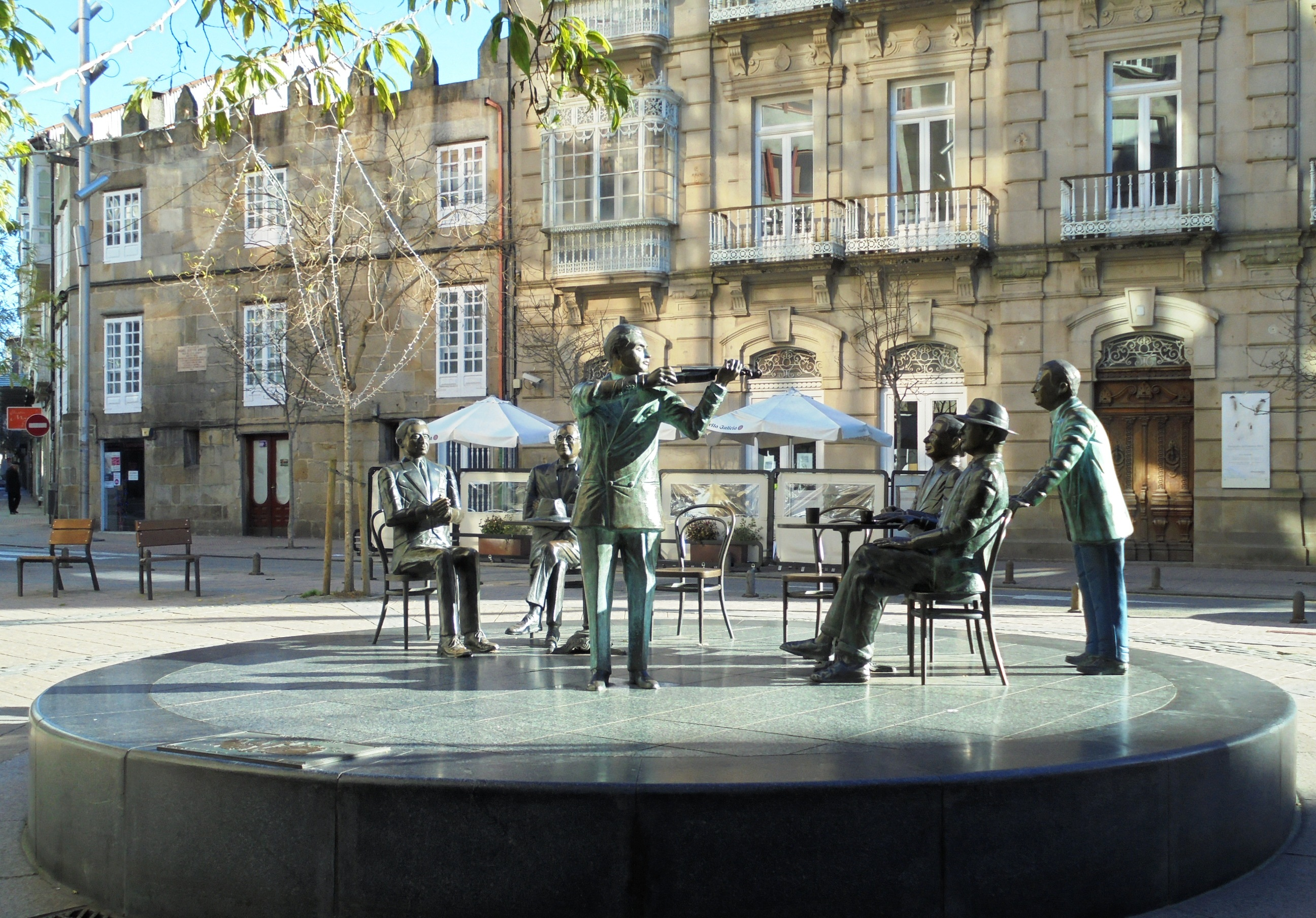
La Tertulia sculptural group

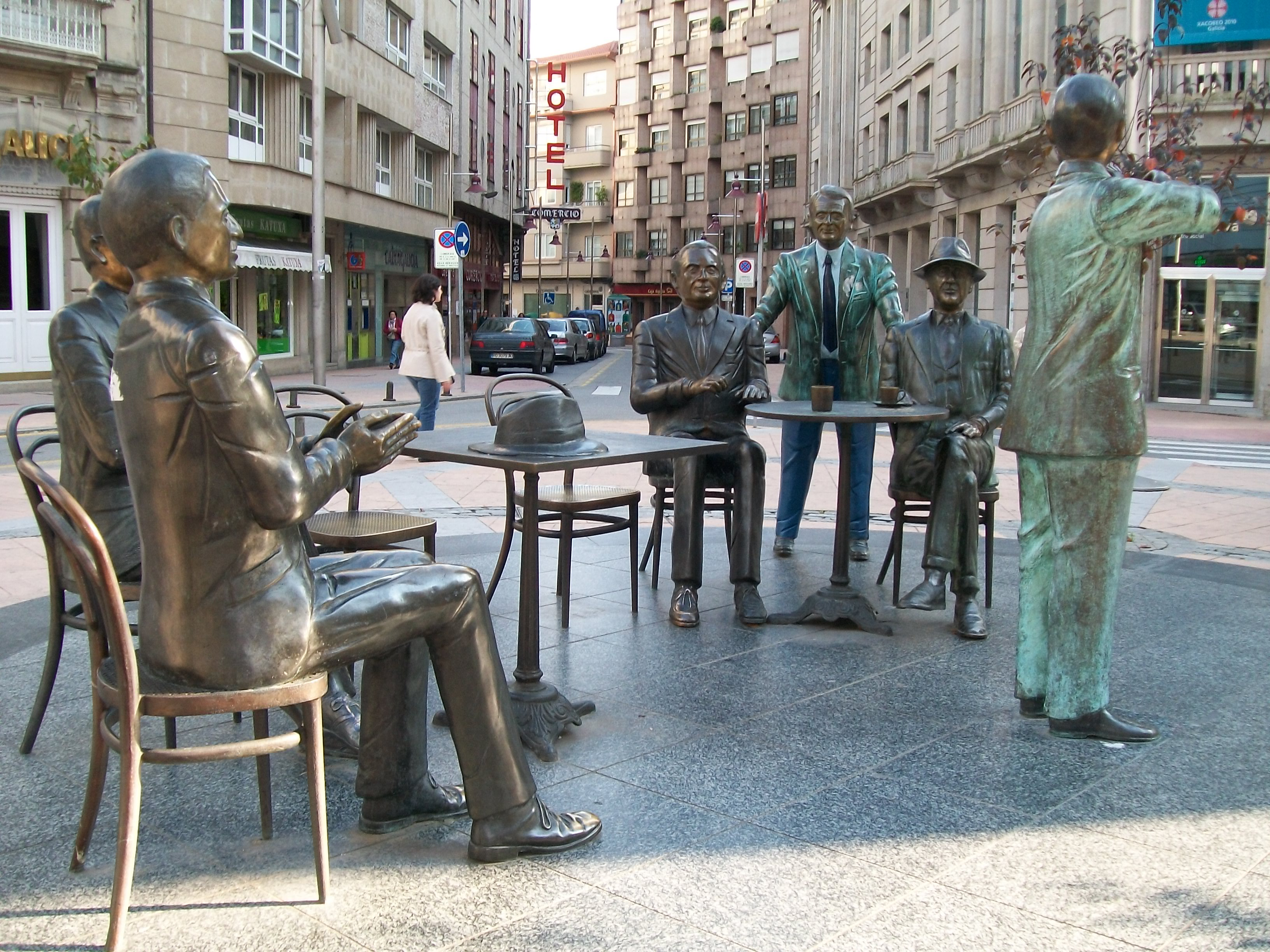
Sculptural group

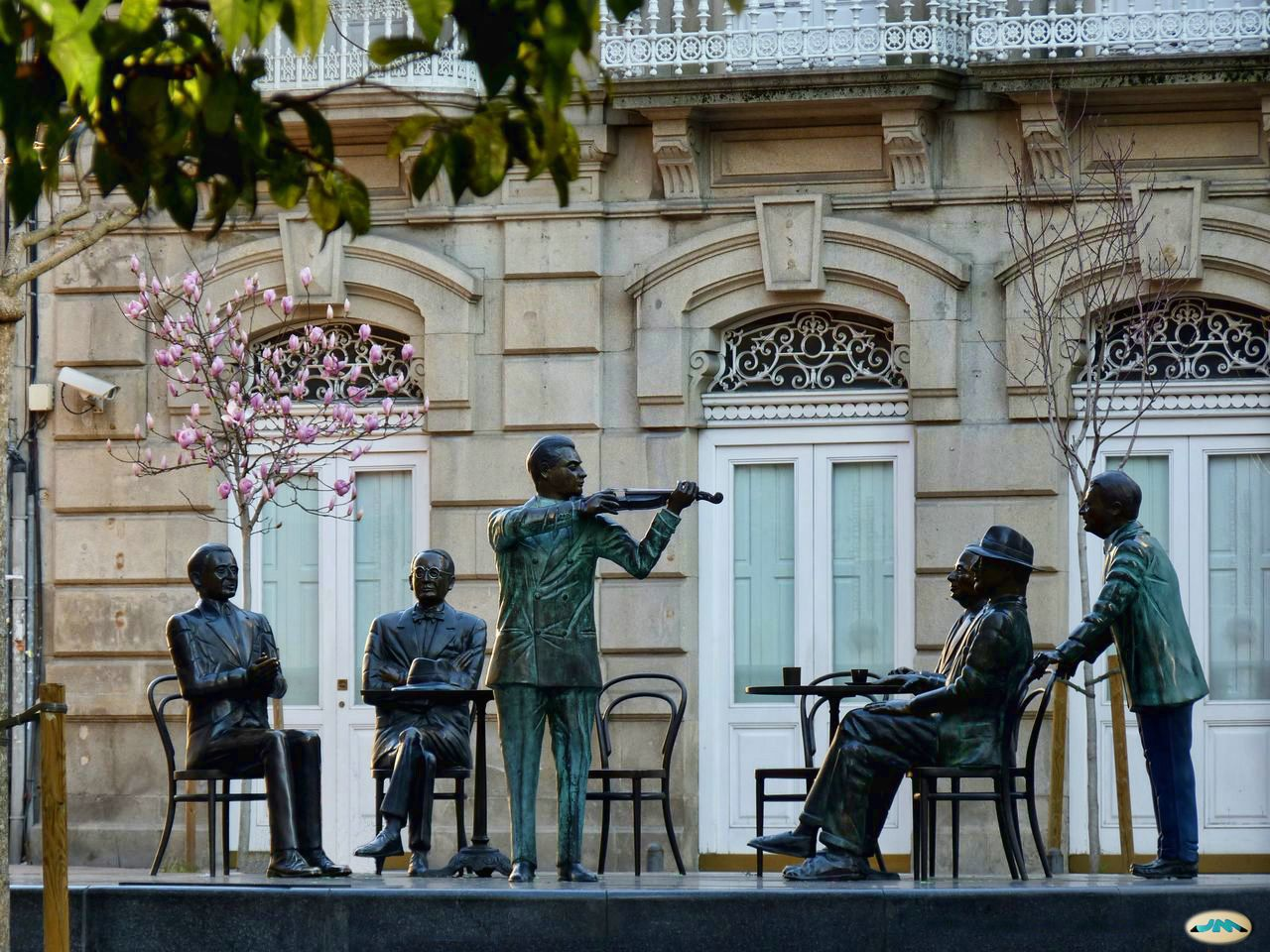
Participants in the cultural meeting

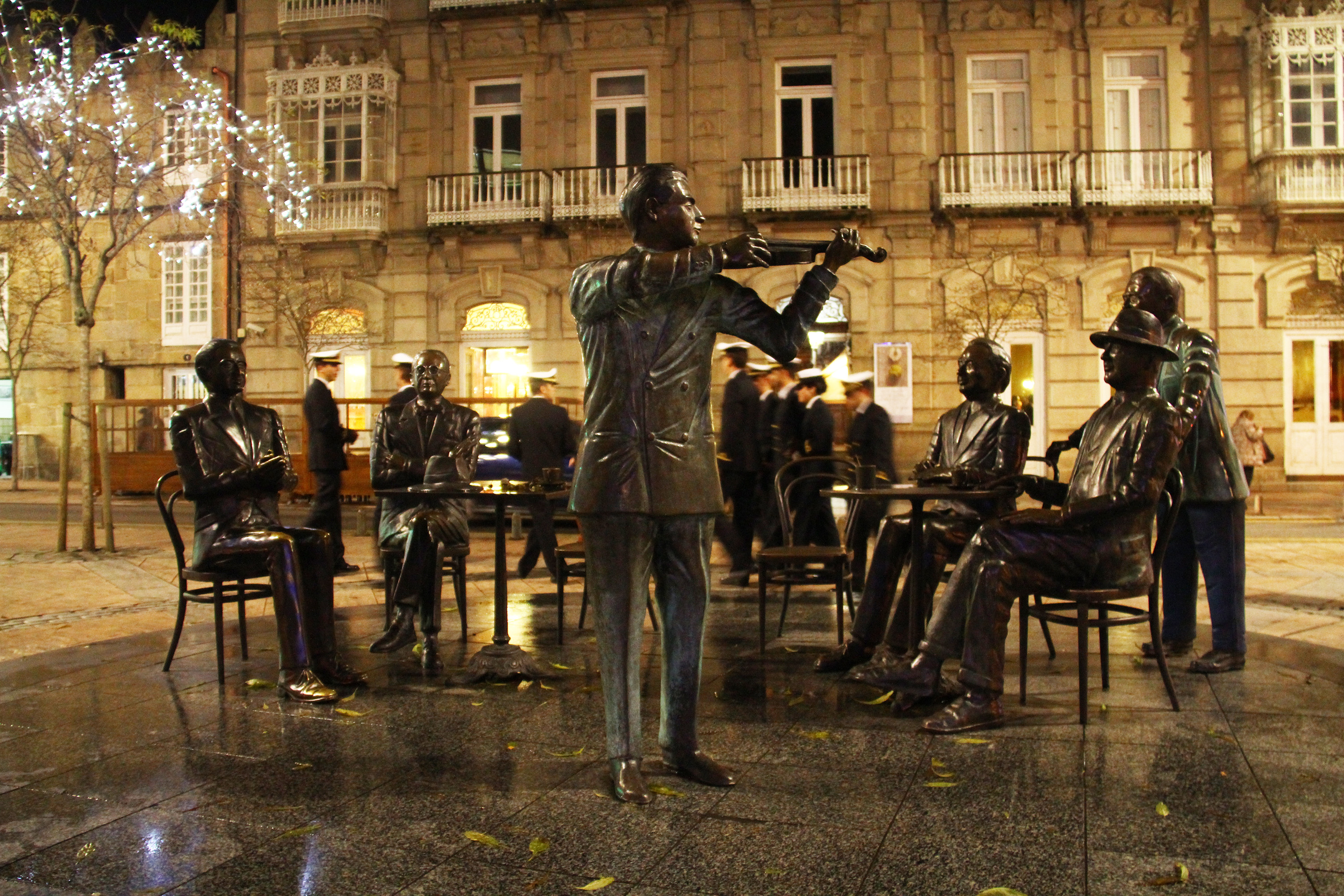
The sculptural group, at night

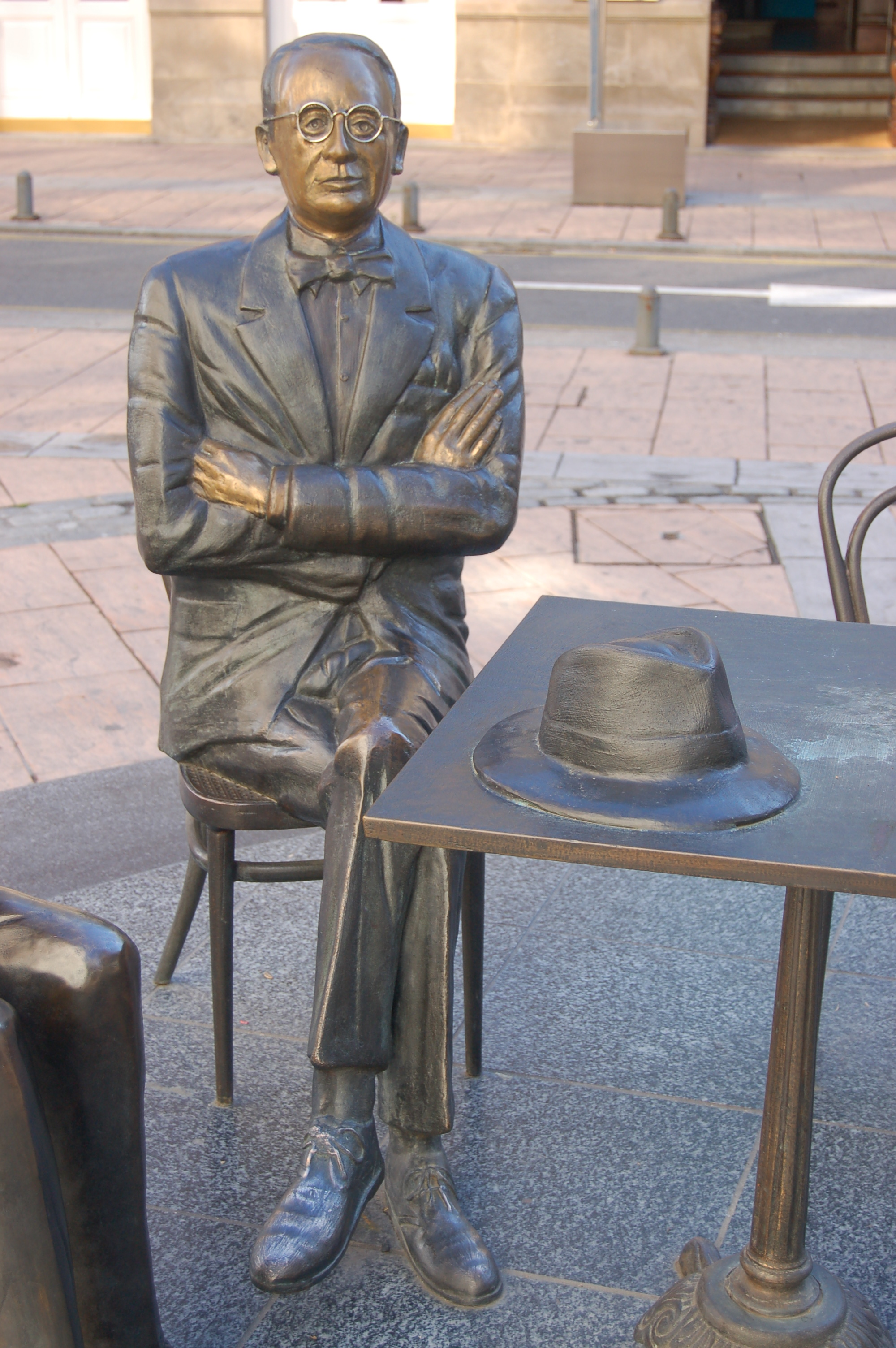
Castelao

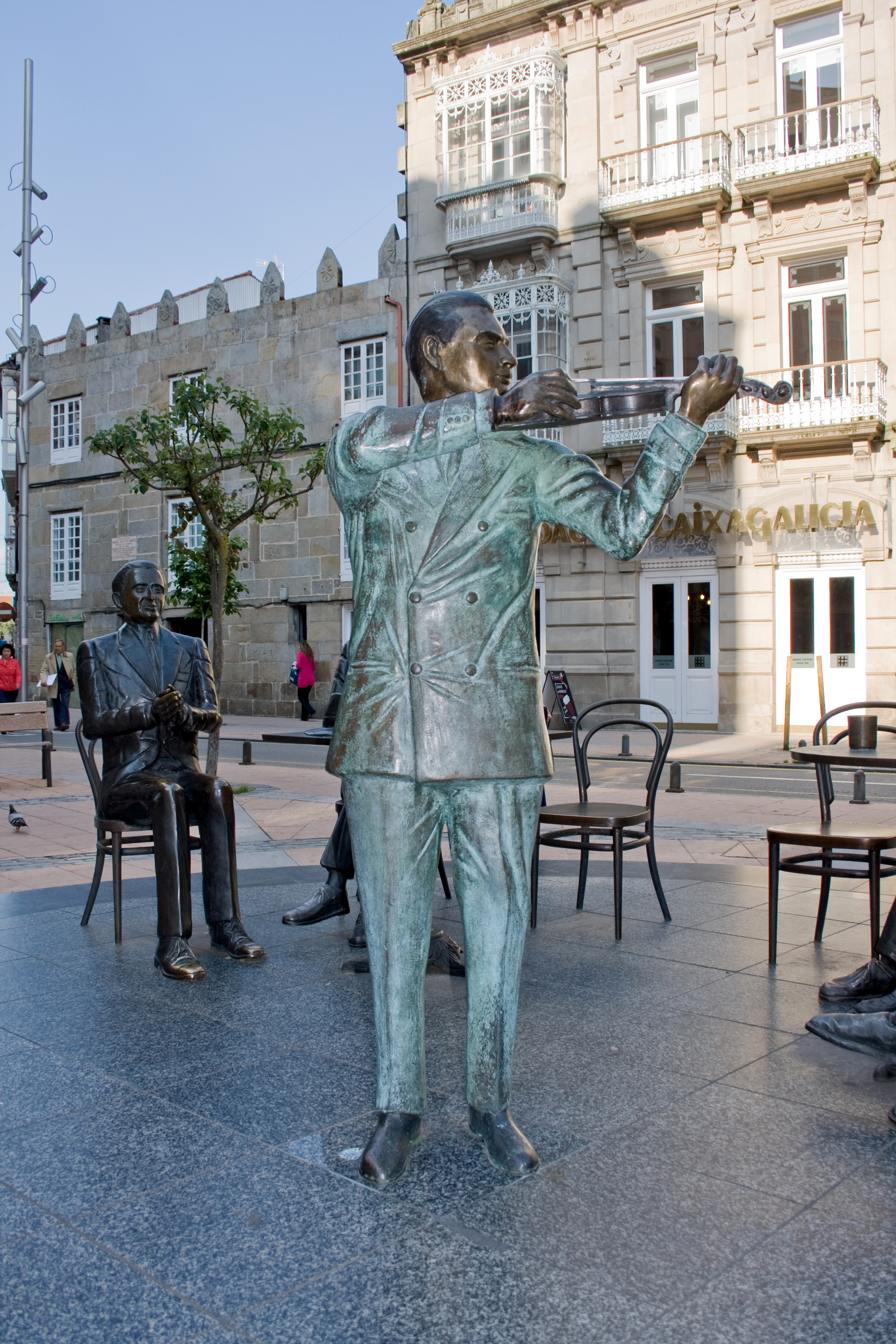
Manuel Quiroga

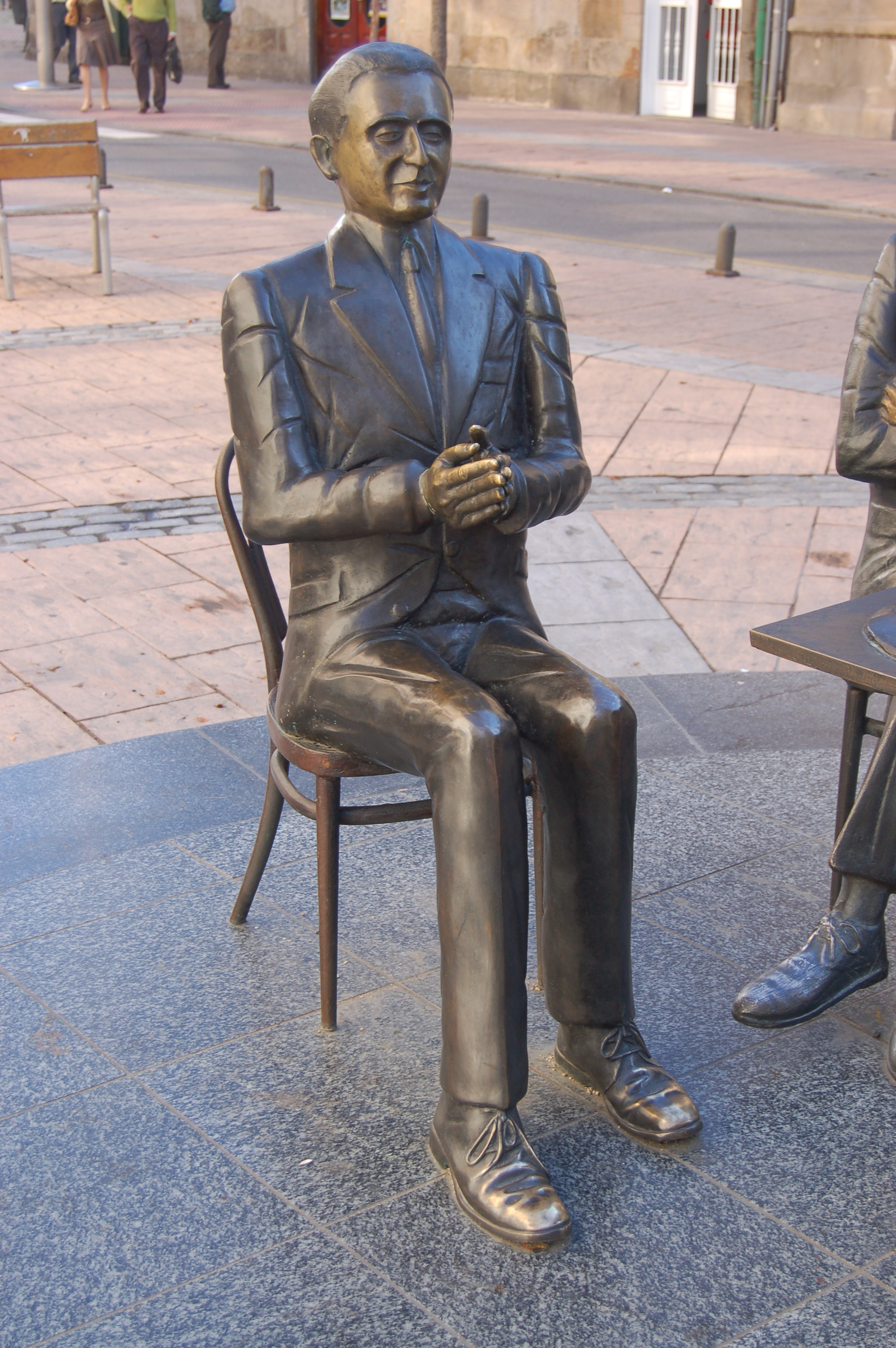
Alexandre Bóveda

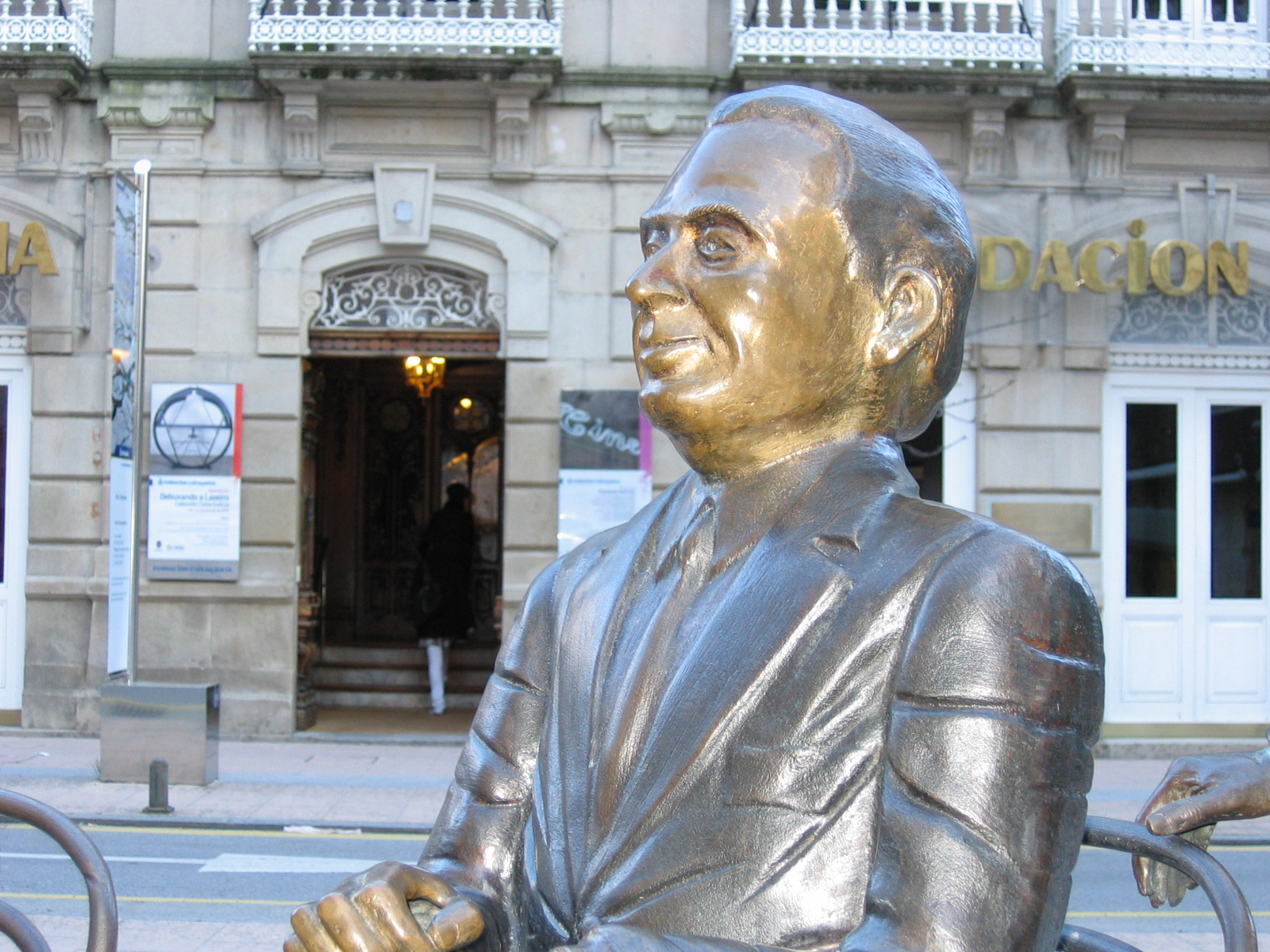
Valentín Paz Andrade

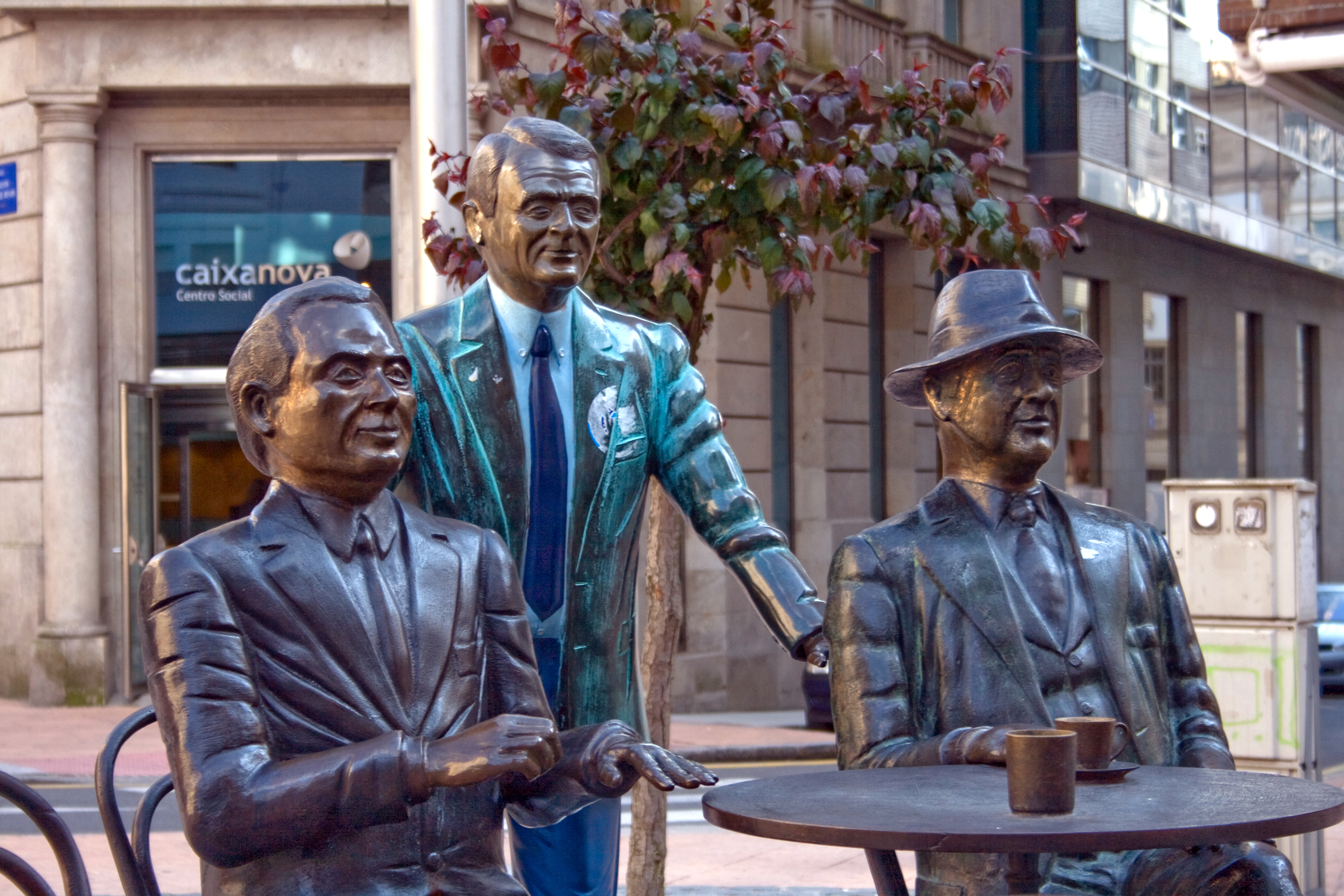
Ramón Cabanillas, Valentín Paz Andrade and Carlos Casares

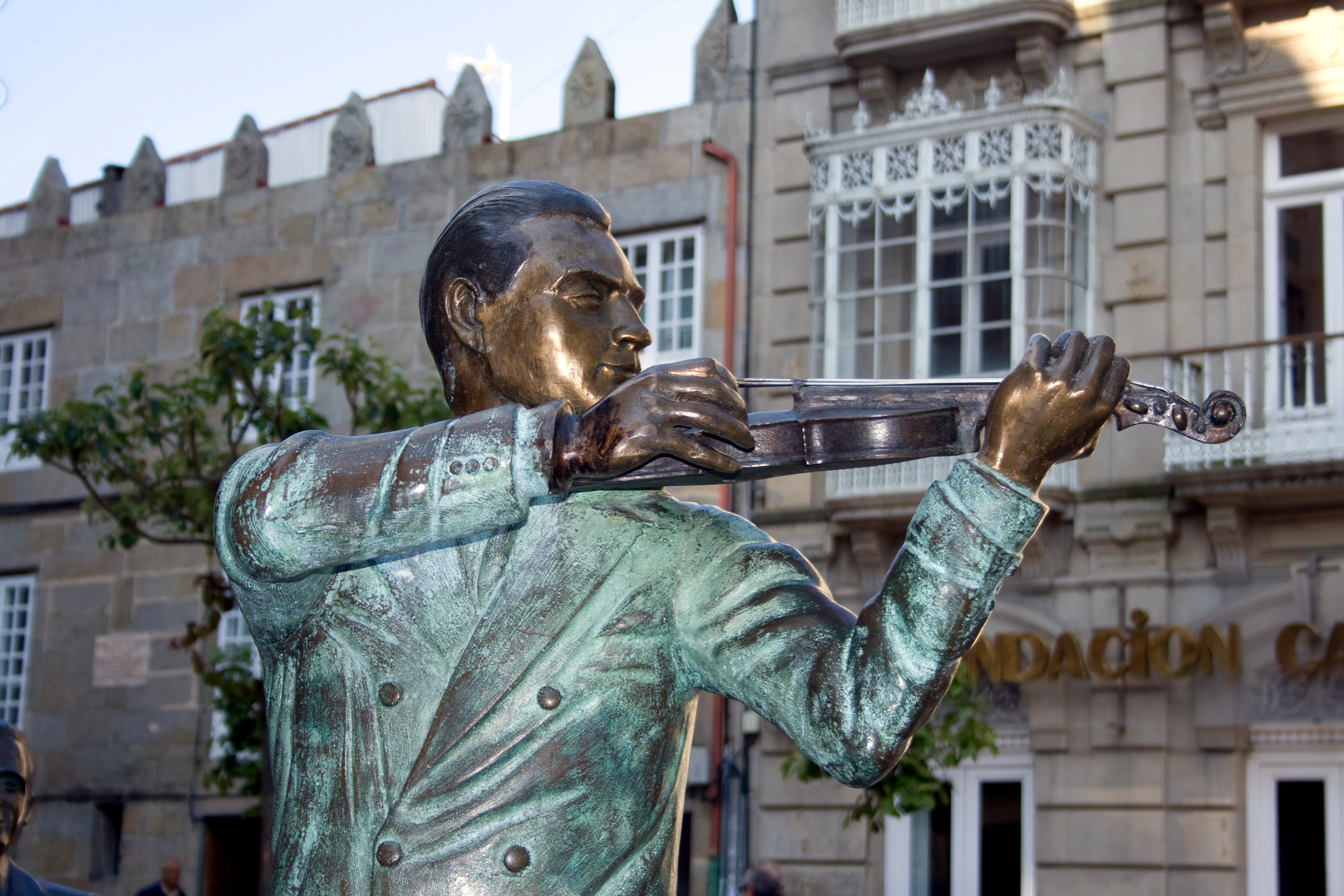
Manuel Quiroga playing the violin

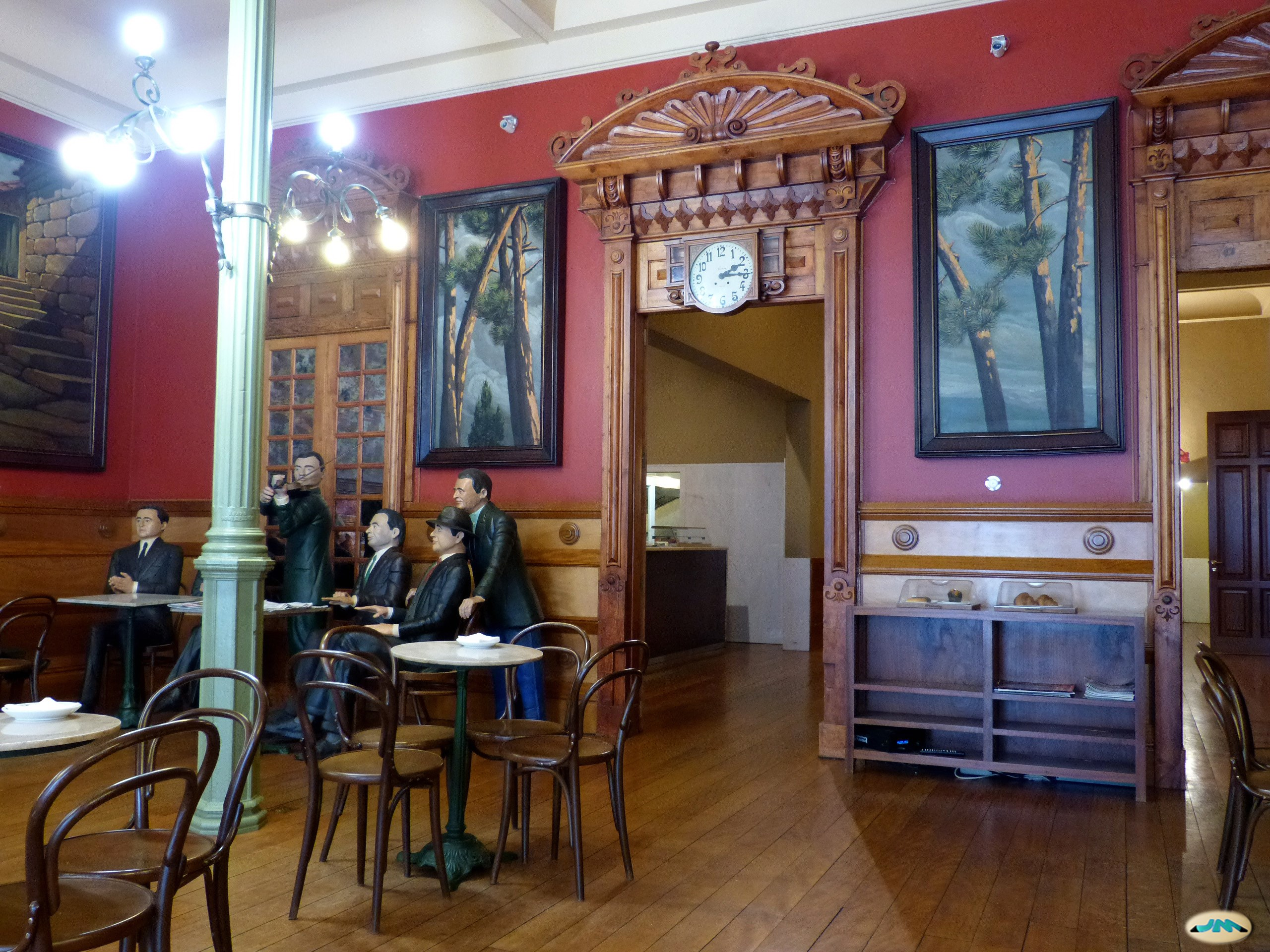
Polychrome sculptural group inside the Café Moderno

== See also ==
- Galicianism
- Statute of Autonomy of Galicia of 1936
- Plaza de San José
- Teucer statue

== Bibliography ==
- Aganzo, Carlos (2010). Pontevedra. Ciudades con encanto (in Spanish). Madrid: El País-Aguilar. pp. 99–100, 128–129. ISBN 978-8403509344..
- Riveiro Tobío, Elvira (2008). Descubrir Pontevedra (in Spanish). Pontevedra: Edicións do Cumio. pp. 51–52. ISBN 9788482890852..
