= Café Moderno (Pontevedra) =

Art Nouveau Building in Pontevedra, Spain

Modern Coffee
- Café Moderno
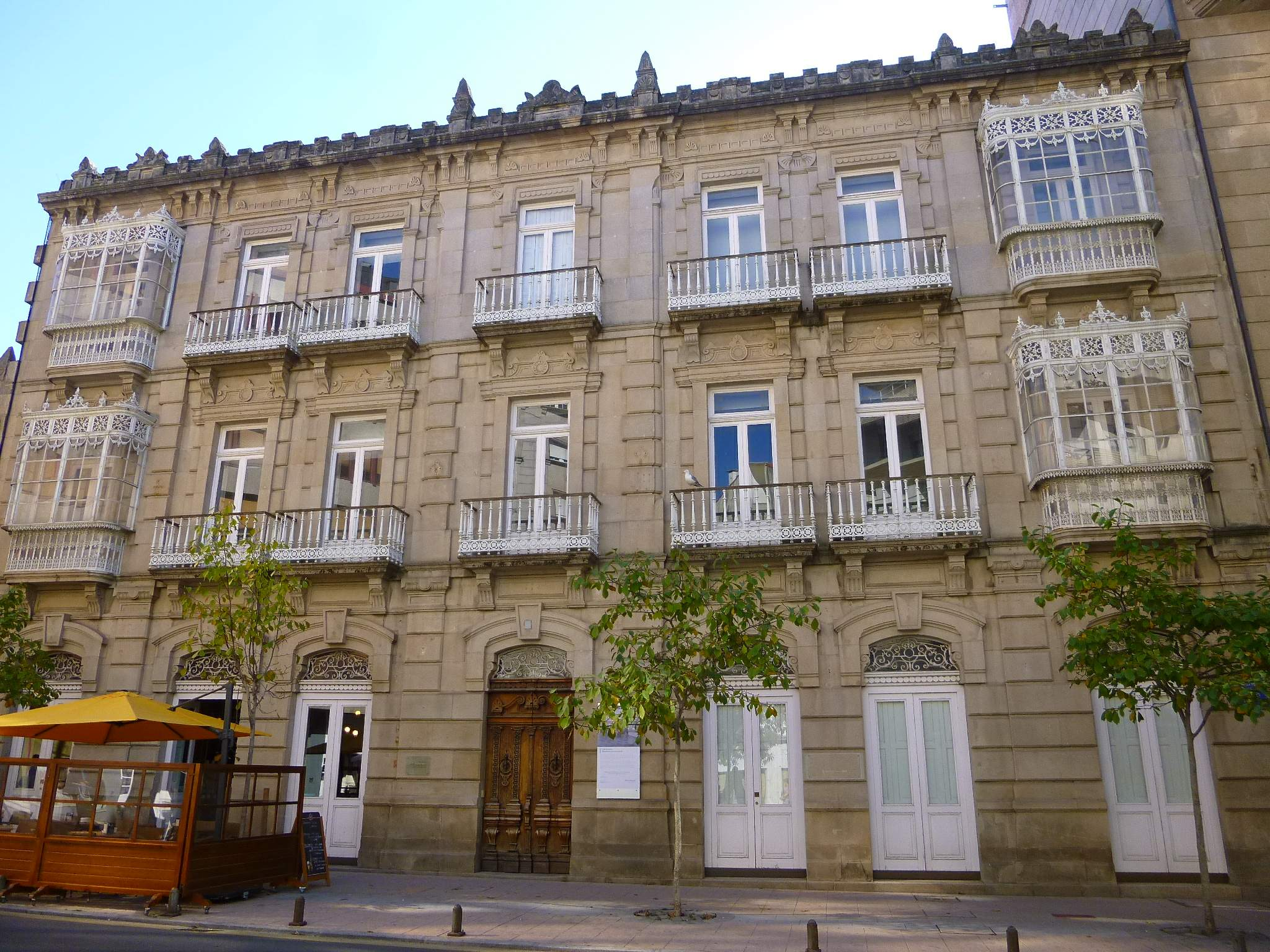
- Café Moderno façade

General information
- Type: Building
- Architectural style: Art Nouveau
- Location: Pontevedra, Galicia, Spain
- Coordinates: 42°25′51.1″N 8°38′50.8″W
- Completed: 1902
- Opening: 30 May 1903
- Owner: Abanca
- Operator: Afundación

Technical details
- Floor count: 3

Website
- afundacion.org/es/centros/centro/centro_cultural_afundacion_pontevedra_cafe_moderno

The Café Moderno (Modern Coffee) is an art nouveau and eclectic building located in St. Joseph's Square in Pontevedra, Spain. It is the building with the most important Art Nouveau interior in the city. It is currently the headquarters of one of the socio-cultural centres of Pontevedra Afundación, owned by the Abanca bank.

== History ==
On the site where the building was erected was the former Pazo de los Gago de Mendoza. It was promoted by the rich native of Pontevedra who returned from Cuba, Bernardo Martínez-Bautista Herrera, and was completed in 1902. His initials can be seen on the front door and the date of completion (BMB 1902). It was designed to house a two-storey building with four flats (two per floor), including that of the bourgeois Martínez-Bautista himself on the first floor and a ground floor to house the Café Moderno. In the flat on the second floor on the left, the great Pontevedrian architect and master of the modern movement in Spain, Alejandro de la Sota, was born in 1913.

In 1903, Valentín García Termes fitted out the rooms on the ground floor and on 30 May 1903, the Café Moderno, an artistic reference in commercial interior architecture, was inaugurated. It also functioned as a variety and entertainment venue and had the city's first cinematograph in 1904.

The Café Moderno became a literary and artistic centre where the new republican, socialist and galicianist ideologies were forged. Figures such as Castelao, Valentín Paz-Andrade, Alexandre Bóveda, and Ramón Cabanillas met in its rooms. In 1932, the Café Moderno also hosted Federico García Lorca.

It was in the Café that the first Statute of Autonomy of Galicia was written. With the arrival of militarism in 1936, its activity decreased and after a few decades without activity, it finally closed its doors.

The building was acquired in 1973 by the Caja Rural Provincial de Pontevedra to be used as the headquarters of the entity, which began operating in January 1974.

In July 1998, the architect Alvaro Siza undertook the complete renovation of the building for the Caixa Galicia Foundation. The decorative elements (especially the frescoes and paintings) were recovered, both on the ground floor and in the living quarters. On 24 October 2000 the café reopened its doors. The ground floor still functions as a café and the upper floors are exhibition rooms and offices.

== Description ==
The building has an eclectically decorated stone façade and wrought iron galleries. It has a geometric treatment of ornamental elements, some classical, such as the Palmettes on the cornice and the unbevelled rubble in continuous bands along the façade. A wide and elegant entrance leads to the building's wooden staircase.

The use of three materials is remarkable: granite masonry, cast iron and wood. On the ground floor, the stylized floral windows are reminiscent of English Arts and Crafts. Cast iron is used in several elements of the house, such as the balconies on the facades, the Corinthian columns on the ground floor in the rooms of the Café Moderno, the balustrade of the central staircase and the staircase leading to the garden.

The rear of the building is entirely covered by a large wooden gallery which rests on the ground on stone pillars. The garden is accessed from the first floor on the left. The garden is equipped for family recreation with tropical species, kiosks, Hedges and fountains. On 18 September 2003, a 3.15-metre high, 7.5 tonne granite sculpture of Castelao by sculptor Francisco Leiro was unveiled in the café's inner garden.

The interior of the Café Moderno building is the best example of Art Nouveau in the city. The house of Bernardo Martinez-Bautista is the only one that had decorated ceilings and walls. The lighted rooms of the Café contain the original mirrors and lamps and examples of the French, floral and classical models with which the Spanish bourgeoisie decorated their homes in the second half of the 19th century. The interior decoration includes comic paintings by Monteserín, from the beginning of the 20th century, and the three historical-mythological paintings by Carlos Sobrino incorporated in 1914, as well as the landscapes by Pintos Fonseca (1940) and the mural by Laxeiro (1949).

== Culture ==
Outside, in San José Square, is the Monument to the Tertulia or Literary Circle in Modern Coffee, which recreates the meetings of the most important Galician intellectuals of the first third of the 20th century, such as Castelao, Alexandre Bóveda, Valentín Paz-Andrade or Ramón Cabanillas, who used to meet in the city, being the meeting place par excellence the Café Moderno. Inside the Café, there is also a monument to these famous intellectuals.

== Gallery ==
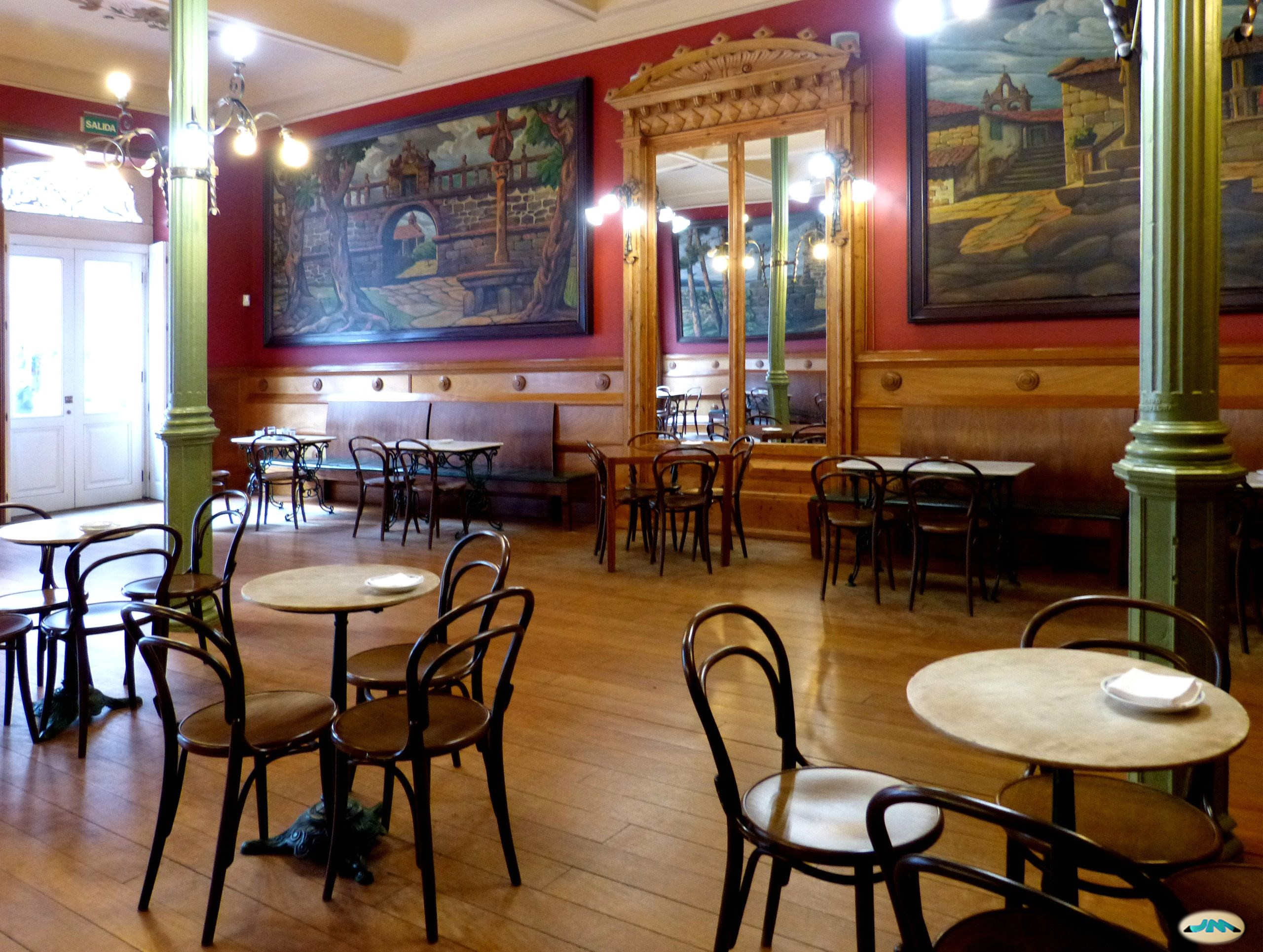
Art Nouveau Interior

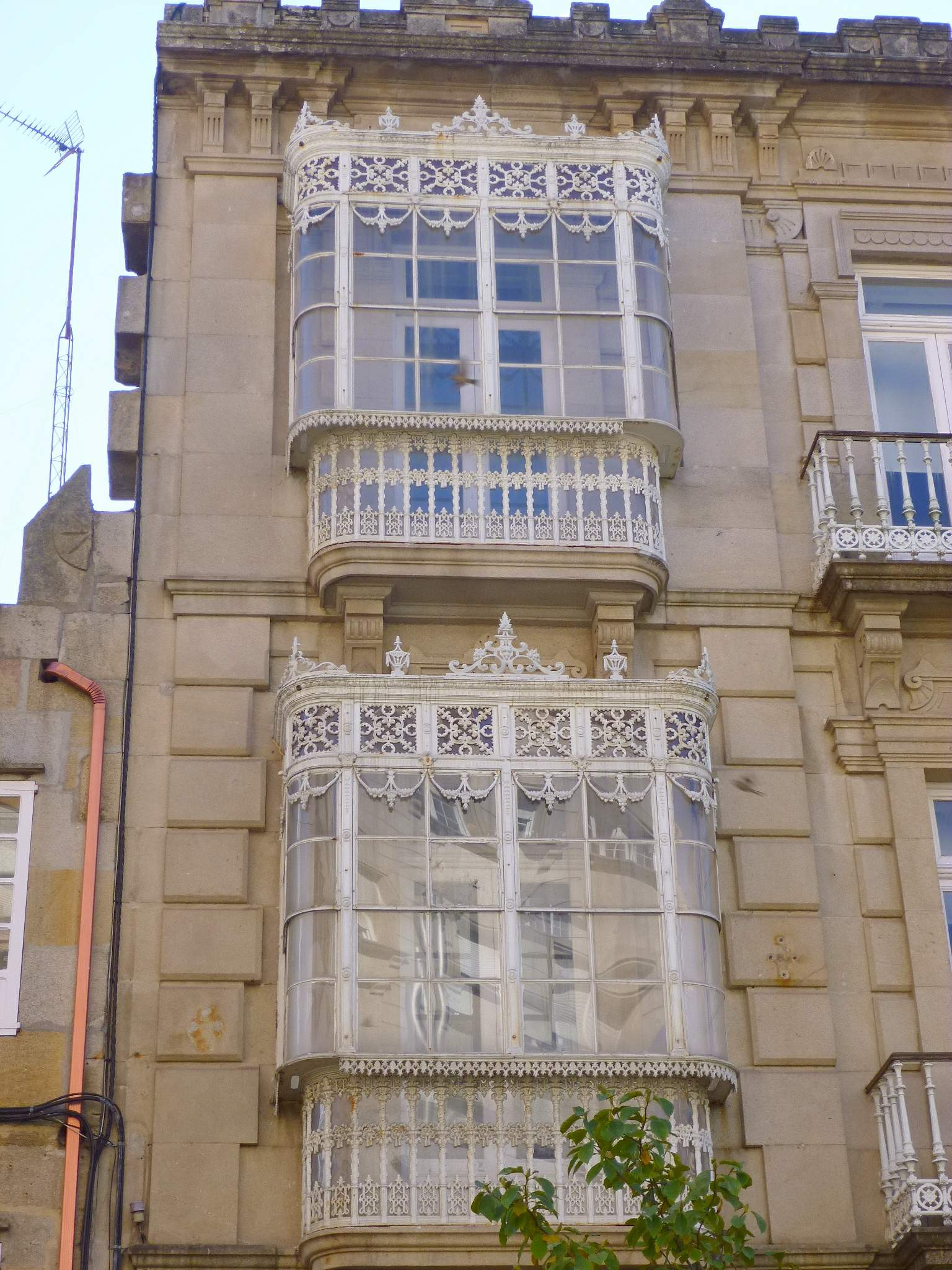
Art Nouveau Gallery

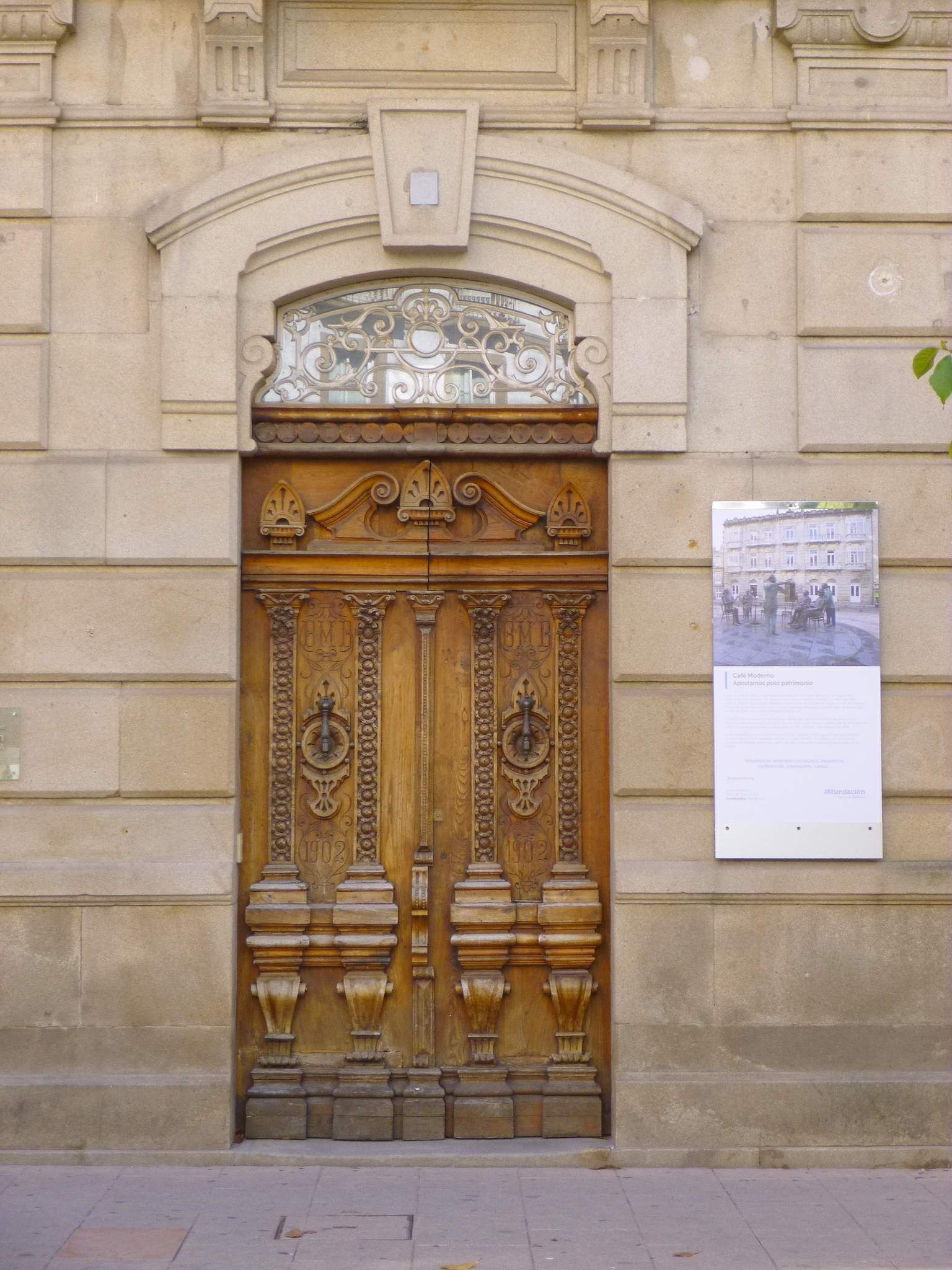
Entrance door to the building with initials and date of completion (BMB 1902)

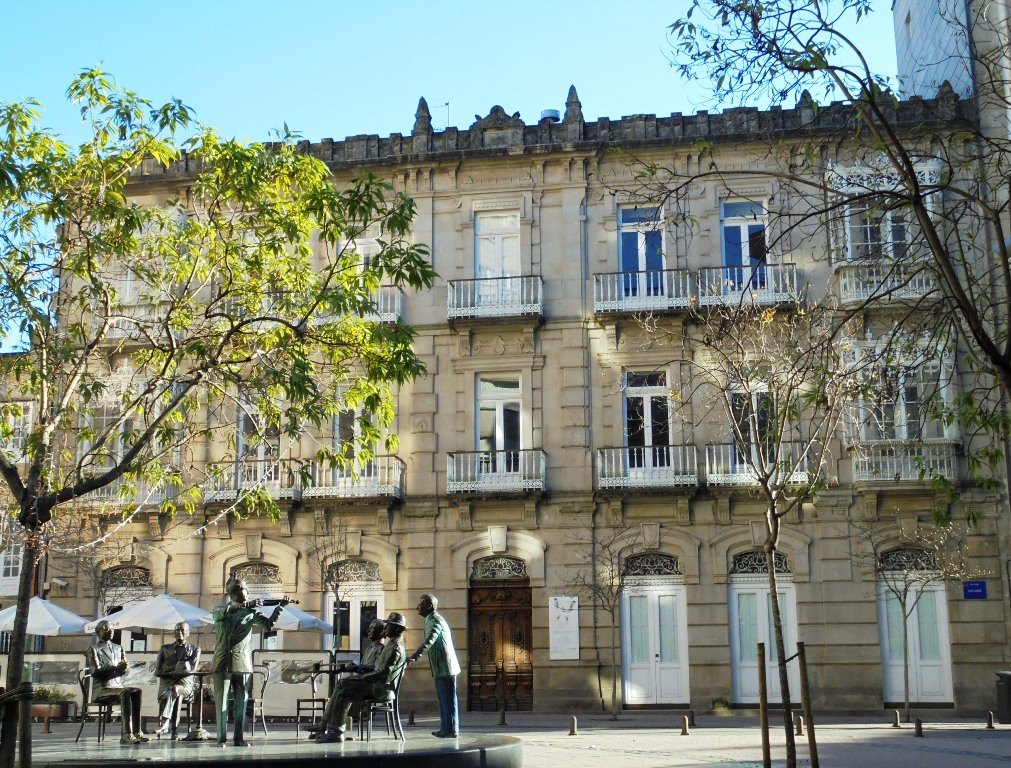
Façade and Tertulia Monument

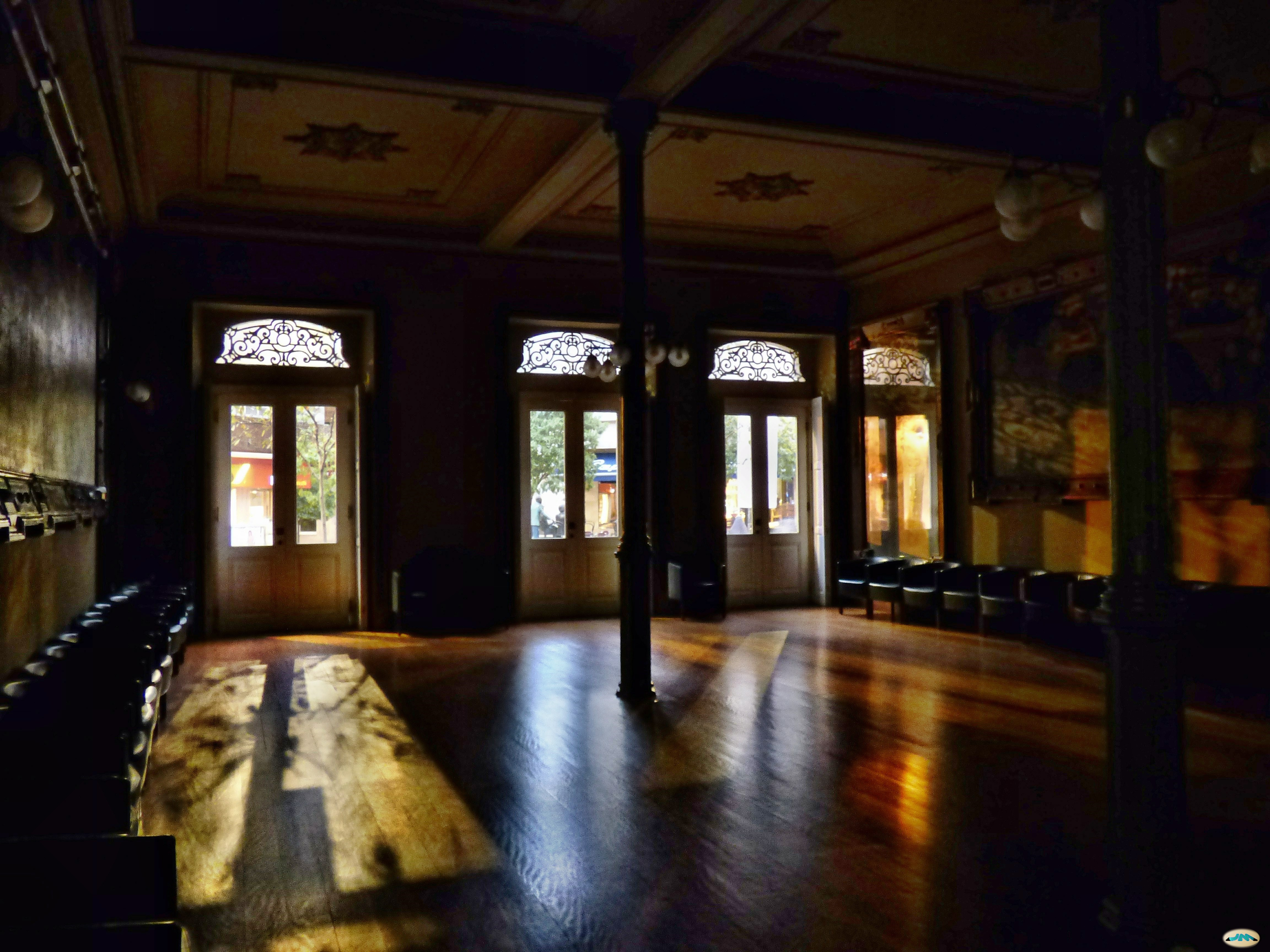
Inside

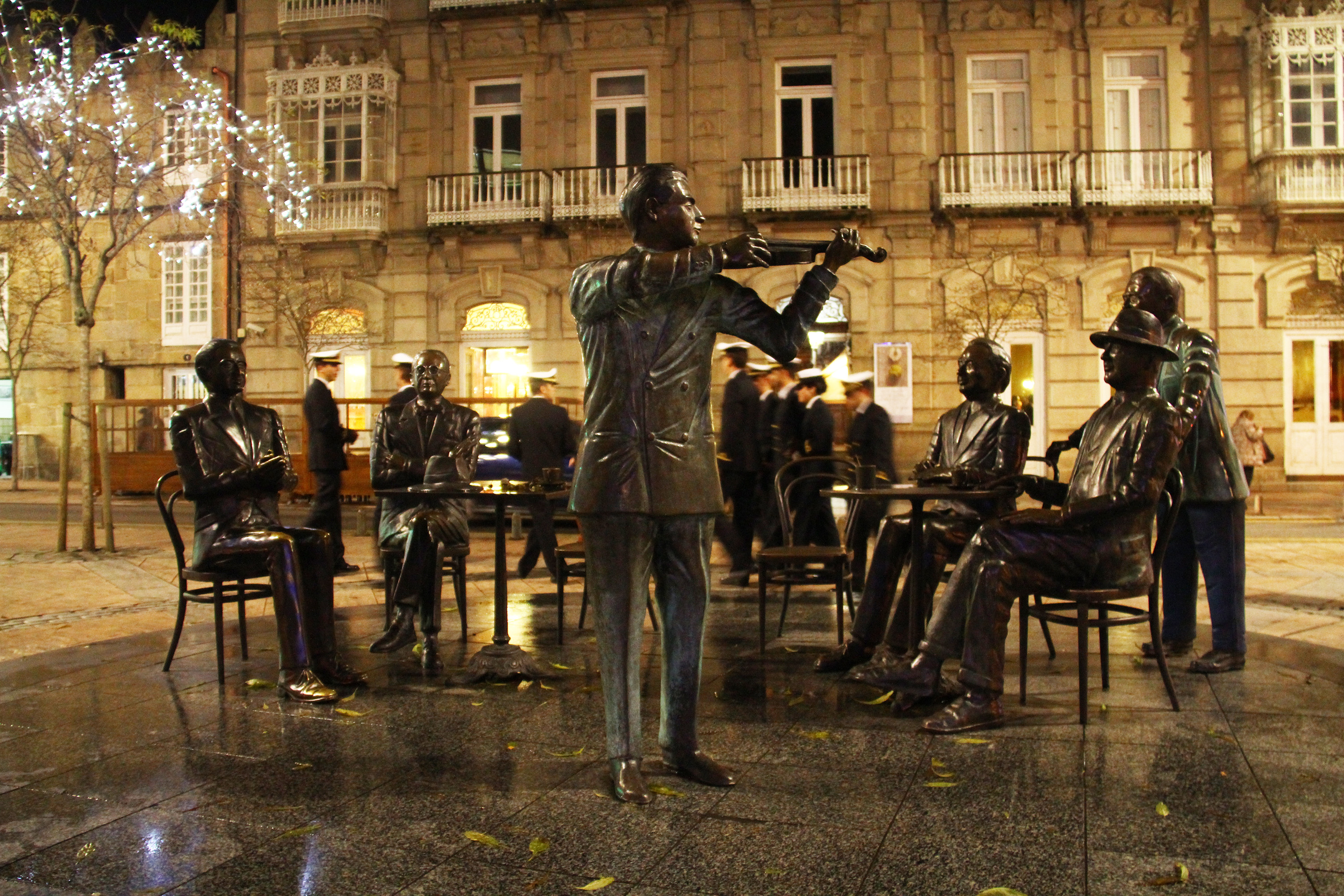
Tertulia Monument in front of the Café

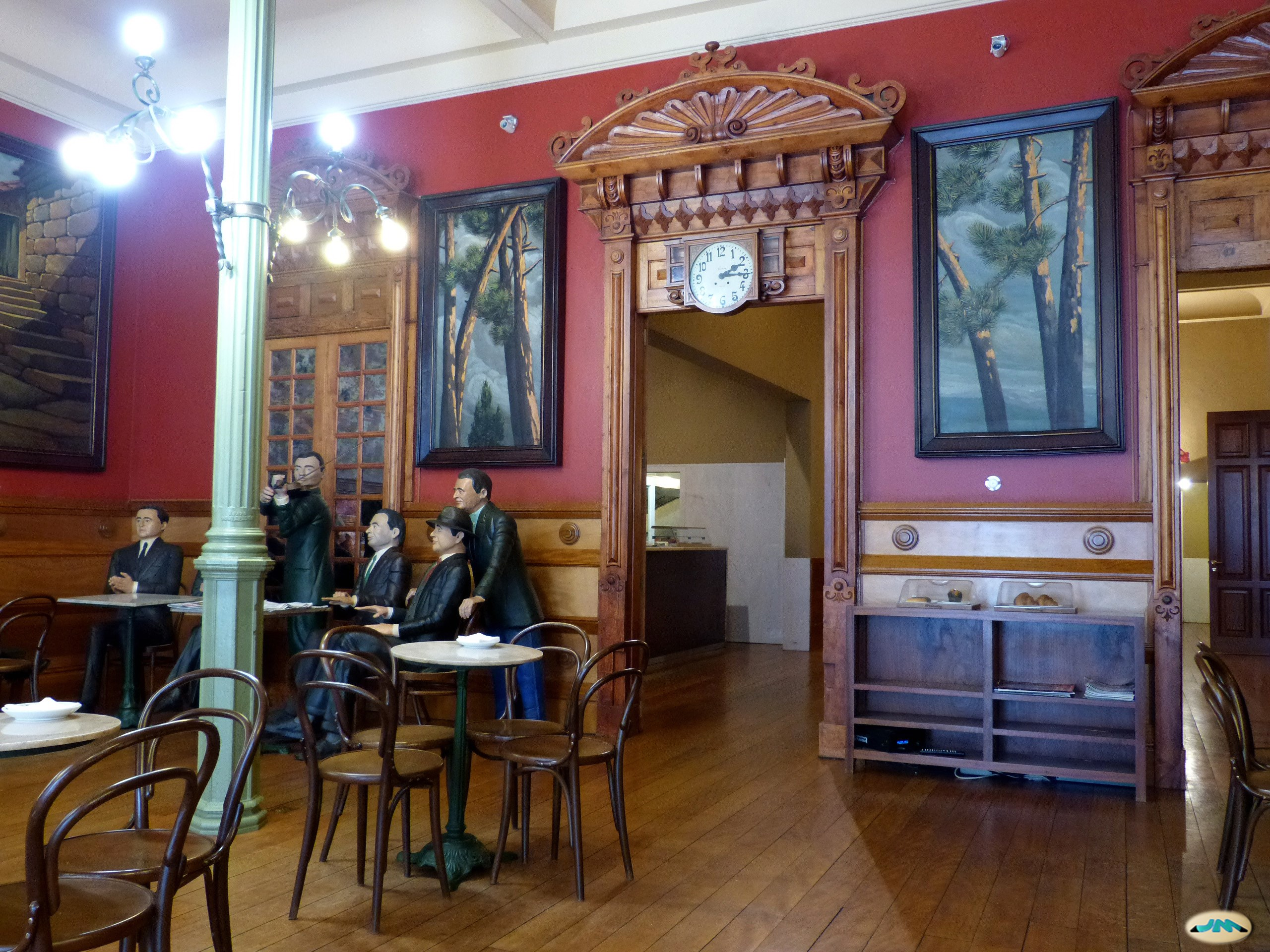
Tertulia Monument inside the café

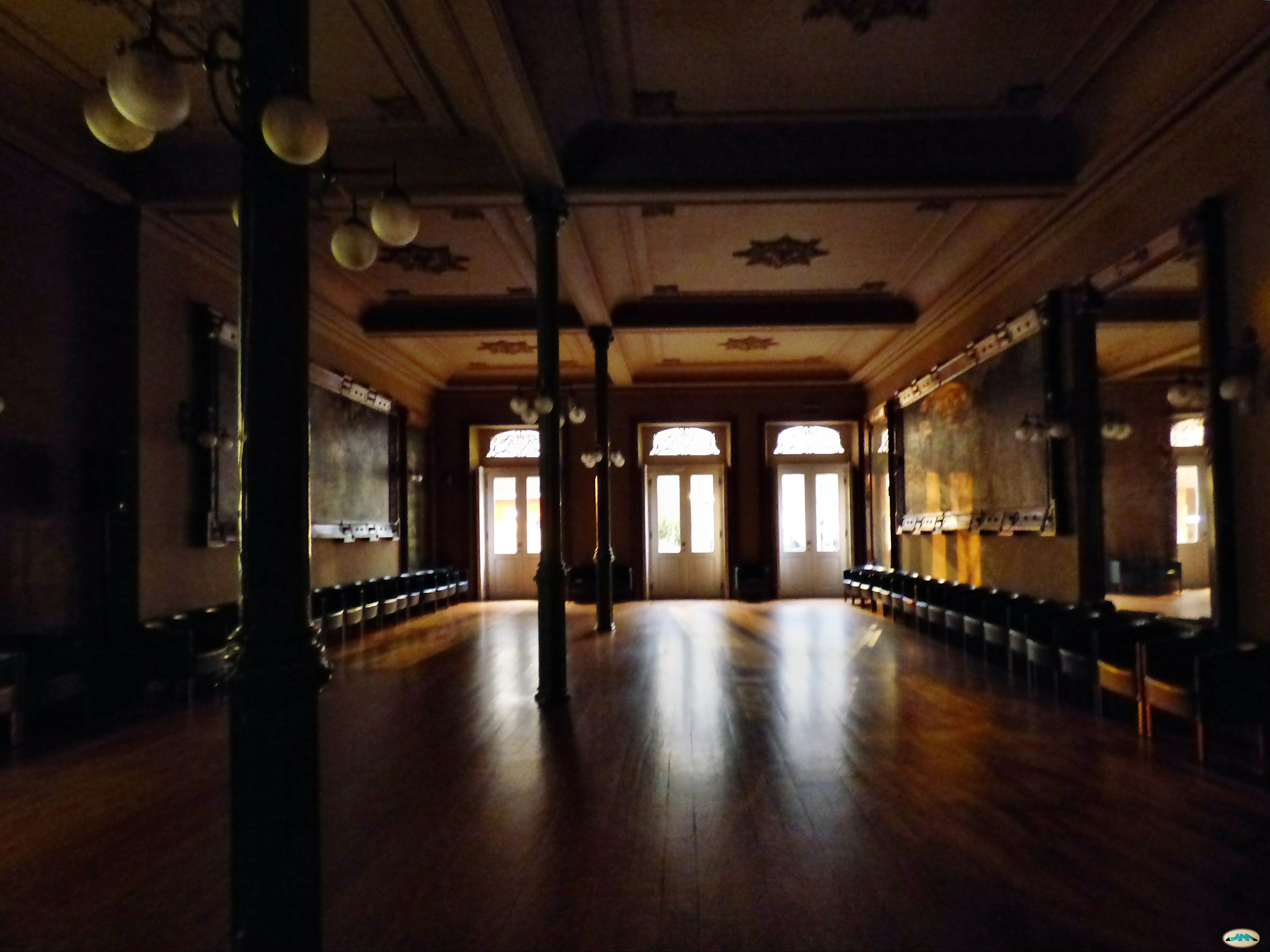
Living room indoors

== Bibliography ==
- Aganzo, Carlos (2010). Pontevedra. Ciudades con encanto (in Spanish). Madrid: El País-Aguilar. pp. 99–100. ISBN 978-8403509344.
- Nadal, Paco (2012). Rias Baixas. Escapadas (in Spanish). Madrid: El País-Aguilar. p. 39. ISBN 978-8403501089.
- Riveiro Tobío, Elvira (2008). Descubrir Pontevedra (in Spanish). Pontevedra: Edicións do Cumio. p. 52. ISBN 9788482890852.

== See also ==
=== Related articles ===
- Tertulia Monument (Literary Circle in Modern Coffee)
- Plaza de San José
- Alejandro de la Sota
- Villa Pilar

=== External links ===
- Café Moderno, sur le site Afundación
- The building of the old Modern Coffee in Pontevedra: its architecture
- Asociación para la Protección del Patrimonio Histórico “El Café Moderno o La joie de vivre”
