= San José Square =

Square in Pontevedra, Spain

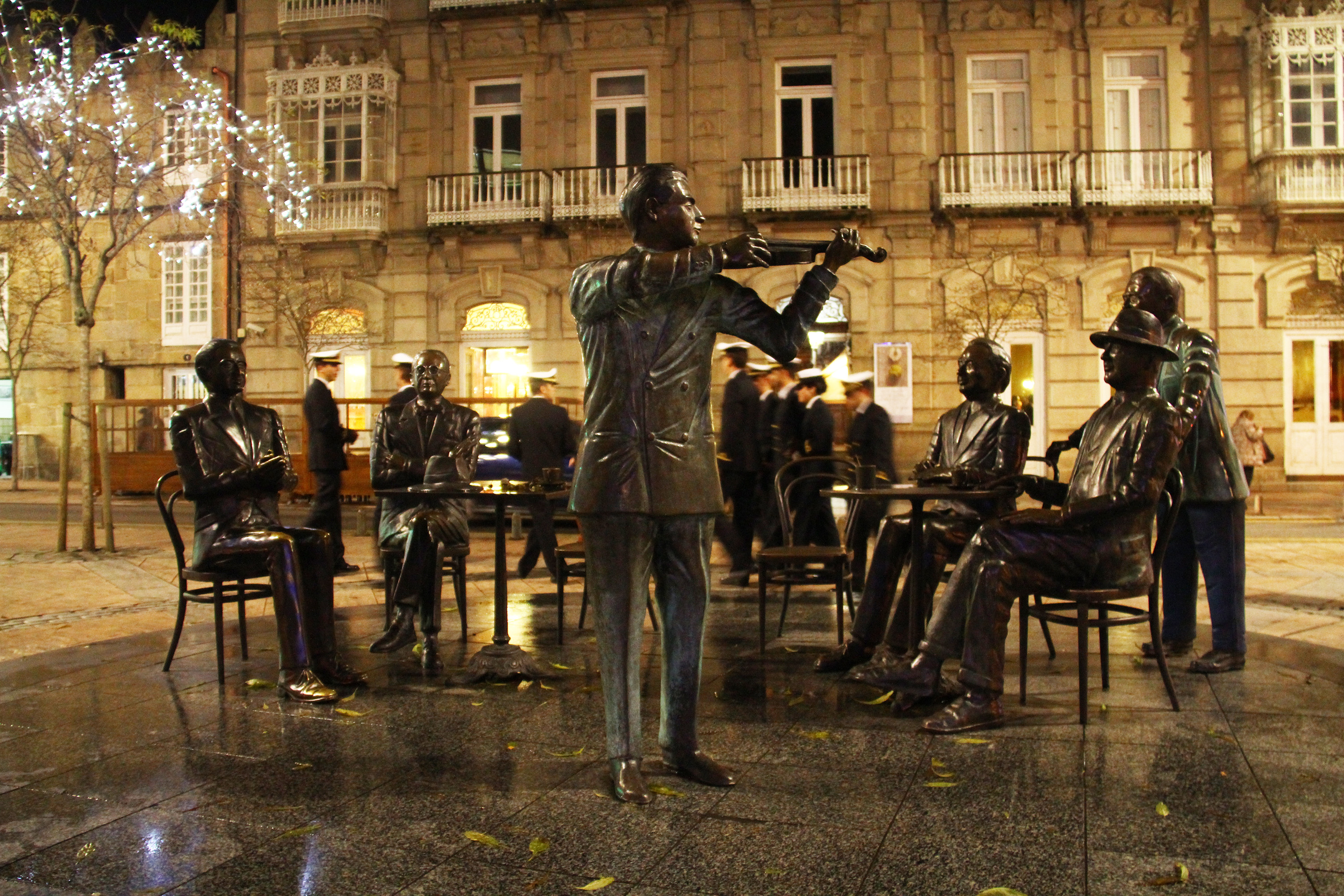
- Tertulia Monument in San José Square
- Native name: Plaza de San José (Spanish)
- Type: plaza
- Maintained by: Pontevedra City Council
- Location: Pontevedra, Spain
- Postal code: 36001
- Coordinates: 42.429444°N 8.645861°W

San José Square or St. Joseph's Square (Spanish: Plaza de San José; Galician: Praza de San Xosé) is a 19th-century square located in the centre of the city of Pontevedra (Spain), in the first urban expansion area, near the Campolongo neighbourhood.

== Origin of the name ==
The square is named after the demolished St. Joseph's Chapel on the southeast side of the square.

== History ==
The square was formed at the end of the 19th century at the junction of the streets Marquis of Riestra, Oliva and Augusto González Besada. It is located in the former St. Joseph's Field, which owes its name to the chapel, now disappeared, which was located on the site currently occupied by the Pontevedra Savings Bank building. In the first half of the 19th century, in the St. Joseph's Field there was an oak grove that formed alleys under the shade of which a livestock fair was held (cattle, pigs, horses and sheep) on the first and fifteenth of each month.

The Baroque Chapel of St. Joseph was built in 1712. It was a medium-sized building whose façade featured the image of St. Joseph in a niche in the upper part of a circular pediment above which were the coats of arms of the Gago and Montenegro families, among others. Its construction is attributed to Pablo Payo Gago de Mendoza y Sotomayor. Important weddings and funerals were celebrated here. It was demolished in the early 1940s because it interfered with the urban development of the city centre.

The square was also the site of the Baroque pazo of the Gago de Mendoza and Montenegro families, which dates from the 15th century. The pazo was on the north side of the square, and its centre was located on the site now occupied by the Café Moderno. Part of the structure remains to the left of the pazo house at the beginning of Oliva Street. In the 1980s, a new floor was added and the original battlements were moved to the top. It had a central tower of three storeys and two lateral towers of two floors with pointed battlements in the centre of which were six-pointed stars inscribed in a circle. The area that is now the square was used centuries ago as the pazo's parade ground. It is the birthplace of the three Gago de Mendoza brothers, distinguished sailors.

On 12 April 1888, the Méndez Núñez Hotel (demolished in the 1980s) was inaugurated on the west side of the square. It had a restaurant and a meeting room. When it closed, it became a bus stop. The hotel was born during the first hotel boom caused by the arrival of the railway in the nearby Station Square. In 1932, the editorial office of the literary magazine Cristal was located in the attic of the hotel and was visited by Federico García Lorca.

In 1902, the building of the Café Moderno was finished, commissioned by Bernardo Martínez Bautista, an emigrant who became rich in Cuba, on the site of the former pazo of the Gago de Mendoza and Montenegro families. In 1903, the Café Moderno was inaugurated on the ground floor with a distinguished atmosphere, a meeting point for meetings and film screenings, and the paving of the square was carried out by the master builder Mr. Miranda. In 1904, the busy square was the setting for a film screening of Ali Baba. In the first decades of the 20th century, the square had a newsstand in its centre and became a cultural epicentre and meeting place for Galician intellectuals.

In December 1943, the renovation of the paving and pavements of the square was approved, as well as the sewage system. In 1944, the Pontevedra Savings Bank acquired a building under construction on the site of the former St. Joseph's Chapel for its provincial headquarters and inaugurated the new building in 1948.

The square was called Plaza de San José until 1931 when it was called Plaza de Pablo Iglesias. On 28 December 1936, the square was renamed Plaza de San José and in democracy it was called Plaza de Calvo Sotelo before it reverted to its traditional name of San José Square on 25 April 1996.

The square was completely redeveloped in 2001 and transformed into a semi-pedestrian area.

In 2006, the Tertulia Monument was installed in the centre of the square, as a tribute to the Galician intellectuals linked to the Café Moderno in the first decades of the 20th century.

== Description ==
The square has an irregular triangular shape and the five streets of Marquis de Riestra, Oliva, Rosalía de Castro, San José and Augusto García Besada converge here. It is one of the focal points of the city's first urban expansion.

The square is paved with alternating grey and sepia-coloured tiles and is semi-pedestrian, with a single lane of traffic in the northern part that channels traffic from Marquis de Riestra Street to Augusto González Besada Street.

The square is dominated to the north by the Café Moderno building, and to the southeast by the Pontevedra Savings Bank building. In the middle of the square, on a base of polished black granite, stands the Tertulia monument, created in 2006 by the sculptor César Lombera to commemorate the meetings held here by Galician intellectuals. Above the building of the Pontevedra Savings Bank overlooking the square is the statue of Teucer, the mythical founder of the city, also created in 2006 by the sculptor Cándido Pazos.

The square has a total of sixteen trees: five Chinese magnolias, three Siberian crab apple trees and three red apple trees, both grafted onto native apple varieties, as well as five apple trees grafted onto Asian apple trees.

== Outstanding buildings ==
On the northwest side of the square are the remains of the Baroque pazo of the Gago de Mendoza and Montenegro families, which currently has two floors. Its pointed battlements stand out in the upper part, decorated in the centre with six-pointed stars inscribed in a circle.

On the north side of the square and next to the old pazo of the Gago de Mendoza family is the Café Moderno building, with an eclectic stone façade and the most important art nouveau interior in the city. It has three floors, housing the Café Moderno on the ground floor. The façade has wrought iron galleries and geometrically shaped ornamental elements.

On the southeast side of the square is the central building of the Pontevedra Savings Bank. It is a majestic stone building with four floors and a ground floor. The large hall, which can be accessed from the main entrance, connects the different areas of the building.

== Gallery ==
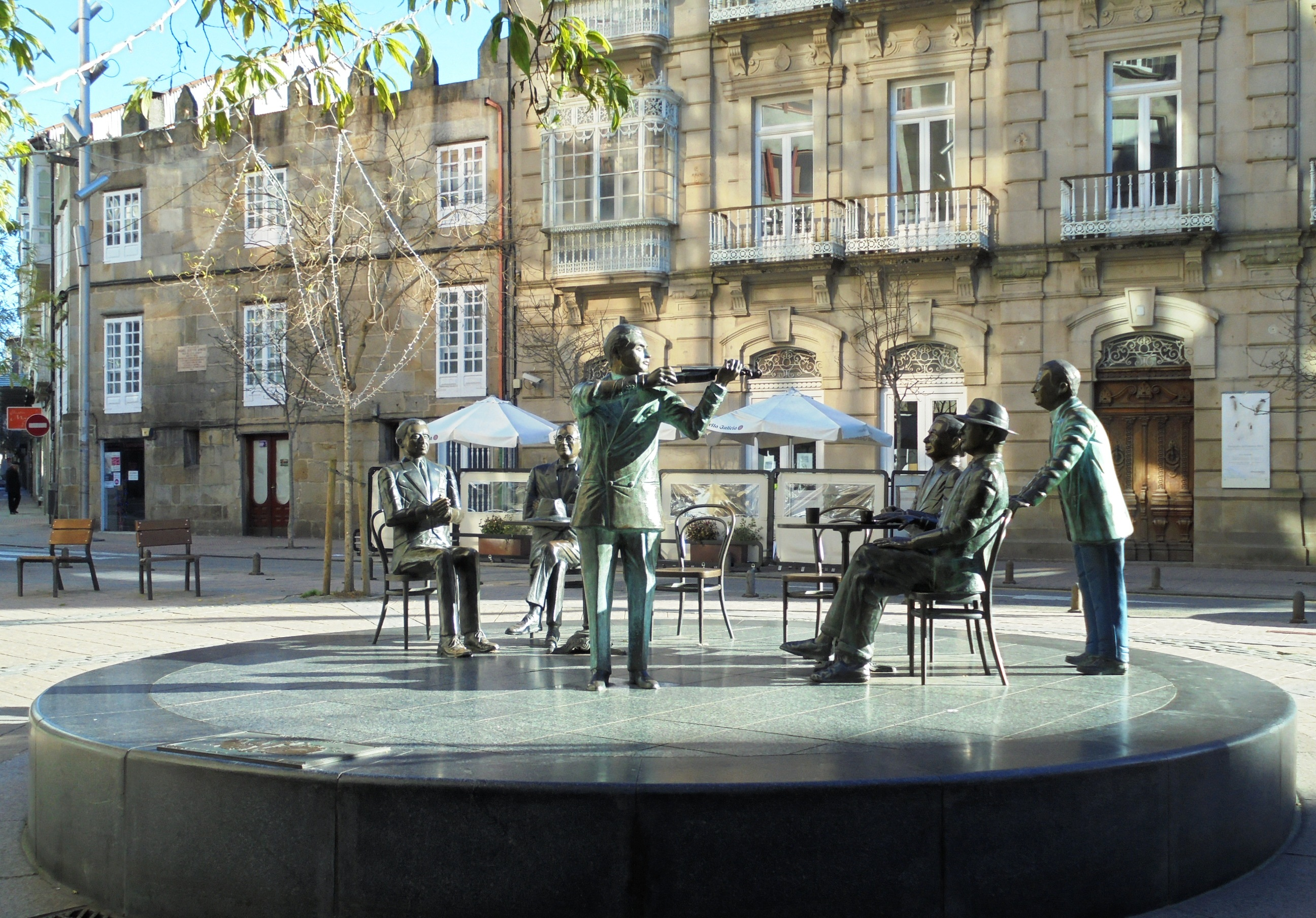
Remains of the crenellated pazo of the Gago de Mendoza family in the left background

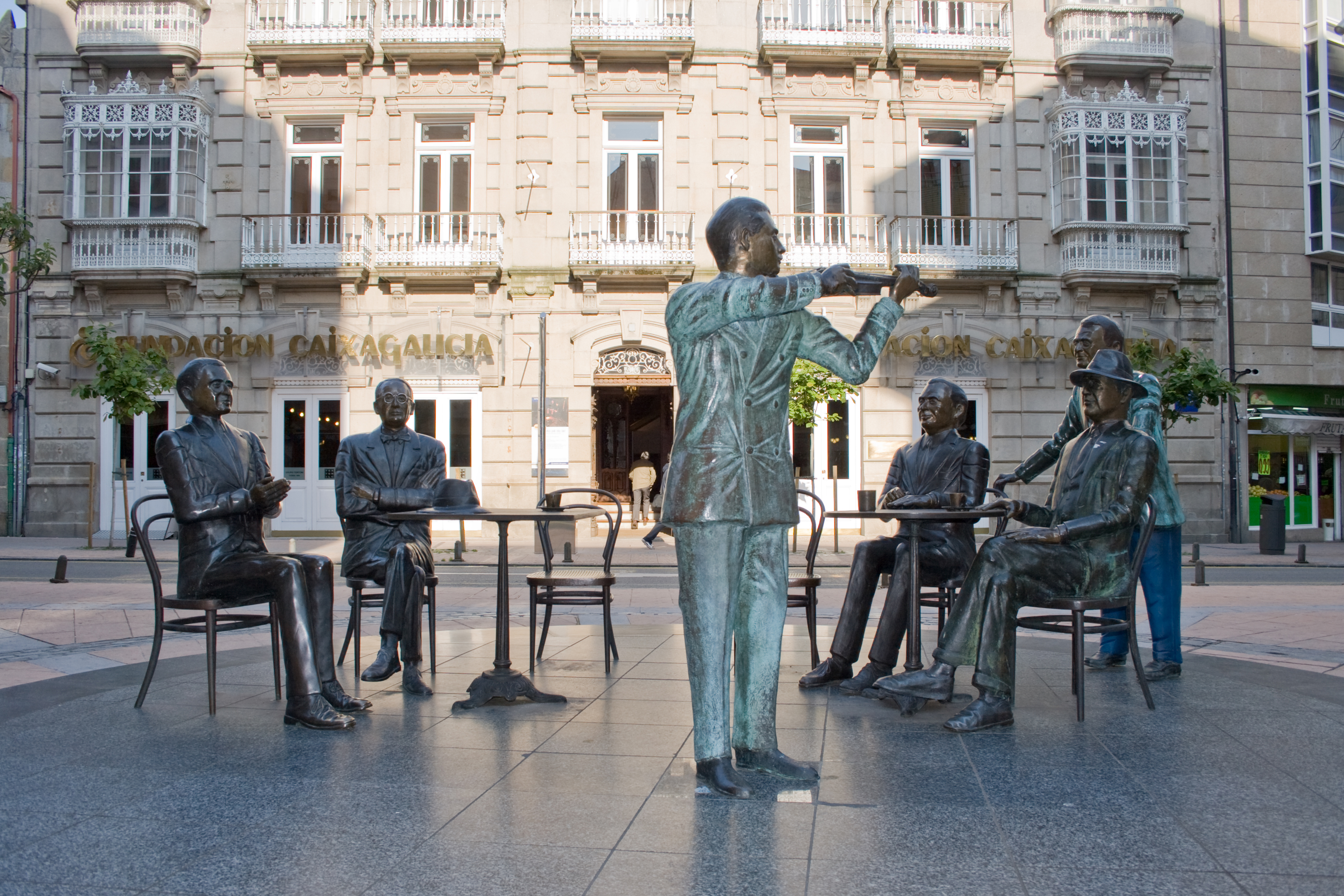
Tertulia Monument in the centre of the square

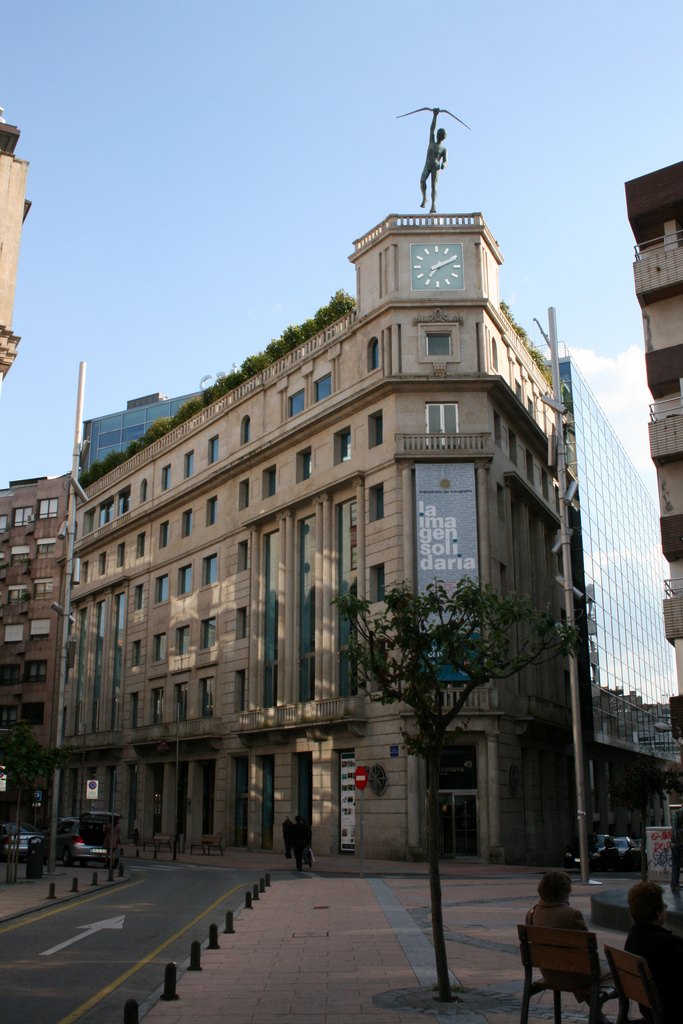
Caixa de Pontevedra building on the southeast side of the square

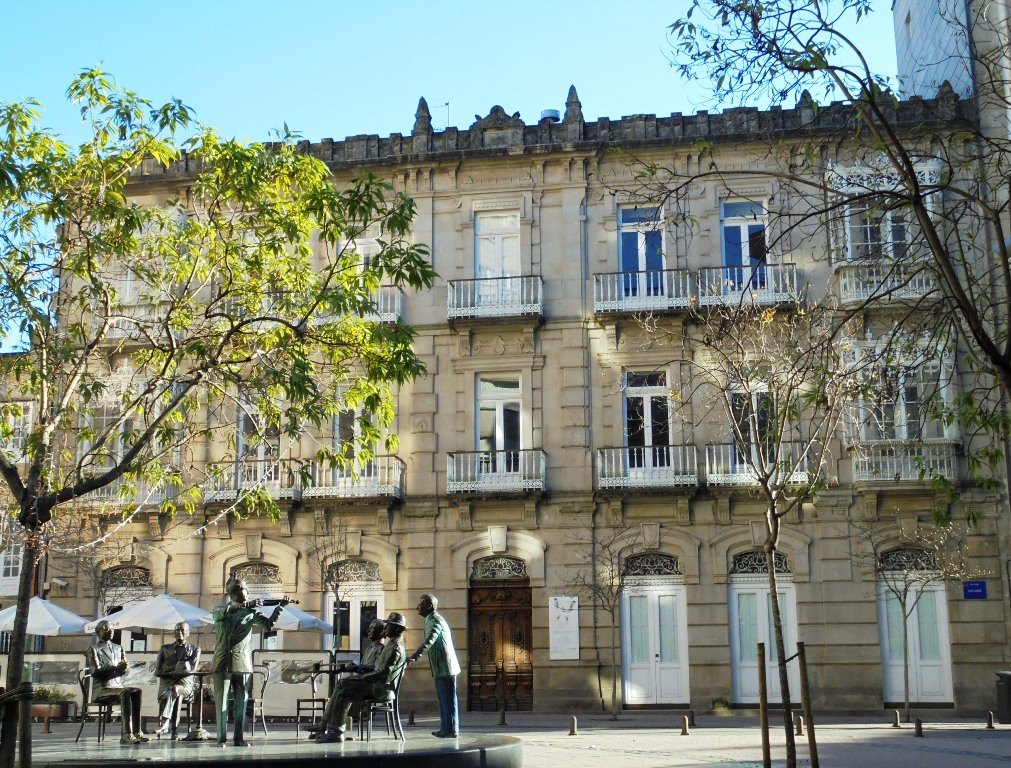
The Café Moderno on the north side of the square

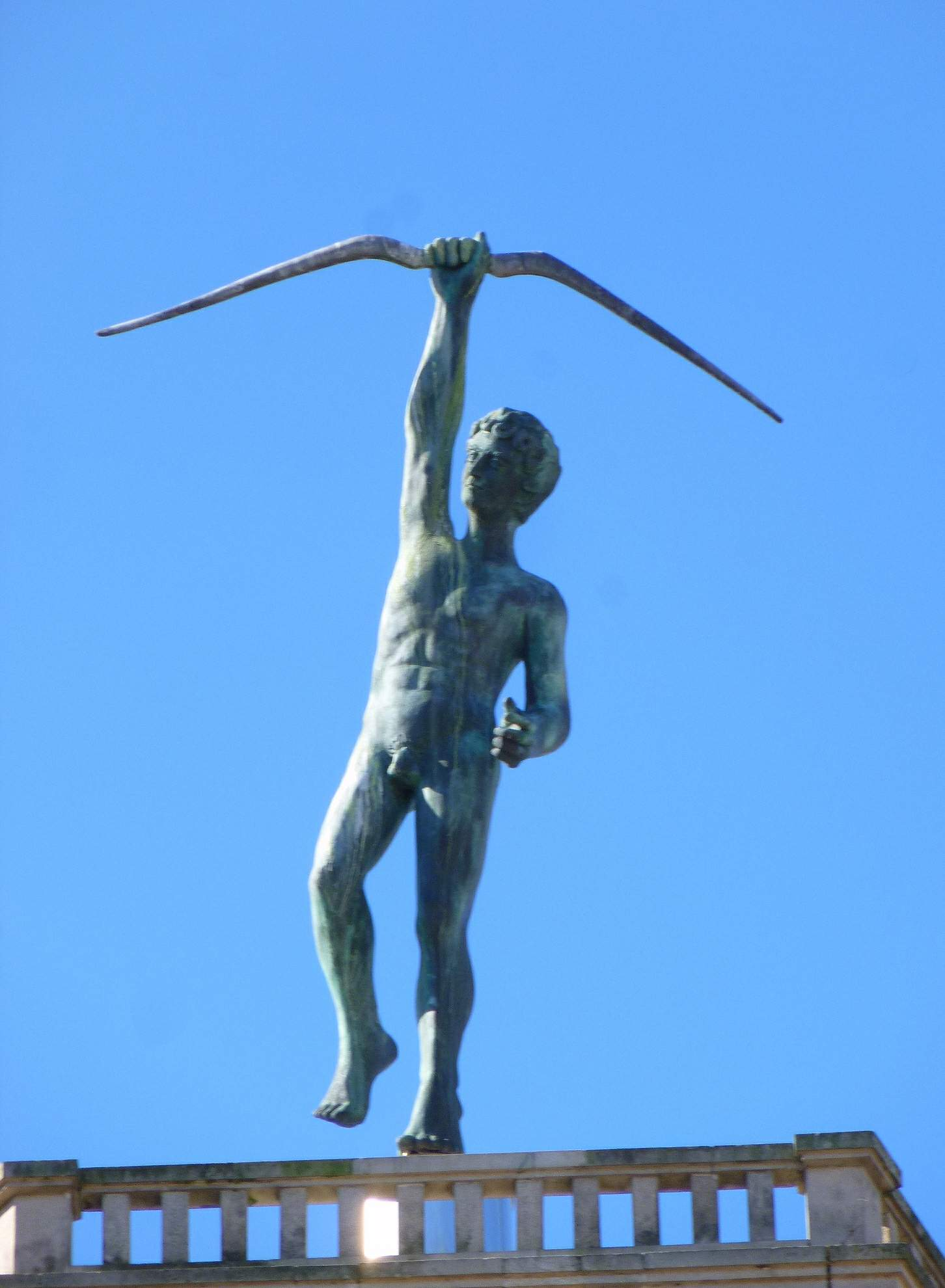
Teucer statue overlooking the square

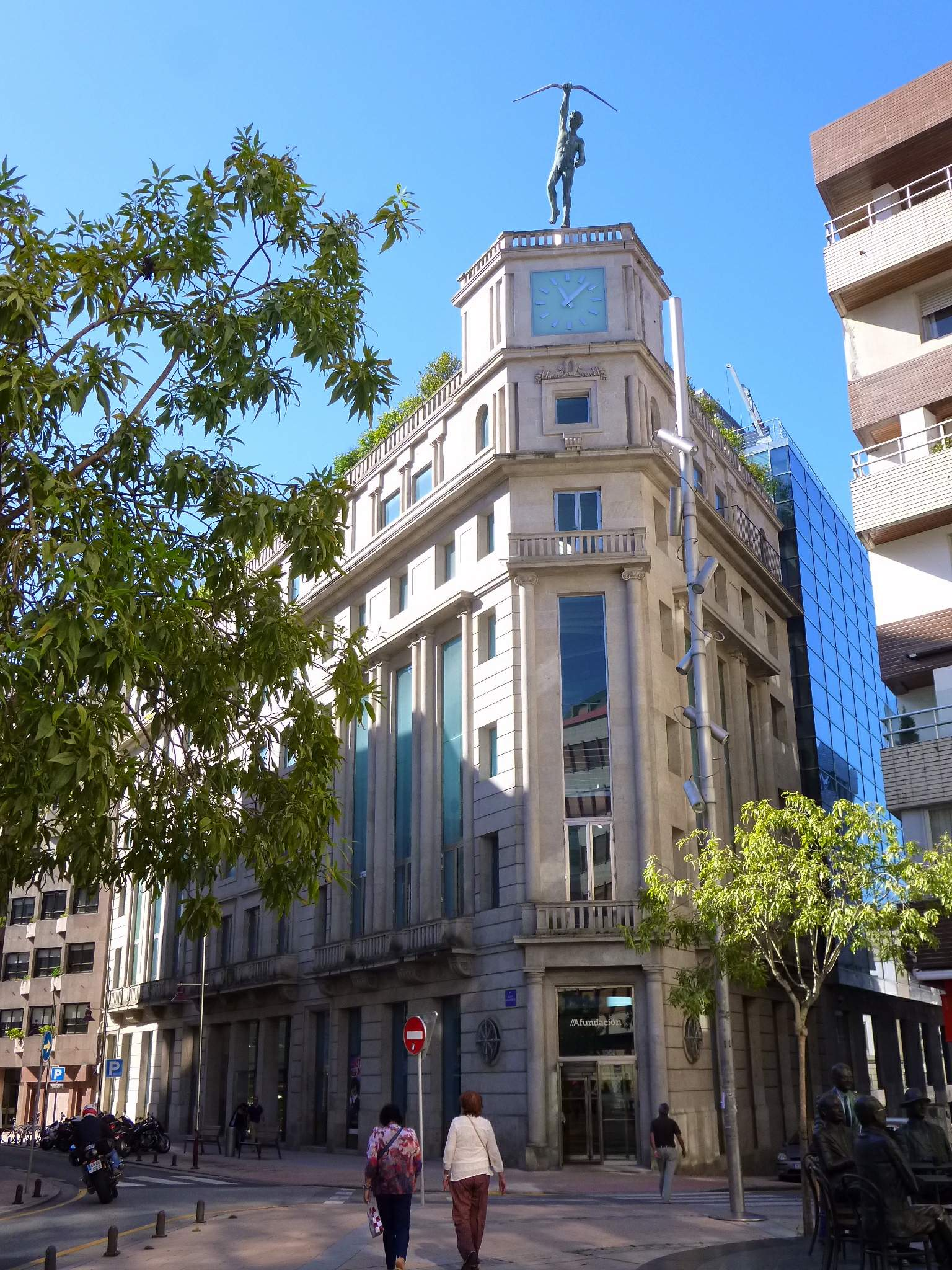
Caixa de Pontevedra building

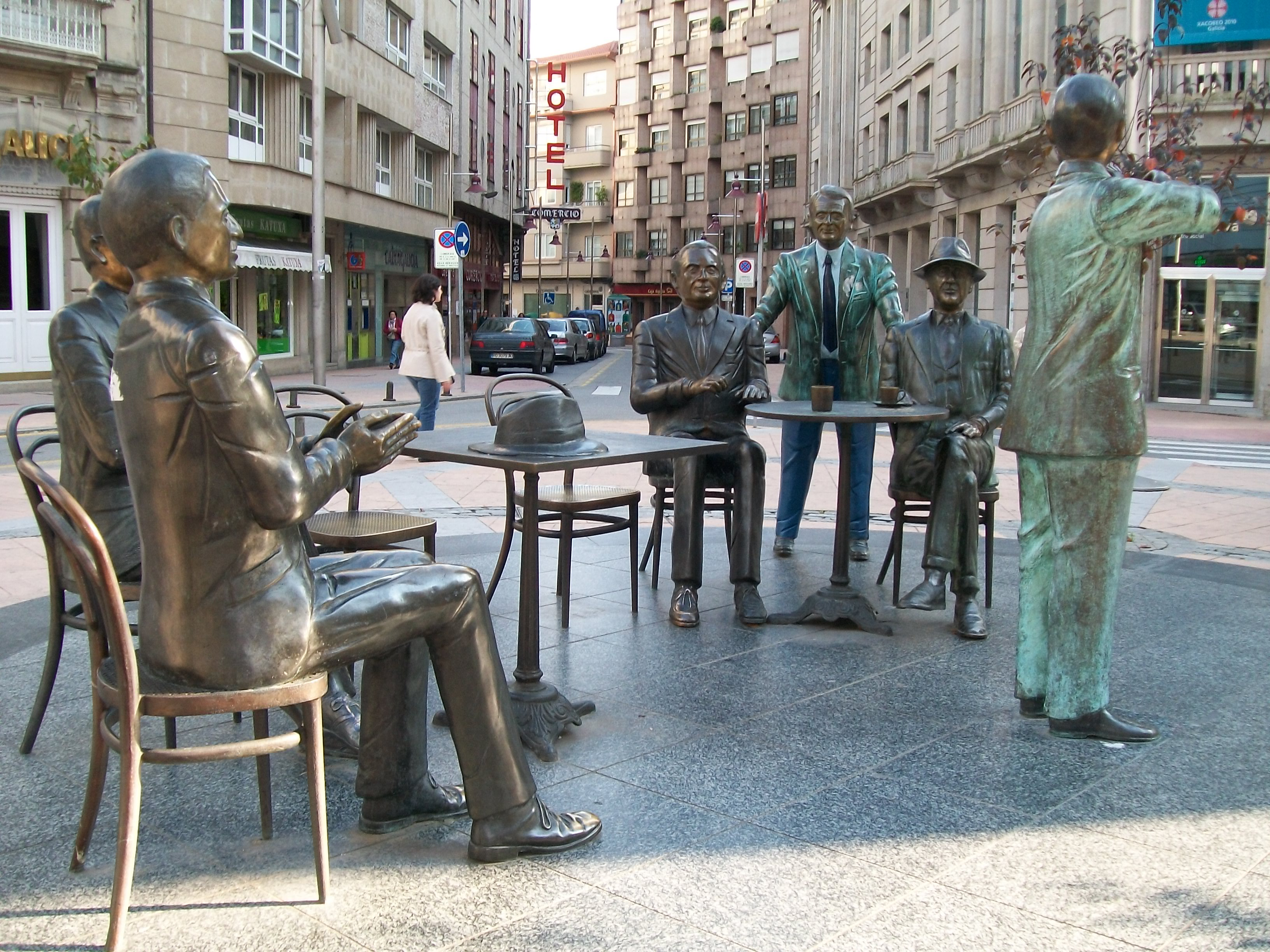
Tertulia monument
