= María Inmaculada Paz-Andrade =

Spanish physicist (1928–2022)

María Inmaculada Paz-Andrade (Pontevedra, 14 November 1928 – Pontevedra, 24 November 2022) was a Spanish physicist and researcher. She was the first person to be named a professor of the Compostela Faculty of Physics, and became an international authority in microcalorimetry, which is a technique for the measurement of very small quantities of heat.

== Life and work ==
Paz-Andrade (sometimes written as Paz Andrade) earned a doctorate in physics (1963) and became a Professor of Applied Physics (specializing in Thermodynamics) and a researcher at the University of Santiago de Compostela. She also earned a certificate of higher studies at the University of Marseille (France). She furthered her studies at the University of Manchester (UK) (where she was the first woman to be appointed a visiting research professor) and at the Institute of Microcalorimetry and Thermogenesis of the French National Centre for Scientific Research (CNRS) in Marseille.

Having learned about microcalorimetry abroad, in 1964 she was the first to teach the subject to researchers in Spain. Specifically, she carried out work on applied thermodynamics, calorimetric studies and determinations of specific heat of solids and liquids. At the University of Santiago de Compostela, she served as department director of Fundamental Physics at the Faculty of Sciences (1964–1970 and 1972–1974) and then director of the Department of Applied Physics (1986–1992).

In 1999 she created the multidisciplinary THOR group, to develop computer tools to fight against forest fires in all their stages in Galicia and Santiago de Compostela. In 1999, more than 40 specialists from different universities were collaborating in the group.

In 2018, Paz-Andrade was awarded an Honorary doctorate from the University of Vigo.

Paz-Andrade authored more than 200 scientific publications and supervised 39 doctoral theses.

She was the niece of Valentín Paz-Andrade.

== Honors ==
- Gold Medal of the Royal Spanish Society of Physics (1992)
- Antonio Casares and Rodrigo Galicia Research Award (1999)
- Gold badge of the University of Santiago de Compostela (2000)
- Castelao Medal, awarded by the Government of Galicia (2008).
- Arts. presented in honor of Professor María Inmaculada Paz Andrade. Vol. 26, No. 8 of Journal of chemical thermodynamics. Publisher Academic Press, 911 pp. 1994
- Maria Josefa Wonenburger Planells Prize, awarded by the Government of Galicia (2008).
- Honorary doctorate from the University of Vigo (2018)
