= Teucer (statue) =

Statue in Pontevedra, Spain

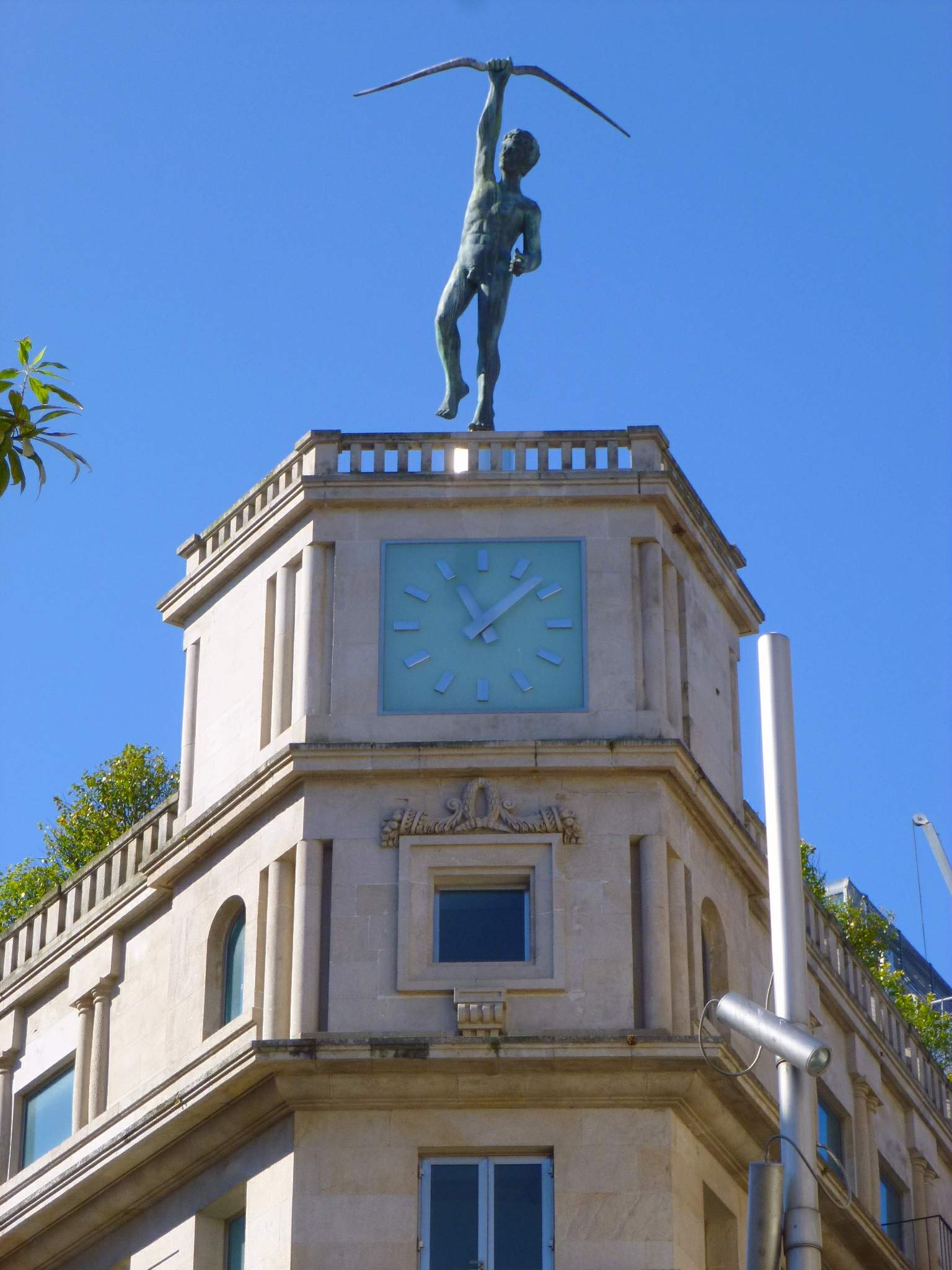
- The statue in 2016
- Artist: Cándido Pazos
- Completion date: 15 July 2006; 20 years ago
- Medium: Bronze
- Subject: Teucer
- Condition: Good
- Location: Pontevedra, Spain; 42°25′45.0″N 8°38′45.3″W

Teucer is a statue created by the Spanish sculptor Cándido Pazos, located in Pontevedra (Spain). It is located in Saint Joseph's Square above the clock of the central building of the former Provincial Savings Bank of Pontevedra and was inaugurated on 15 July 2006.

== History ==
Teucer is the mythical founder of the city of Pontevedra. Legend has it that the mythical archer Teucer, son of King Telamon (King of Salamis), followed a mermaid, Leucoiña, in exile to the Ria de Pontevedra and then founded the city.

Before the foundation of the city, Teucer, together with his half brother Ajax and his cousin Achilles, had gone to the Trojan War. But when this long war was over and they returned to their country, the heroes were not well received, even by their own families. Teucer, rejected by his father, went in search of a new homeland in the West and arrived in Iberia, travelled along the coast of Hispania, crossed the Strait of Gibraltar and founded a Greek colony called Hellenes, which would become Pontevedra.

== Description ==
The sculpture is made of bronze and is 6 metres high.

It weighs 2 tons and is anchored by means of a steel spike to the small clock pavilion in the upper part of the Savings Bank of Pontevedra building. The sculpture gives a sensation of lightness that suggests it is floating in the air in a vacuum.

Teucer is depicted as a young naked athlete with a modernist bow and the expression of having reached his destination.

== Teucer in the city ==
The city named the oldest square in the old town centre Teucer in 1843, which had previously been called Town Square or Bread Square.

On the façade of the Pontevedra City Hall (1880) there is an inscription about the foundation of the town by the Greek archer Teucer.

In the Basilica of Saint Mary Major there is a statue of Teucer carrying the cudgel at the top of the right buttress of its main façade. In 1956, a granite statue of Teucer breaking the jaws of the Nemean lion with a cross behind it was added to the arch of the fountain that closes the square of the Pilgrim Virgin Church.

== Gallery ==
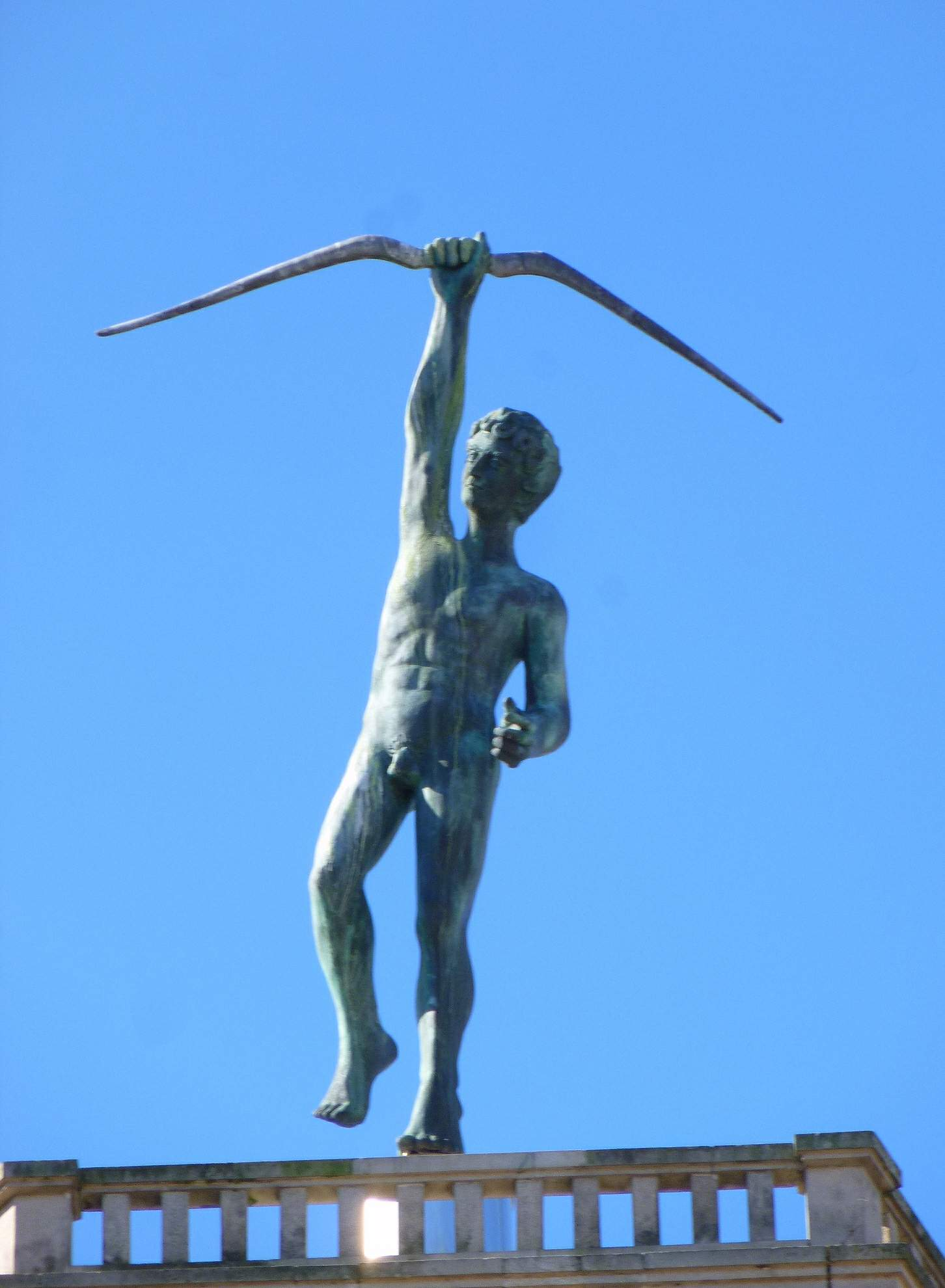
Statue of Teucer

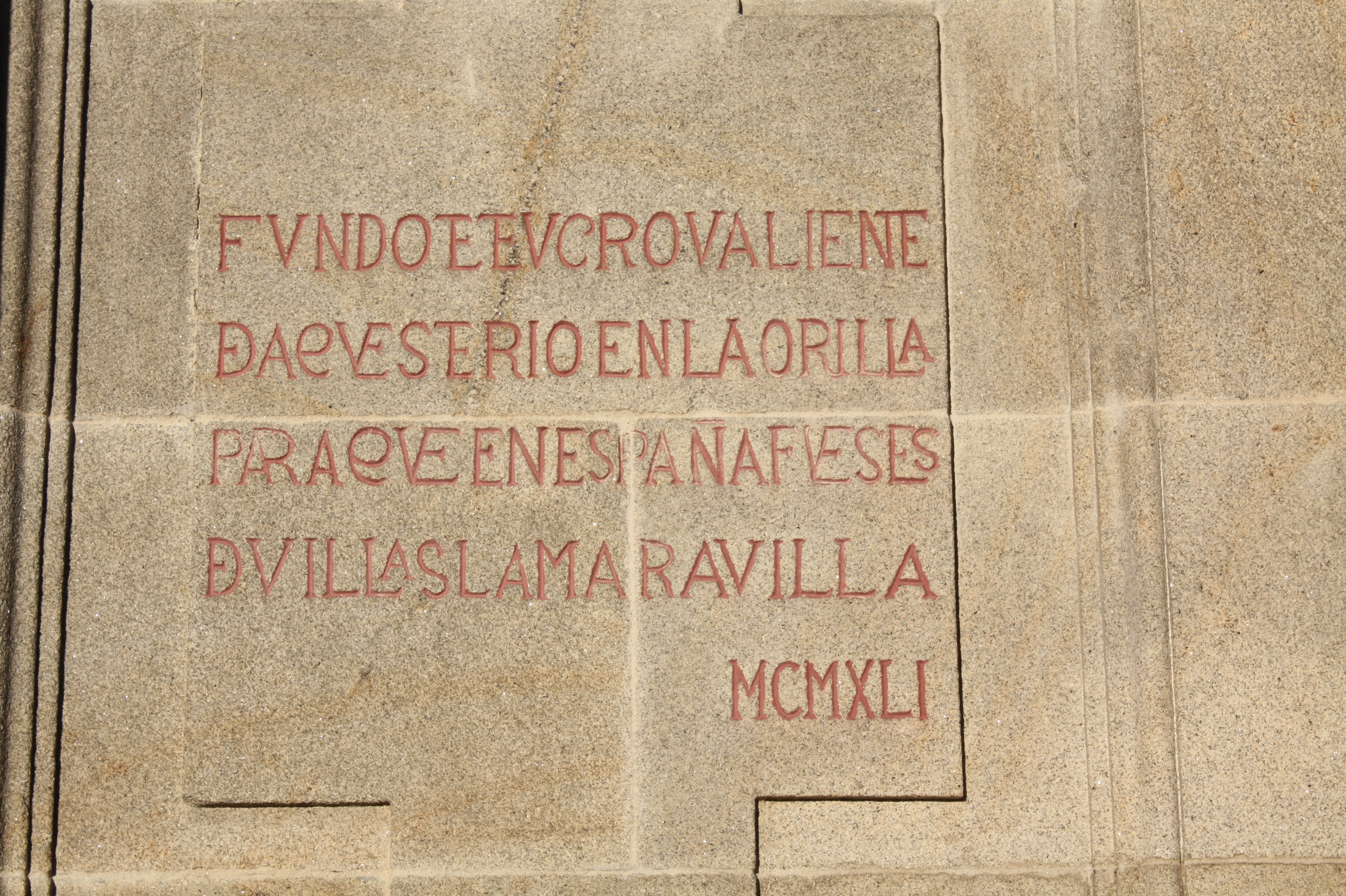
Inscription on the façade of the city hall.

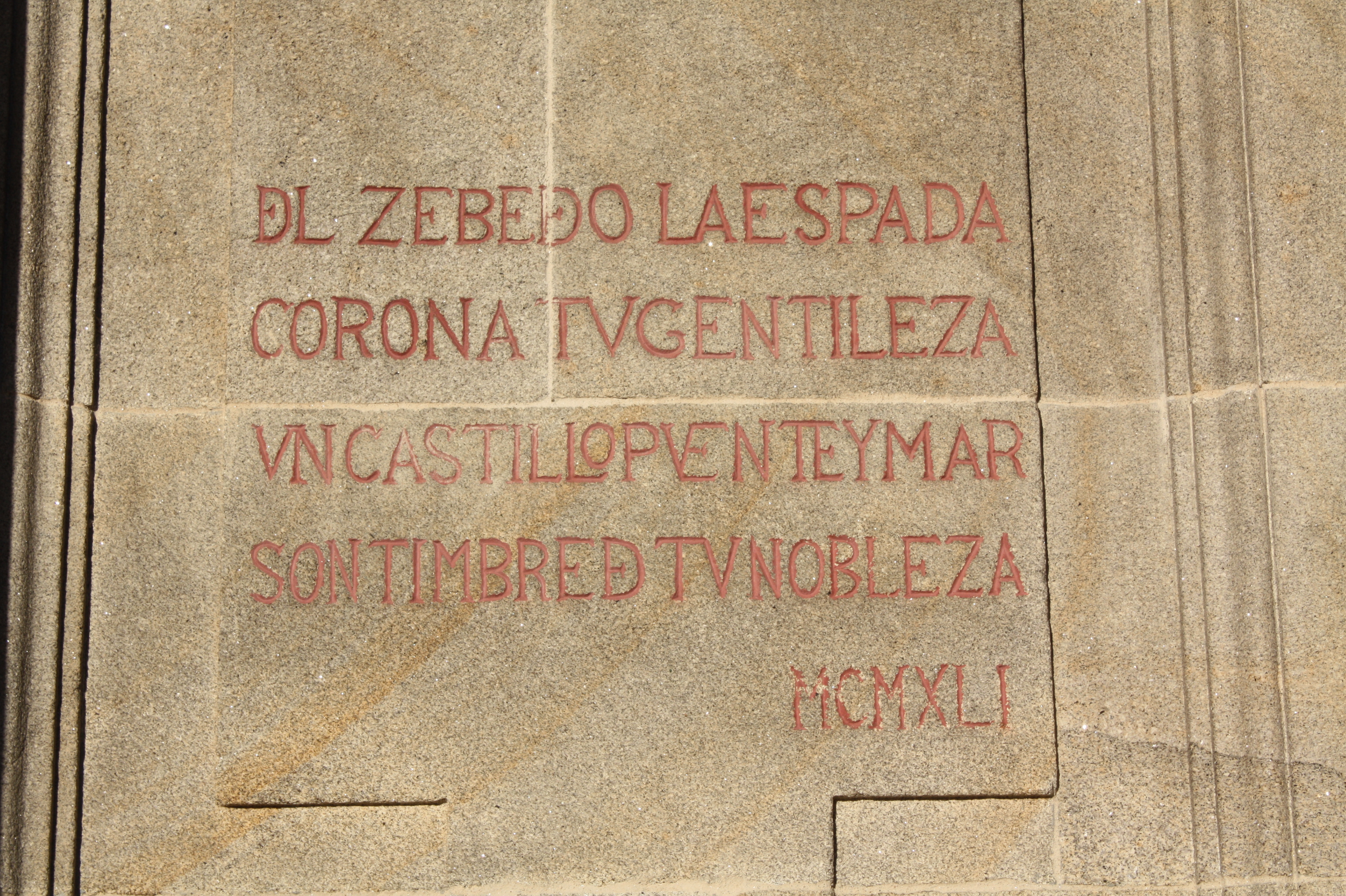
Inscription on the façade of the city hall (continued).

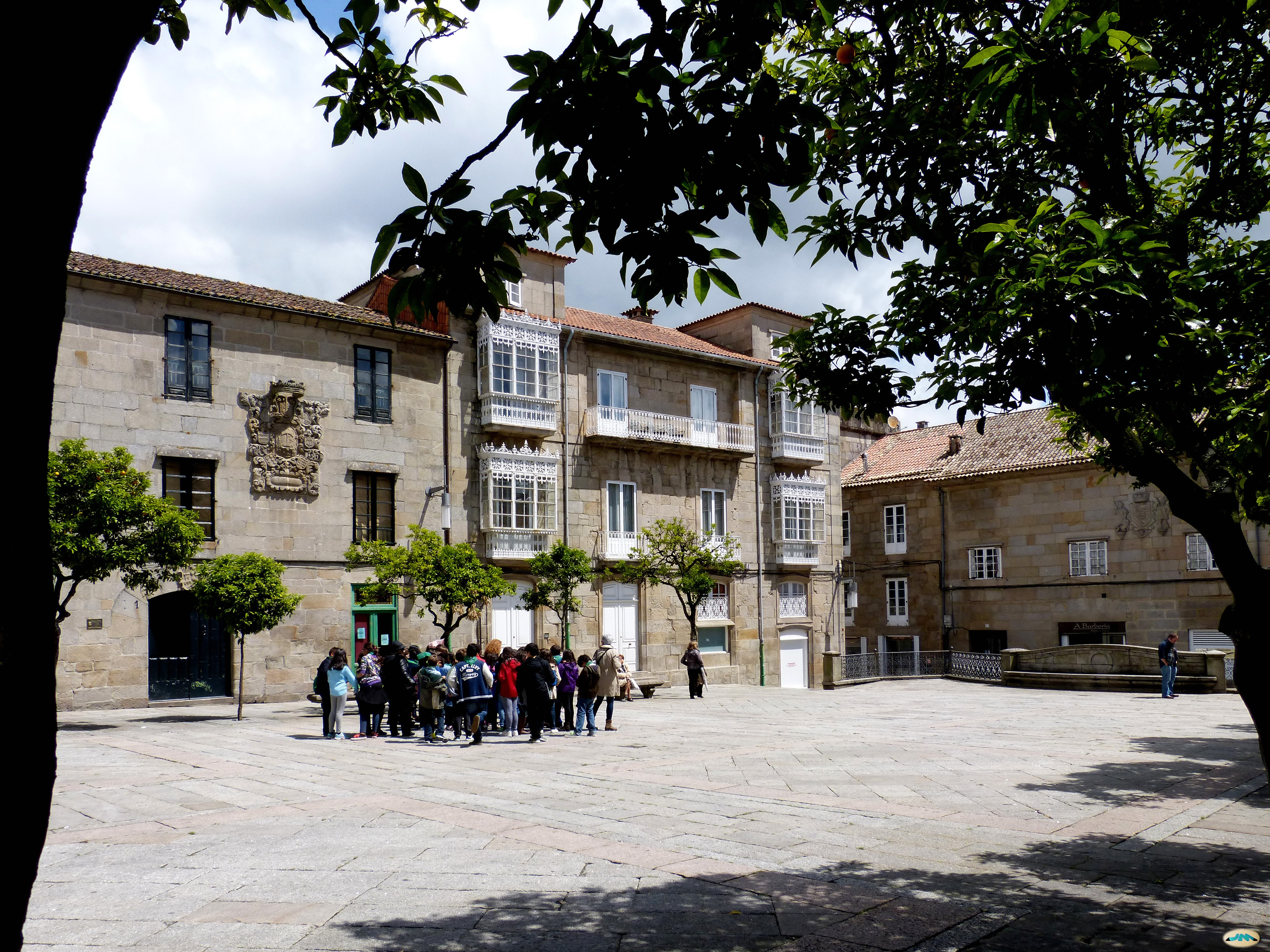
Teucer Square

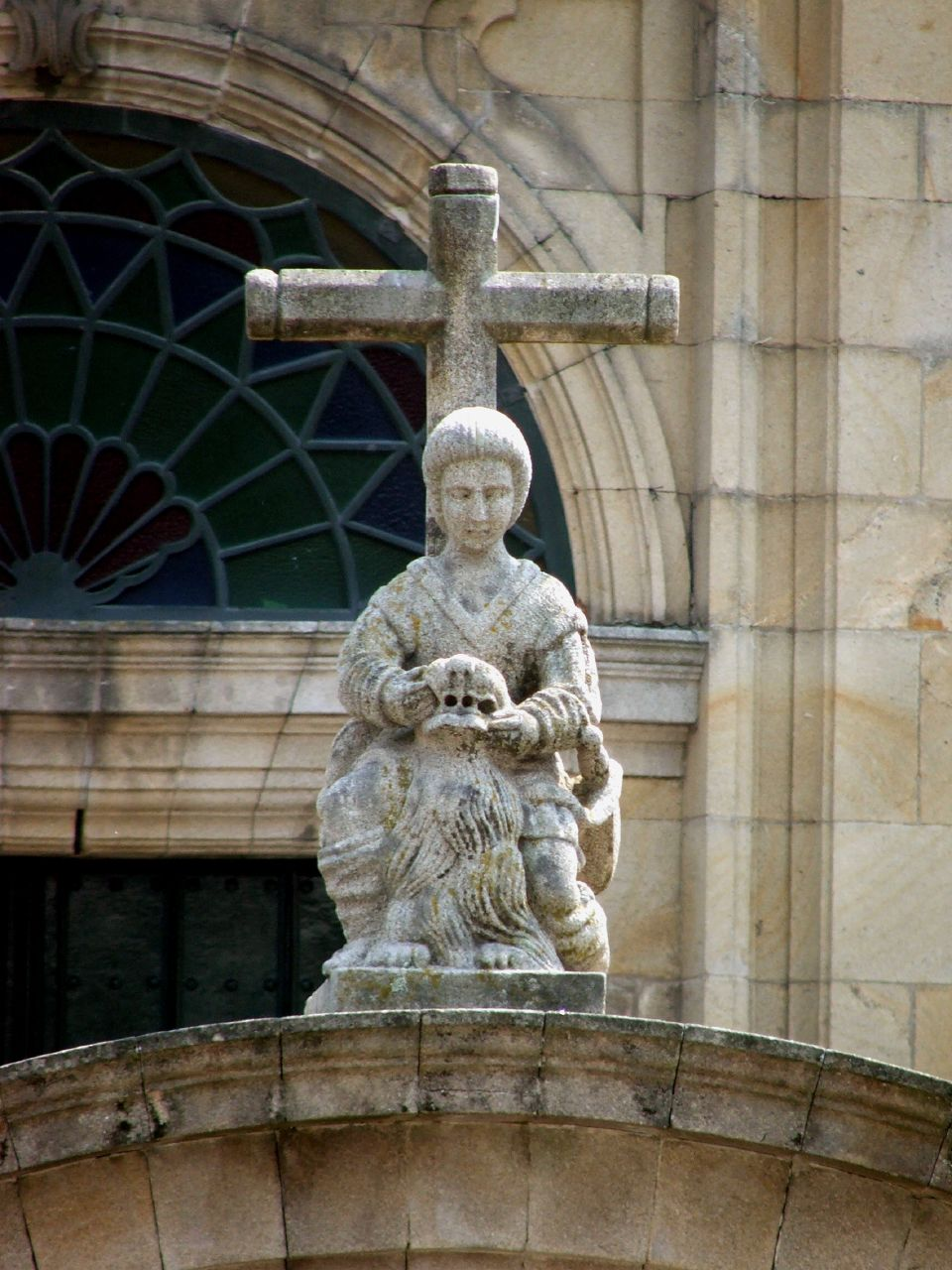
Statue of Teucer on the square of the church of the Pilgrim Virgin

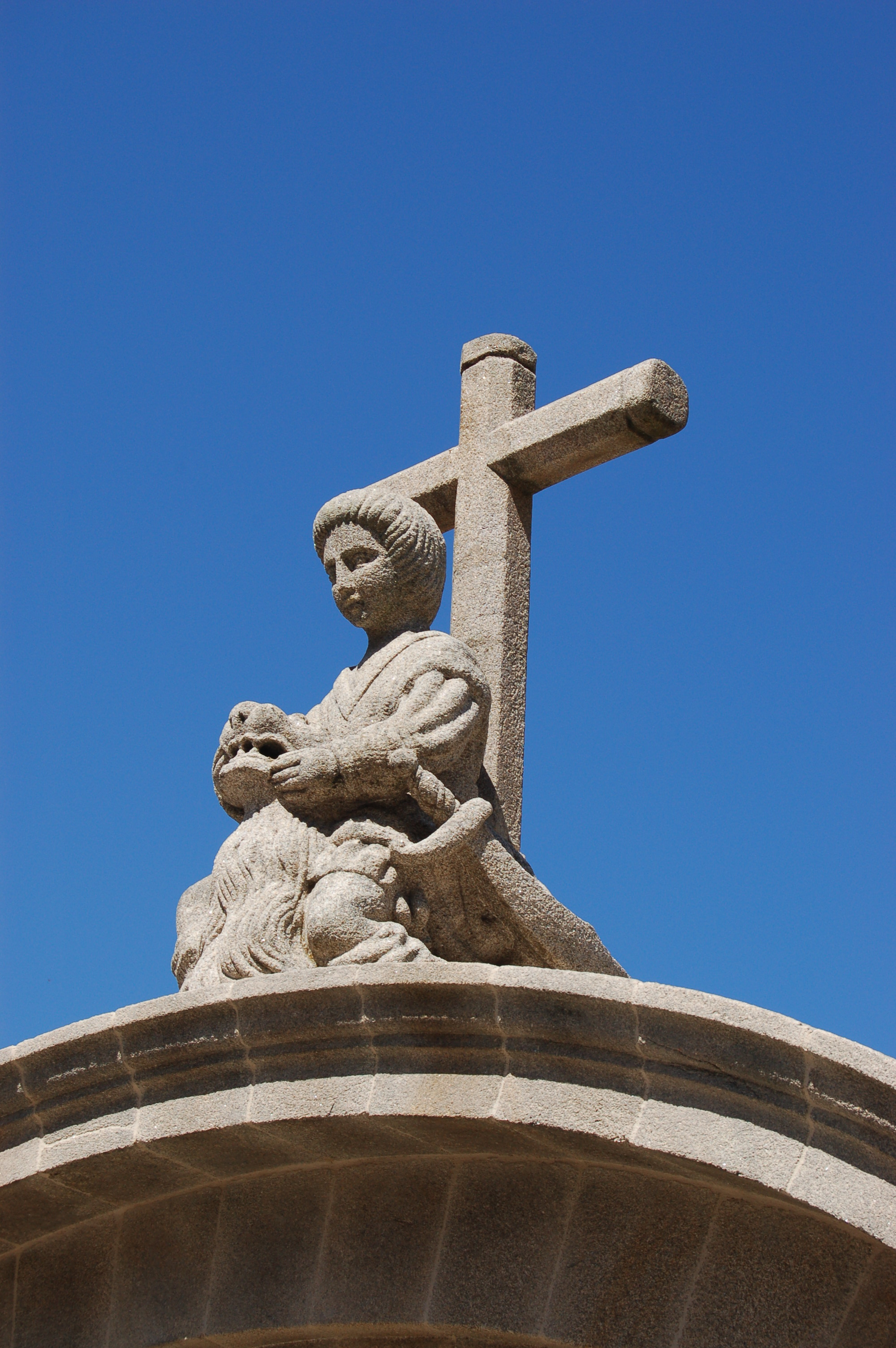

== Bibliography ==
- Aganzo, Carlos (2010). Pontevedra. Ciudades con encanto (in Spanish). Madrid: El País-Aguilar. p. 100-101;118-119. ISBN 978-8403509344.
- Durán Villa, Francisco (2000). Provincia de Pontevedra (in Spanish). Madrid: Editorial Mediterráneo. p. 76. ISBN 8471563371.
- González y Zúñiga, Claudio (1846). Historia de Pontevedra, o sea de la antigua Helenes fundada por Teucro (in Spanish). Pontevedra: Establecimiento Tipográfico de la Viuda de Pintos.

== See also ==
=== Related articles ===
- Teucer
- Plaza de San José
- Plaza de Teucro
- Caixa de Pontevedra

=== External links ===
- on the website Guía Repsol Pontevedra
