= Valentín Paz Andrade =

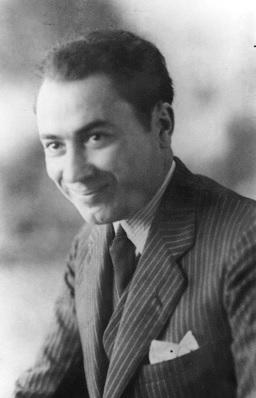
- Valentín Paz Andrade, ca. 1937.
- Born: Valentín Paz Andrade; 23 April 1898; Pontevedra, Galicia
- Died: 19 May 1987 (aged 89); Vigo, Galicia
- Citizenship: Spanish
- Education: Law
- Alma mater: University of Santiago de Compostela
- Occupations: Lawyer, writer, politician and businessman
- Spouse: Pilar Rodríguez de Prada
- Children: Afonso Paz-Andrade Rodríguez
- Relatives: Matilde Andrade Tojeiro (mother)<vr>Francisco Paz Cochón (father); María Inmaculada Paz-Andrade (niece)
- Writing career
- Language: Galician

Valentín Paz Andrade (b. Pontevedra, 23 April 1898 – Vigo, 19 May 1987) was a Galician lawyer, writer, politician, journalist, poet, businessman and economist.

Galician Literature Day is dedicated to him in 2012.

== Works ==
Boletín Oficial de las Cortes.

- Pranto matricial (1955) ISBN 978-84-85134-04-5.
- Los derechos sobre el espacio marítimo (1960) ISBN 978-84-290-0260-7.
- La anunciación de Valle-Inclán (1967) ISBN 978-84-7339-537-3.
- Sementeira do vento (1968) ISBN 978-84-7154-087-4.
- La marginacíón de Galicia (1970) ISBN 978-84-323-0027-1.
- X. R. Barreiro Fernández, F. Díaz-Fierros ..., Los Gallegos, (1976), La sociedad y la economía, (1975), pp. 45–93.
- A galecidade na obra de Guimarães Rosa (1978) ISBN 978-84-85134-92-2.
- Cen chaves de sombra (1979) ISBN 978-84-7492-007-9.
- Castelao na luz e na sombra (1982) ISBN 978-84-7492-130-4.
- Galiza lavra a sua imagem (1985) ISBN 978-84-7492-258-5.
- O legado xornalístico de Valentín Paz-Andrade (1997) ISBN 978-84-88254-53-5.
- Epistolario, (1997) ISBN 978-84-7492-841-9.
