= Campolongo (Pontevedra) =

Neighbourhood in Pontevedra, Spain

- Neighbourhood of Pontevedra
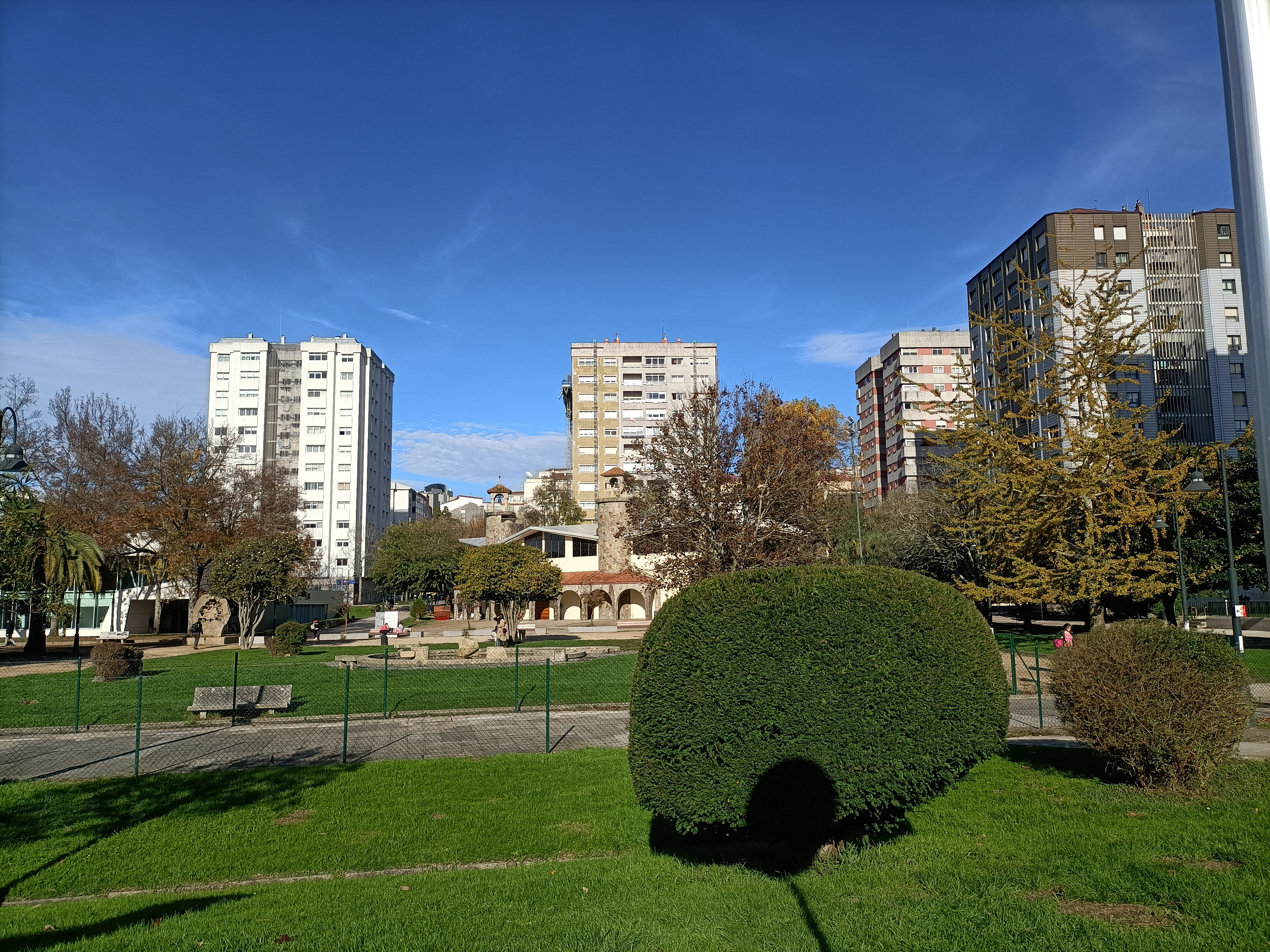
- Campolongo with its 12-storey buildings
- Interactive map of Campolongo
- Coordinates: 42°25′37.7″N 8°38′40.5″W
- Country: Spain
- City: Pontevedra

Population
  - Total: 7,000
- Postal code: 36001, 36003

Campolongo is a neighbourhood in the city of Pontevedra (Spain). It has a residential, administrative, educational and commercial function.

== Location ==
The Campolongo neighbourhood is located in the south and southwest of the city of Pontevedra. It is bounded to the north by Augusto García Sanchez Avenue and the Gafos River, to the south by the PO-10, to the east by Alcalde Hevia street and to the west by Rosalía de Castro street. The northern part of the neighbourhood has many green areas and is currently in the city centre. The Gafos River runs through the neighbourhood.

== History ==
Until the 1950s, the Pazo de Campolongo, located in Iglesias Vilarelle Street, was surrounded by large fields, which gave the neighbourhood its name (Campolongo = Long Field). Then in the 1960s Francisco Franco ordered it to be transferred stone by stone to the Casa de Campo (Madrid).

In the 1950s, the area was home to the city's railway station, where the Plaza de Galicia is now located, and the railway tracks occupied what is now Augusto García Sánchez Avenue. The old station was in use until 3 July 1966. At the end of the 1960s, this station was dismantled and relocated to the Gorgullón neighbourhood. The new military buildings in Pontevedra, designed in 1965 by the architect Xosé Bar Boo, were built in this area between 1966 and 1969.

In August 1960, the Department of Urban Planning of the Ministry of Housing in Madrid decided to entrust a study for the preliminary phase of the so-called Polígono de Campolongo (Campolongo Land Development Area) to the architects Julio Cano Lasso, Fernando Moreno Barberá and Juan Gómez González. Campolongo, with 132,000 square metres next to the city centre, was the ideal space for the city's expansion. The official announcement of the approval of the Polígono de Campolongo took place on 22 December 1961.

In October 1968, the plan was made available to the public for a month at the Provincial Housing Office and in the following months, the development of the land began thanks to the National Housing Plan.

Later, in 1970, the Gafos River was canalized and a large promenade was created above it in December 1970 In 1971 the General Director of Housing, Martín Eyries Valmaseda, accompanied by the first provincial authorities, visited the Campolongo neighbourhood, together with the Mayor Augusto García Sánchez. In 1972 the Campolongo Primary School was built. In 1975, the Pontevedra City Council officially received from the General Director of the National Housing Institute, Ramón Andrada Pfeiffer, the completion of the urbanisation of the neighbourhood. In 1976, 1977 and the following years, many of the buildings on Augusto García Sánchez Avenue were built. A central park was laid out and in 1979, construction began on the St. Joseph's Church, which was inaugurated on 23 October 1983.

In 1996, the city council cut down the eucalyptus trees in Campolongo near what is now María Victoria Moreno Avenue and created a new park on the land where they were located.

The old artillery barracks were demolished in 2005 (the land to build it had been expropriated in 1924 for this purpose). In its place, the Administrative Complex of Pontevedra was built, inaugurated in 2008, which houses the provincial offices of the Galician Government and the provincial Tax Office and several residential buildings, in addition to the new military sports centre and a post office.

In the 2010s a modern weather station was installed in the district.

In 2019, a new children's playground was opened. The Campolongo sports centre, the city's largest, was also completely renovated by the BeOne Sport and Fitness chain and opened in 2020.

Nowadays, the southern part of the district is occupied by subdivisions and single-family houses. In the residential area of San Blas there is a chapel dedicated to this saint, built in the 18th and 19th centuries. In the 1990s, San Blas changed its appearance, thanks to the construction of houses in its lower part and the construction of a Carrefour Planet hypermarket in its upper part.

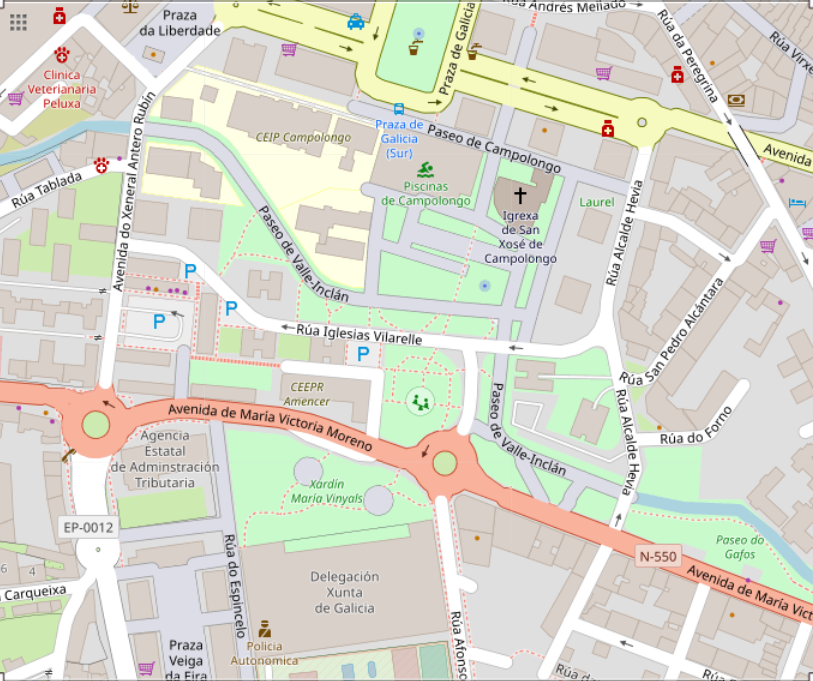
Campolongo map

== Urban planning ==
Campolongo is a central area of Pontevedra that is organised around three squares: the Plaza de Galicia (with a fountain in the middle and a large bus shelter on the south side), the Plaza de la Libertad behind the Courthouse or Palacio de Justicia (where the Statue of Liberty is located) and the Plaza de la Constitución, in front of the Church of San José, where the monument to the Spanish Constitution of 1978 is located. Campolongo is also dotted with the Campolongo Park, where there is a large children's playground with a zip line and swings and slides, as well as a fountain and a Galician granary on stilts in two of the green areas, and the María Vinyals Park in front of the Provincial Administrative Centre of Pontevedra.

The city centre is also organised by two parallel axes running east–west: Augusto García Sanchez Avenue and María Victoria Moreno, and two parallel axes running north–south: General Antero Rubín Avenue and Alcalde Hevia street.

== Facilities ==
=== Schools and educational institutions ===
Campolongo has an important educational heritage, as it is home to several of the city's schools:

- The ONCE Educational Resource Centre in the south of the district, one of the five ONCE educational centres in Spain (the one in the northwest of the country). The ONCE Educational Resource Centre was set up in the town in 1941, in the former Marist school, high school and boarding school, surrounded by the La Florida estate. The school began to function as such in 1943.
- The Campolongo Primary School (CEP) was built in 1972 and started its activity in 1973. At that time it was one of the most innovative schools for children aged 6 to 14 in Galicia.
- The Campolongo Nursery School (small, medium and large sections) opened in 1981 and was renamed the Concepción Crespo Rivas School in 1997 by the Galician Government.

=== Government offices ===
Most of the city's government offices and agencies are located in the area:

- The Administrative centre of the Provincial Offices of the Galician Government, in a large 9-storey building with twin towers designed by the architect Manuel Gallego Jorreto, inaugurated in 2008 in Maria Victoria Moreno Avenue in front of María Vinyals Park.
- The Provincial Tax Office in a new building inaugurated in 2010 and designed by the architect Rafael Caballero Sánchez-Izquierdo.
- The provincial office of the Spanish National Institute of Statistics in Iglesias Vilarelle street.
- The Provincial Office of the Department of Territorial Policy, Public Works and Transport of the Galician Government, in Alcalde Hevia street, 7.
- The new Provincial Traffic Headquarters, inaugurated on 25 October 2021 in Eira da Veiga Square, 8.
- A post office (Correos) in Espincelo street.
- A military socio-cultural sports centre of the Ministry of Defence in Espincelo street with 3 covered padel courts, 1 covered tennis court, 3 swimming pools, a multi-sports field, a sports hall and a picnic area with 4 barbecues and 13 tables.

=== Sports and leisure ===
- The Campolongo sports centre, the largest in the city, has been completely renovated by the BeOne Sport and Fitness chain.
- The Campolongo military socio-cultural sports centre.

=== Other facilities ===
The district also has two underground car parks, the 415-space Parking Central, opened in 1998 and the 716-space Parking Campolongo, opened in 2009.

== Festivities and cultural events ==
The neighbourhood celebrates the festivities of its patron San José for several days around 19 March each year.

== Gallery ==
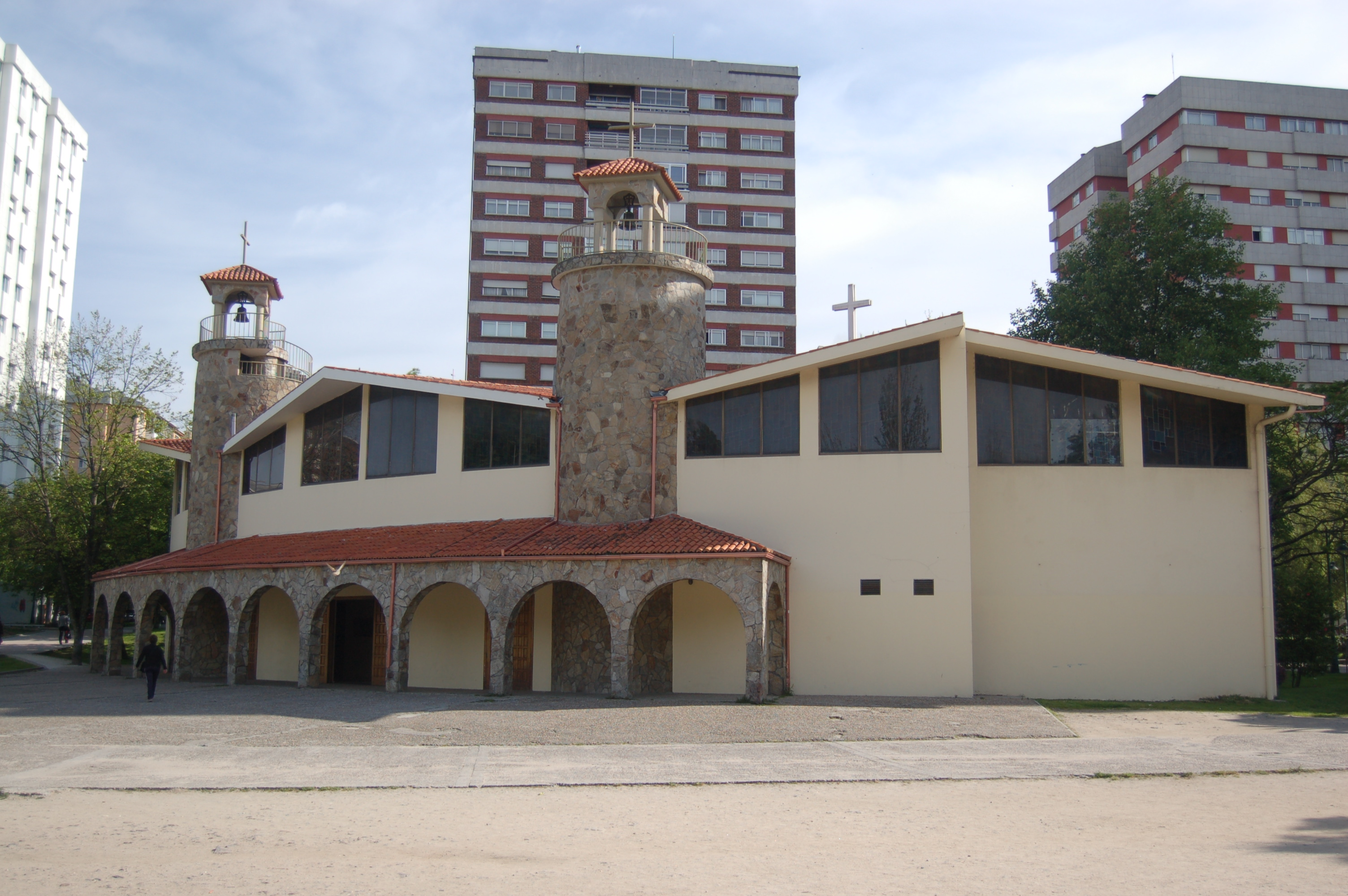
St. Joseph's Church

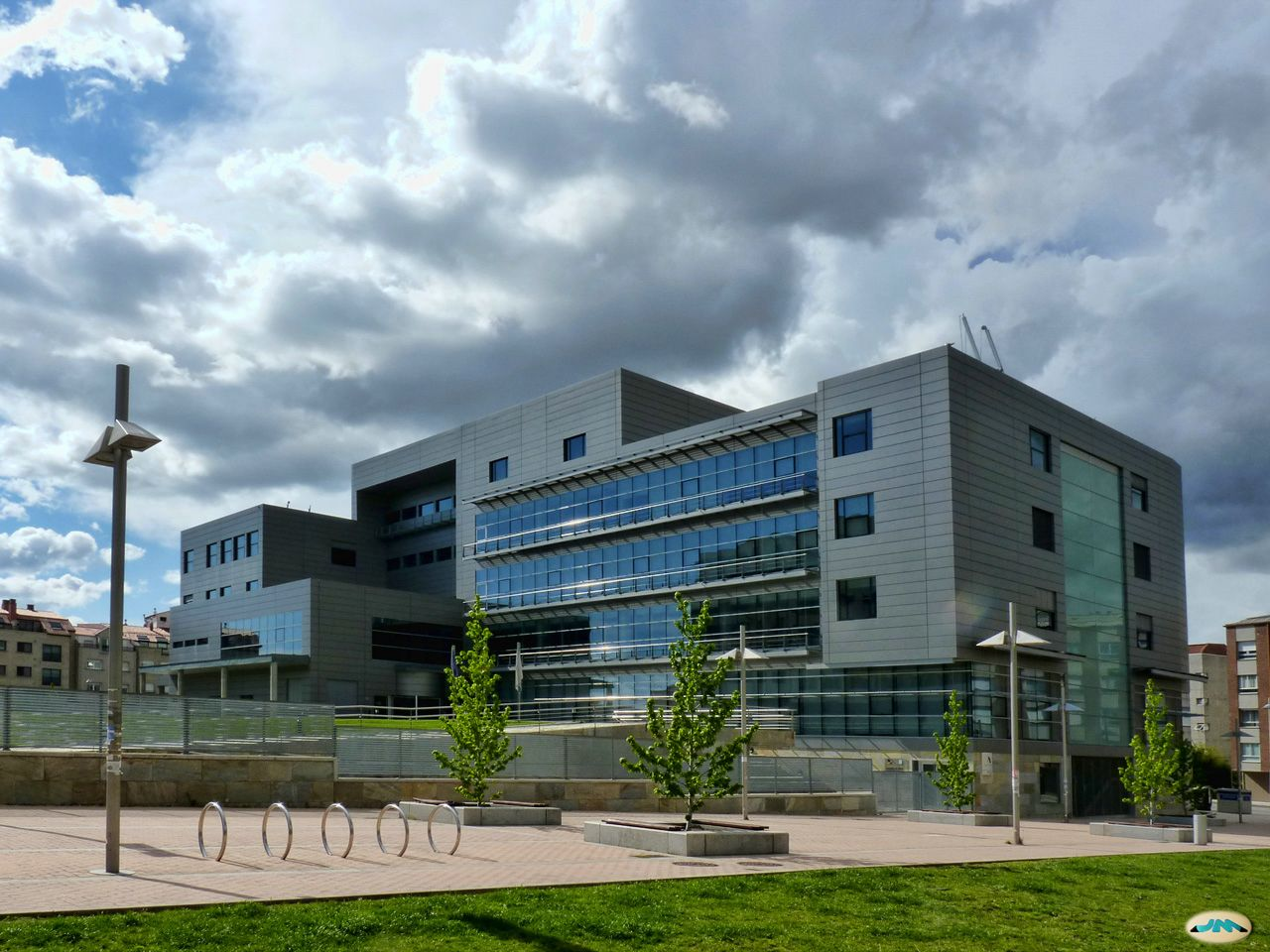
Provincial Tax and Fiscal Office

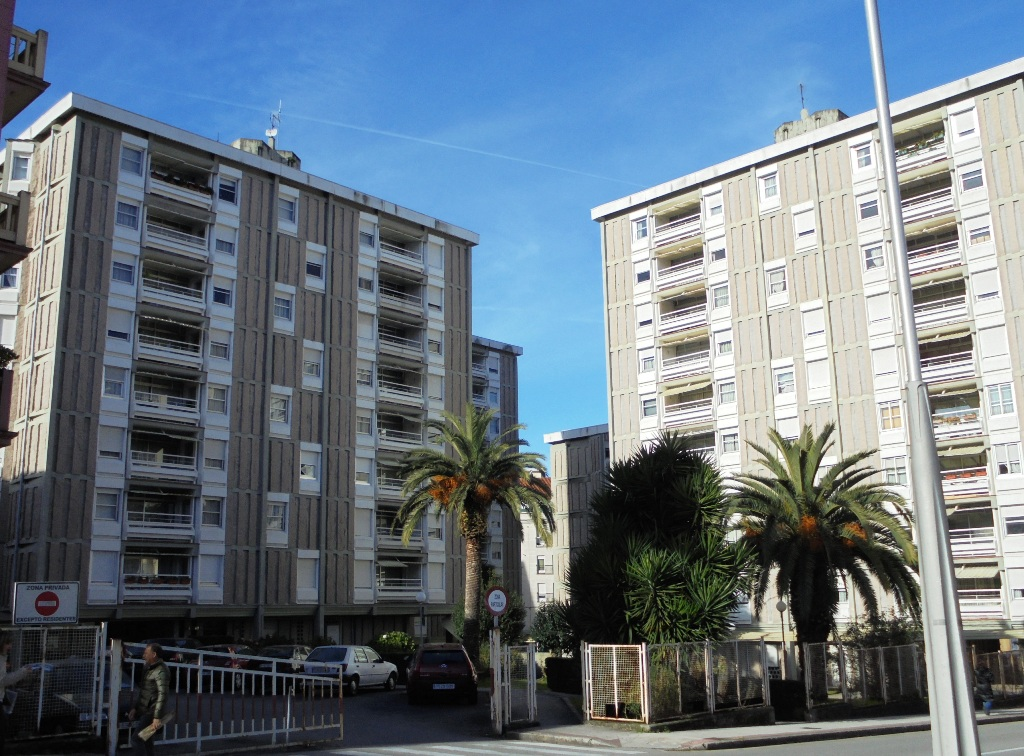
Rationalist buildings of the Ministry of Defence by the architect Xosé Bar Boo

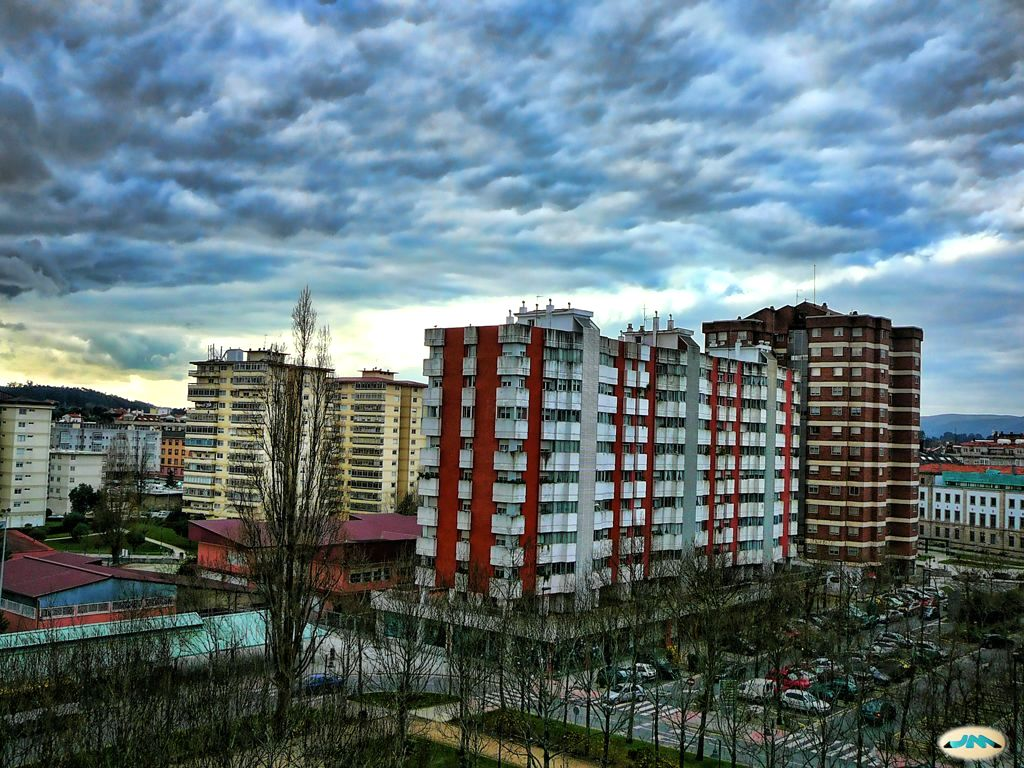
Augusto García Sánchez Avenue and Galicia Square

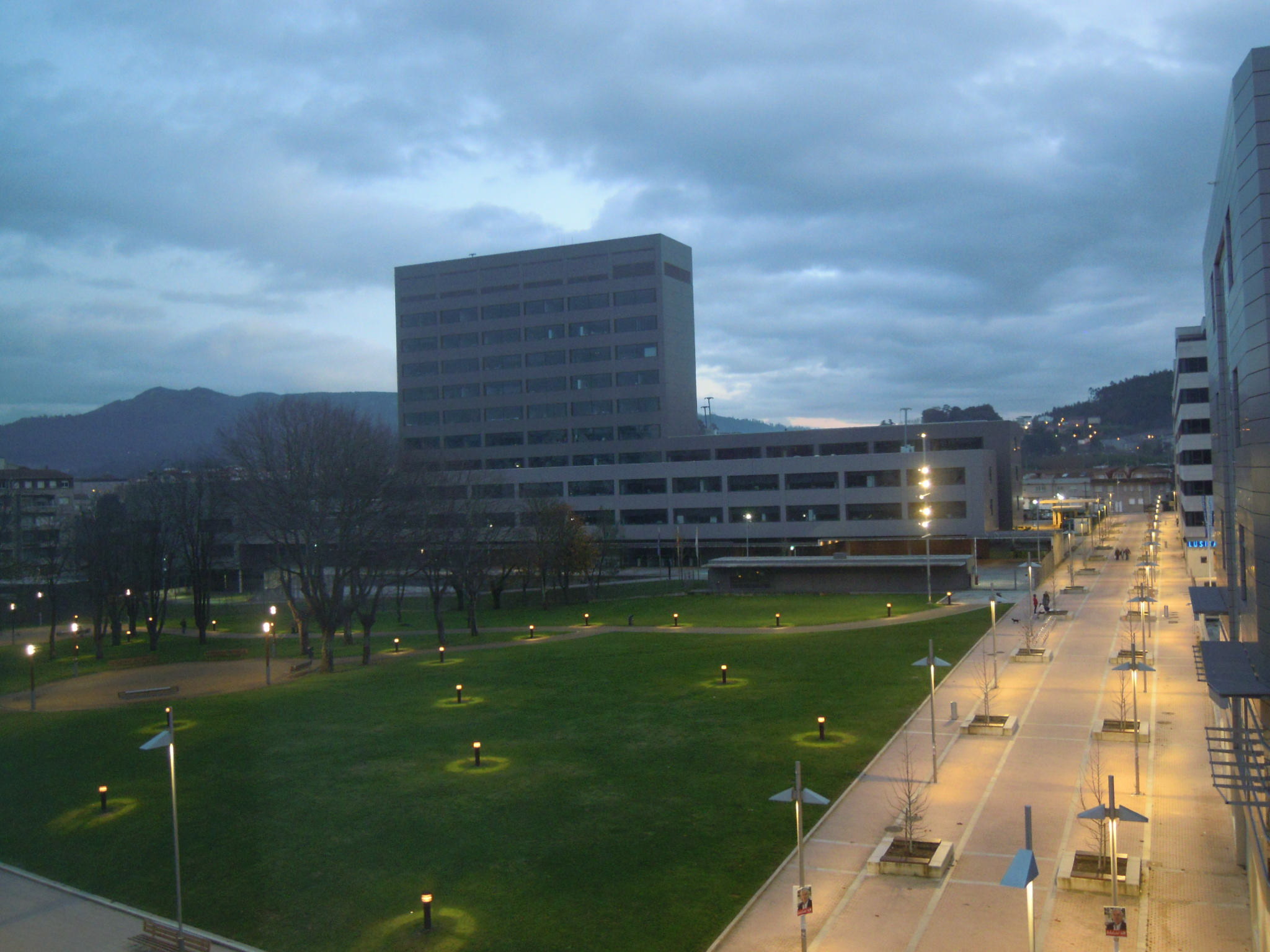
Administrative building of the Galician Government.

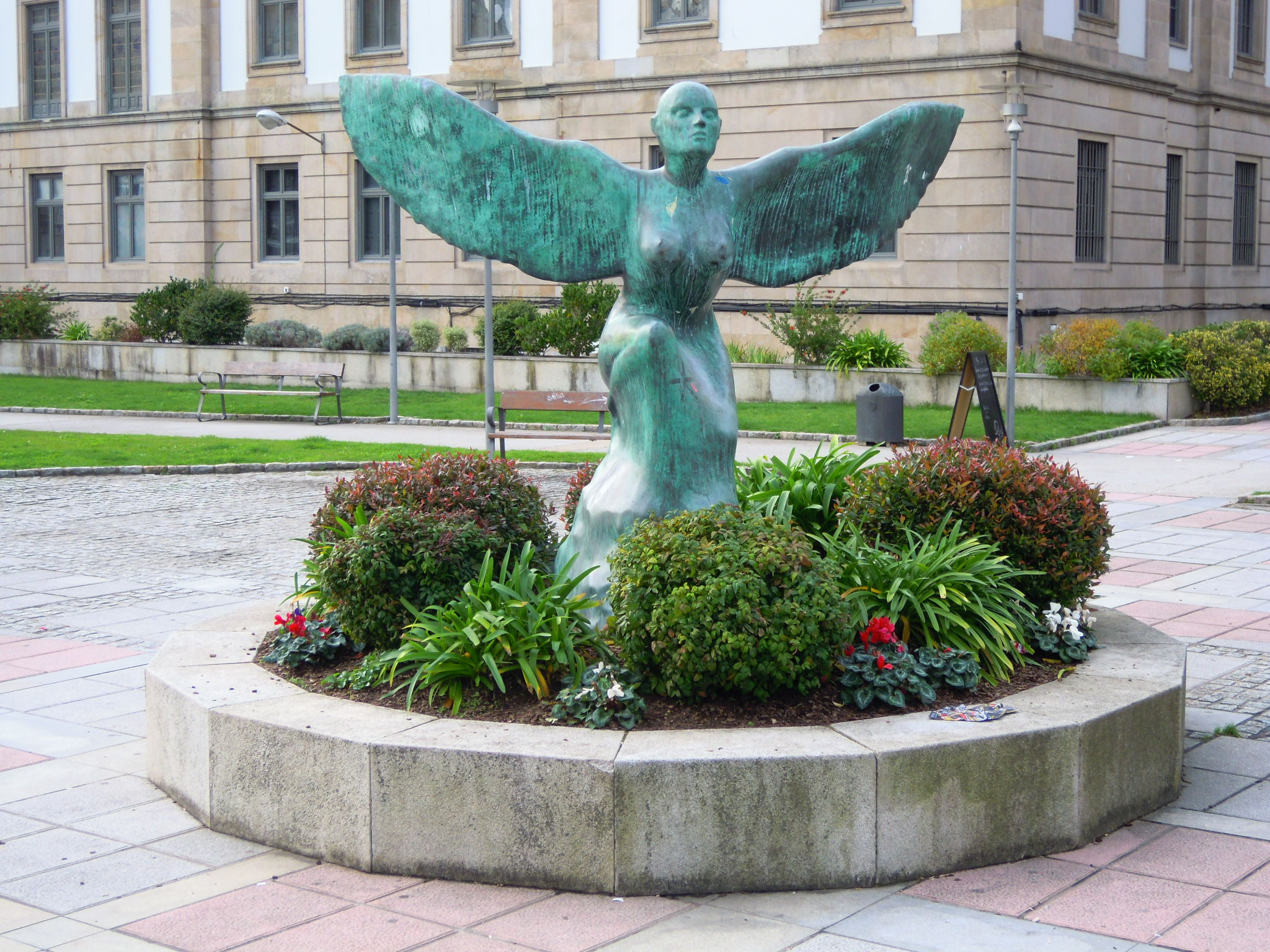
Sculpture to Freedom on the Freedom Square

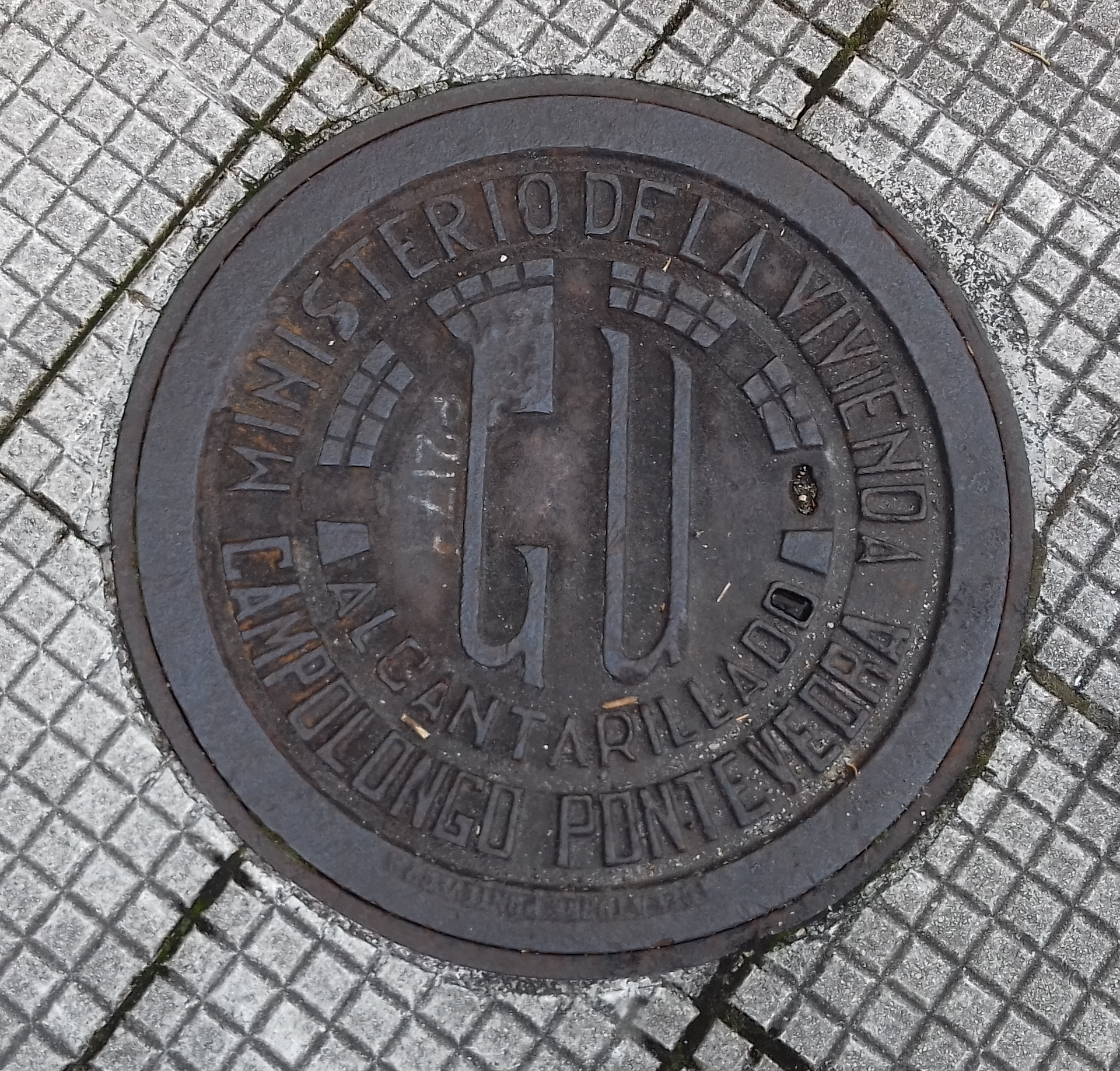
Campolongo manhole cover.

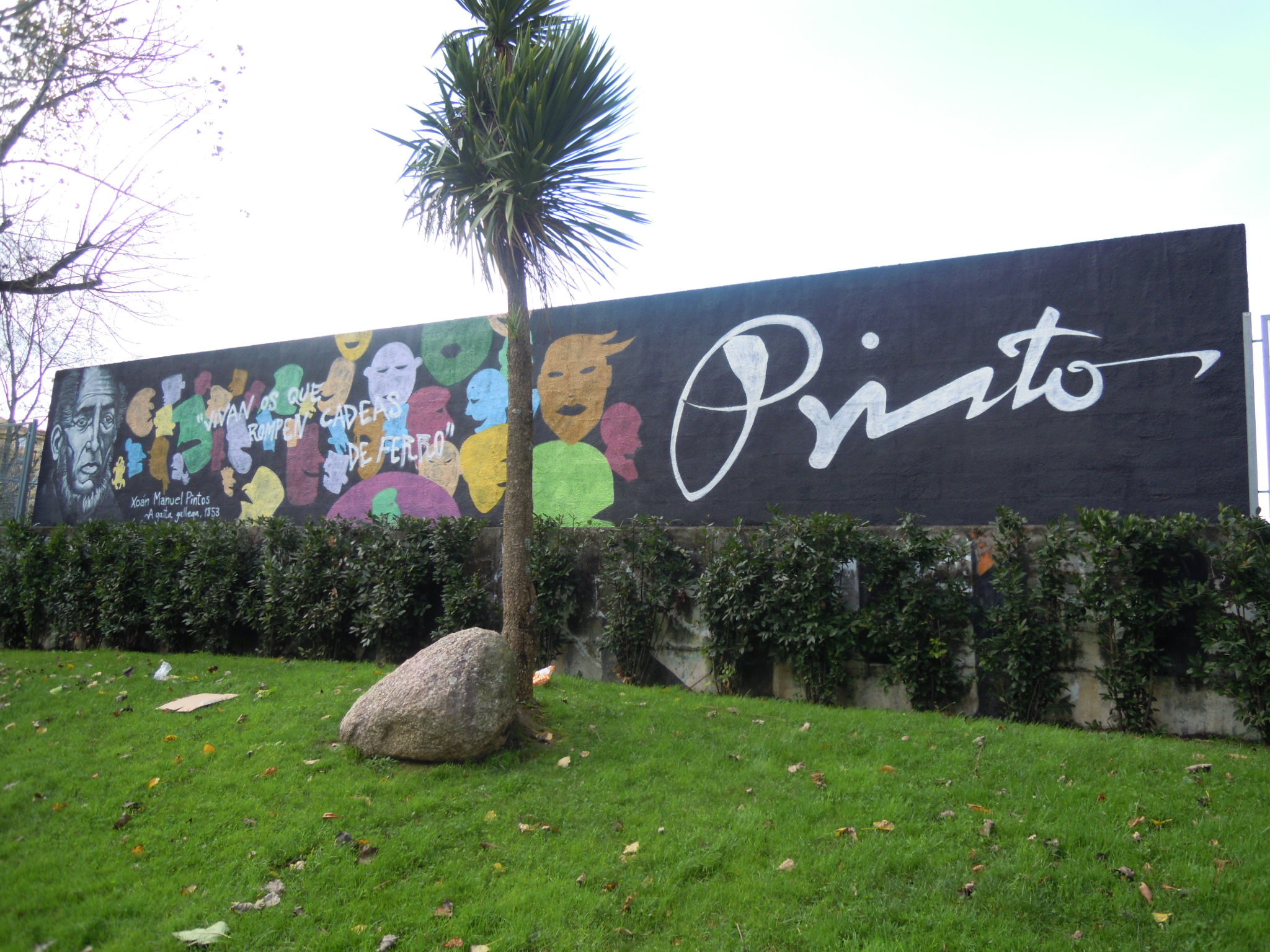
Graffiti in honour of Xoán Manuel Pintos.

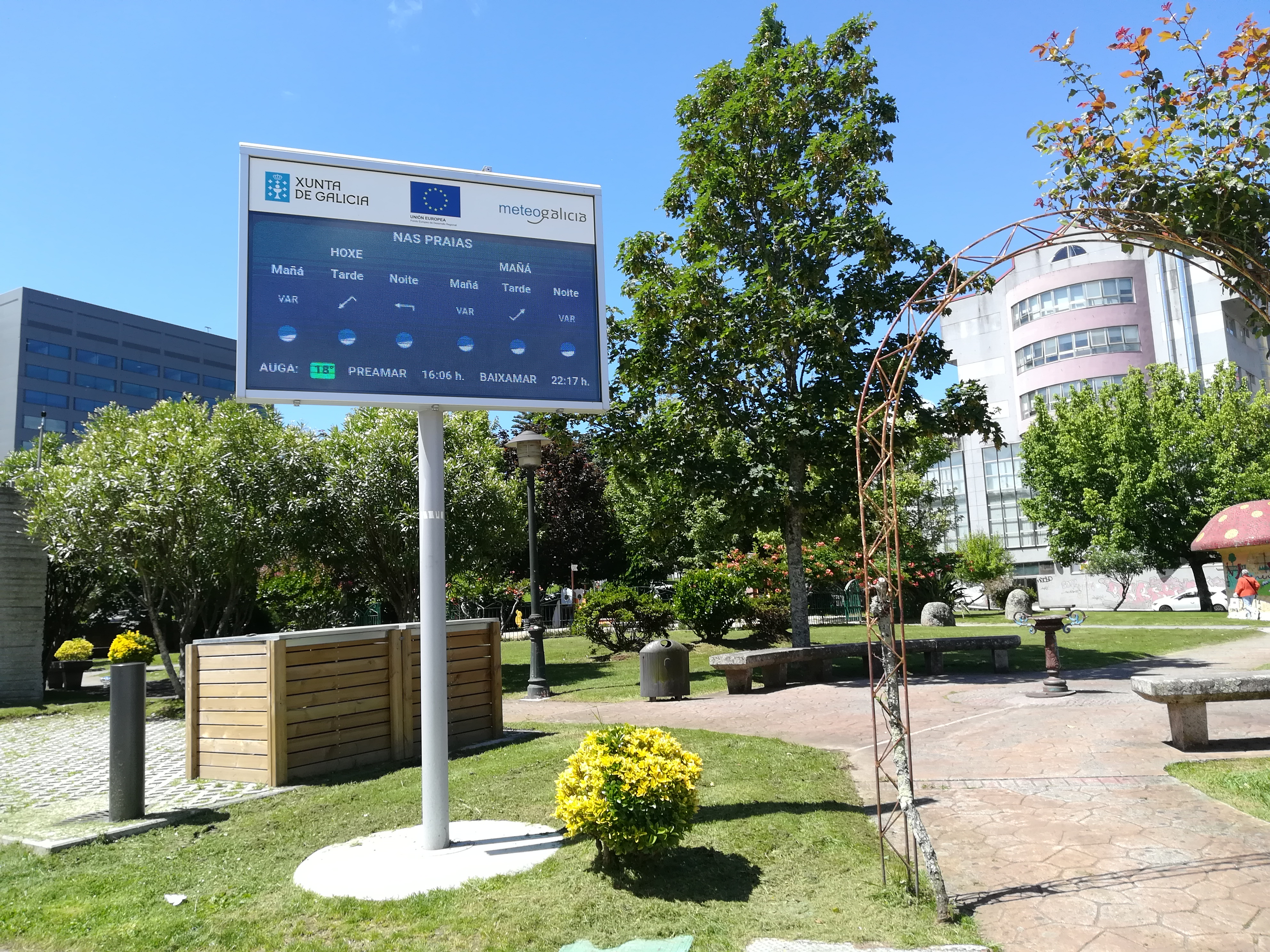
Weather station display

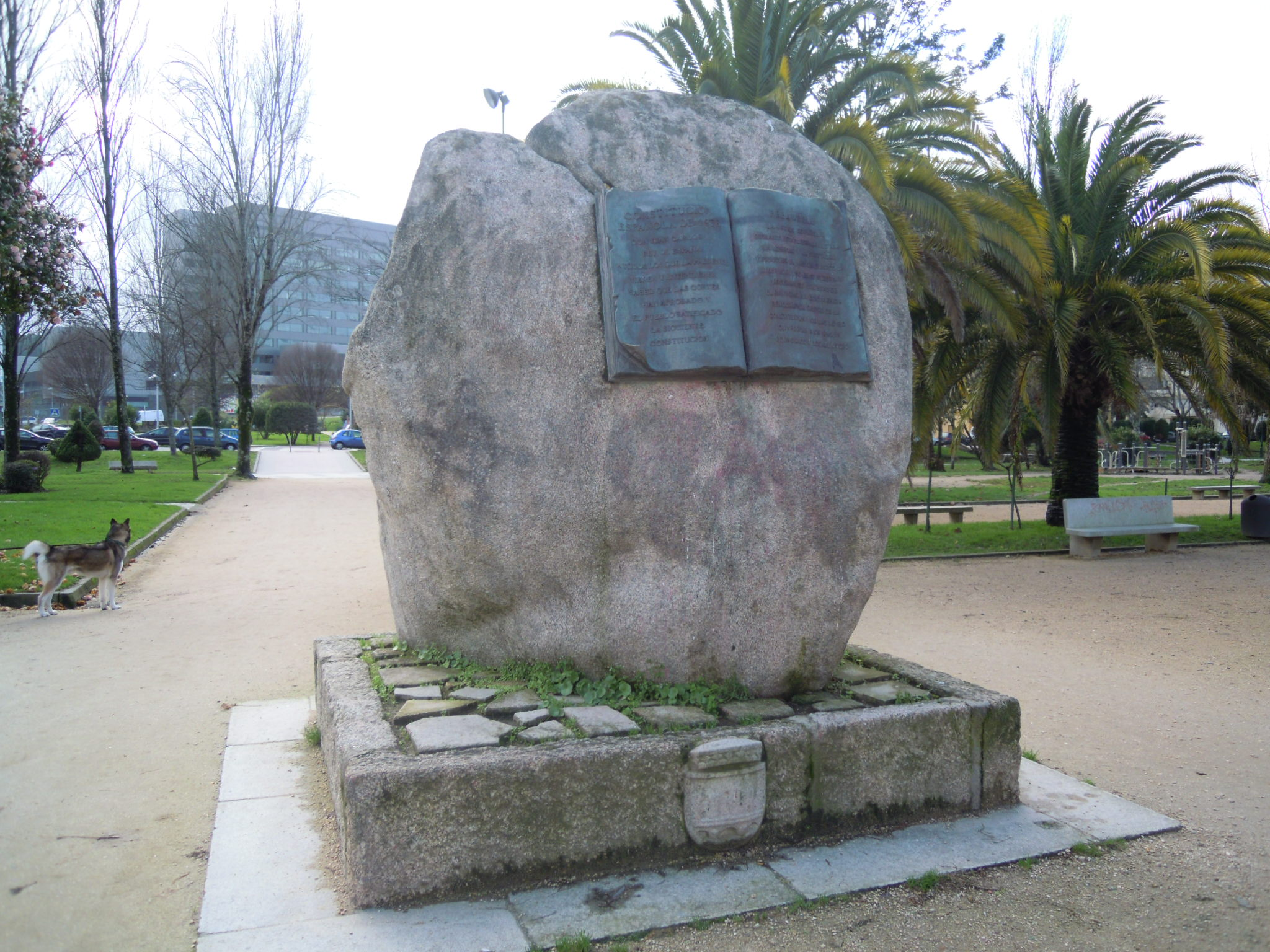
Sculpture in honour of the Spanish Constitution of 1978 in the Plaza de la Constitution.

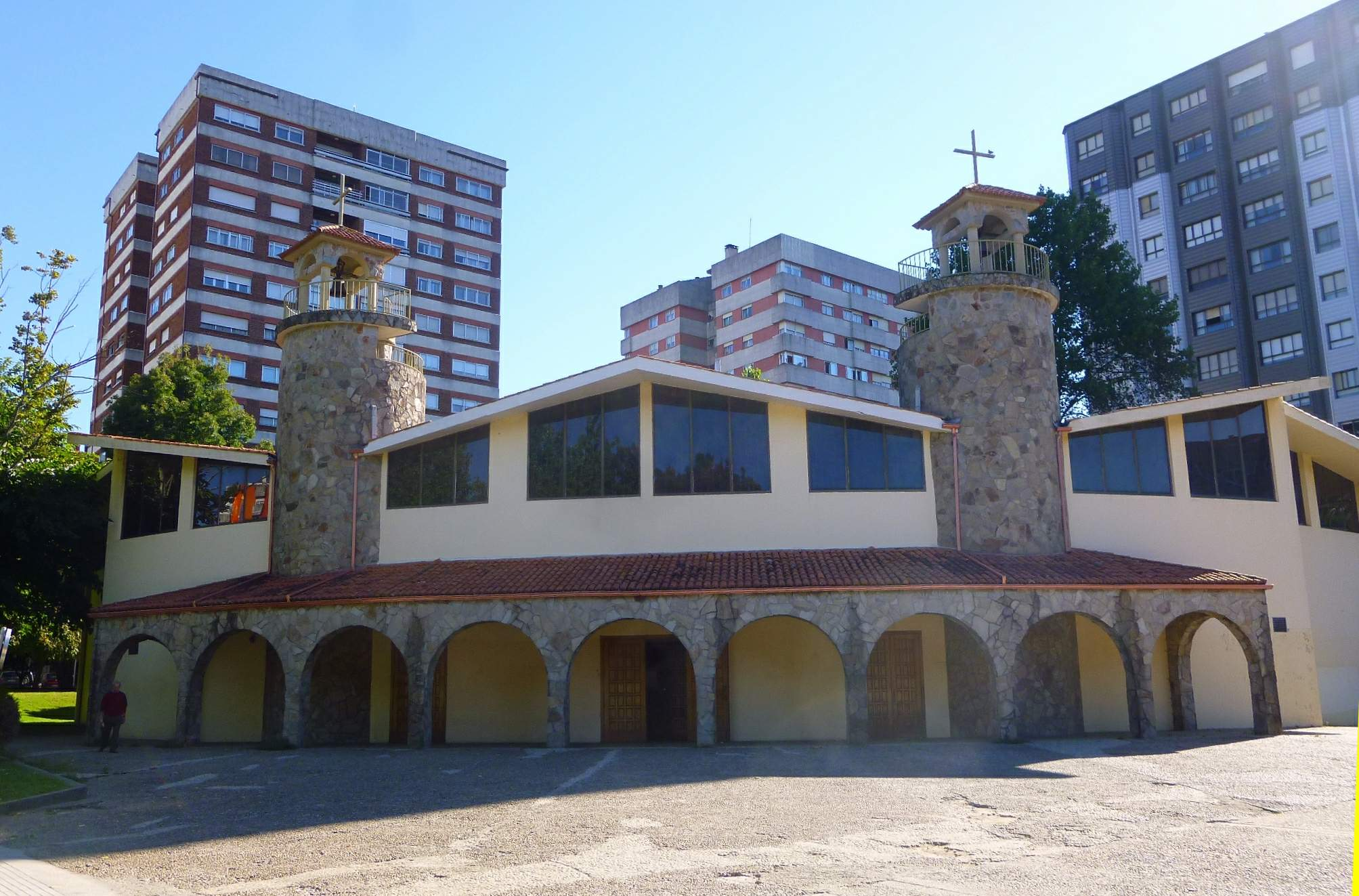
San José church

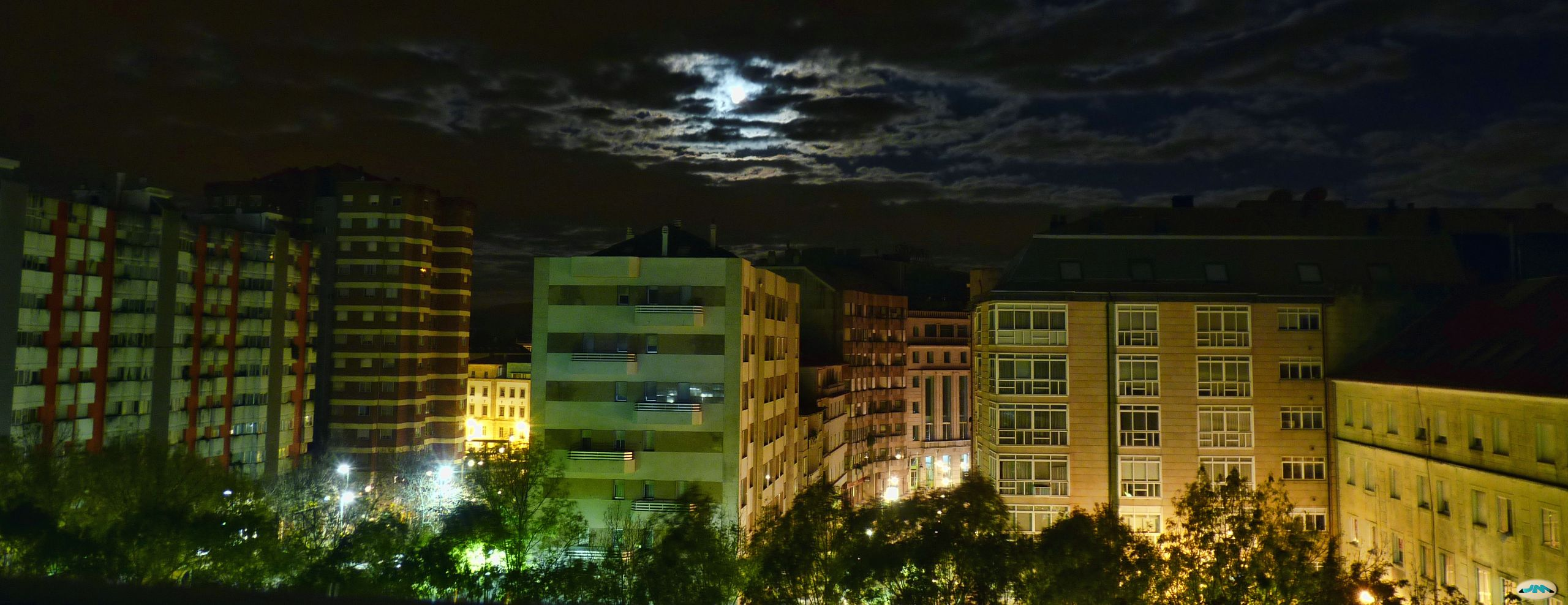
Galicia Square

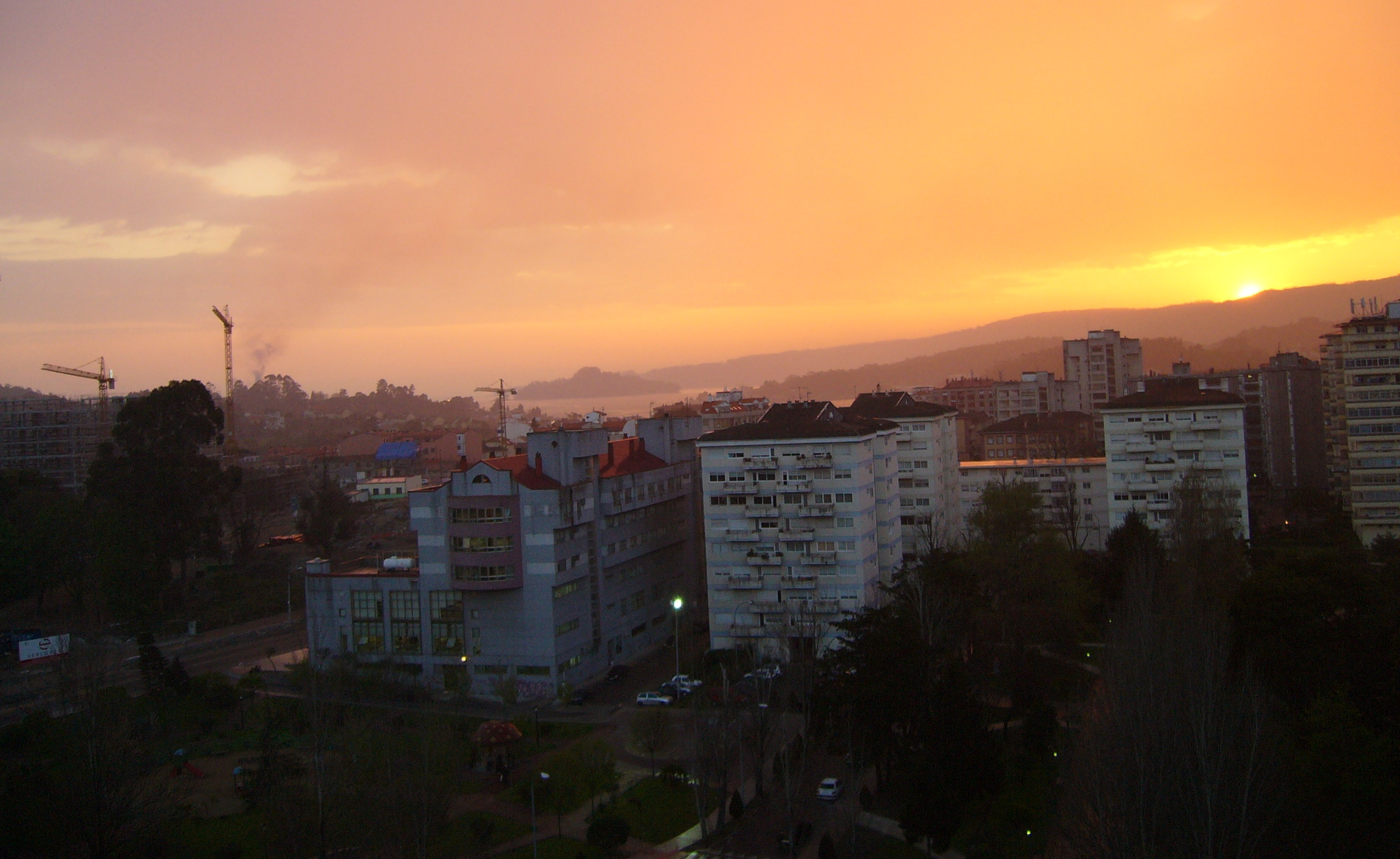
Campolongo Park, ria de Pontevedra and Tambo Island in the background

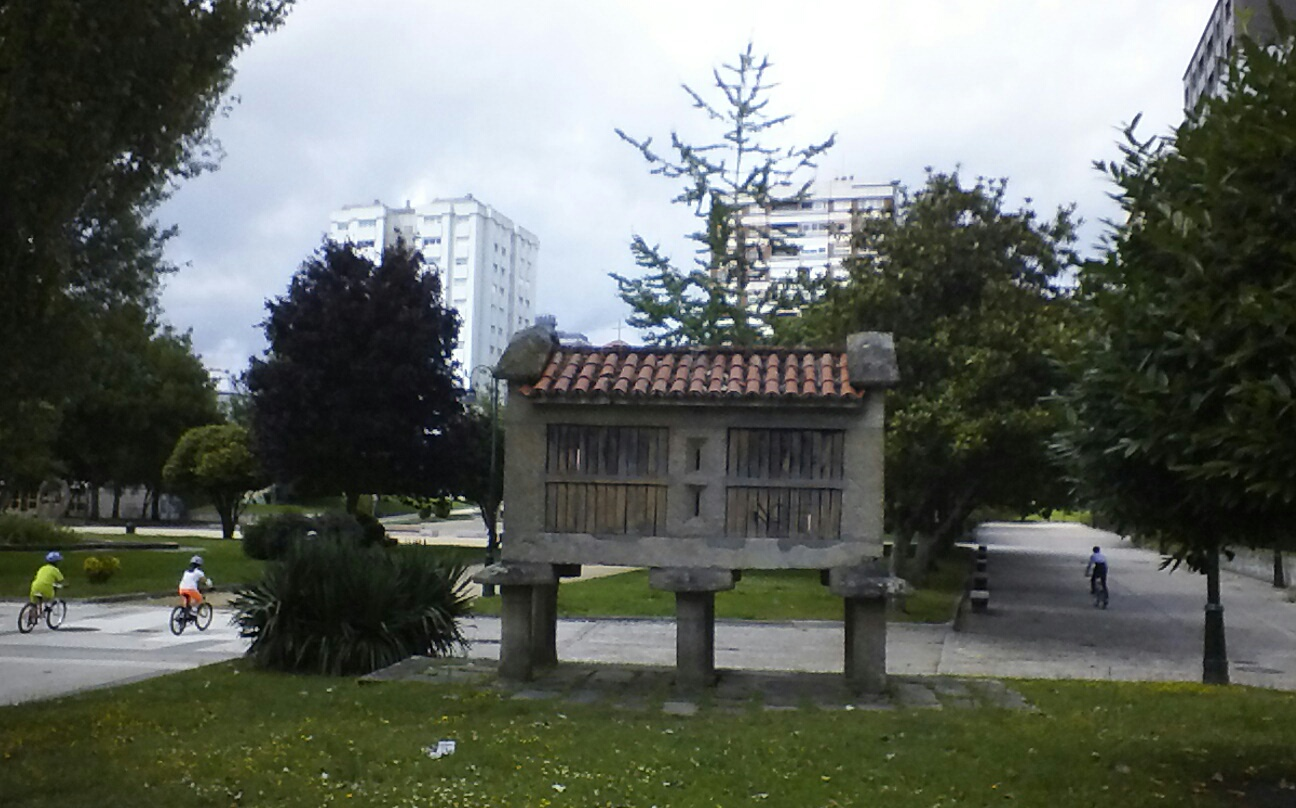
Galician granary on stilts

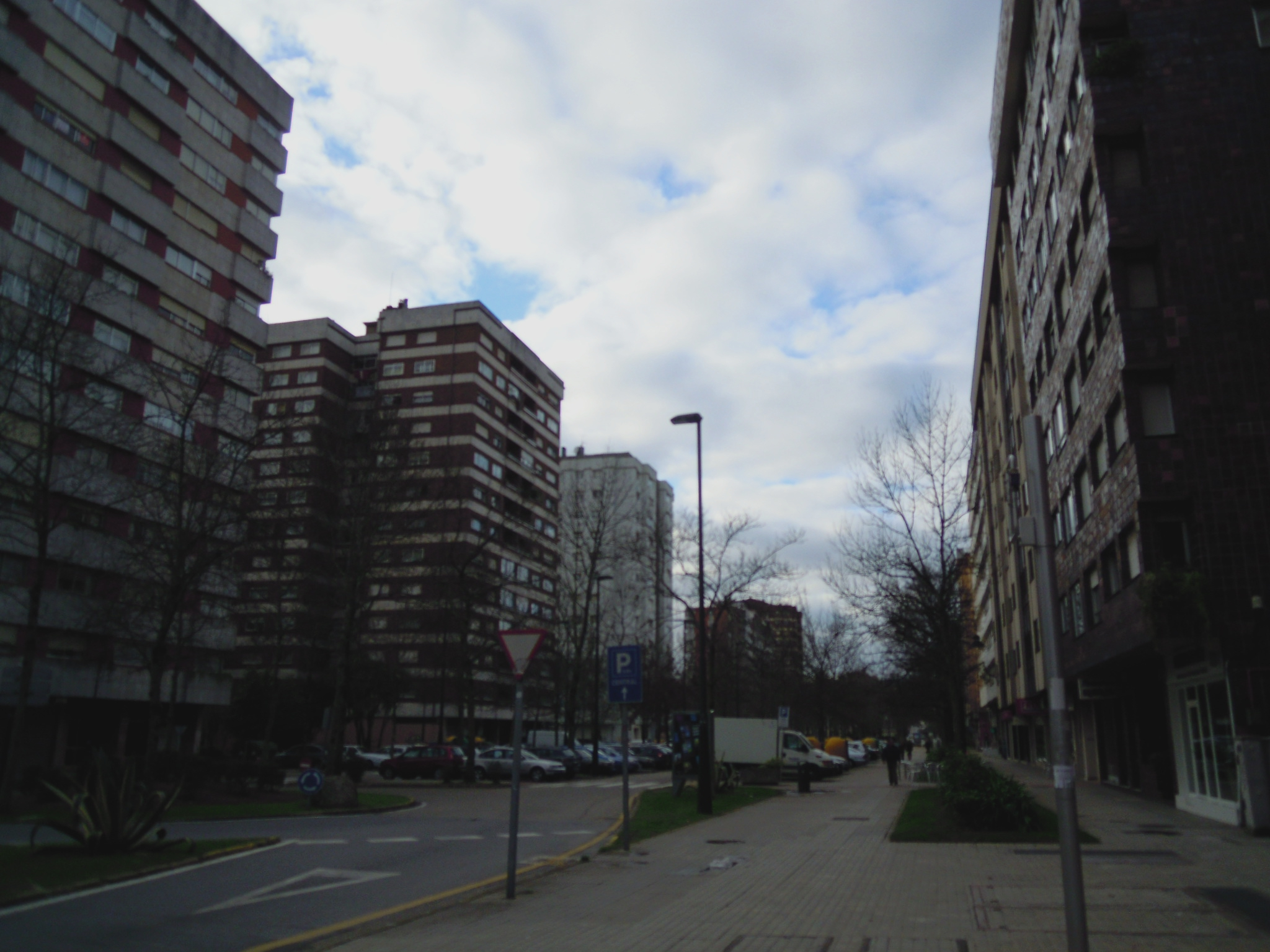
Augusto García Sánchez Avenue

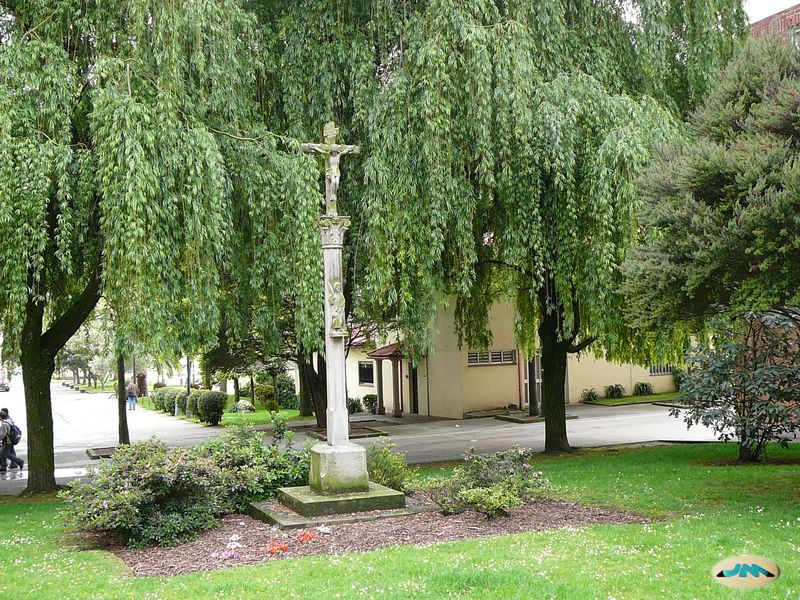
Garden

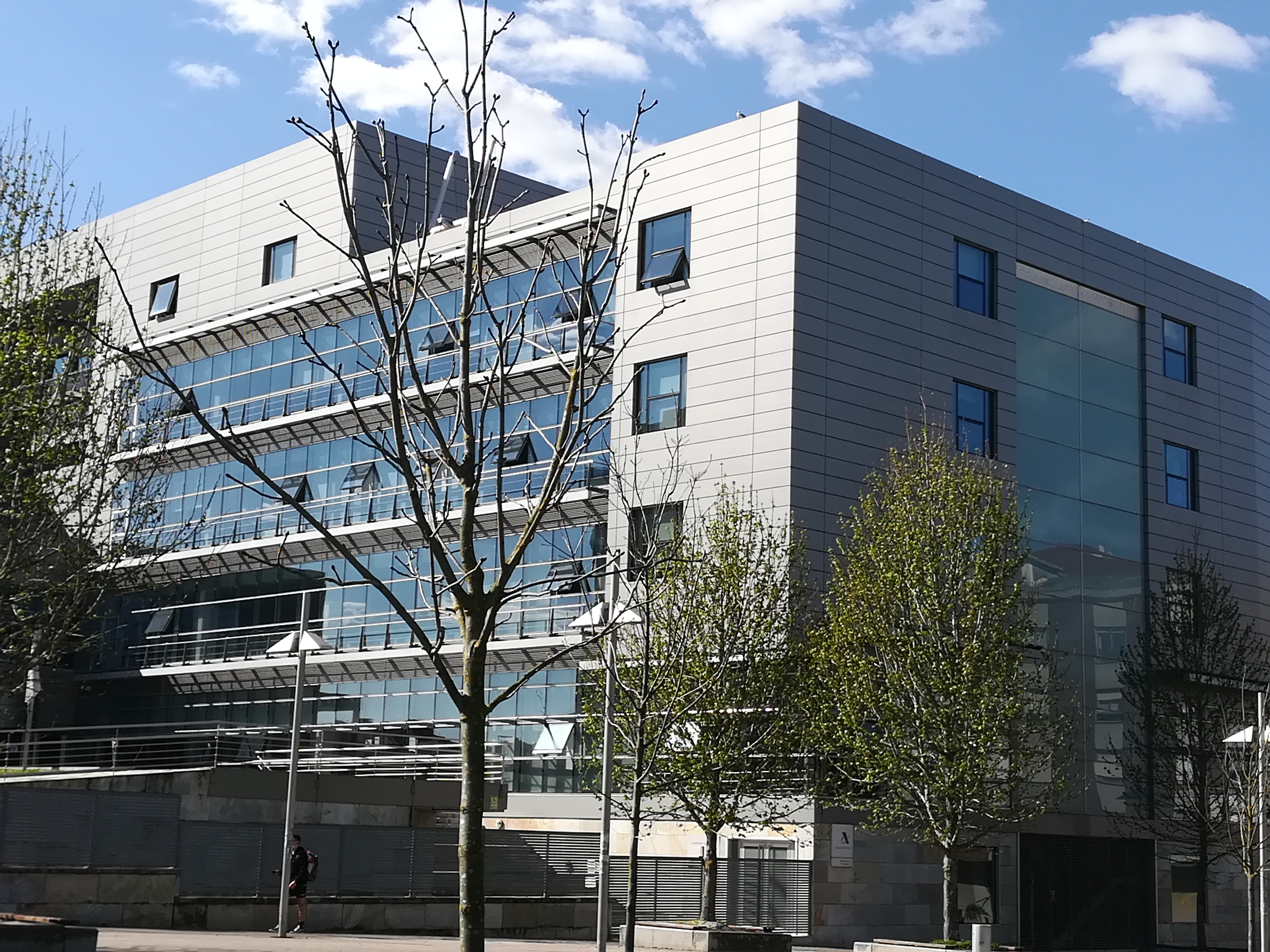
Provincial Tax office in Pontevedra

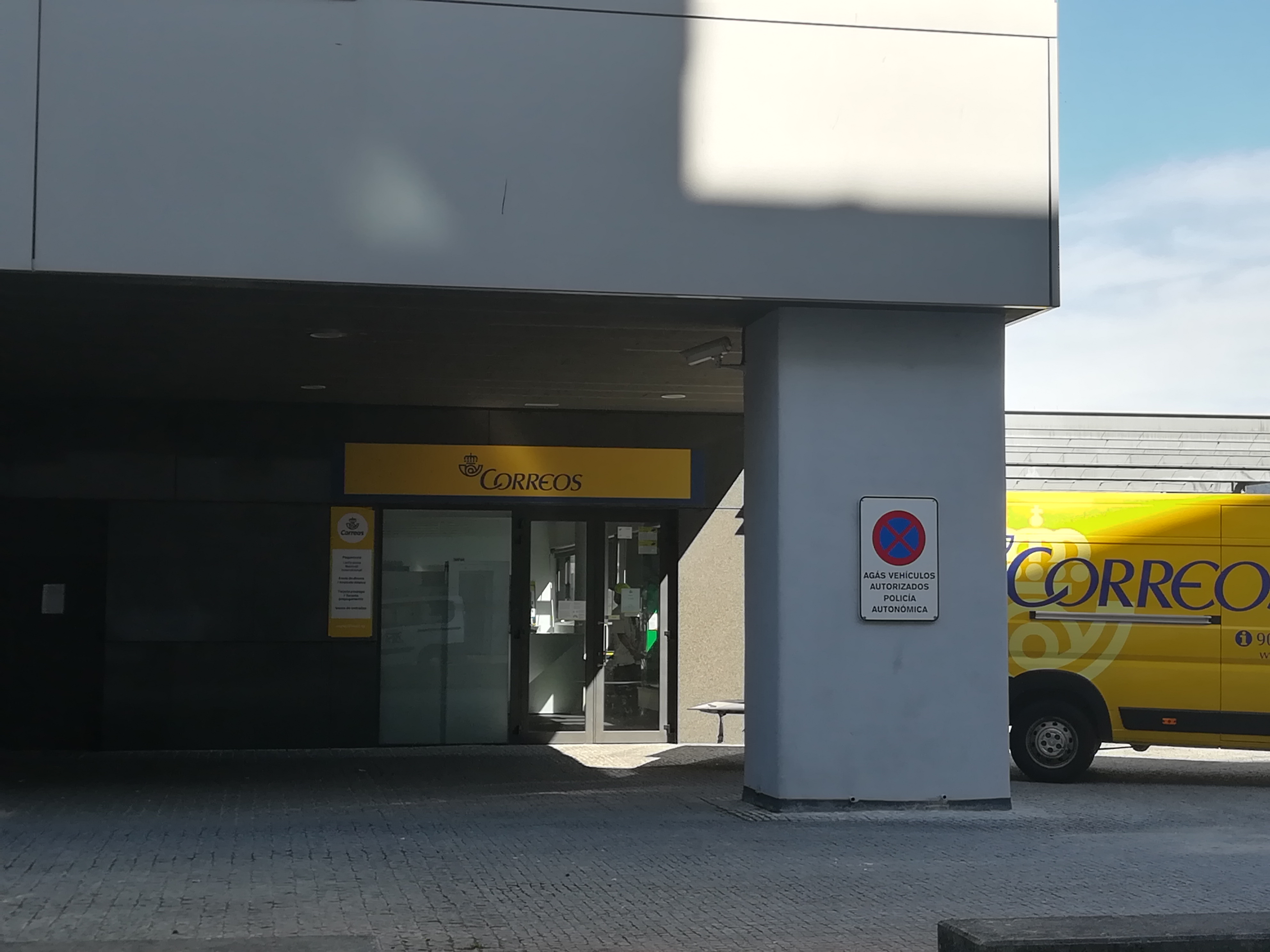
Correos post office in Espincelo Street

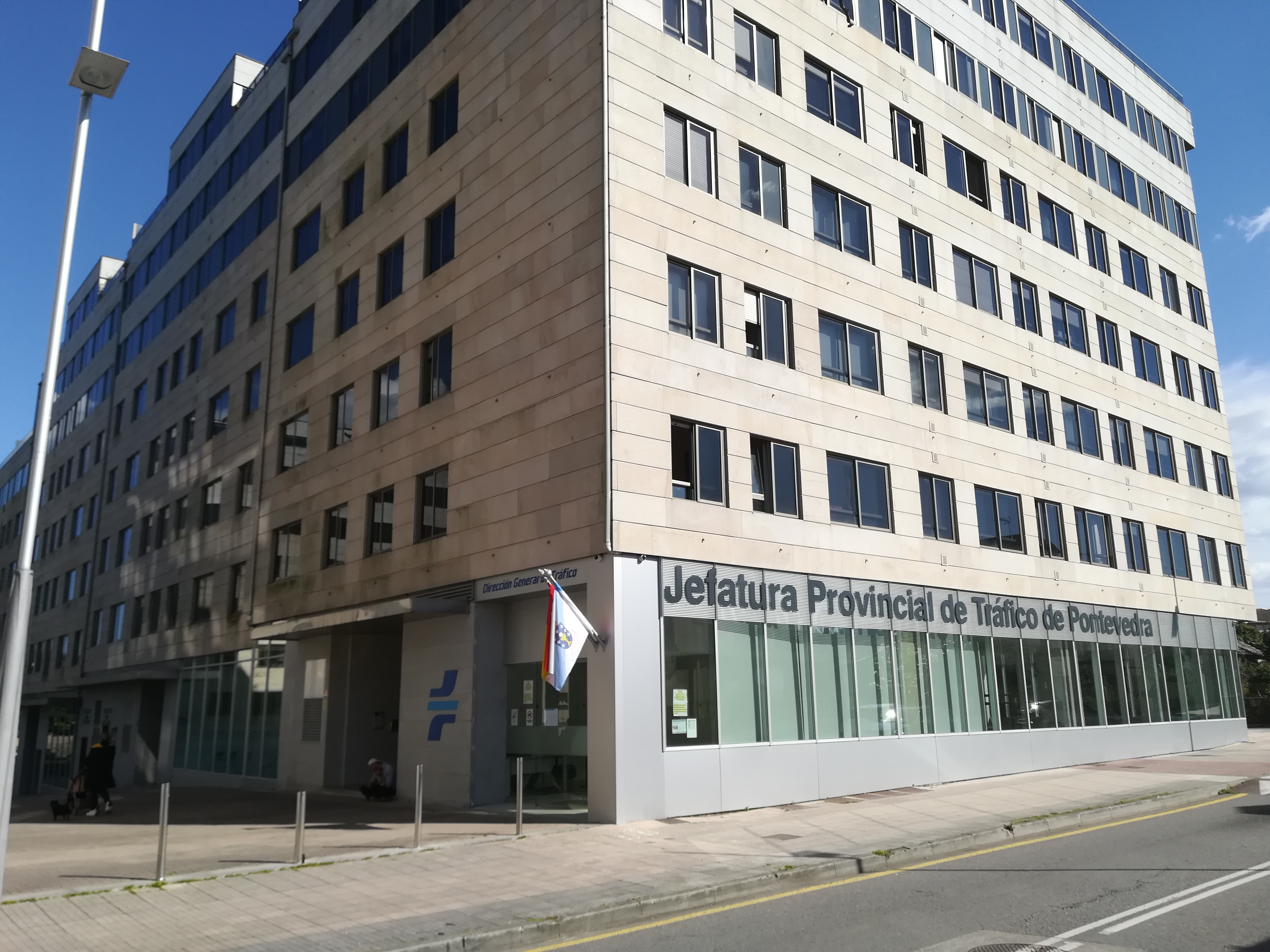
Provincial Traffic Headquarters in Pontevedra

== See also ==
=== Related articles ===
- Plaza de Galicia
- Xunta de Galicia building
- ONCE
- Mollavao
