= Edificio administrativo de la Xunta de Galicia (Pontevedra) =

Administrative complex in Pontevedra, Spain

Administrative Complex of Pontevedra
- Edificio Administrativo de la Xunta de Galicia en Pontevedra
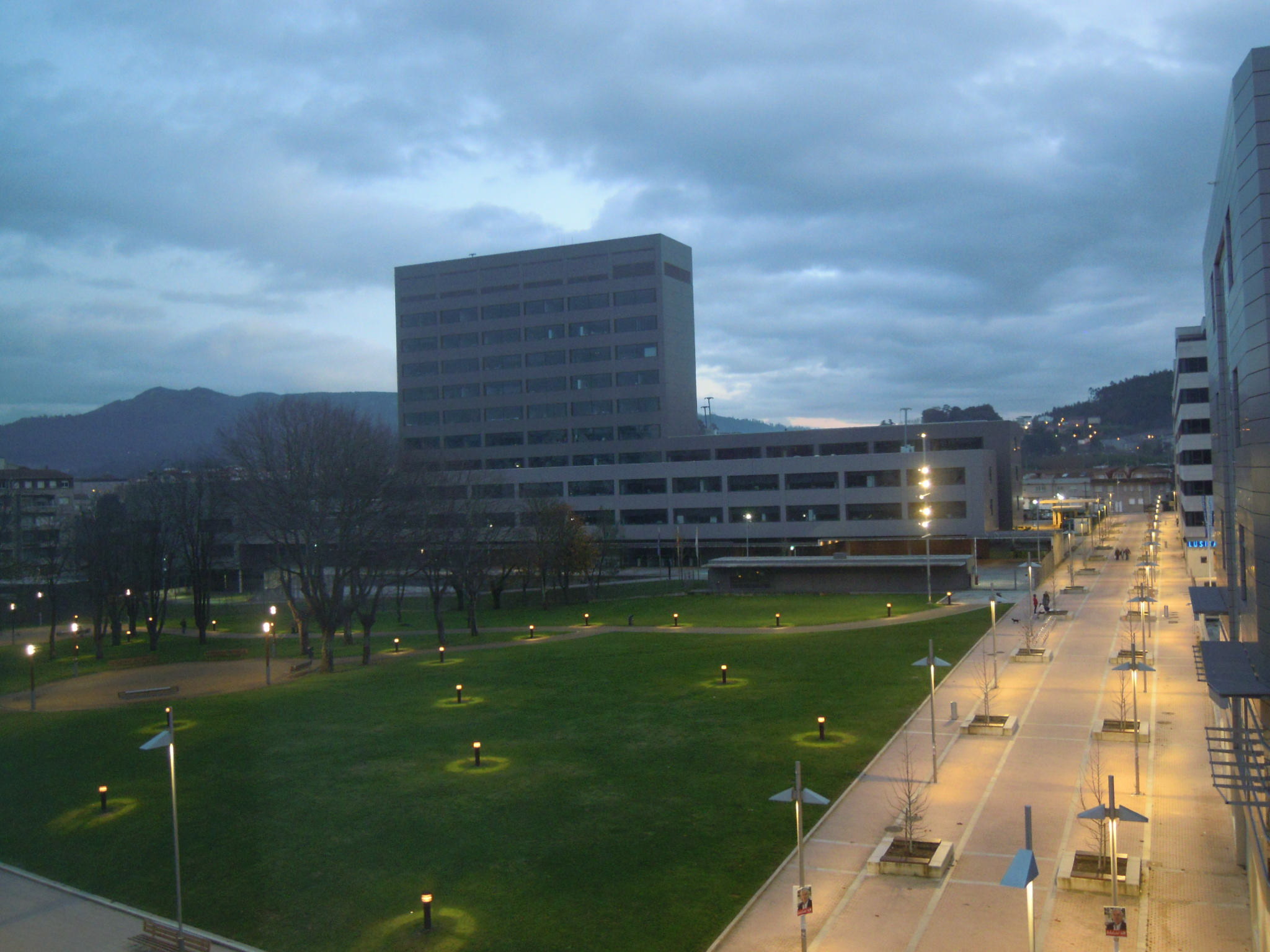
- North façade of the administrative complex
- Interactive map of the Administrative Complex of Pontevedra area

General information
- Type: Government building
- Location: Pontevedra, Galicia, Spain
- Coordinates: 42°25′29.5″N 8°38′42.1″W
- Construction started: April 2005
- Completed: December 2008
- Opening: 16 December 2008
- Owner: Xunta de Galicia

Technical details
- Floor count: 10
- Floor area: 42404 m2

Design and construction
- Architects: Manuel Gallego Jorreto and Jacobo Rodríguez-Losada Allende
- Main contractor: Grupo San José

Website
- https://www.xunta.gal/

The Administrative building of the Xunta de Galicia in Pontevedra (or Edificio Central de la Xunta de Galicia in Pontevedra) is an office complex designed to house the various public services of the Galician Government in Pontevedra, Spain. The building houses many of the Galician administration's departments and was designed by the architects Manuel Gallego Jorreto and Jacobo Rodríguez-Losada Allende.

== Location ==
The Administrative Complex of Pontevedra is located at 43 Avenida María Victoria Moreno in the Campolongo district.

== History ==
The building, designed to bring together the administrative services of the Galician Government in the province of Pontevedra, which until then had been scattered throughout the city, was envisaged as early as the 1990s, but it was not until the early 2000s that the idea was finally implemented.,

On 12 June 2002 Pontevedra City Council and the Spanish Ministry of Defence signed an agreement to transform the site of the former Campolongo barracks (dating back to 1924 for expropriations and 1933 for the construction work) into an administrative and residential complex.

The selection process for the architectural project started in August 2003. The design of the administrative building in Campolongo was chosen from six projects on 27 December 2004. The Galician Government chose the project by architects Manuel Gallego Jorreto and Jacobo Rodríguez-Losada Allende and the construction company San José to build its new headquarters in Pontevedra.

Work on the administrative complex began in April 2005 and the demolition of the former artillery barracks was completed in July 2005.

Construction was completed in 2008 and the Galician Government announced the relocation of the administrative services. The Provincial Department of the Presidency was the first to move in on 15 December 2008 and the administrative complex was inaugurated on 16 December 2008.,

== Description ==
This complex is representative of the modern architecture in vogue in the 2000s. The Pontevedra administrative complex occupies 12,501 square metres on the site of the former Campolongo barracks and houses 1,000 civil servants.,

The administrative complex consists of several interconnected buildings. The main building is based on three floors occupying the entire length of the building space, in the centre of which are two twin towers of ten floors. The entire façade is made up of large longitudinal windows which provide a lot of light. The building has several interior gardens and a paved square at the front. The interior courtyards and skylights provide access to natural light. The building has a total of two basements, a semi-basement and ten floors.

The building houses 42,404 square metres of office space and space for laboratories, archives, storage, a conference room, a library, training rooms, workshops and a cafeteria.,

The interior of the building is designed as a container for large open work spaces that can be subdivided. The interior has no intermediate pillars but peripheral beams. The administrative complex houses all the provincial departments except for the Department of Public Works, Housing and Lands (located in Alcalde Hevia Street in a building dating from 1993) and some services of the Health Department (located in Vigo Avenue in a building dating from 1920). The building also houses the headquarters of the Galician Regional Police, a crèche and a post office, the latter since April 2014. The Xunta de Galicia also has another building in Pontevedra in Benito Corbal Street, 47.

The building is separated from María Victoria Moreno Avenue by a large green area, the María Vinyals Park, measuring 9125 square metres. The park absorbs some of the shadow cast by the building, while reducing its visual impact.

The administrative complex also has an underground car park with a capacity of 716 vehicles in the neighbouring residential complex. It was inaugurated on 15 March 2009.

== Gallery ==
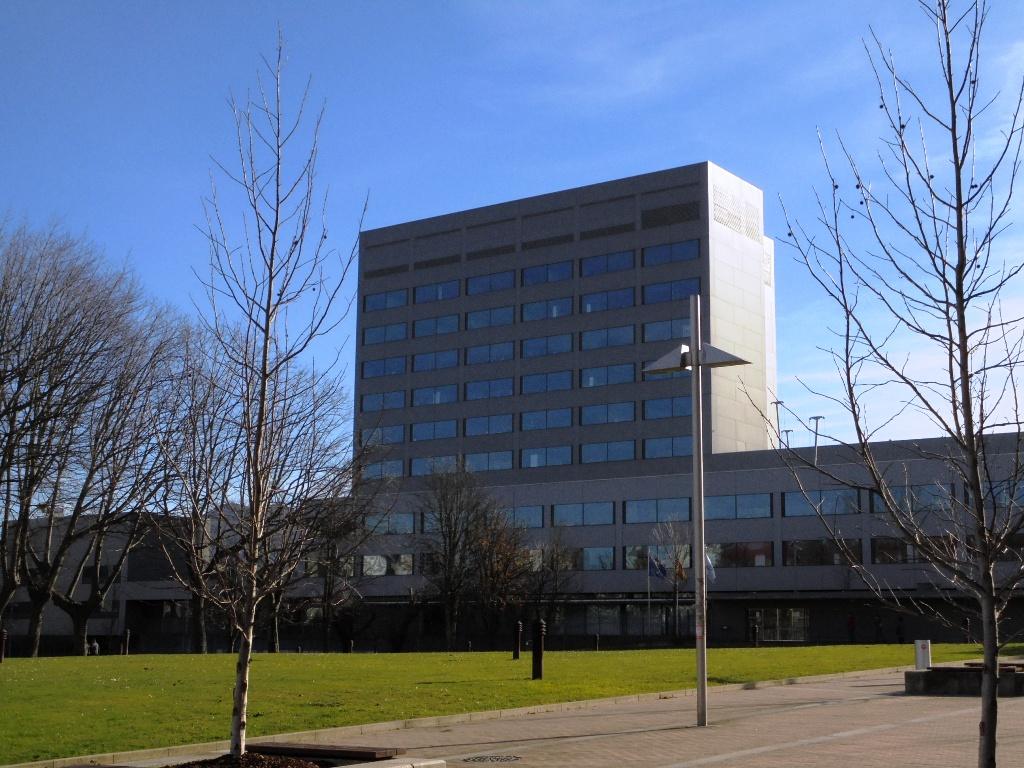

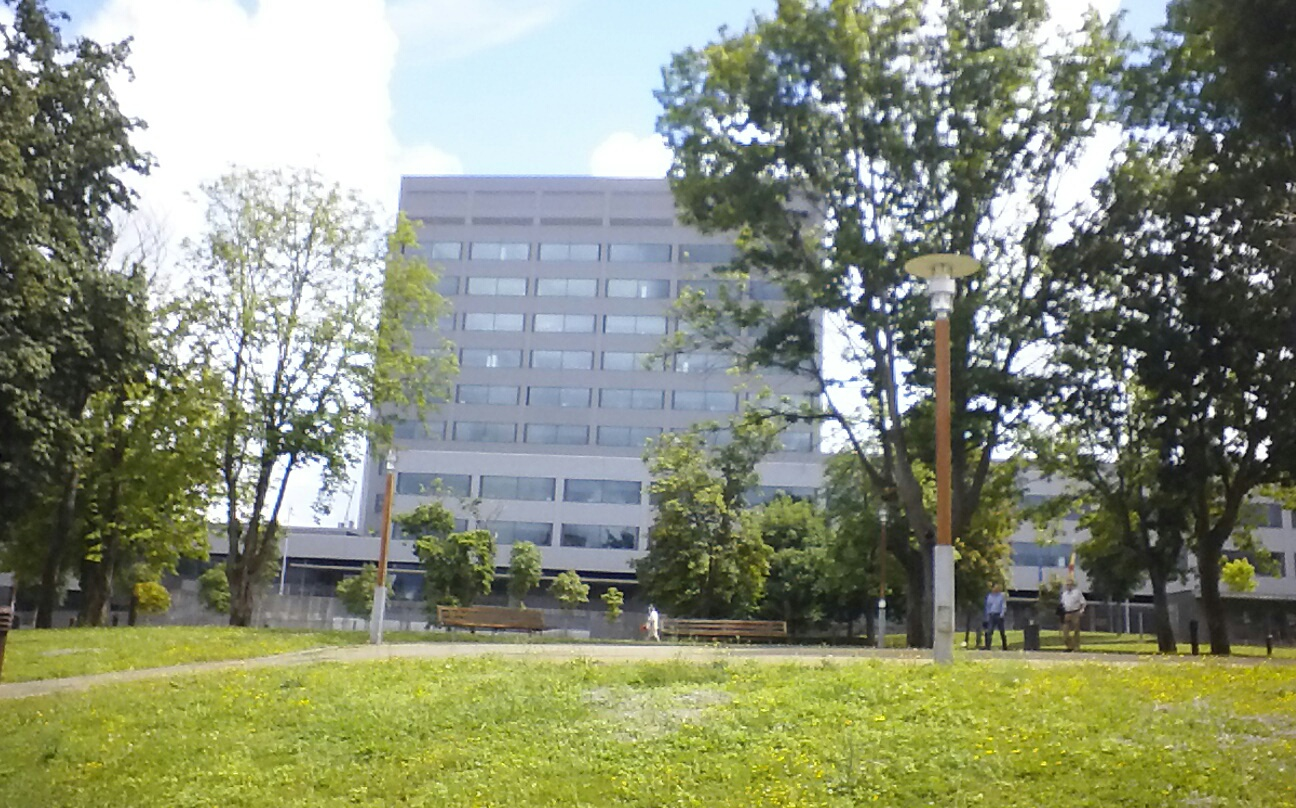

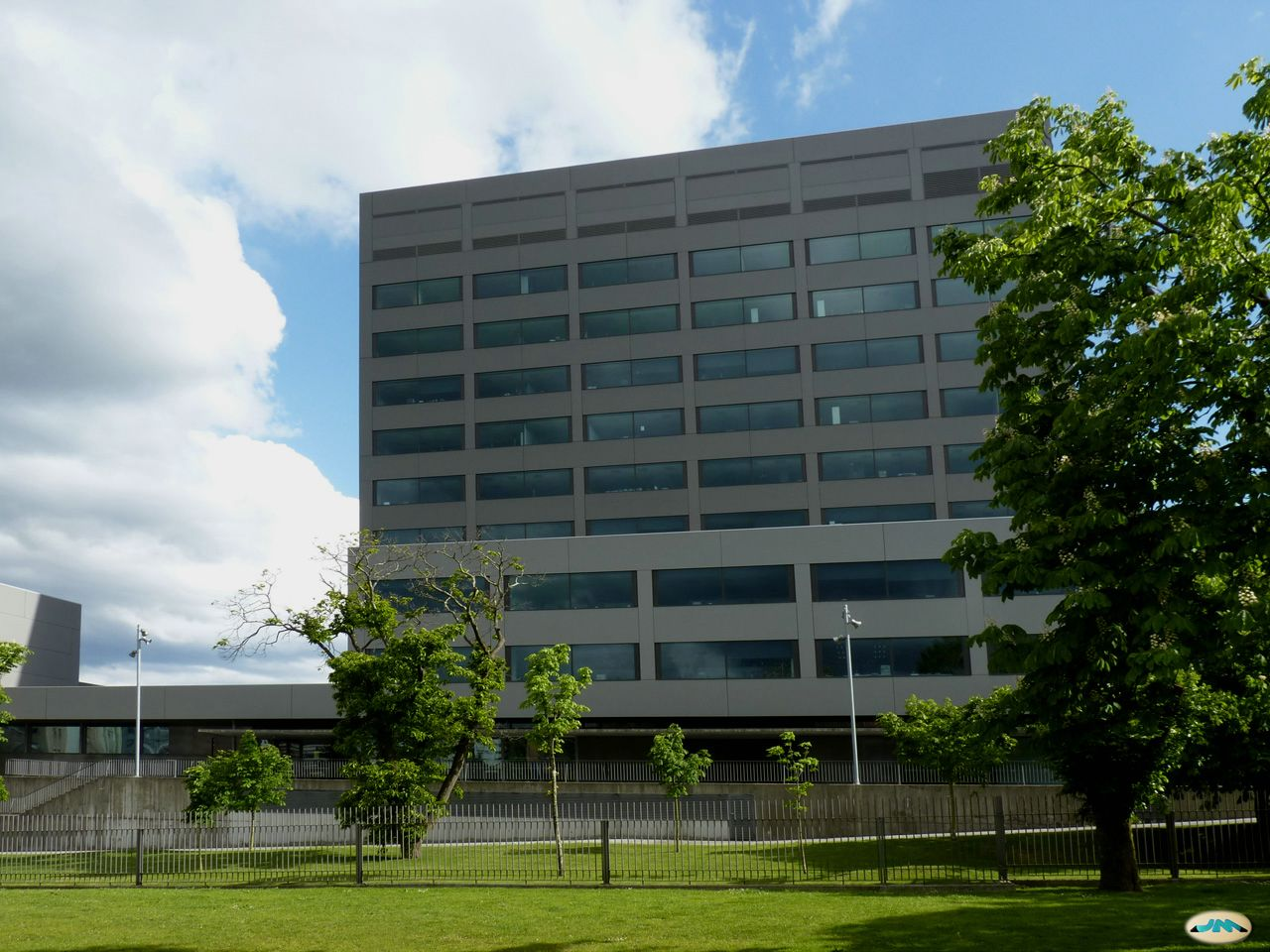

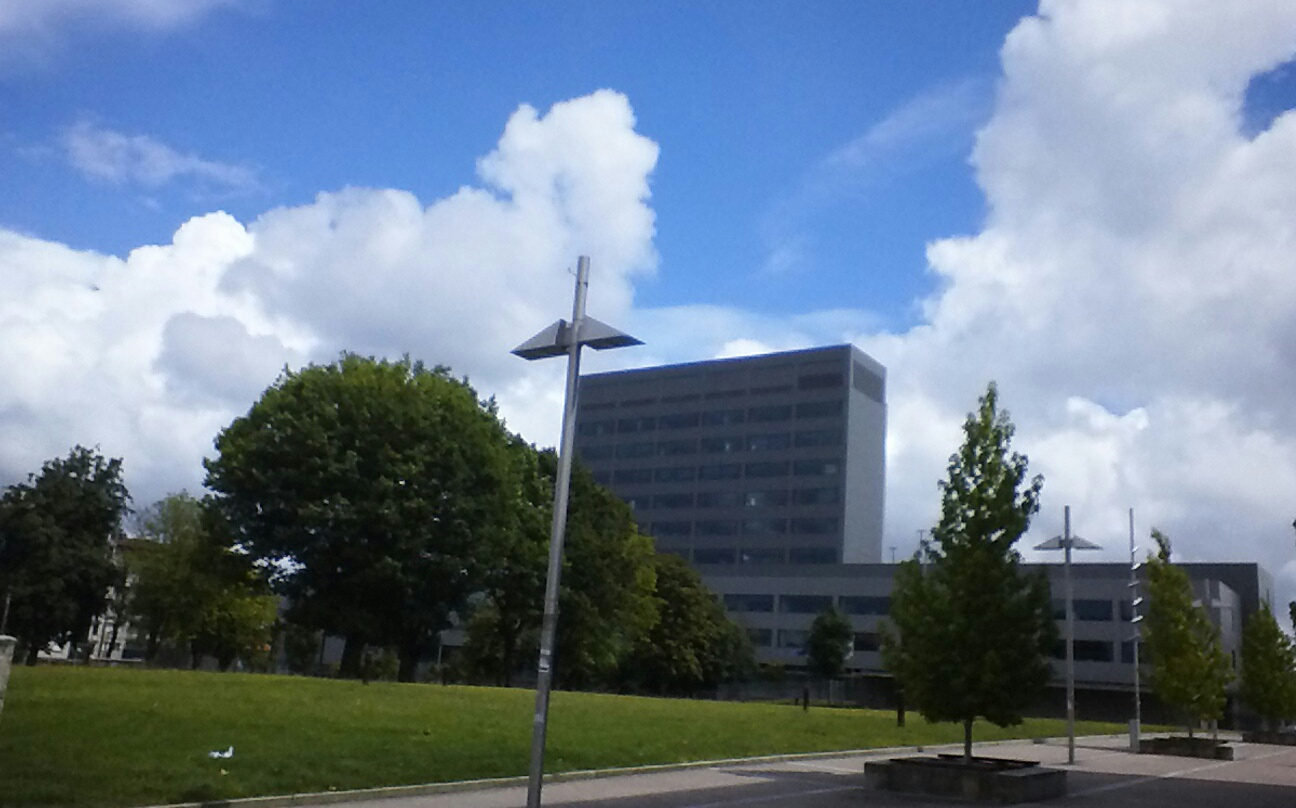

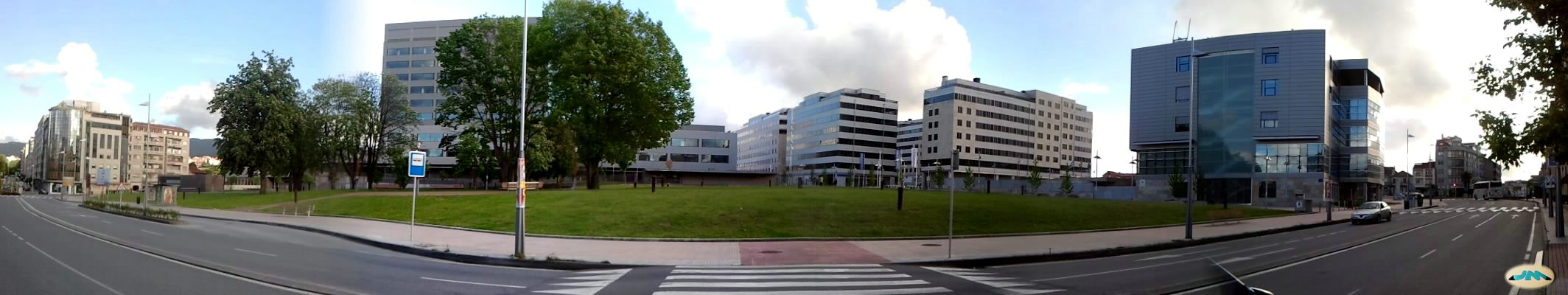

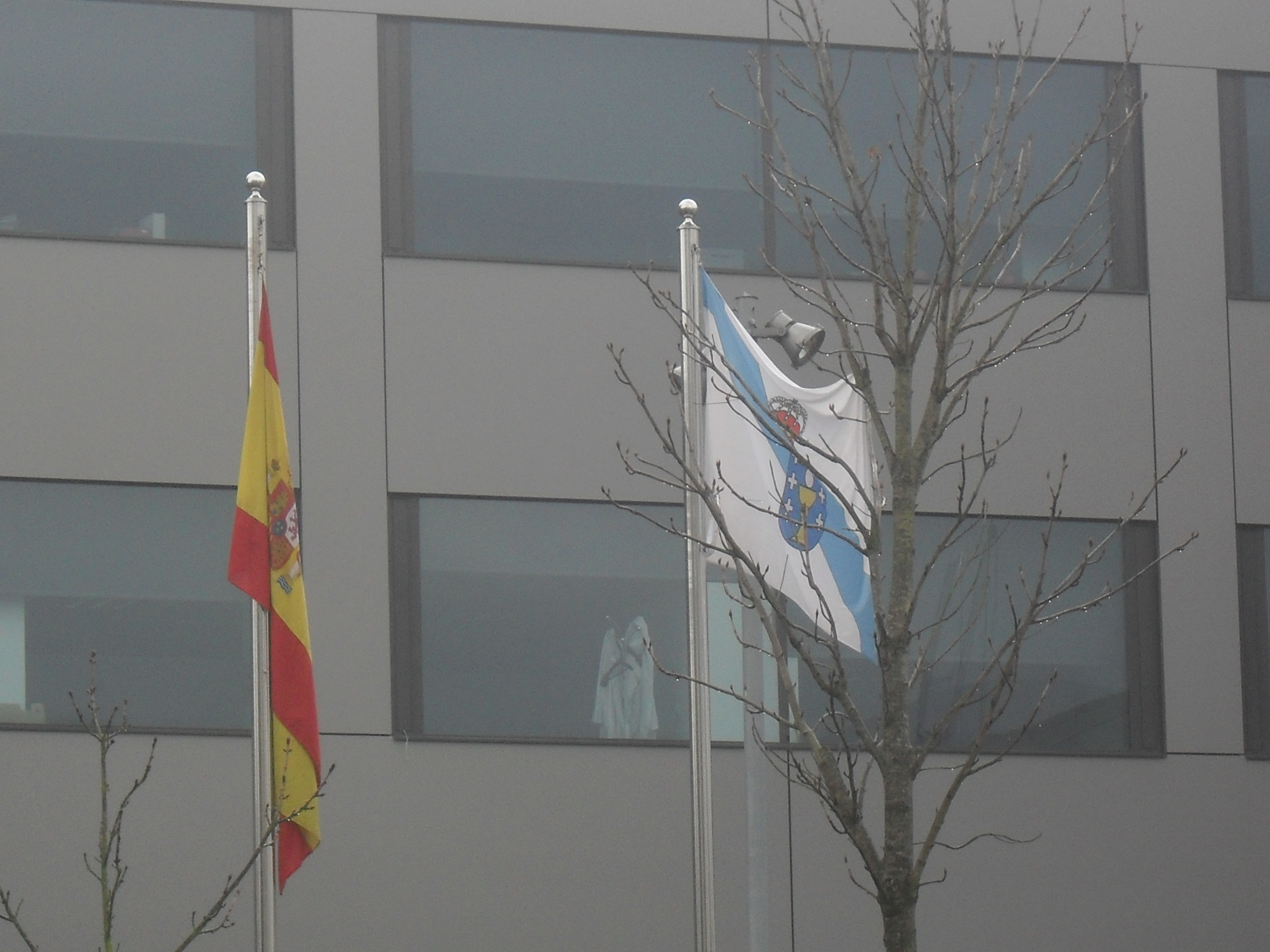

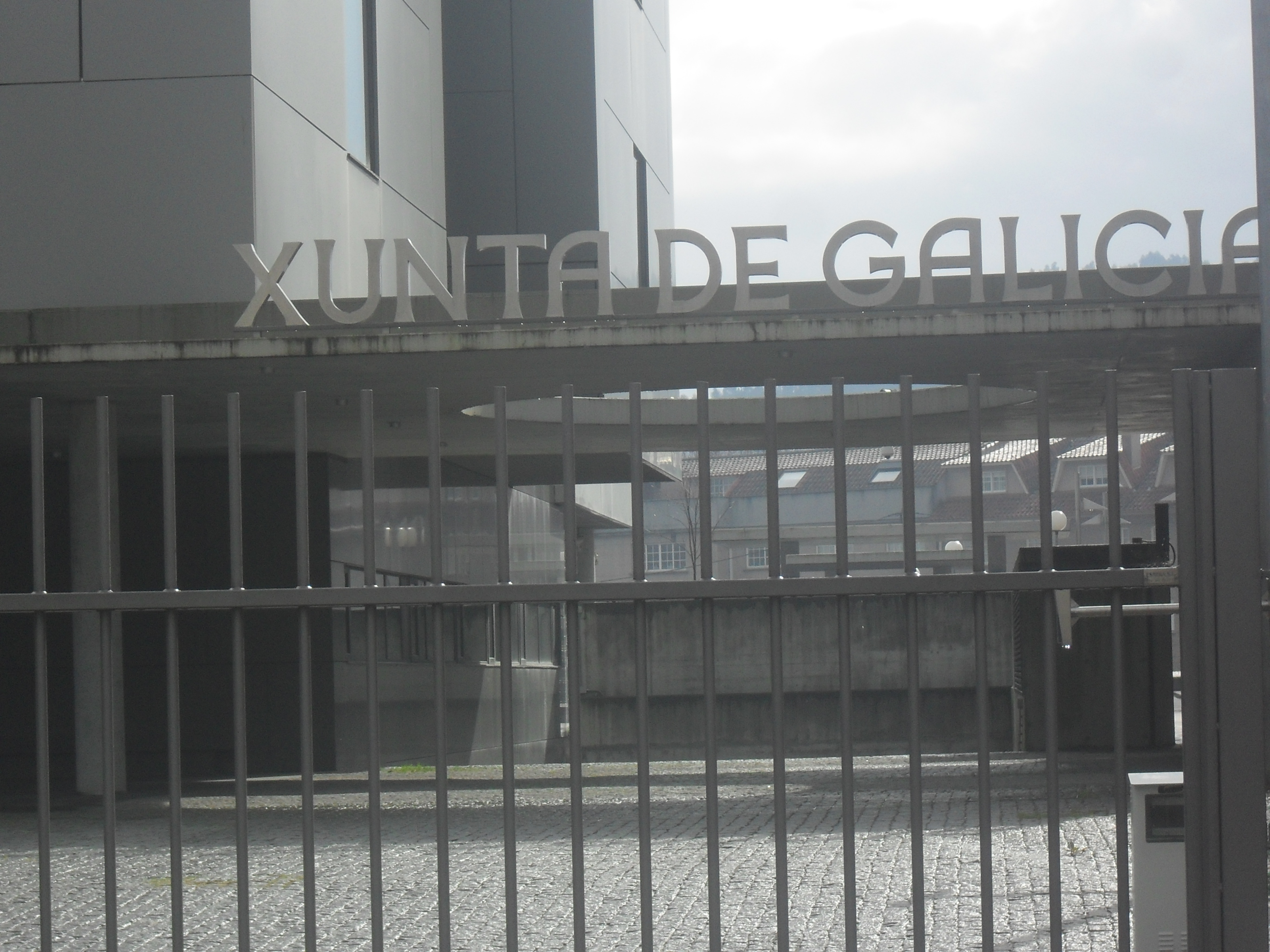

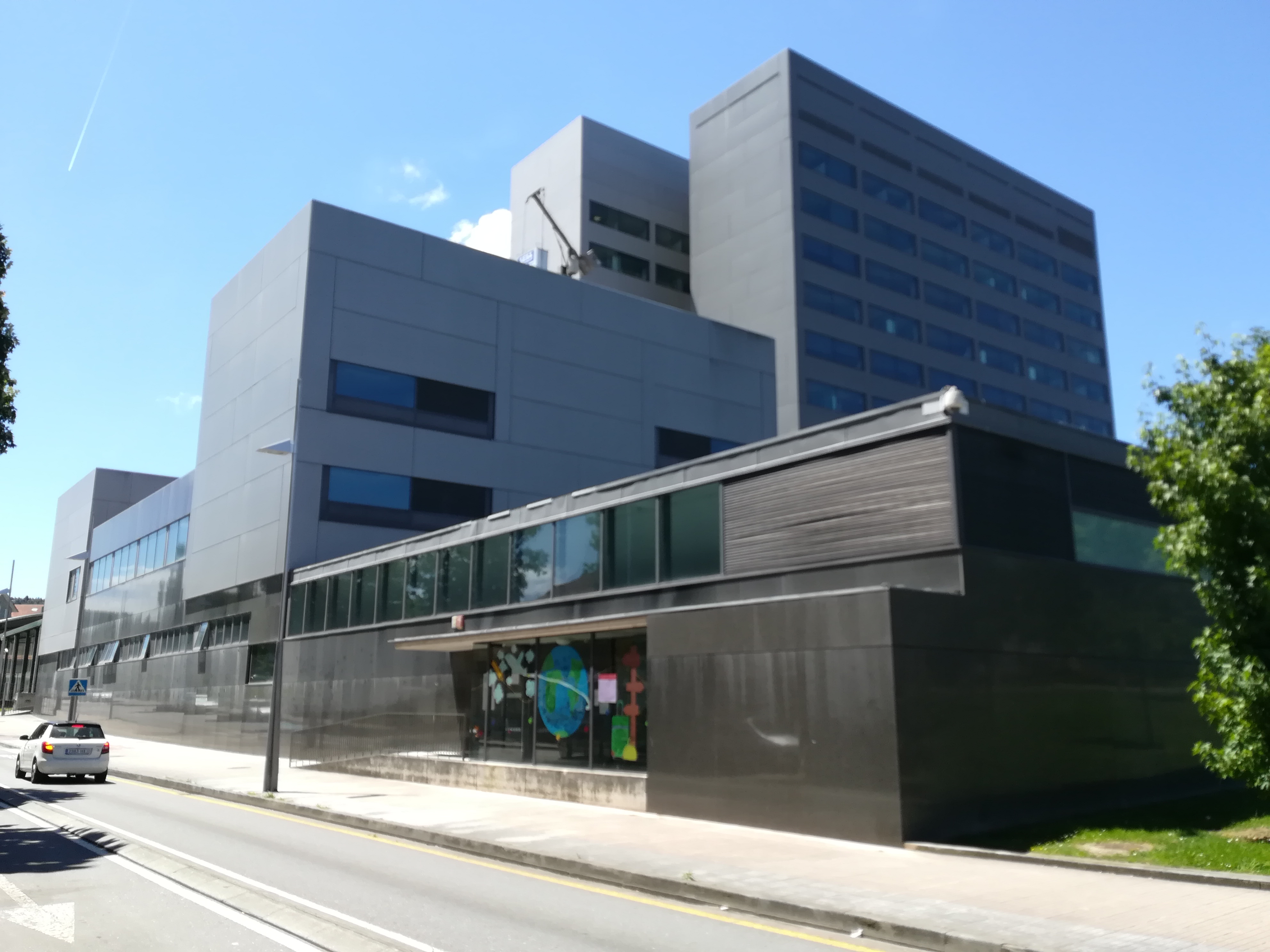

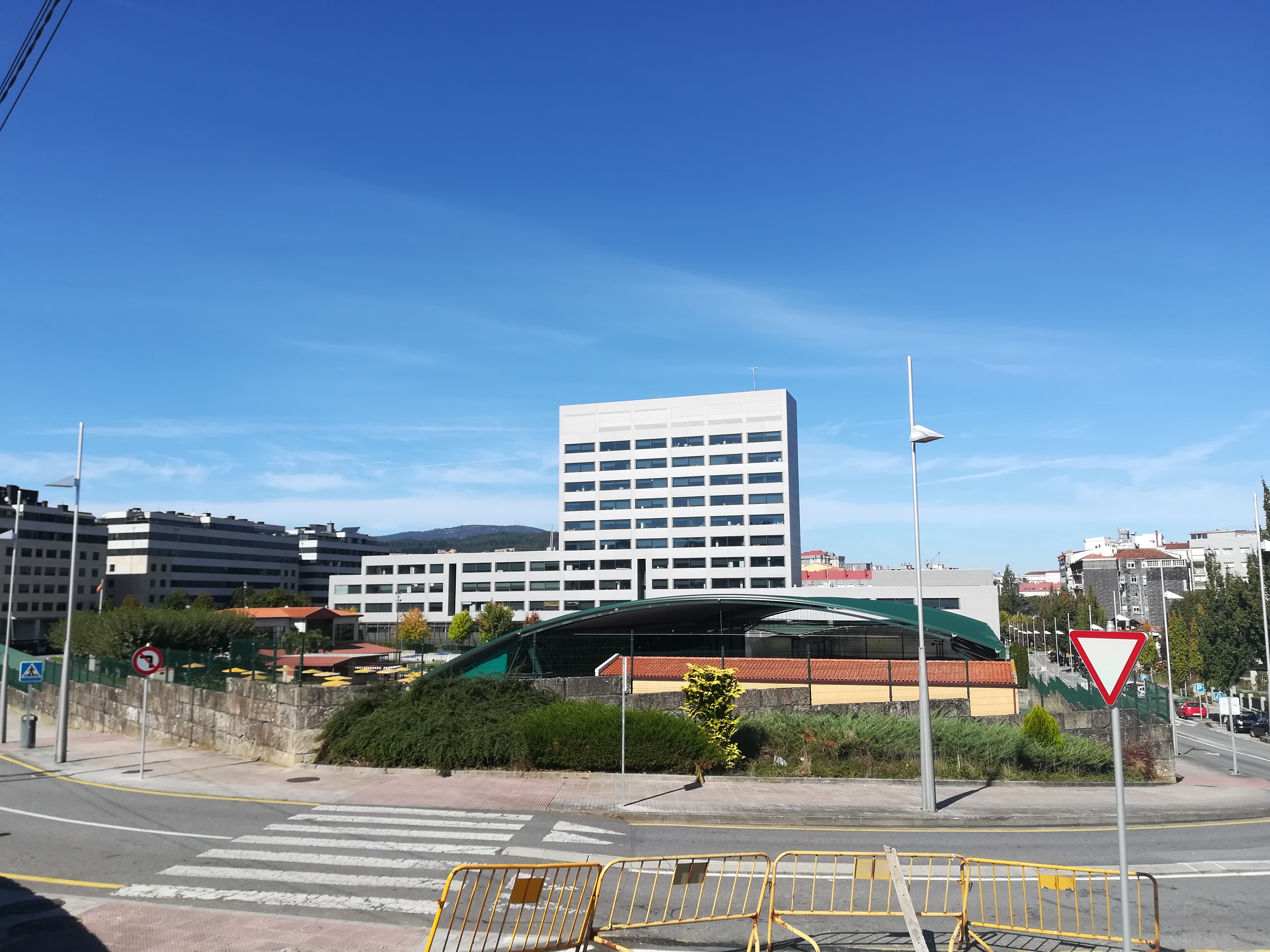
South facade

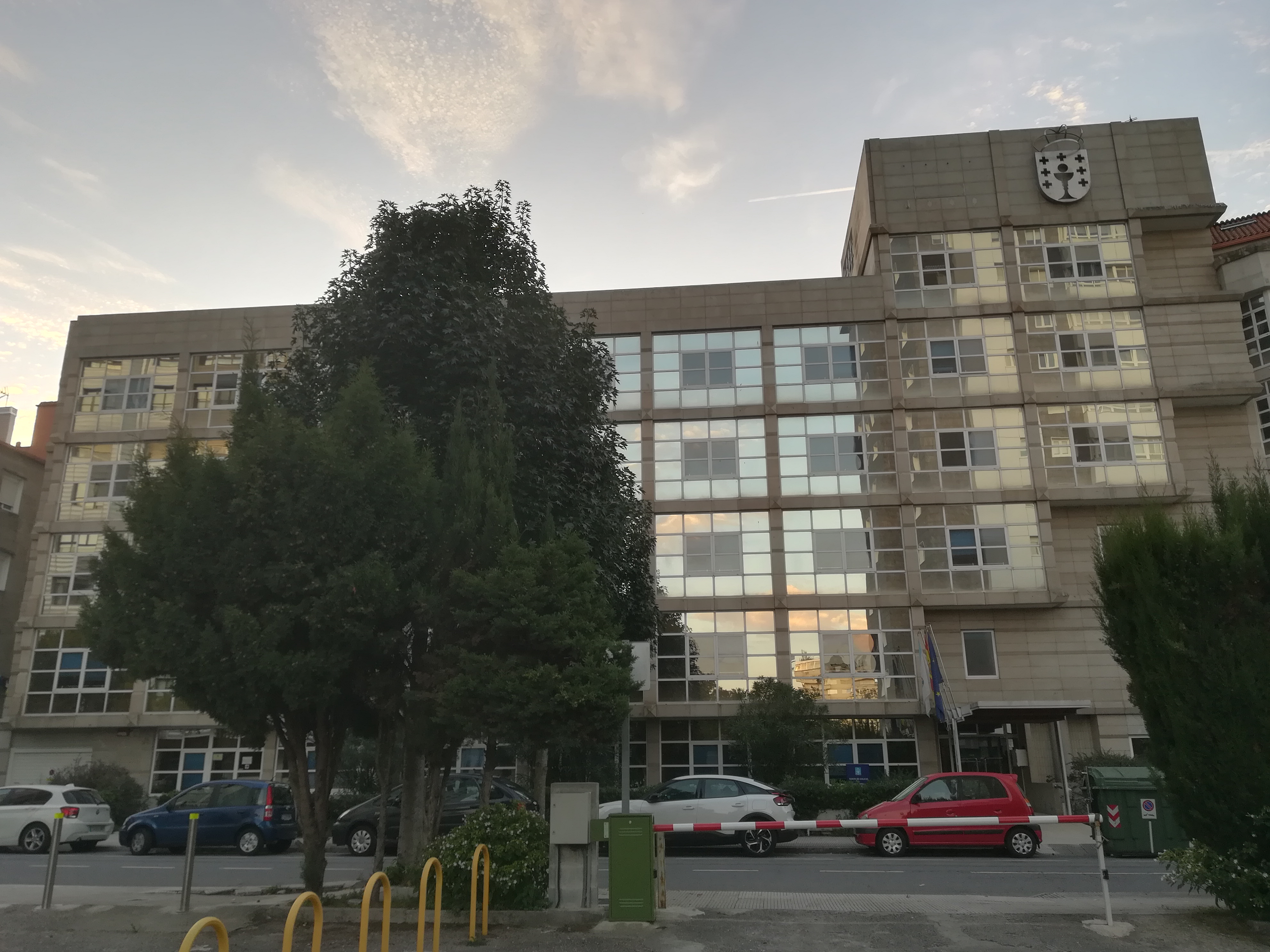
Housing Department in Alcalde Hevia Street

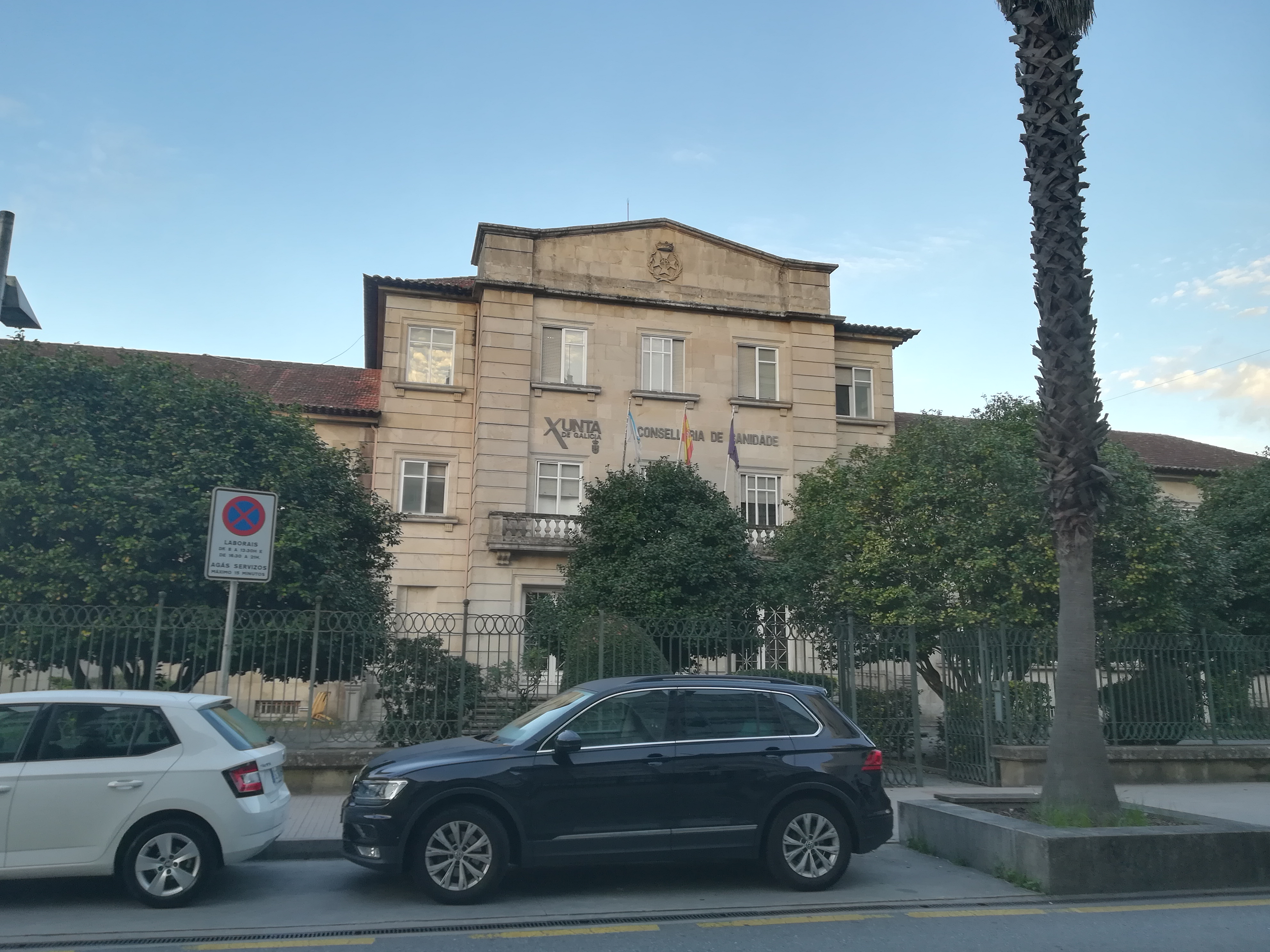
Health Department in Vigo Avenue

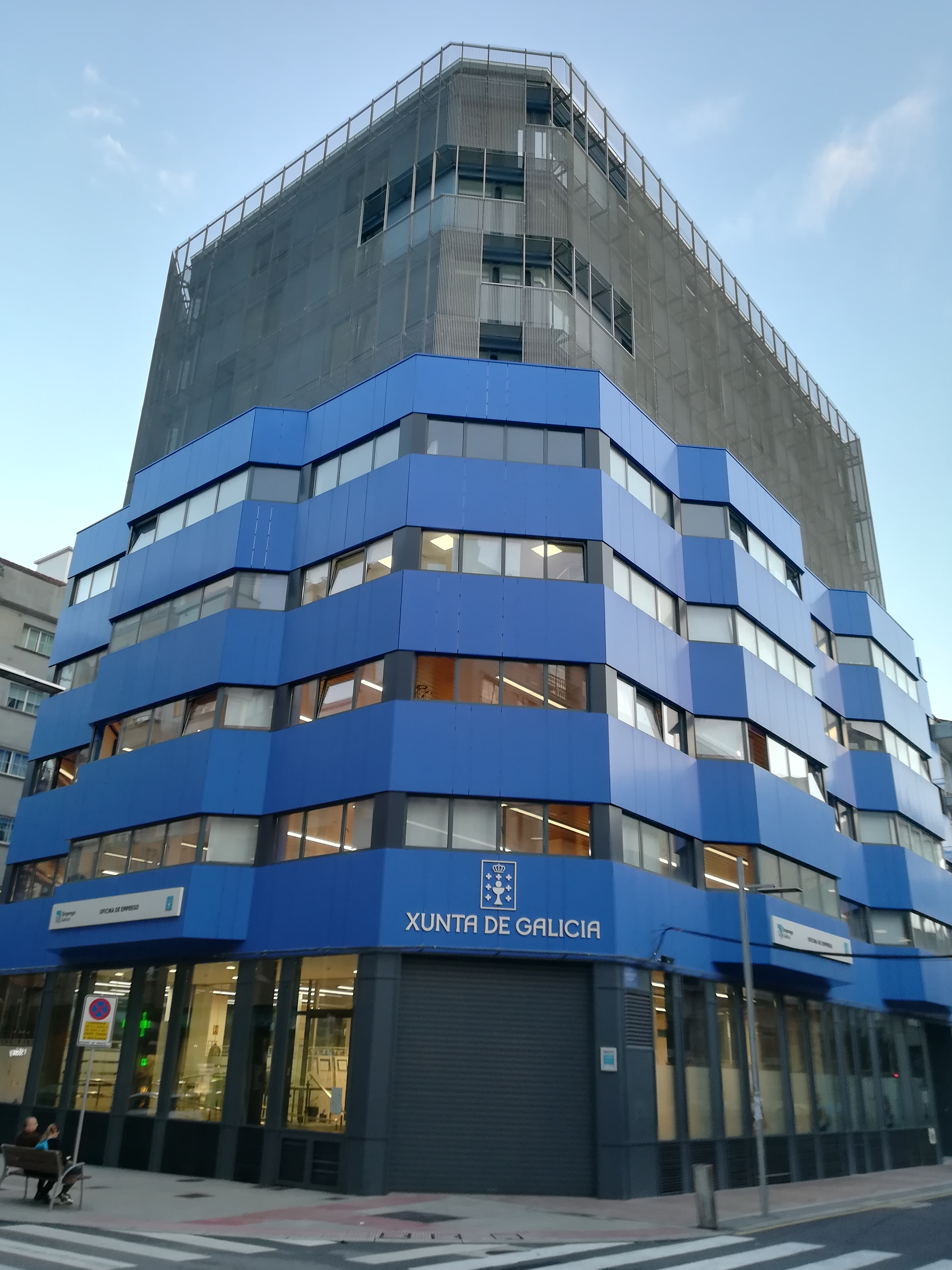
Xunta de Galicia building in Benito Corbal street

== See also ==
=== Bibliography ===
- González Caporale, Alejandro (2008). Edificio Administrativo da Xunta de Galicia en Campolongo-Pontevedra (in Spanish). Barcelona: Grupo San José.
- González Vicente, Manuel (2010). Revista Arquitectura COAM Nº 360 Segundo trimestre 2010 (in Spanish). Madrid: Madrid-Zurich. pp. 28–33. ISSN 0004-2706.

=== Related articles ===
- Manuel Gallego Jorreto
- Xunta de Galicia

=== External links ===
- (es) Edificio Administrativo Campolongo Xunta de Galicia
- (es) Arquitectura en Galicia: Administración en Pontevedra
- (es) Edificio Administrativo de la Xunta de Galicia en Campolongo
