= Xosé Bar Boo =

Spanish architect and professor

- Born: September 25, 1922; Vigo, Spain
- Died: February 21, 1994; Santiago de Compostela, Spain
- Education: Higher Technical School of Architecture of Madrid
- Occupation: Architect

Xosé Bar Boo (September 25, 1922 – February 21, 1994) was a Spanish architect and professor, known for introducing the ideas of modern architecture in Galicia.

== Biography ==
Born in Vigo in 1922, Bar Boo developed an early inclination towards architecture and design, and as a teenager he designed furniture for his family home that was reminiscent of Marcel Breuer's work. He graduated as an architect from the Madrid School of Architecture in 1957 and obtained his doctorate from the same institution in 1960. Although his main work is centred in the city of Vigo, he carried out his professional work throughout Galicia, both in public works and, above all, in housing, including single-family homes. Some of his works, such as the Plastibar Building, are listed in Docomomo International, the catalogue of the most representative buildings of contemporary architecture. His work has been considered faithful to the “classical rationalist language” and highly perfectionist. He was dean of the Official Association of Architects of Galicia (Colegio Oficial de Arquitectos de Galicia) —an institution he also co-founded— between 1977 and 1979, vice-president of the Higher Council of Architects of Spain and Professor at the School of Architecture of the University of A Coruña.

== Projects ==
His first work, the Plastibar Building in Vigo, is considered one of the most important architectural works of the second half of the 20th century in Galicia. Subsequently, the Spanish economic miracle resulted in a proliferation of larger-scale commissions and new types of projects: markets, clinics, churches, industrial buildings, etc.

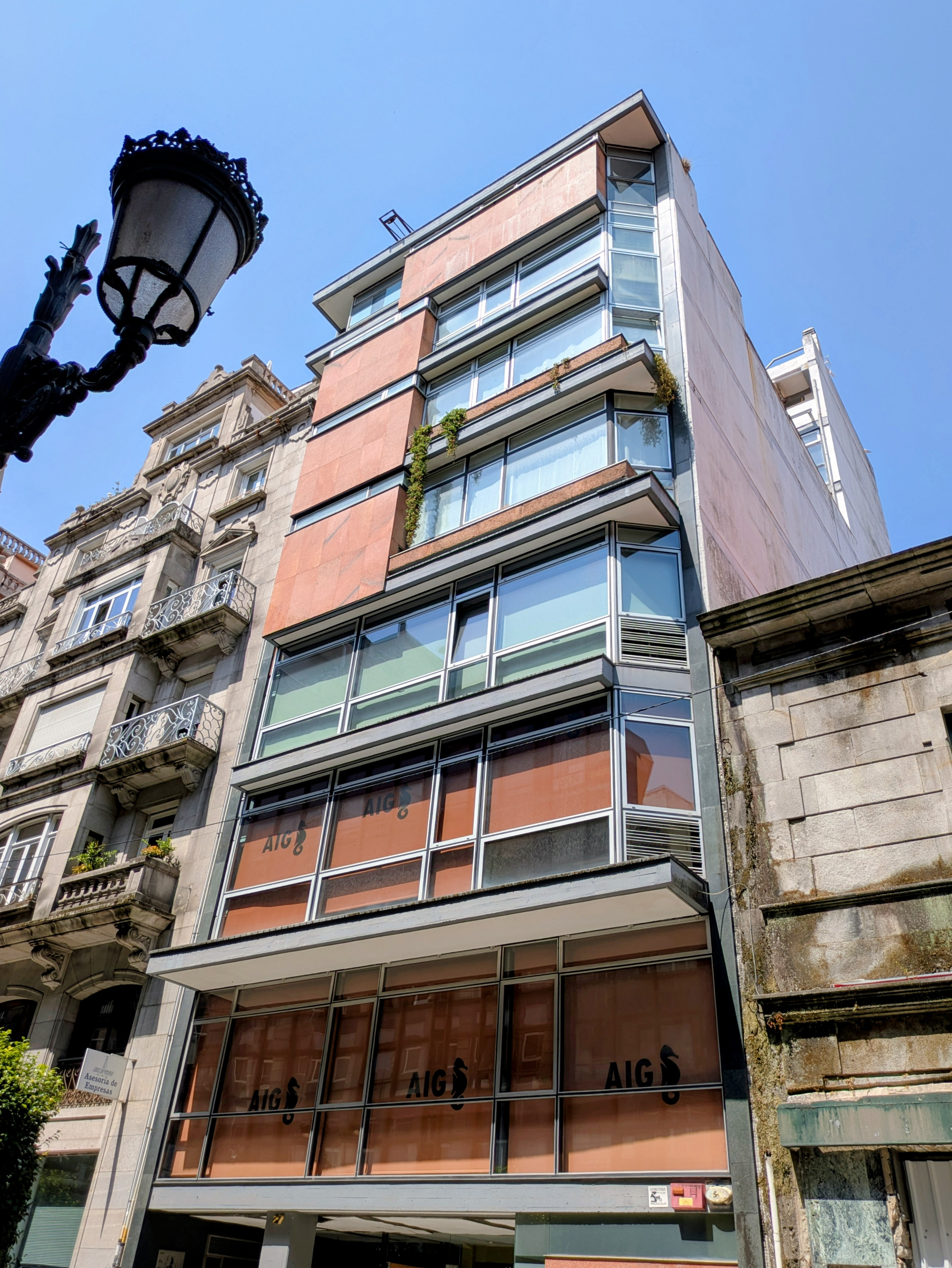
Plastibar Building, Vigo, 1957

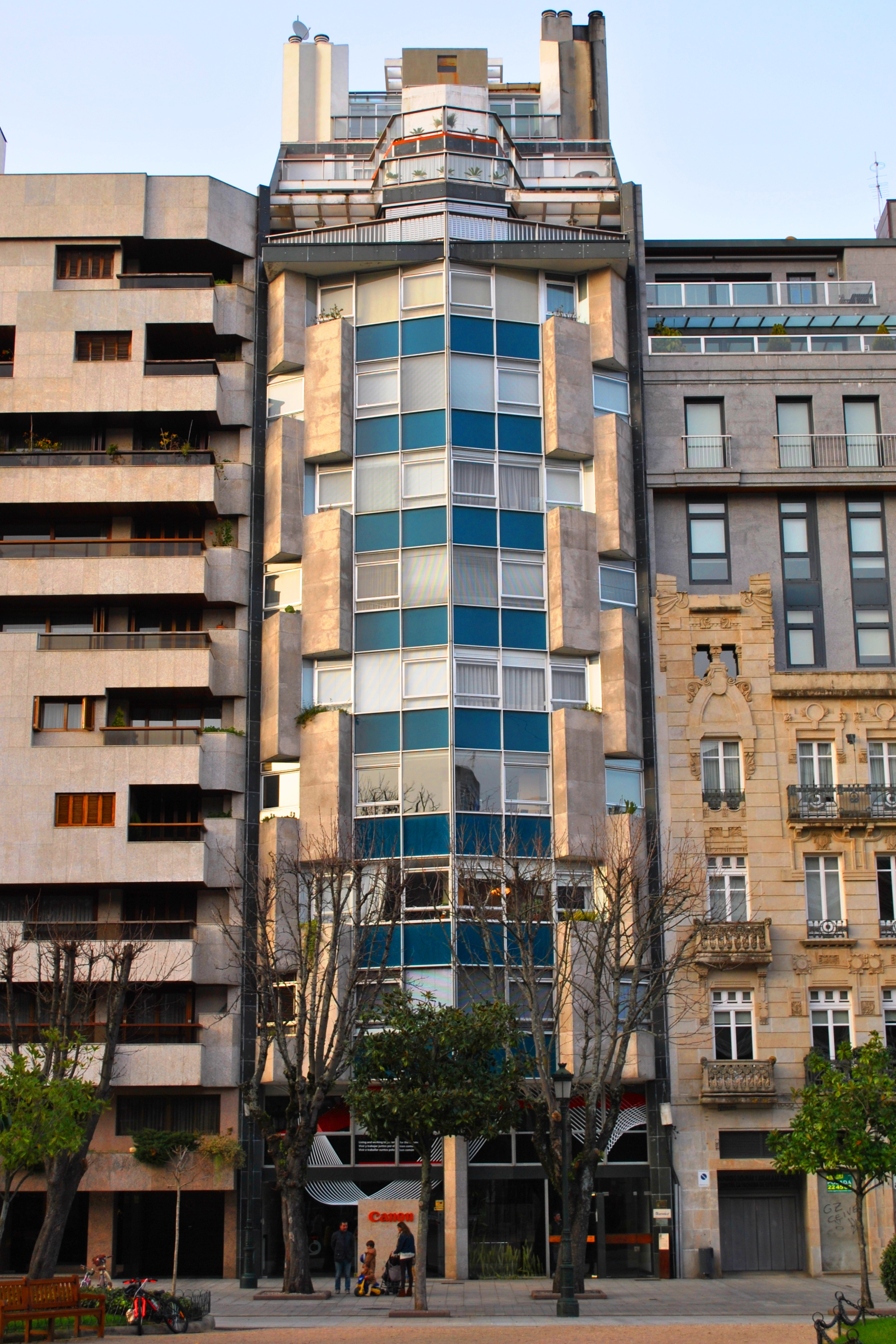
Building in Compostela Square, Vigo, 1963

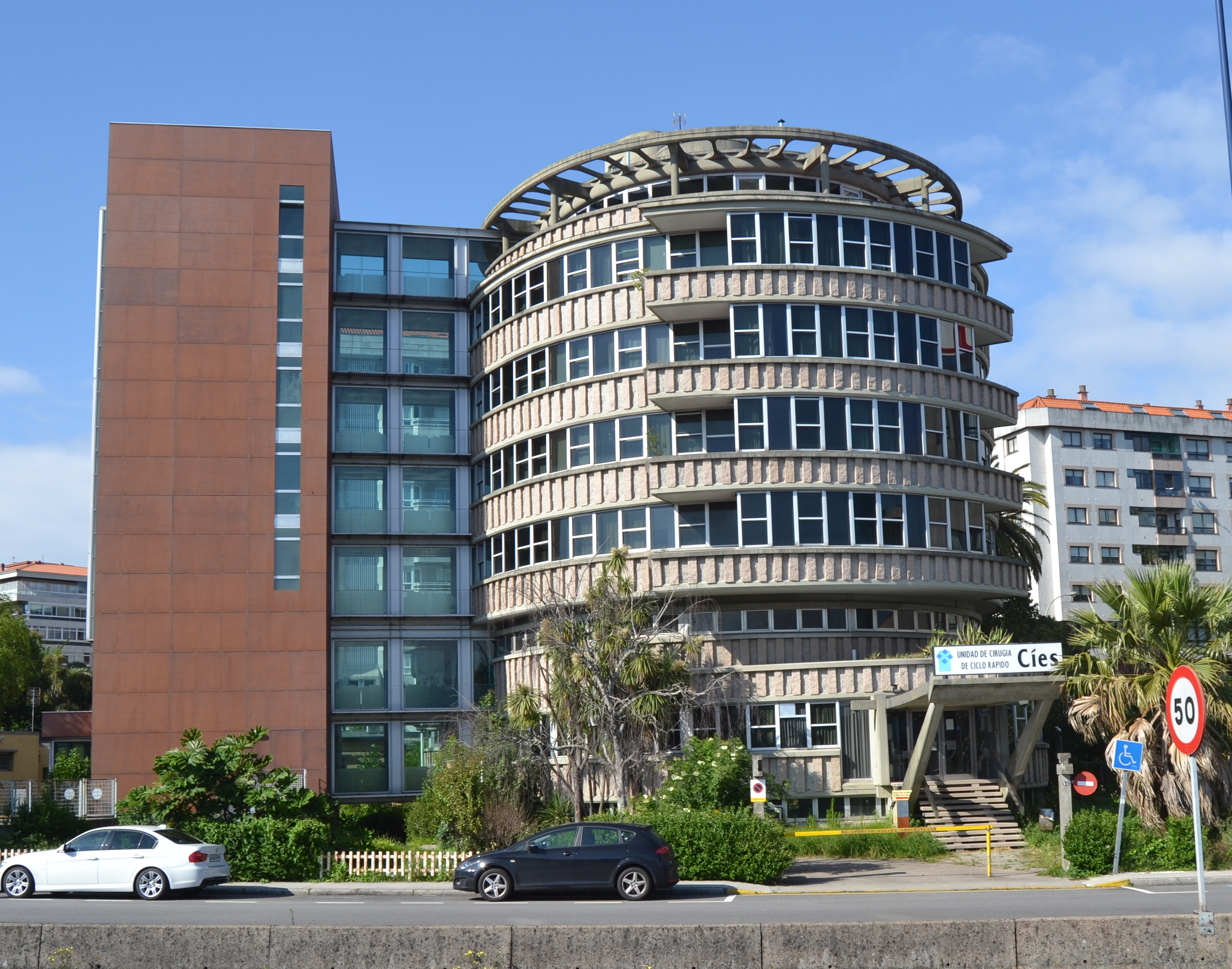
Policlínico Cíes, Vigo, 1967. The prism on the left is a later addition.

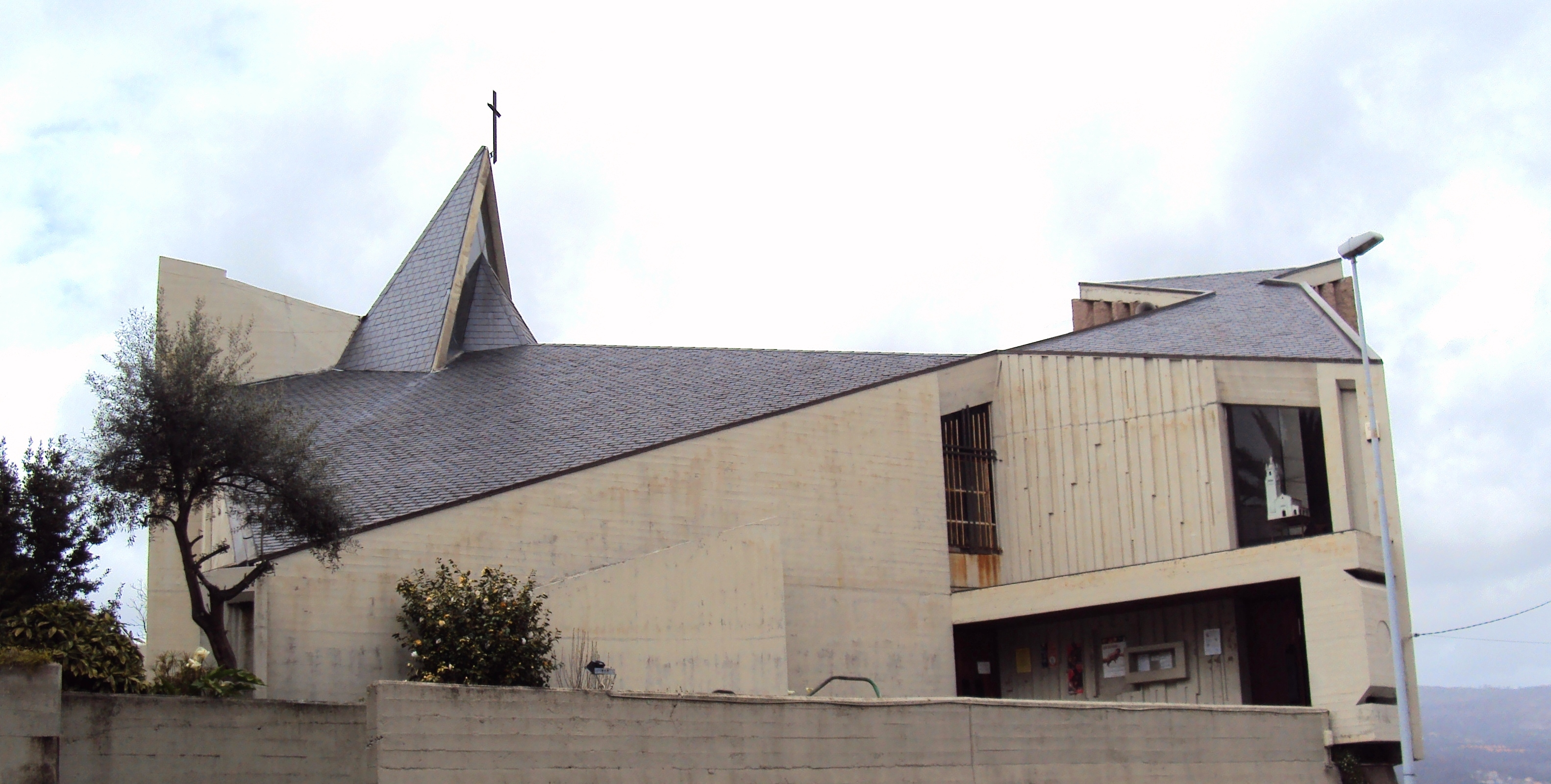
Church of Nosa Señora das Neves, Teis, 1968

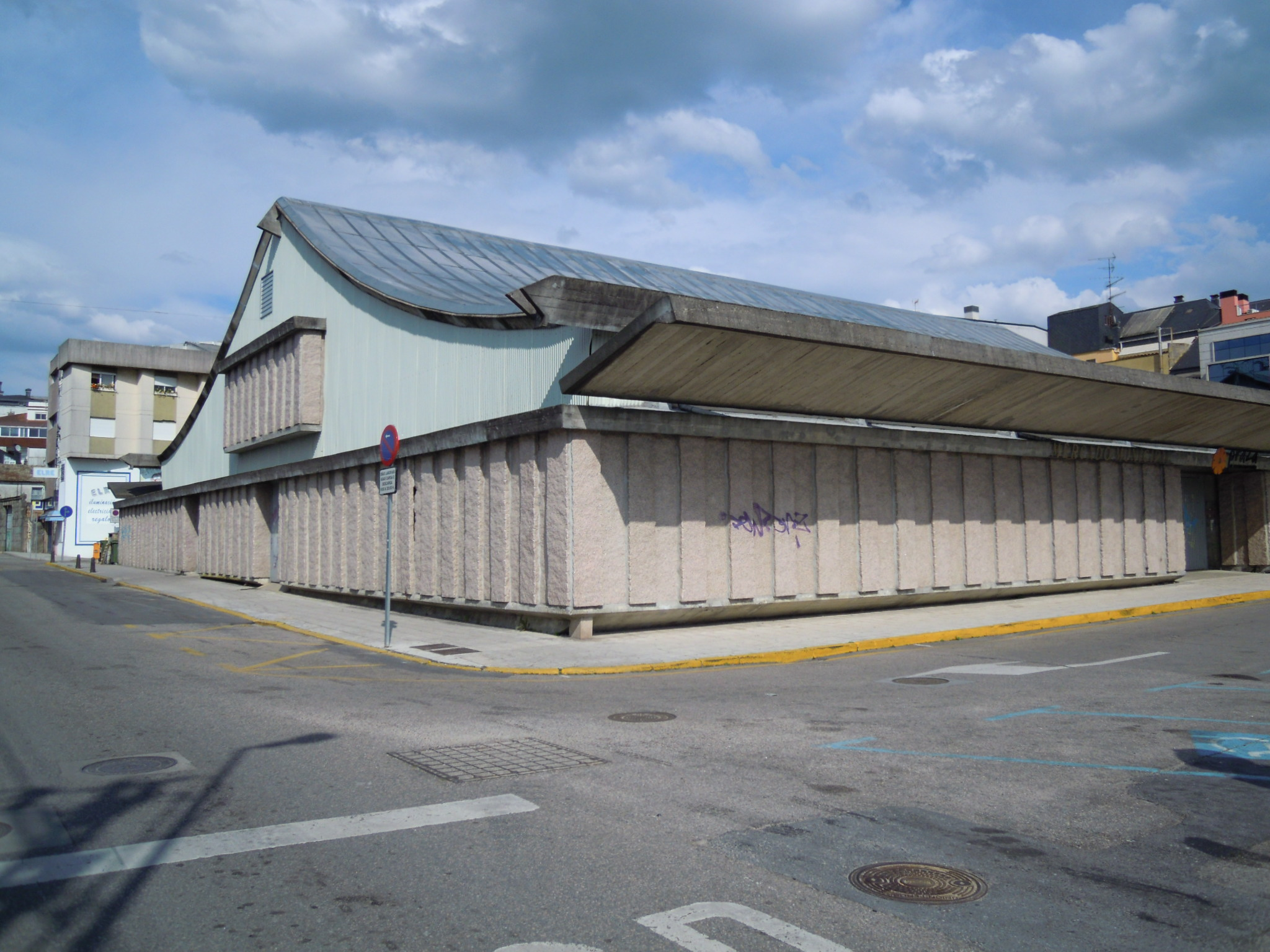
Market, O Porriño, 1970
