= Carrefour Planet =

French hypermarket chain owned by Carrefour Group

- Type: Hypermarket
- Founded: 2010
- Headquarters: Massy, France
- Area served: Belgium, France, Greece, Spain
- Parent: Carrefour Group
- Website: carrefour.fr

Carrefour Planet is a hypermarket chain concept owned by the Carrefour Group.

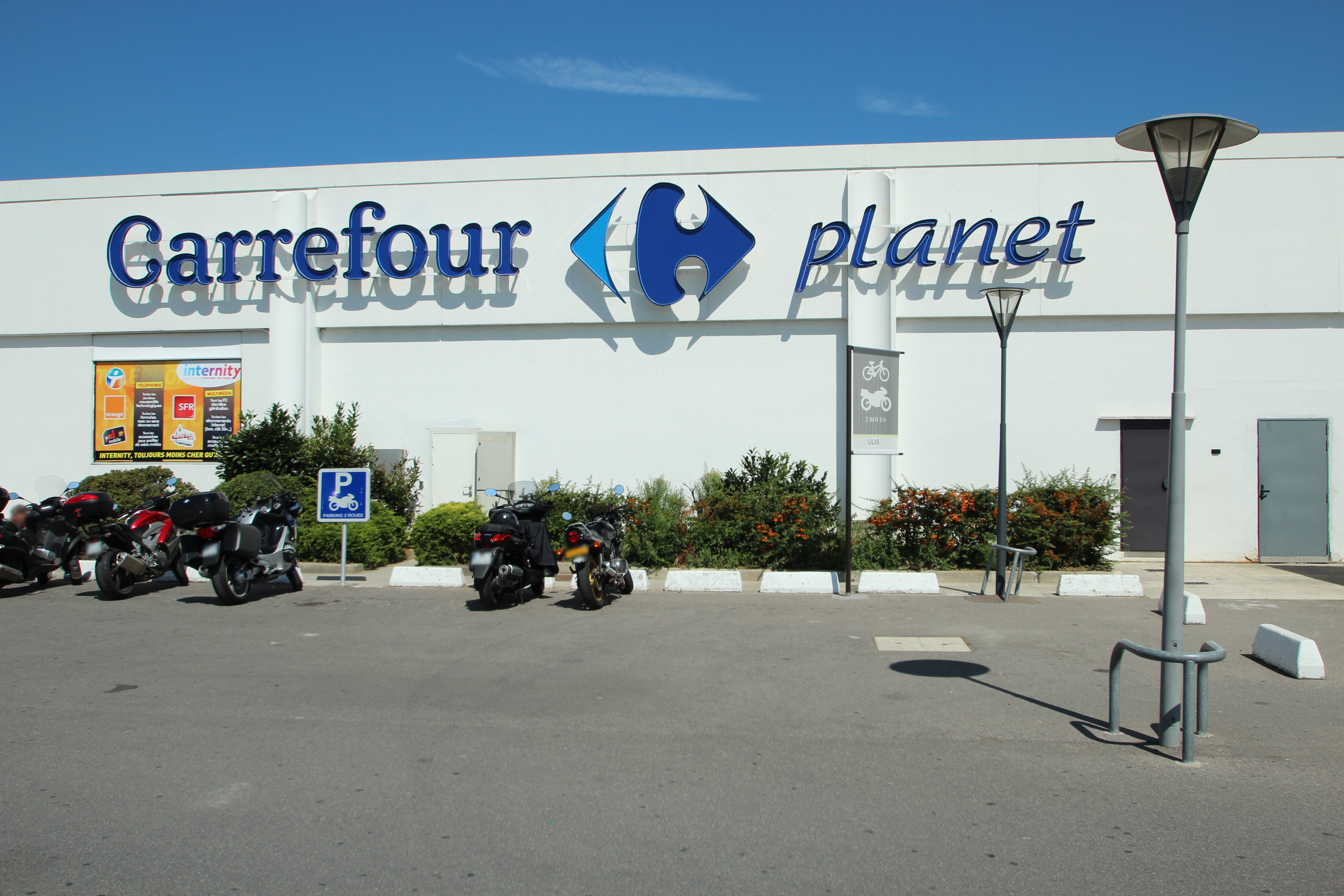
A Carrefour Planet store

Carrefour Planet was created as a new-generation hypermarket, the hypermarkets were divided into 8 centers; marché (Market), bio, surgélés (frozen food), beauté (beauty), mode, bébé (baby), maison (home) and loisirs-multimédia (leisure-multimedia) and proposed services such as day care, a barbershop or hairdressing services.

== History ==
In 2010, the first stores were tested in France in Écully, Vénissieux and Lattes, in Spain in El Pinar and in Belgium in Mont-Saint-Jean.

In 2011, in France, 6 regular Carrefour hypermarkets became Carrefour Planet in Essonne, La Ville-du-Bois, Les Ulis, Villabé Athis-Mons, Vitrolles and Wasquehal.

In July 2011, the first Carrefour Planet was opened in Paderno Dugnano, Italy of 13,000 square meters.

In 2012, it was announced that the transformation from Carrefour to Carrefour Planet costs too much, as a result Carrefour stops further process of converting Carrefour hypermarkets, hypermarkets already converted to Planet stays as-is but loses the Planet sign in France.

As of August 2013, there are still 15 Carrefour Planet stores in Belgium, 1 in Greece and 1 in Italy.

== See also ==
- Carrefour
- Carrefour Market
- Carrefour Express
