= Pontevedra Central Post Office =

Art Nouveau Post Office in Pontevedra, Spain

- Casa de Correos y Telégrafos de Pontevedra
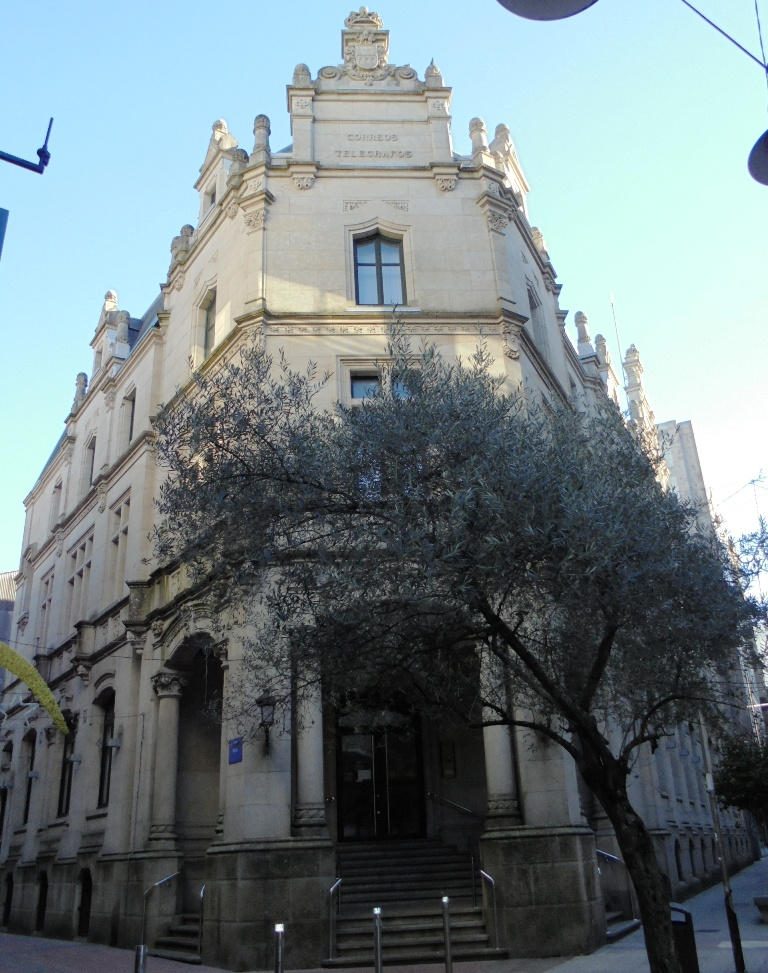
- Central Post Office entrance
- Interactive map of the Pontevedra Central Post Office area

General information
- Type: Post Office
- Architectural style: Art Nouveau
- Location: Pontevedra, Galicia, Spain
- Coordinates: 42°25′48.1″N 8°38′41.6″W
- Construction started: 1915
- Completed: 1929
- Opening: 1930
- Cost: 348,967 pesetas
- Owner: Correos
- Operator: Correos

Technical details
- Floor count: 4

Design and construction
- Architect: Carlos Gato Soldevilla
- Main contractor: Cándido Casalderrey

Website
- Official website

The Post and Telecommunications Palace of Pontevedra is a building between Oliva and García Camba streets, in the heart of the commercial and financial centre of Pontevedra, Spain. Since its construction, it has been the main headquarters of Correos in the city and in the province of Pontevedra. In front of its main façade there is an olive tree which gave its name to Olive Street.

== History ==
In the 19th century Pontevedra needed a central post office in keeping with its status as the capital of its province. In 1908, the Minister of the Interior, Juan de la Cierva y Peñafiel, announced the construction of a new post office building in the city. In 1910, work began on finding land for the building. In 1911, the Council of Ministers approved the construction and a plot of land was chosen between Oliva Street and García Camba Street proposed by the Marquis of Riestra, an irregular six-sided polygon with an area of 800 square metres.

In 1912, the City Council of Pontevedra bought the land from the Marquis of Riestra for one hundred and fifteen thousand pesetas and ceded it to the State. The rules of the competition for the construction of the building were made public in 1913 and the Art Nouveau project of the Madrilenian architect Carlos Gato Soldevilla (author of art nouveau buildings such as the pavilion of the Ministry of Public Works in Madrid) was chosen. The construction of the building was awarded in 1915 to the contractor Cándido Casalderrey for 348,967 pesetas. Work began that year.

The work lasted several years and was interrupted several times due to the lack of payment by the State and the debt accumulated with the contractor. In 1926, 200,000 pesetas were allocated to complete the construction, which had been stalled since 1923. The Post and Telecommunications Palace of Pontevedra was inaugurated in 1929, the year in which the emblematic lions were placed on the south façade of the building as mailboxes for foreign countries and Spain. In May 1930, the building was furnished.

Due to its historical value, at the beginning of the 21st century, in 2001, the architect Enrique Solana de Quesada, also from Madrid, was commissioned to draw up the renovation project for the building. After its renovation, it was reopened to the public on 21 July 2003.

== Description ==
The building belongs to the Art Nouveau style that prevailed in the early years of the 20th century. The architect designed it with northern European buildings in mind. In particular, he wanted it to resemble the Flemish Renaissance style, with the Galician feature of stone construction.

The building, like most Spanish Post office buildings, is articulated around a central courtyard above a public hall. There is another smaller courtyard and around these courtyards all the offices are articulated. The top of the three floors is attic.

The building is made of granite and has a half basement, a ground floor, two upper floors and an attic. The openings in the walls of the first floor have Lintels and those of the top floor have arched lintels with a double arch. On the ground floor there is a large frieze at ceiling level.

The main entrance is presented in the corner as a chamfer with arches resting on classical columns and stone stairs leading to a raised entrance hall. It is decorated with geometric stone figures on the façade, especially at the attic level, and geometric windows on each of the levels. The upper level above the main entrance is crowned by the stone coat of arms of the city.

On the south façade there are two bronze lions (the only original ones in Galicia) whose mouths serve as windows for the introduction of mail for foreign countries and for Spain and represent the guard and security of both the building and the correspondence.

The bright interior combines the use of materials such as glass, wood and plaster, highlighting the magnificent coloured glass vault, the central element of which is the coat of arms of the city of Pontevedra with its bridge, calvary, old castle and crenellated tower. On the ceiling of the large room in which the public life of the building takes place, there is a beautiful Stained glass window showing the city's coat of arms, using the grisaille technique. There are 2,452 pieces of glass which form a surface of 98 square metres.

The city's coat of arms is 4 metres high and 2.52 metres wide and is surrounded by a border of 20 rosaces. Restored in 2003, it has been restored to its full splendour thanks to the work of the Azpilcueta company of A Coruña. The technique used to draw the coat of arms on the glass is grisaille, in which the pigment is removed, as the colour brings it closer to the glass itself. This technique also seeks to prevent the light from passing through the glass, thus creating new sensations in the space.

Oil painting in general and imitations in bronze, gilding, Mosaics, Ceramics and artistic stained glass were used in the decoration of the central hall.

In 1916, the architect of the central post office in Pontevedra, Carlos Gato Soldevilla, also designed the building for the central post office in Burgos.

== Gallery ==
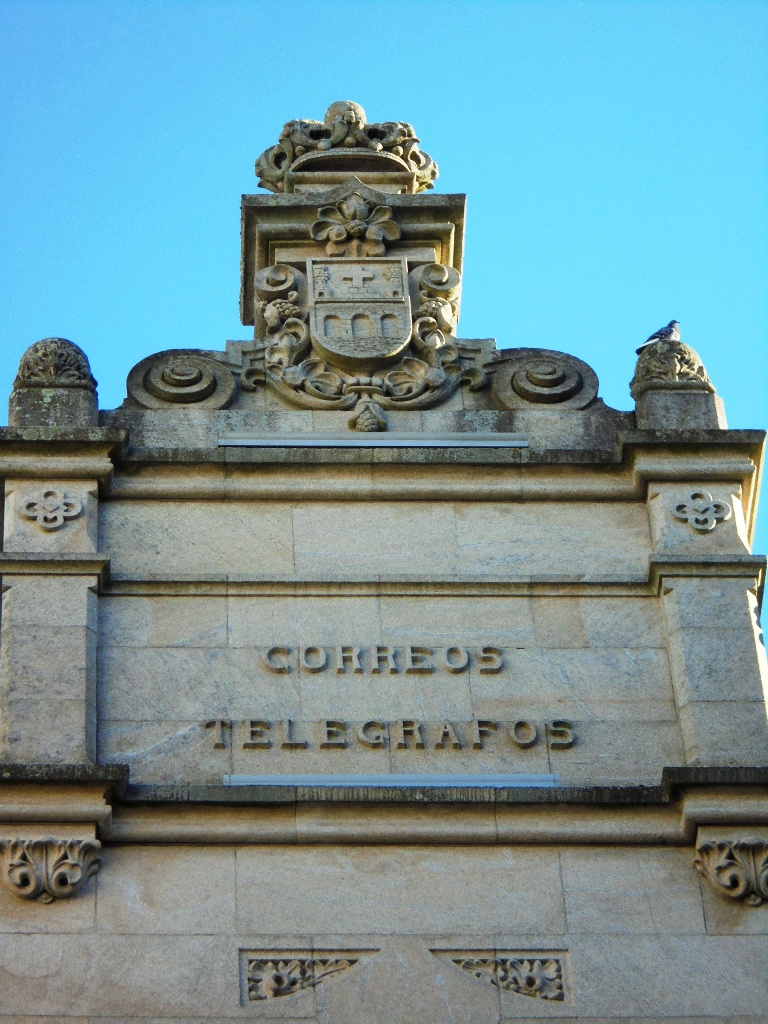
City coat of arms on top of both facades

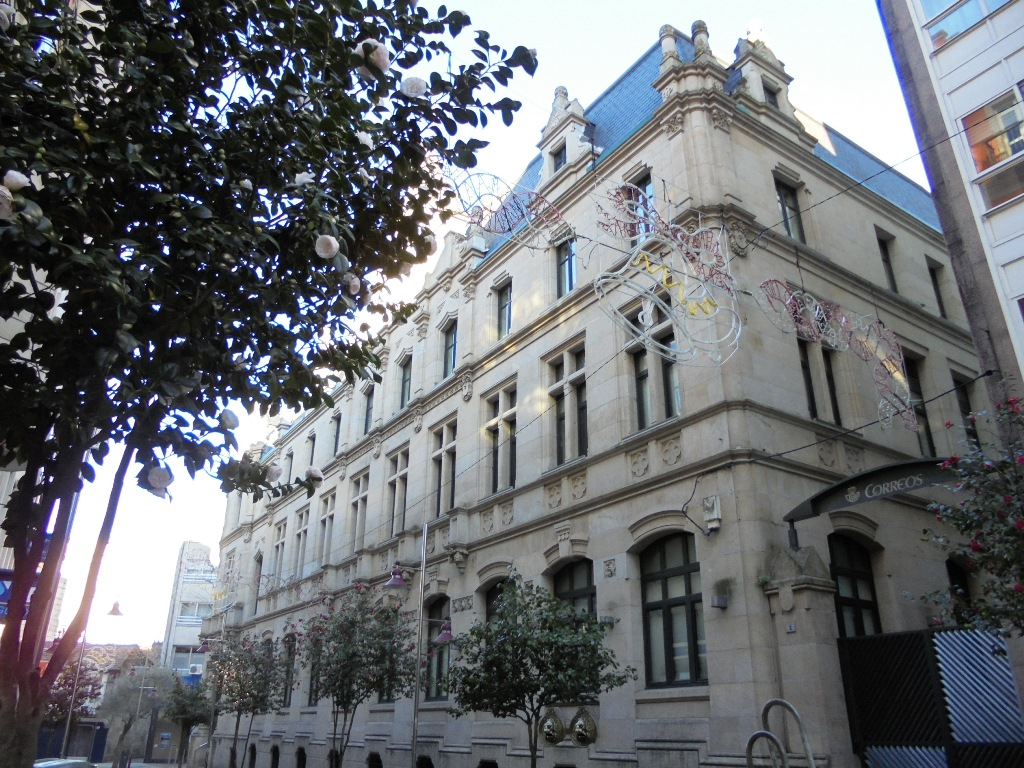
García Camba Street façade

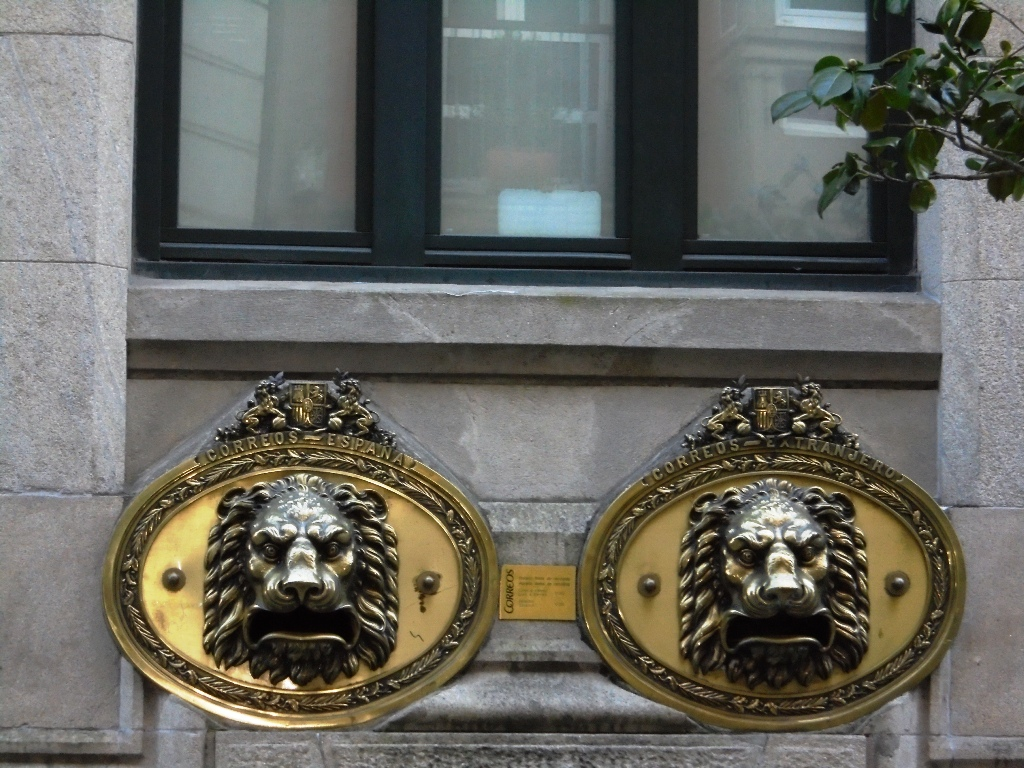
The two lion's head mailboxes

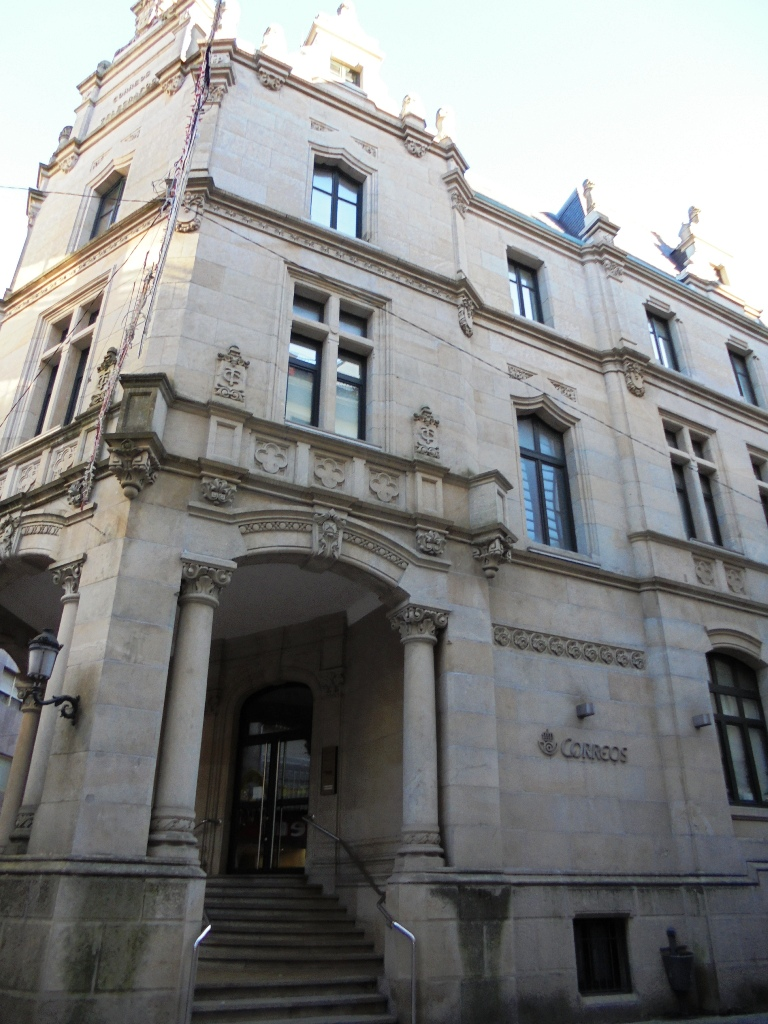
Detail of the side entrance

== See also ==
=== Bibliography ===
- Fontoira Surís, Rafael, 2009: Pontevedra monumental, Pontevedra, Députation de Pontevedra, ISBN 978-84-8457-327-2 (p.431)

=== Related articles ===
- Café Moderno (Pontevedra)
- Bâtiment Gran Garaje
- Valle-Inclán High School
- Bank of Spain Building (Pontevedra)
