= Calle de la Oliva =

Street in Pontevedra, Spain

Oliva Street
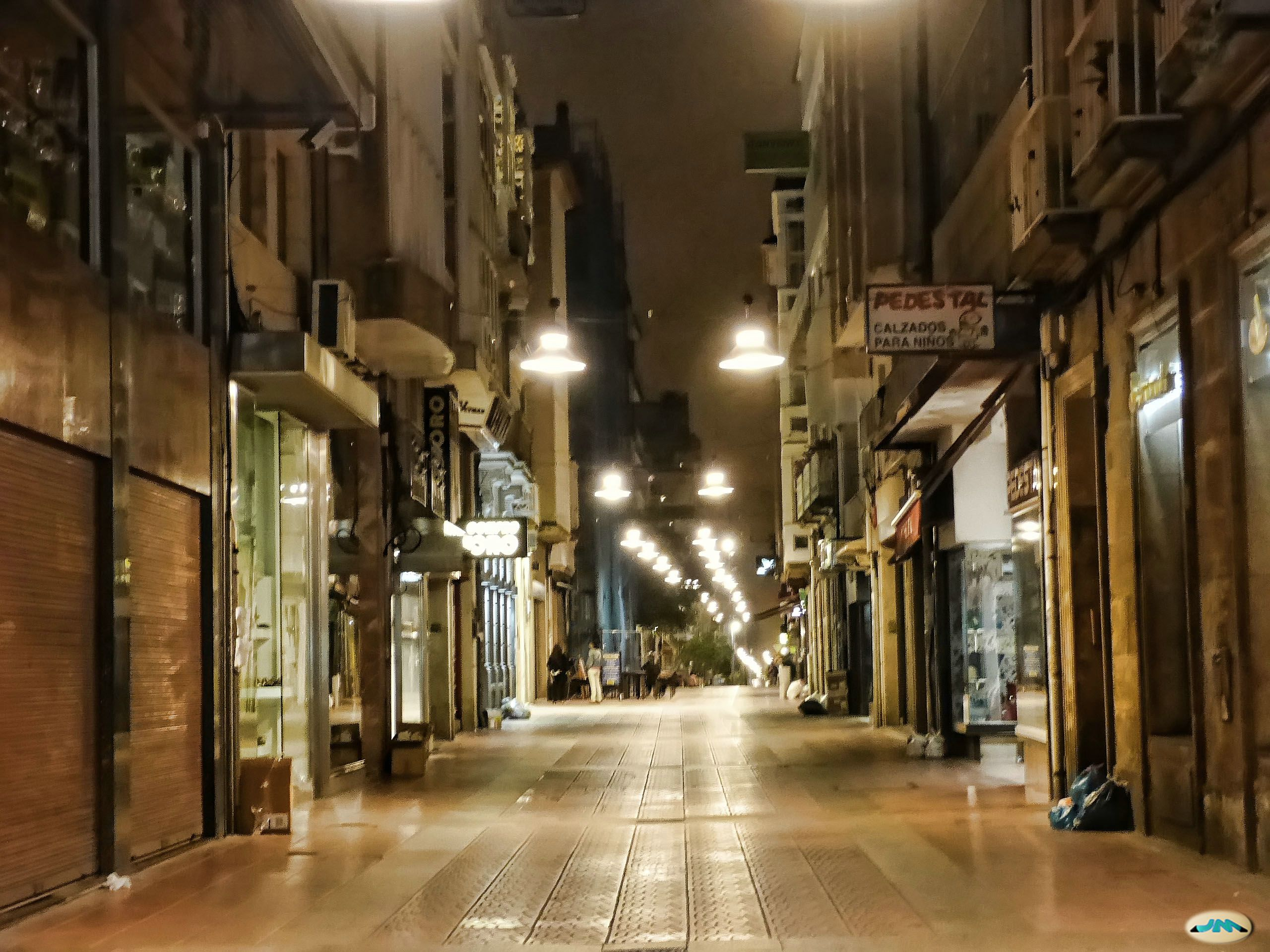
- Oliva Street, by night
- Native name: Rúa da Oliva (Spanish)
- Type: Street
- Maintained by: Pontevedra City Council
- Location: Pontevedra, Spain
- Postal code: 36001
- Coordinates: 42.430111°N 8.645056°W

The Calle de la Oliva (Galician: Rúa da Oliva), is a street in Pontevedra (Spain) located in the city centre, on the edge of the old town. It is one of the main streets of Pontevedra and one of the most commercial.

== Origin of the name ==
The street is called Oliva Street because of the presence of an olive tree on the site where the street originated.

== History ==
After being designated the provincial capital in 1833, in the mid-19th century Pontevedra improved its road links with other Galician cities. Between 1847 and 1851, Oliva Street and the current Rosalía de Castro Street were built, and their extension in the form of a road linked the city to Marín via Mollavao.

The 1854 project already included the traditional name of Oliva Street. Traders soon moved into the street and Oliva Street soon became a shopping street. A few years after it opened in Michelena Street in 1856, the famous Suárez jeweller's and watchmaker's shop moved to the corner of Oliva Street and Peregrina Square in 1861.

On 25 July 1888, Oliva Street became the first street in Galicia (along with neighbouring Michelena Street) to have public lighting, thanks to the installation of electric arcs and incandescent lamps. This first Galician electricity network was the work of the Marquis of Riestra, who built the first electricity factory in the northwest of the Iberian peninsula in the Verdura square, and who in 1887 obtained a patent for a process for adjusting the dynamos.

Between 1889 and 1890, the writer Concepción Arenal lived on the first floor of Oliva Street 27, where she organised a meeting of intellectuals.

In 1895, the street was called Elduayen and its course went from the Peregrina square to Mollavao. In 1901, the street reverted to its traditional name of Oliva.

In the first decades of the 20th century, the street was home to well-known printers, bookshops and toy shops: the Francisco Viñas bookshop at number 6, the Julio Antúnez bookshop and printing works next door, and the Melero bazaar at number 13.

In 1915, the construction of the new central post office building, located in Oliva Street, began and was completed in 1929.

In 1927, when King Alfonso XIII and Queen Victoria Eugenie visited Pontevedra, Oliva Street was already a central street in the city.

In the 1940s, the street became the main promenade for the youth of Pontevedra. In the 1950s, the street underwent significant commercial development and presented a distinct urban image.

In 1961, the first section of the shopping arcades (galerías comerciales) on Oliva Street was inaugurated and in 1965, a second section of the arcades was opened, linking Oliva Street to General Gutiérrez Mellado Street. These shopping arcades, designed by the architect Enrique Barreiro to bring together the different traders and to modernise and revitalise commerce, were of great importance at the time.

In 1981, Oliva Street underwent its most complete renovation and, on 23 December, it became the first pedestrianised street in the city centre.

In 2001, the pedestrian section of the street was again renovated and in 2002, an olive tree like the one that gave the street its name was placed in front of the central post office building.

In 2018, with the opening of a 1700 square metre Gadis supermarket at number 27 of the street where Concepción Arenal lived, the traditional façade of the building has been recovered.

== Description ==
It is a street located in the heart of the city centre, which has a straight course of 175 metres and is essentially flat. Its average width is 8 metres.

It is a central street of the first urban expansion of the city, pedestrianised between the Peregrina square, at the edge of the historic centre of Pontevedra, and García Camba street, with a single lane of traffic and two pavements from García Camba street to St. Joseph square.

Several streets converge on it, from north to south: Galerías de la Oliva, García Camba and Marquis of Riestra. It is one of the main streets in the city centre, with many shops.

== Outstanding buildings ==
One of the ends of Oliva Street coincides with Saint Joseph's Square and, at the corner between the square and the street, there are the remains of the Baroque pazo of the Gago de Mendoza and Montenegro families, which currently has two floors. Its pointed battlements stand out in the upper part, decorated in the centre with six-pointed stars inscribed in a circle.

In the middle of Oliva street, on the corner of García Camba Street, is the central building of the city's post office, the headquarters of the Pontevedra provincial post office. The building belongs to the Art Nouveau style that prevailed in the early years of the 20th century. The main entrance is in the form of a chamfered corner with arches supported by classical columns and stone stairs leading to a raised entrance hall. It is decorated with geometric stonework on the façade, particularly on the upper level, with dormers and geometric windows on each level. The upper level, above the main entrance, is crowned by the stone coat of arms of the city. Inside, the building is built around a central space above a public hall, and the use of materials such as glass, wood and plaster, as well as the coloured glass vault, are particularly noteworthy.

In the street there are several stone houses from the end of the 19th century, such as the one at number 33, with a ground floor for commercial use and one or two floors for residential use, the first with balconies and the second with galleries, a pattern that was repeated in the 19th century in the streets of the city's first urban expansion zone.

At number 30 Oliva Street, on the corner of Marqués de Riestra Street, there is a rationalist building by the architect Emilio Salgado Urtiaga.

== Gallery ==
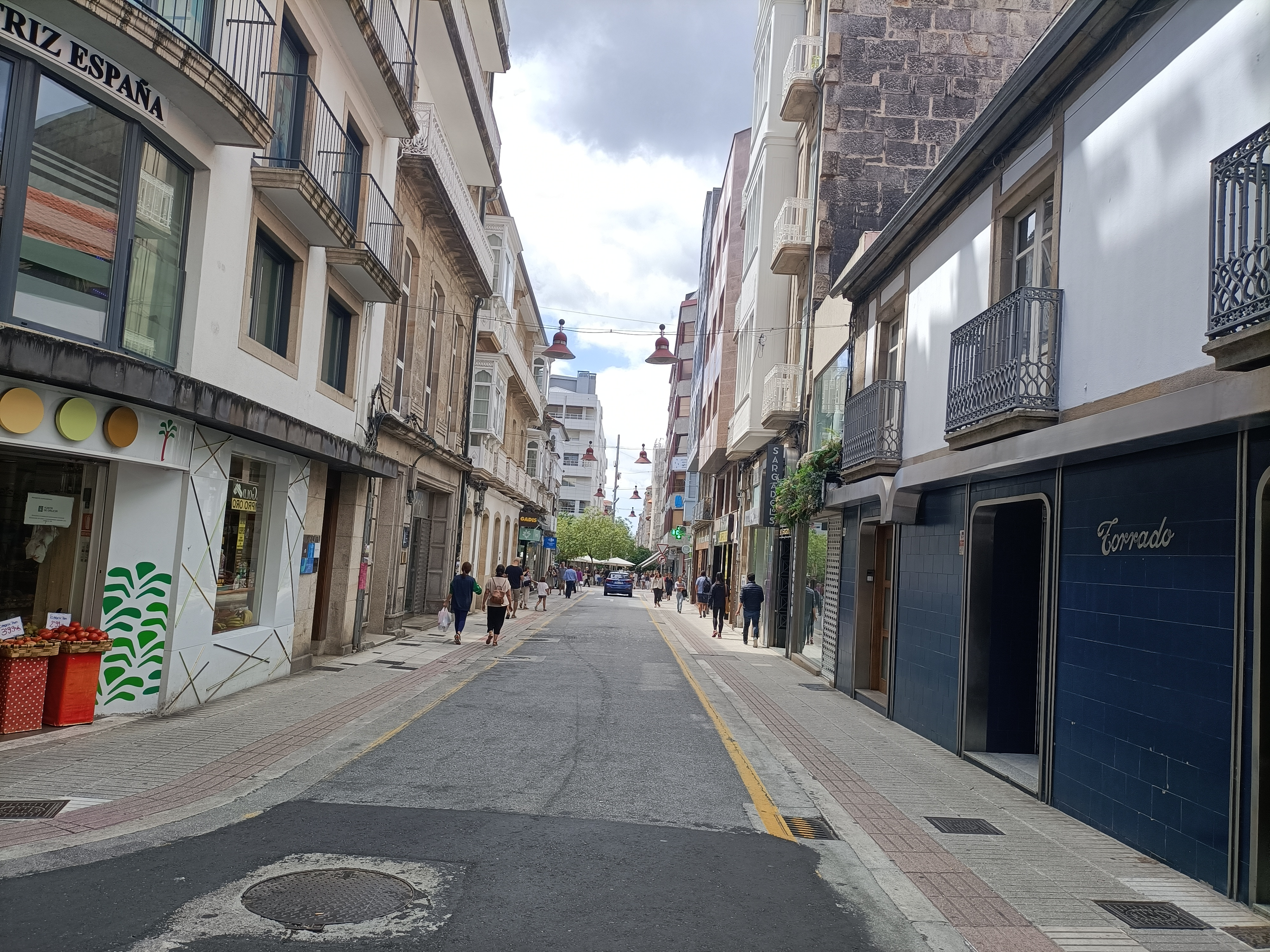
Oliva Street in 2023

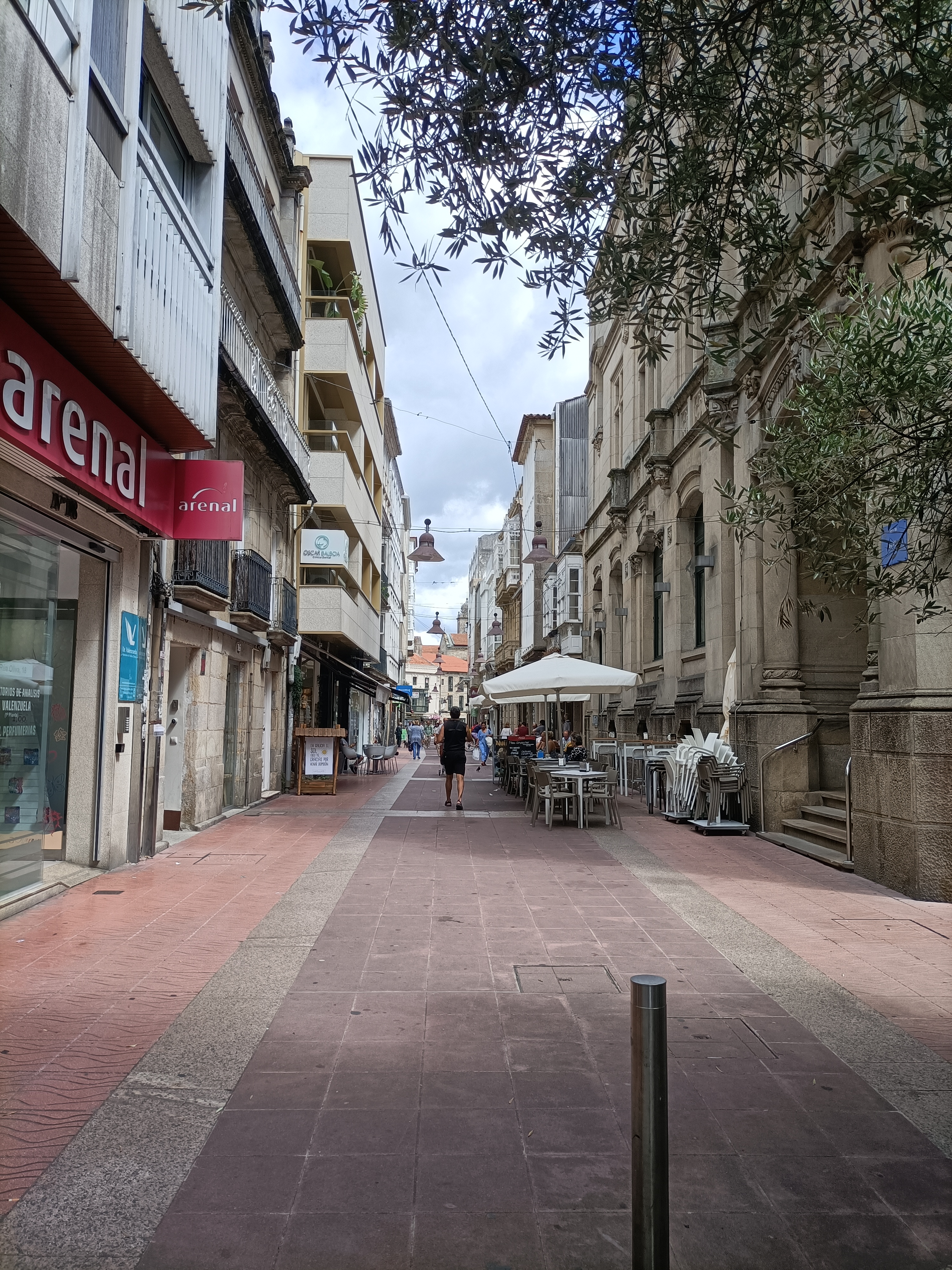
Pedestrianised stretch of Oliva Street

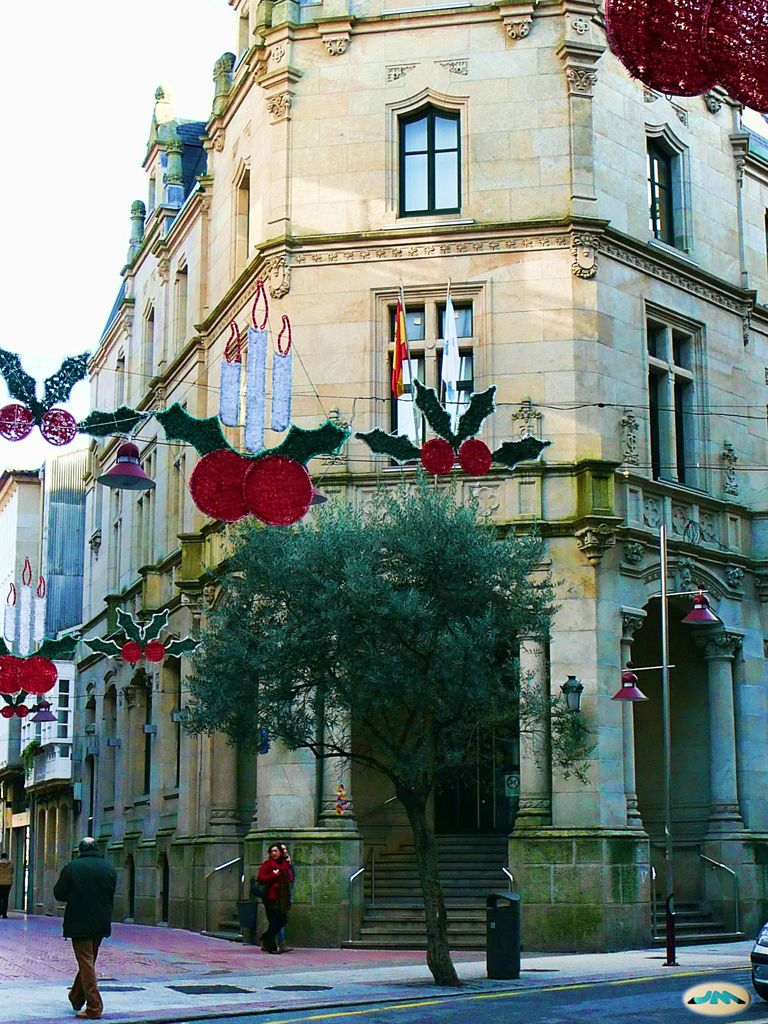
Olive tree in Oliva Street.

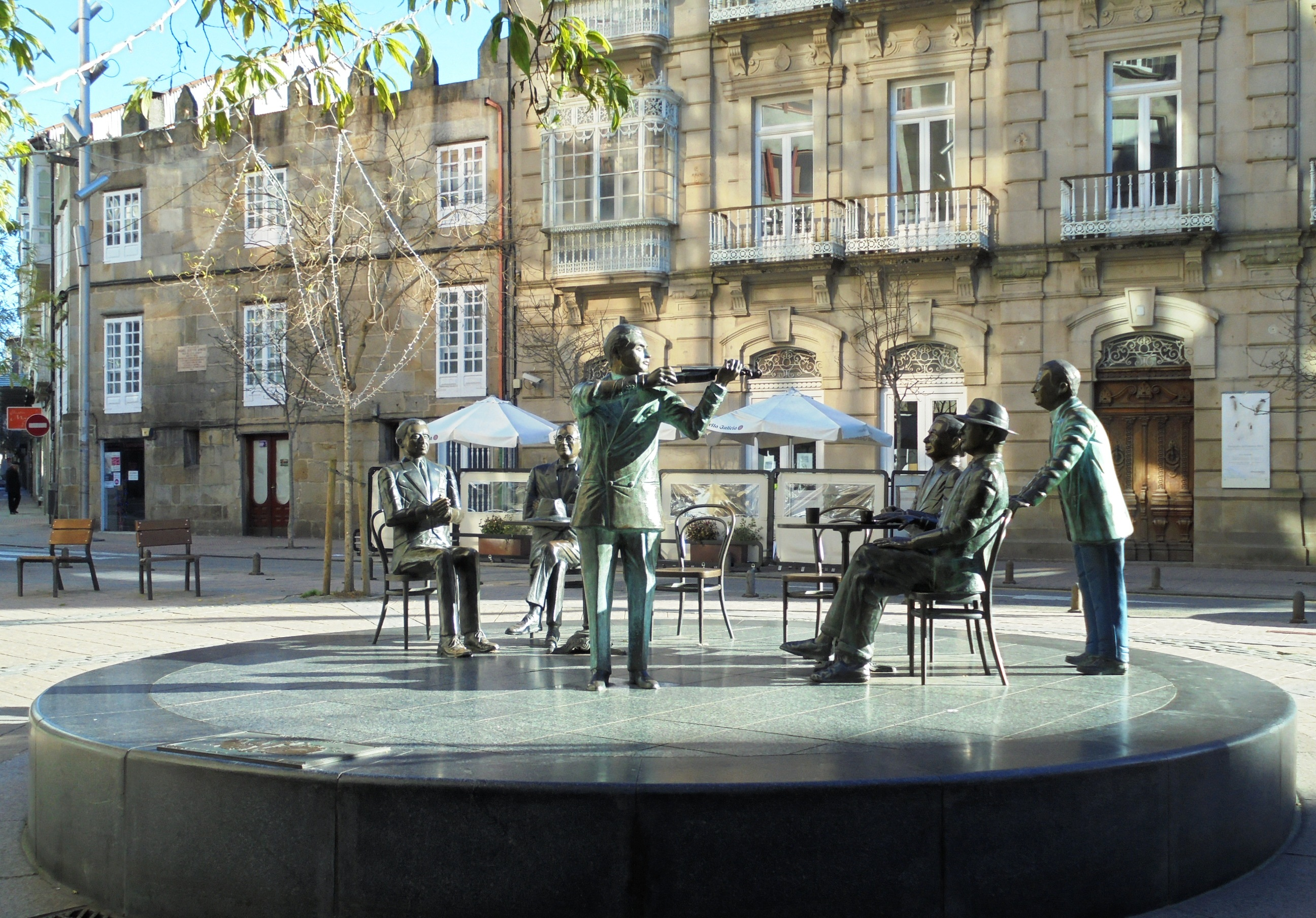
Remains of the crenellated pazo of the Gago de Mendoza family in the background, on the left, at the corner of Oliva Street.

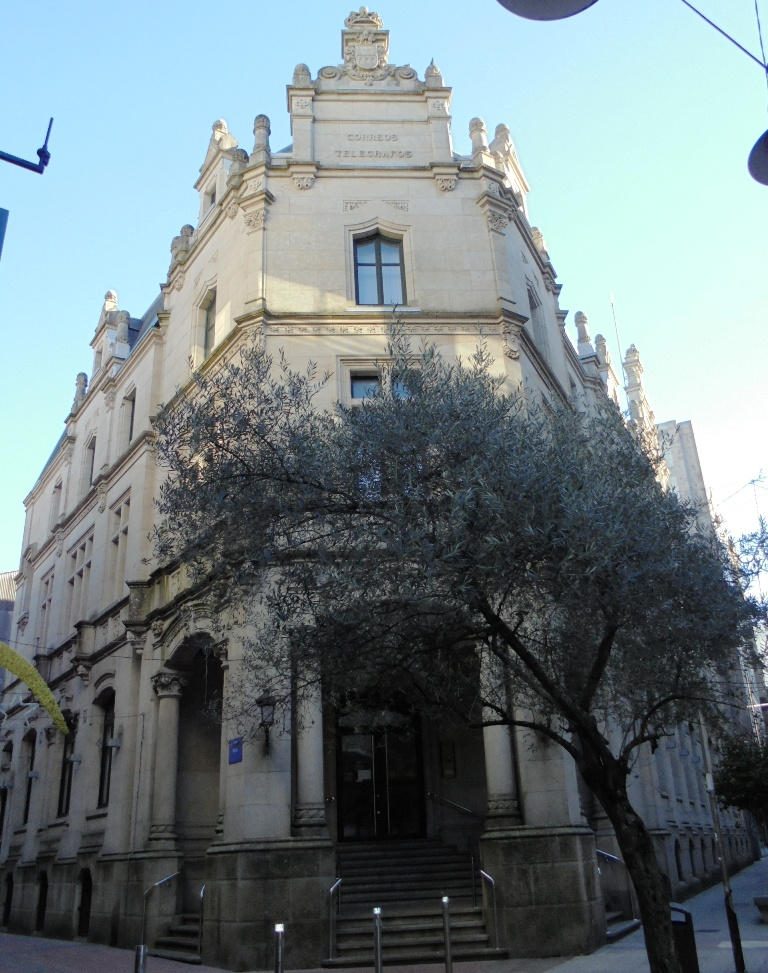
Central post office in the street with the olive tree in front of the building.

== See also ==
=== Bibliography ===
- Durán Villa, Francisco (2000). Provincia de Pontevedra (in Spanish). Madrid: Mediterráneo. p. 90. ISBN 8471563371.
- Fontoira Surís, Rafael (2009). Pontevedra monumental (in Galician). Pontevedra: Diputación de Pontevedra. p. 342;431;445–446. ISBN 9788484573272.
- Fortes Bouzán, Xosé (2011). Pontevedra. Burgo, villa, capital (in Spanish). Brión-A Coruña: Guiverny. p. 386. ISBN 978-84-939449-1-9.

=== Related articles ===
- Ensanche-City Centre
- Peregrina Square
- Pontevedra Central Post Office
- Saint Joseph Square
- García Camba Street

=== External links ===
- Oliva Street
