= Mollavao (Pontevedra) =

Neighbourhood in Pontevedra, Spain

- Neighbourhood of Pontevedra
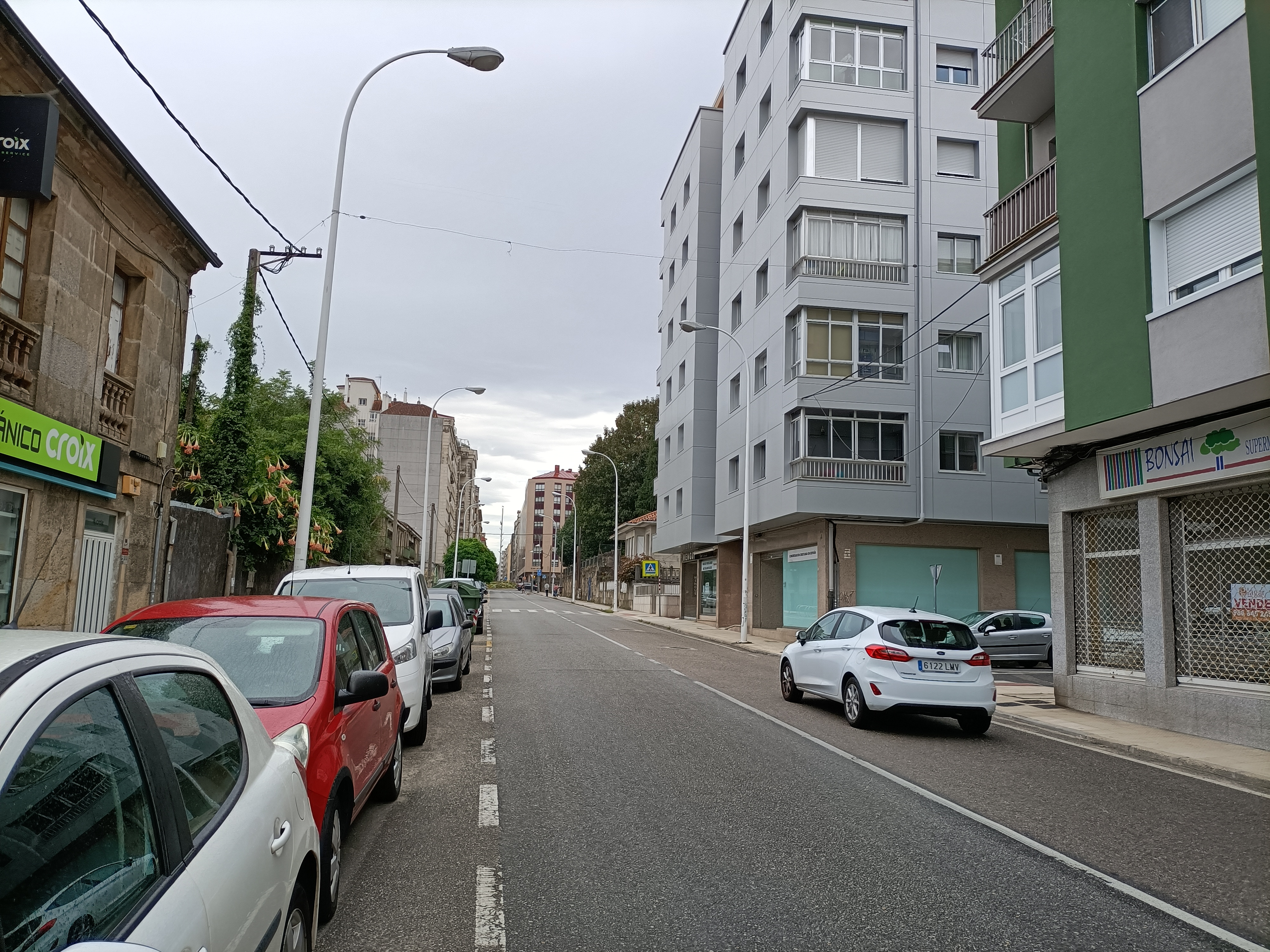
- Rosalía de Castro Street in Mollavao
- Interactive map of Mollavao
- Coordinates: 42°25′27″N 8°39′14″W
- Country: Spain
- City: Pontevedra
- Postal code: 36003

Mollavao is a neighborhood in the city of Pontevedra, Spain, located in its southwestern area, next to the Ria de Pontevedra. It primarily serves a residential function.

== Location ==
The Mollavao neighbourhood is located in the southwest of the city of Pontevedra. It is bounded to the northwest by Marín Avenue and the Pontevedra seafront, to the north by Manuel del Palacio Street, to the west by Estrigueiras Street and the AP-9 and to the south by Mollavao Street.

The neighbourhood is divided longitudinally in the centre by Rosalía de Castro Street and its extension towards Marín, the PO-546 road.

== History ==
The ancient sandy cove where Mollavao is located is the origin of the present-day neighbourhood. The name Mollavao comes from molle (wharf) and vao (place of unloading). Mollavao originated as a port area in the Roman Empire, serving as the outport of Pontevedra. The first known mention, as Mollia Vada, is from a document of 1220. In 1595, it was already described in a plan kept in the General Archives of Simancas as a remarkable place in the ria of Pontevedra.

In the first half of the 18th century, the Chapel of the Saints was built in the Baroque style in Mollavao. Its construction was ordered in 1737 by Juan De Marzoa to be dedicated to Saint Francis (whose stone statue was in a niche on the façade) and was completed in 1741. It was a baroque temple of Portuguese inspiration, surrounded by columns crowned with statues of saints (St. James, St. Joseph, St. John, St. Peter, St. Michael, St. Anthony, St. Martin, St. Lupus, the Virgin Mary and the Guardian angel). In the mid-19th century, it was abandoned and its architectural elements and statues were moved to other locations, including the cemeteries of Salcedo and Saint Maurus and the chapel of Saint Blaise.

In the mid-19th century, the overall connections between the city and other towns were improved and between 1847 and 1851, Oliva Street and the current Rosalía de Castro Street were built, the extension of which as a road connected the city to Marín through Mollavao.

The Fabril Gallega de Jabones soap factory was set up in the Mollavao neighbourhood in 1938, at the current number 126 Rosalía de Castro Street. The building was designed by the municipal architect Emilio Quiroga Losada and remained in business until 1944, when its owner died. It produced everything from laundry products to bath and toilet soaps. Among the most famous were the San Justo salt soaps.

In 1944, land was expropriated in the area for the construction of housing for naval officers working at the Naval Military Academy. In Mollavao, on both sides of Rosalía de Castro Street, houses were built for this purpose, surrounded by green areas and gardens.

On 19 May 1947, the project to build a road along the Pontevedra ria between Pontevedra and the Placeres neighbourhood, in the civil parish of Lourizán, was approved. The work on this road, which began in 1949 and was completed in 1955, also modified the Mollavao creek, filling it completely with earth. In 1969, the road was completed with four lanes of traffic and was opened as a four-lane road on 8 August 1969.

In 1948 the first tenants started to move into the social housing consisting of small colourful houses around Benito Vicetto Square.

In 1953, the Juan Sebastián Elcano private school (belonging to the Ministry of Defence) was built in the neighbourhood, in Rosalía de Castro Street, next to the Navy's military housing, which began operating in 1954.

On 26 September 1985, the Casa del Mar polyclinic health centre building was inaugurated in the Mollavao neighbourhood, with a total of 89 specialist doctors.

On 21 December 1989, construction began on the AP-9 motorway bridge, the Ria Bridge, and the route of the motorway through the south and west of the city, which crosses the Mollavao neighbourhood on a viaduct and was opened on 25 March 1992. This highway has completely changed the appearance of the area.

In the future, there are plans to build a wide street linking Rosalía de Castro Street to Marín Avenue on the former site of the circus in order to improve mobility in the area.

== Urban planning ==
The neighbourhood is a medium to low density residential area with some commercial establishments. It is centred around the central street Rosalía de Castro and the PO-546 road that connects Pontevedra and Marín and passes by the Lourizán Palace, located 2.5 kilometres from the neighbourhood. On its southwestern side, the neighbourhood borders the Pontevedra ria and the Pontevedra seafront, which has a lookout point over the ria.

Mollavao is delimited in the part closest to the city centre, in Rosalía de Castro Street, by the houses built in the mid-20th century for naval officers and by buildings of different heights, and in the area around the PO-546 road by the presence of scattered houses.

The area has a children's playground under the AP-9 motorway overpass and a traffic education park. The Fonte Santa playground is also located in Mollavao.

== Facilities ==
=== Health centres ===
The main health centre in the neighbourhood is the "Casa del Mar" polyclinic health centre, which is part of the University Hospital Complex of Pontevedra and is a medical centre of reference for many of the inhabitants of Pontevedra.

=== Schools ===
Mollavao is home to the Juan Sebastián Elcano private school, which belongs to the Ministry of Defence.

=== Sports and leisure ===
- Under the AP-9 motorway bridge is the Pontevedra City Council's traffic education park.
- Until October 2022, the cultural association and concert hall Liceo Mutante was located in the neighbourhood.

== Gallery ==
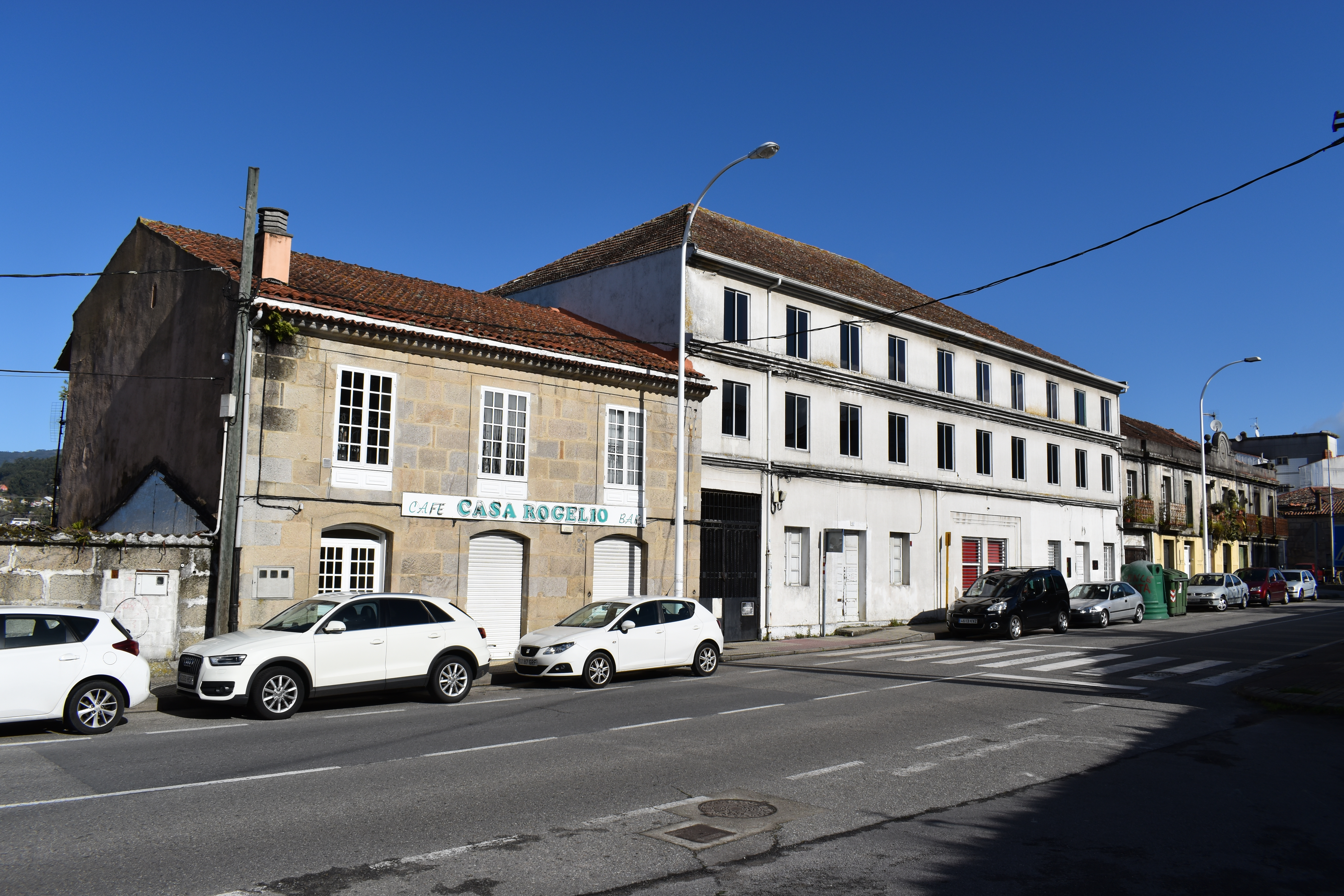
Rosalía de Castro Street

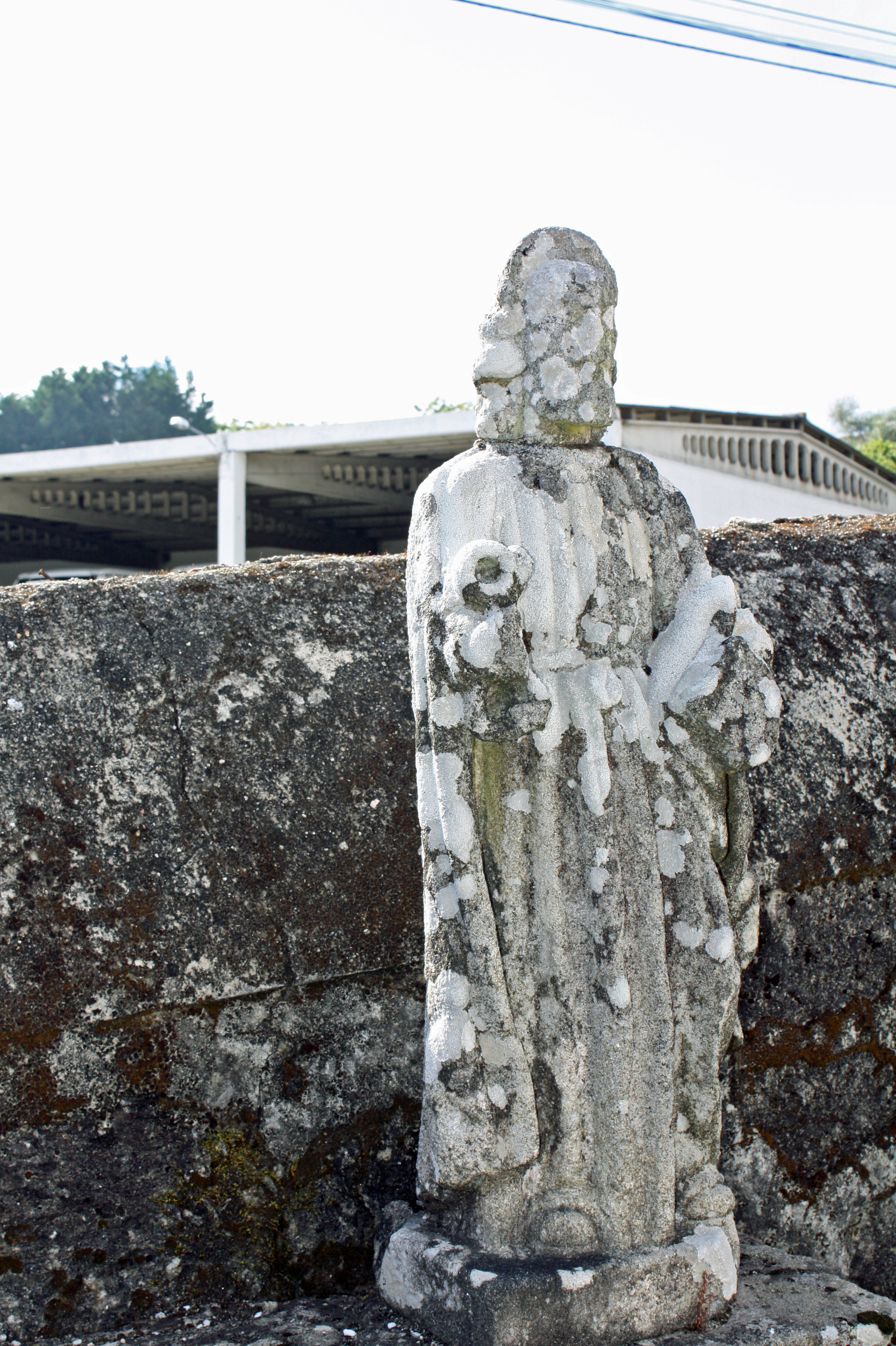
Statue of Saint Martin which was part of the old Saints' Chapel

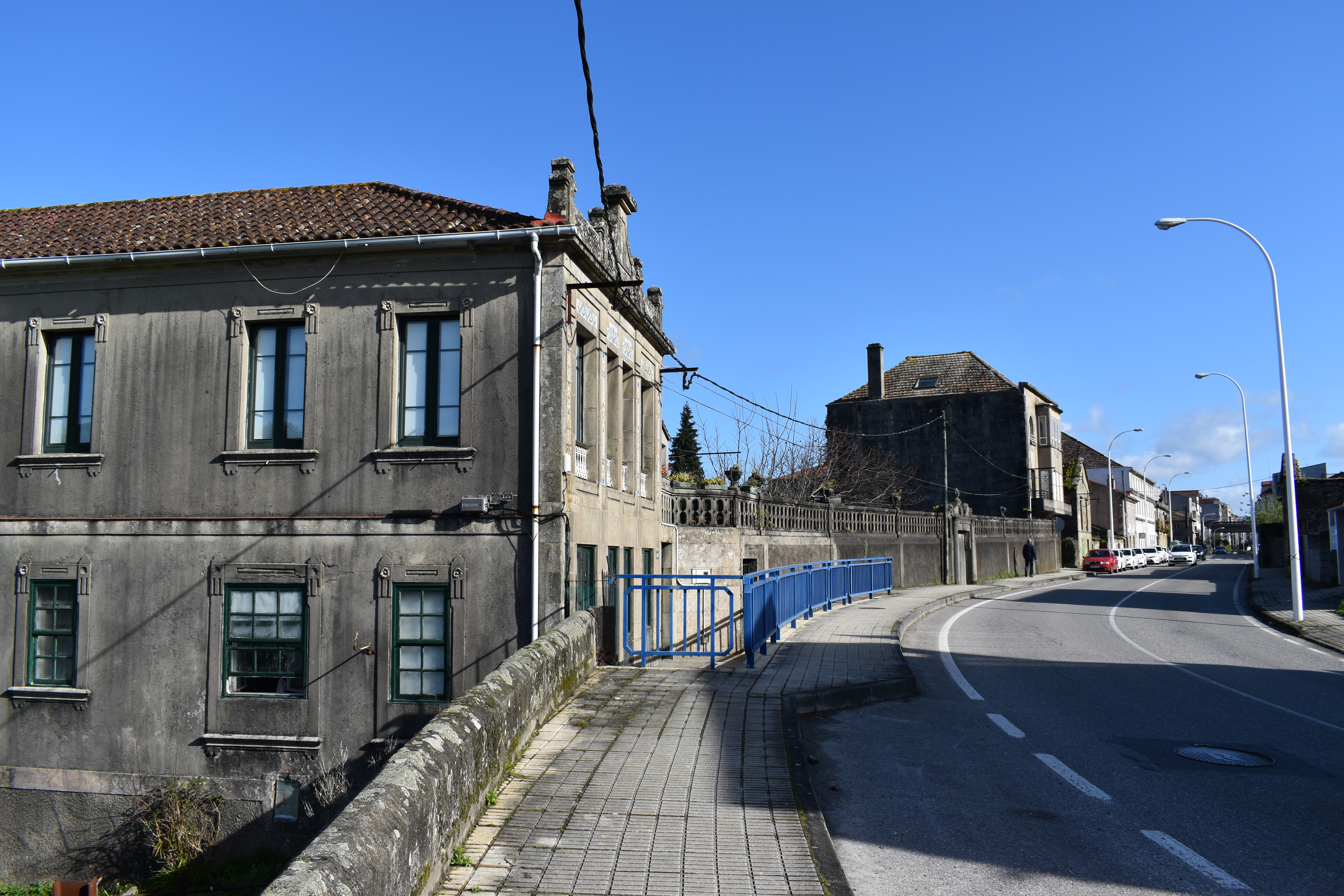
Road PO-546 through Mollavao

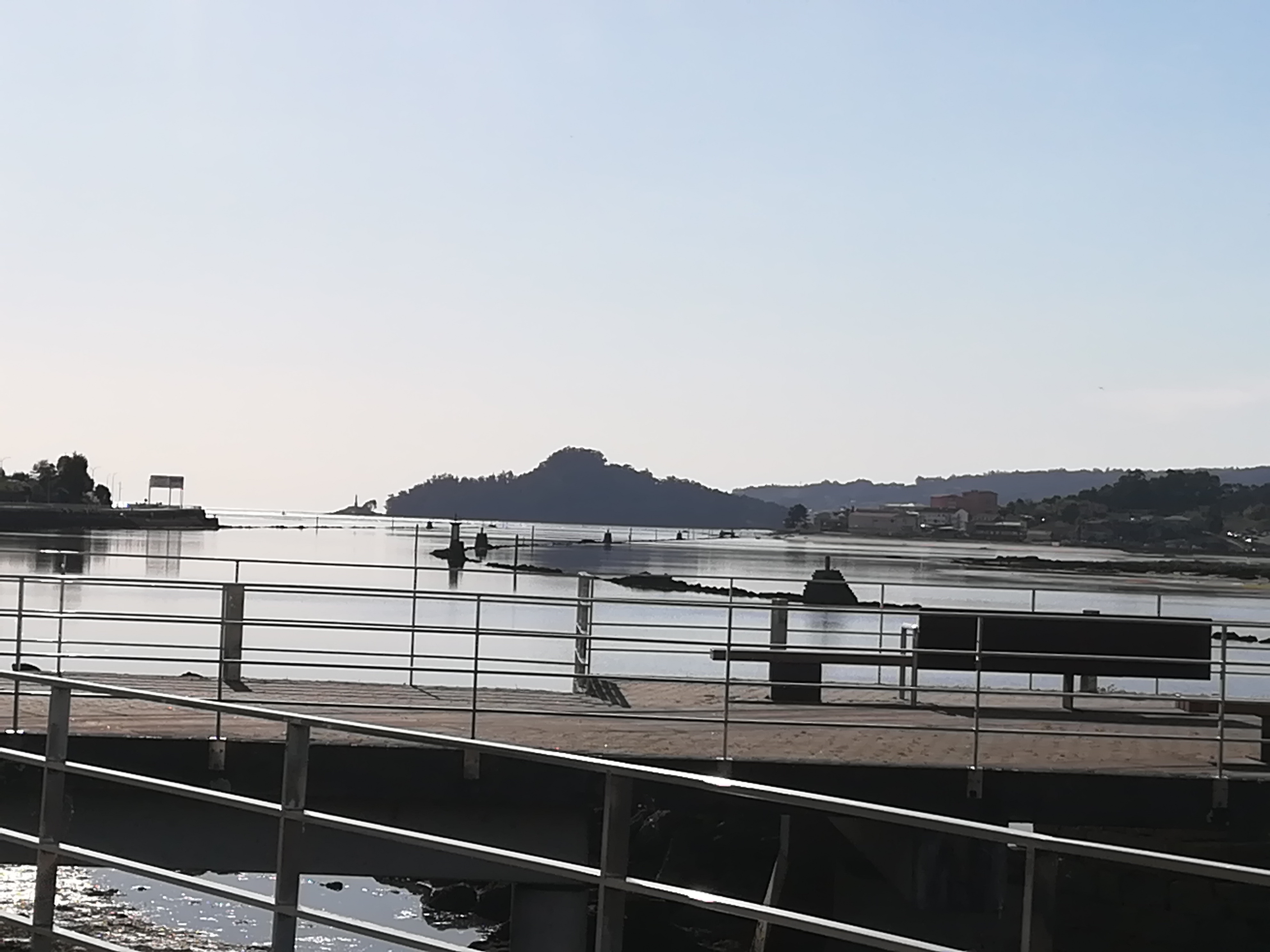
Viewpoint over the ria de Pontevedra

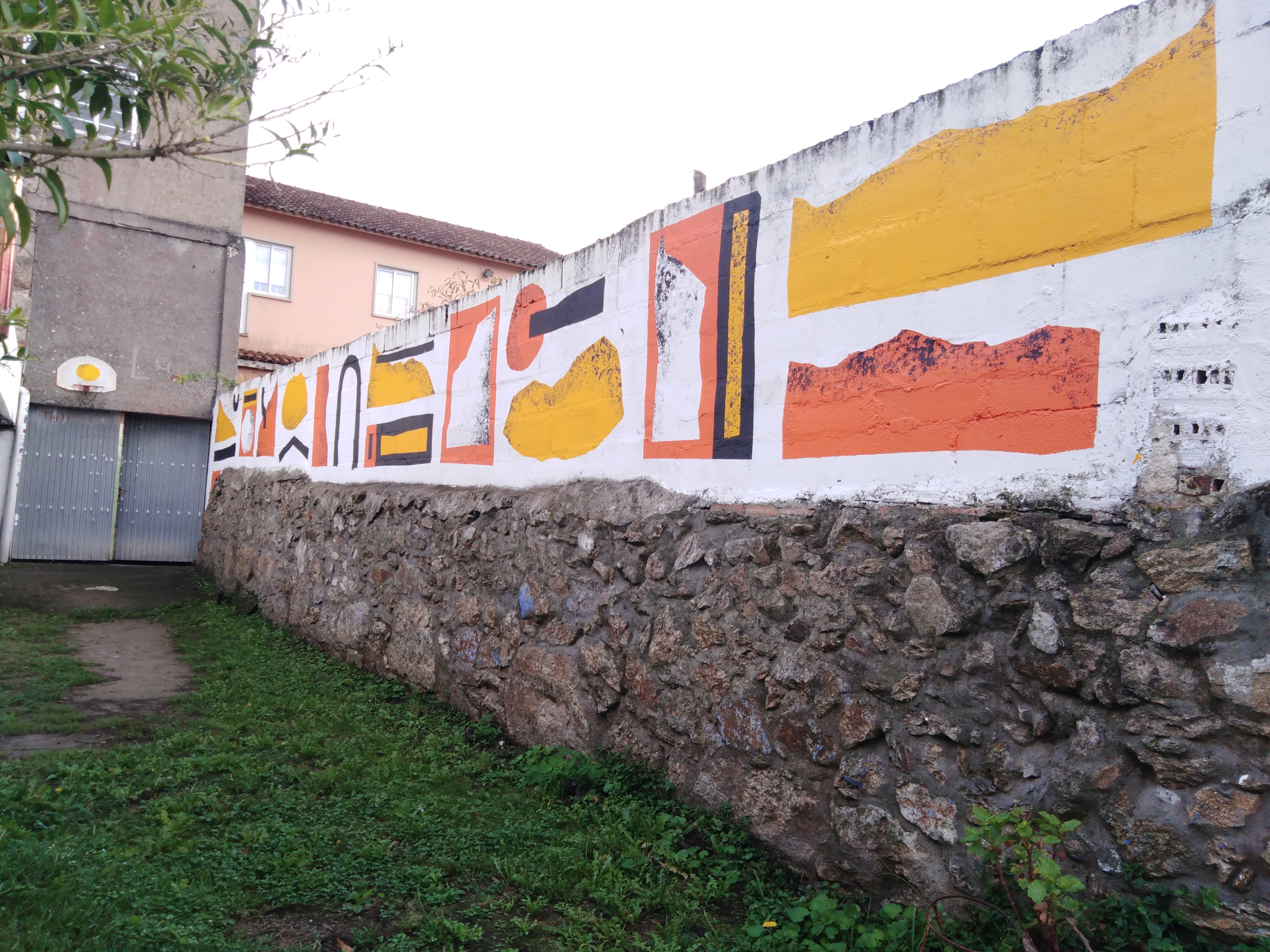
Liceo Mutante in Mollavao

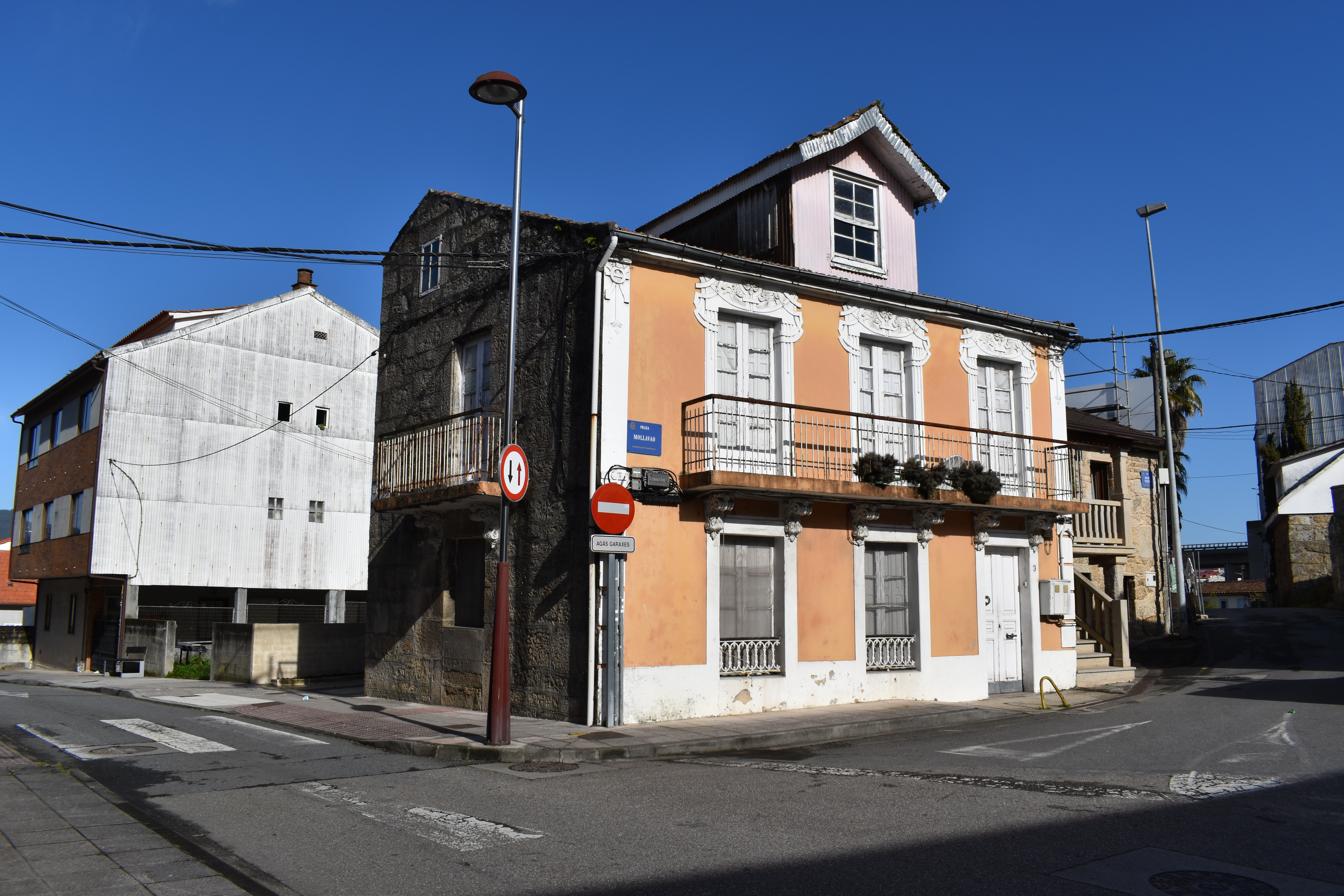
Mollavao Square

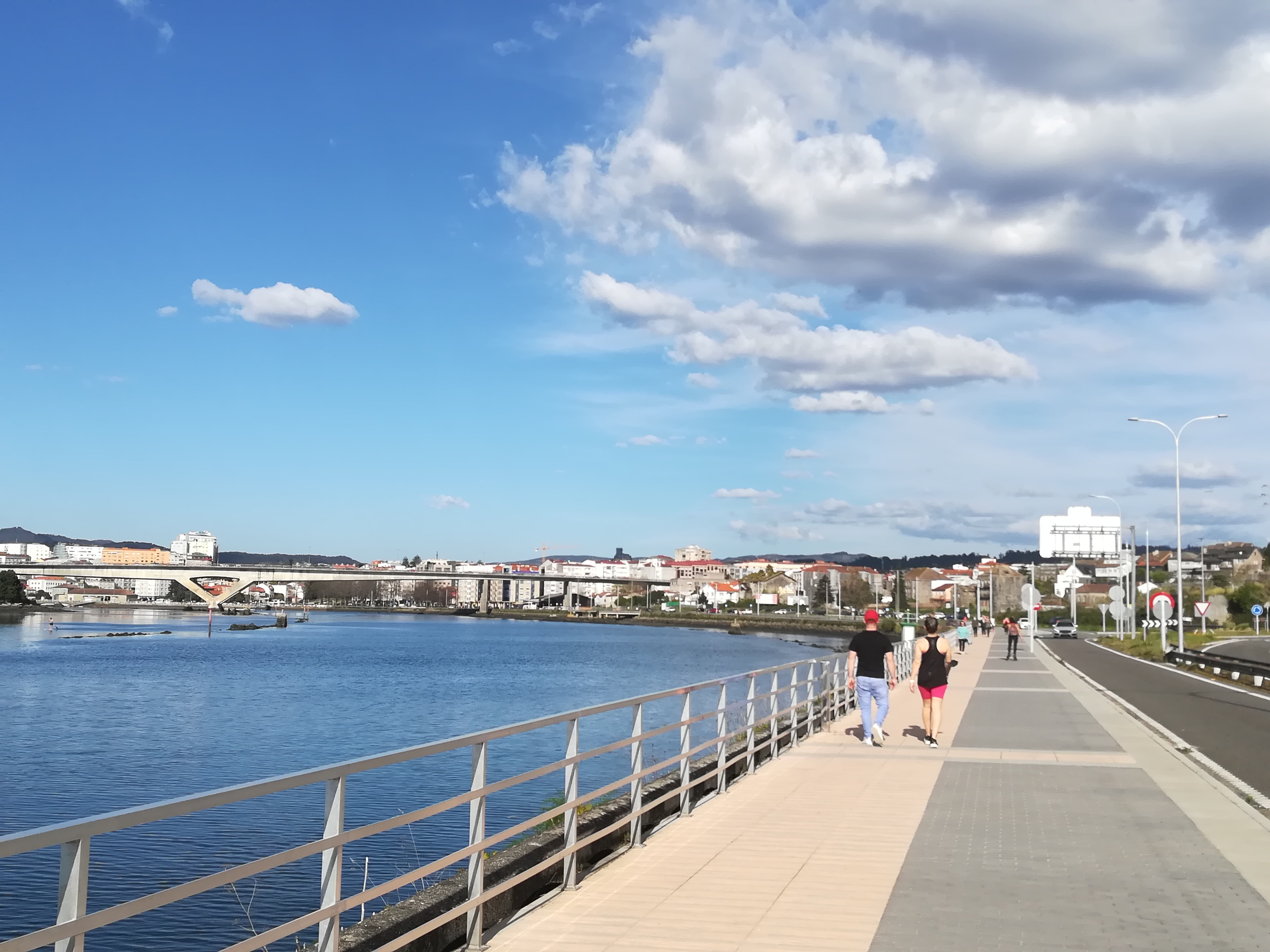
Pontevedra seafront, with Mollavao on the right

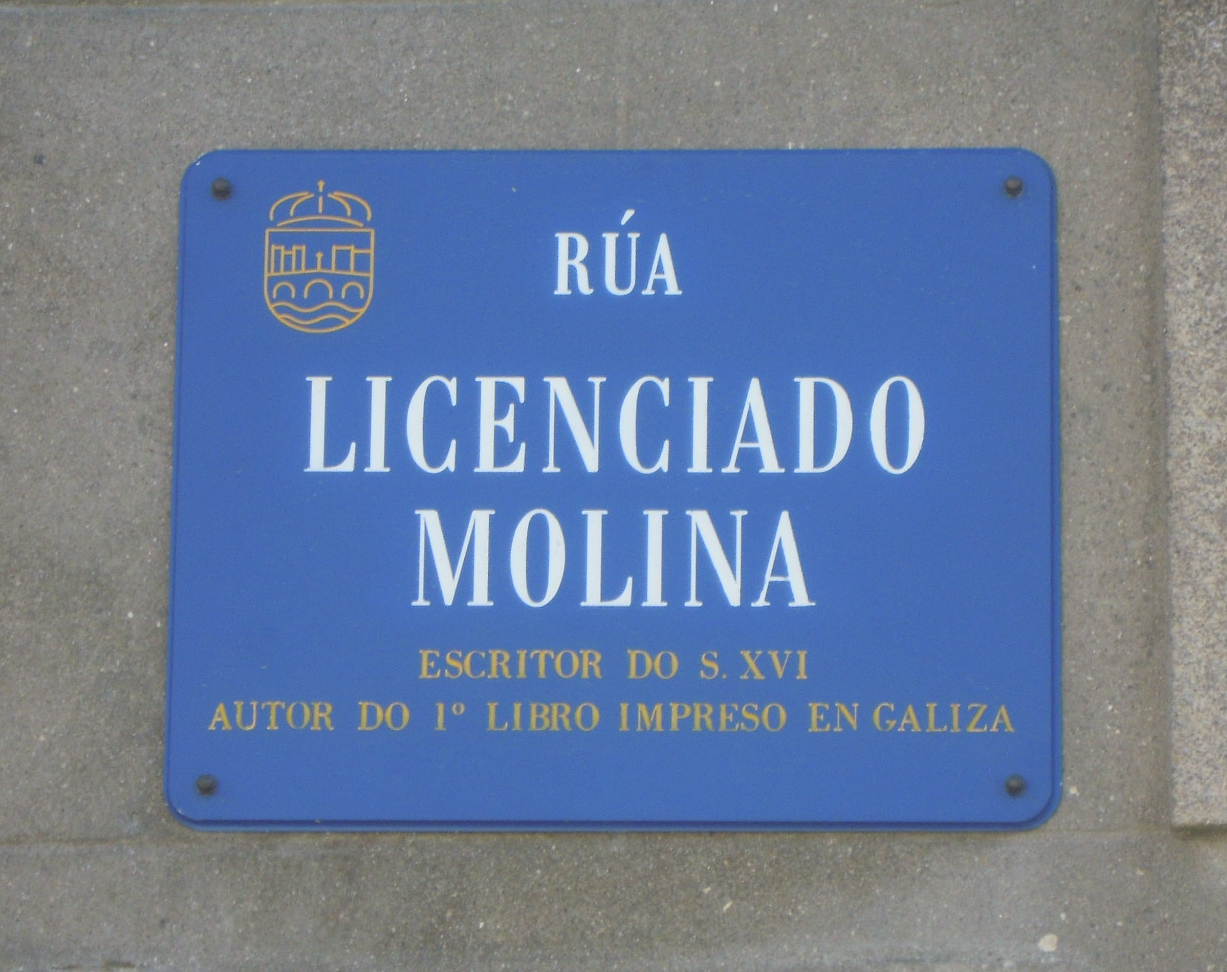
Licentiate Molina Street Plaque

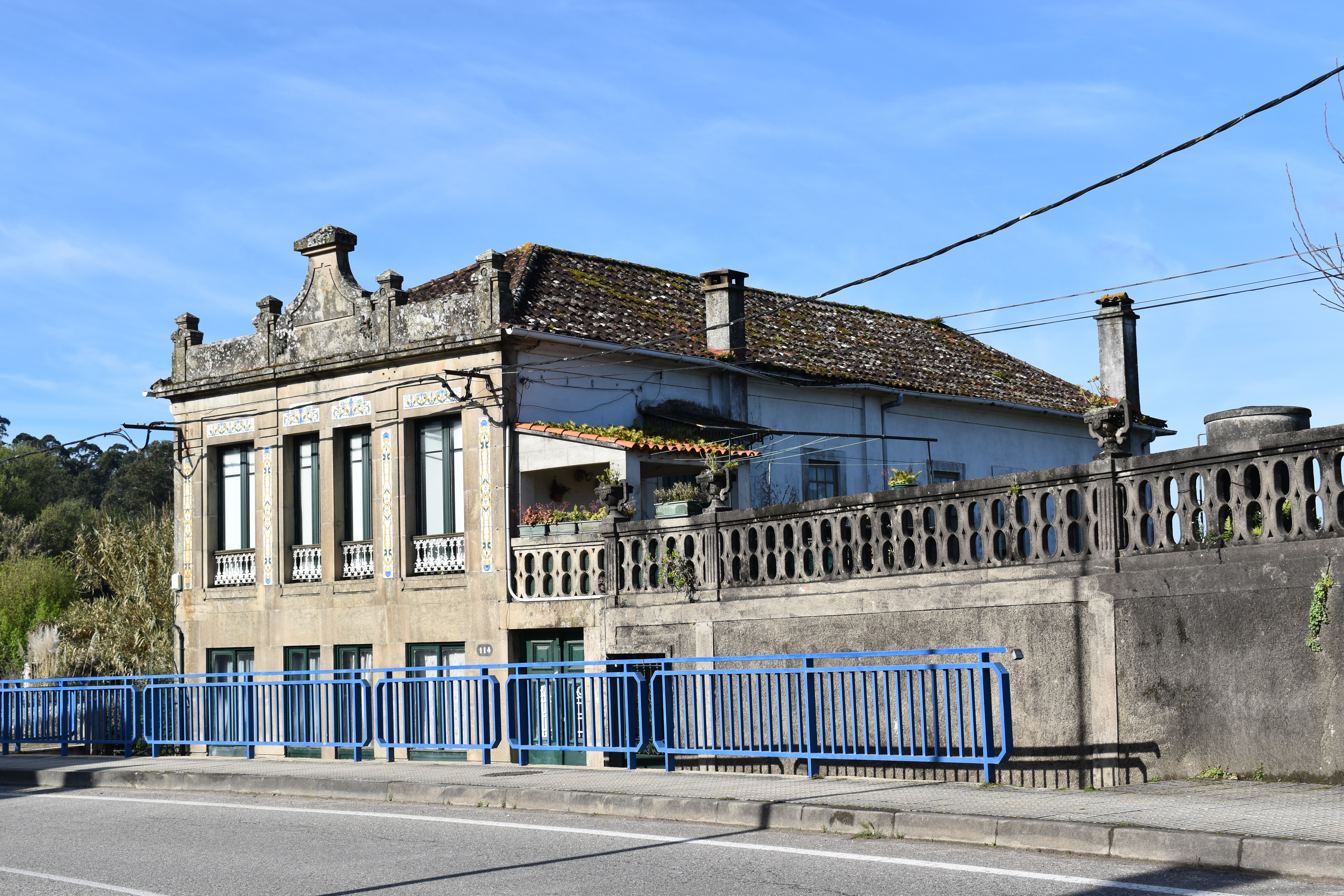
Villa Corona

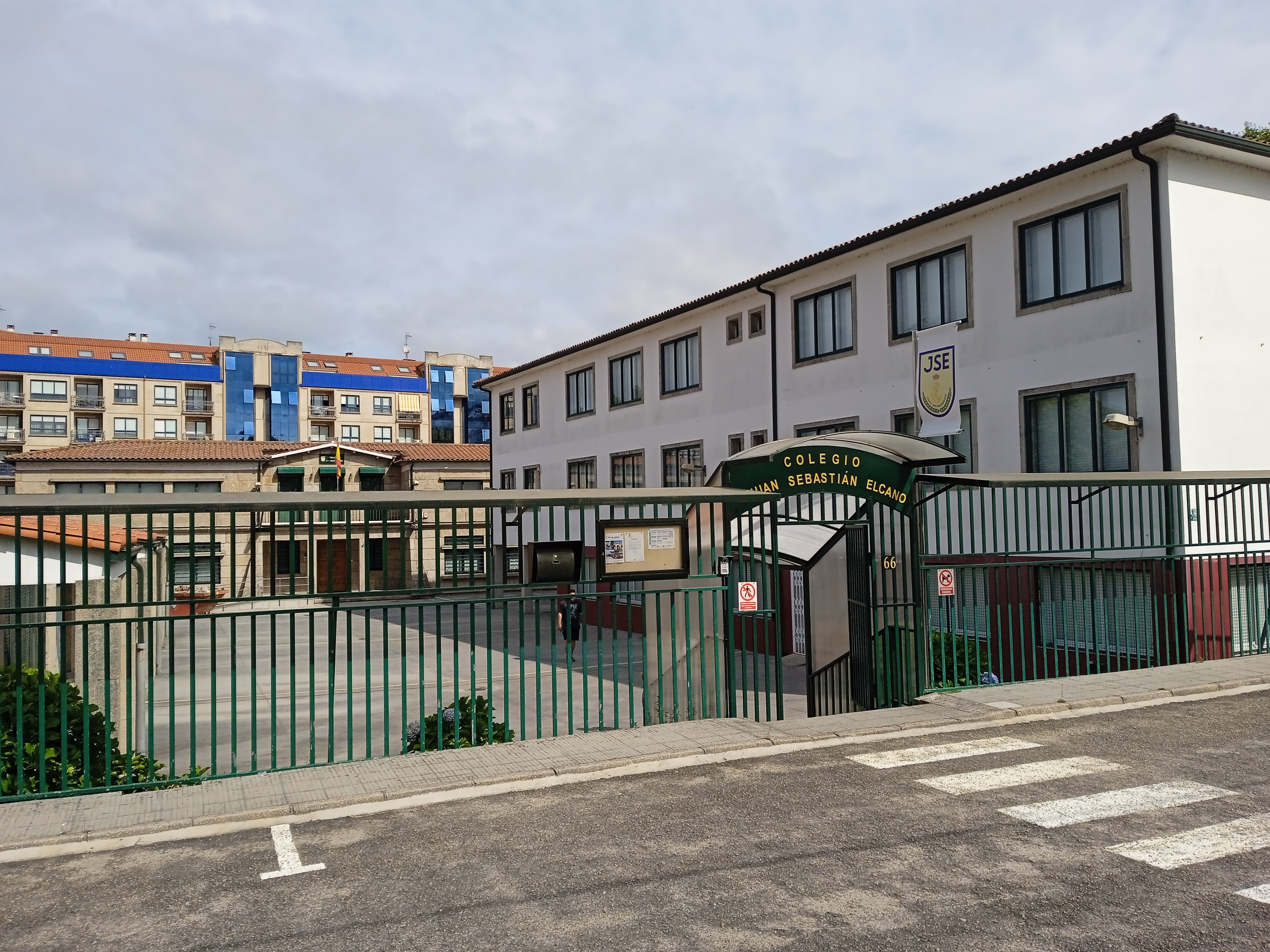
Juan Sebastián Elcano School

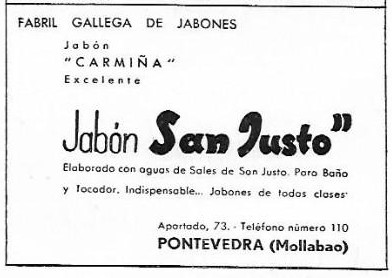
Advertising for San Justo soap (1939)

== See also ==
=== Bibliography ===
- Durán Villa, Francisco (2000). Provincia de Pontevedra (in Spanish). Madrid: Mediterráneo. p. 90. ISBN 8471563371.
- Sarmiento, Martín (1973). Catálogo de voces y frases de la lengua gallega (in Spanish). Salamanca: Universidad de Salamanca. p. 279. ISBN 84-600-5838-7.

=== Related articles ===
- Pontevedra seafront
- Campolongo

=== External links ===
- Mollavao creek
- Mollavao neighbourhood development project presented at the University of A Coruña
