= Glorieta de Compostela =

Square in Pontevedra, Spain

Glorieta de Compostela Square
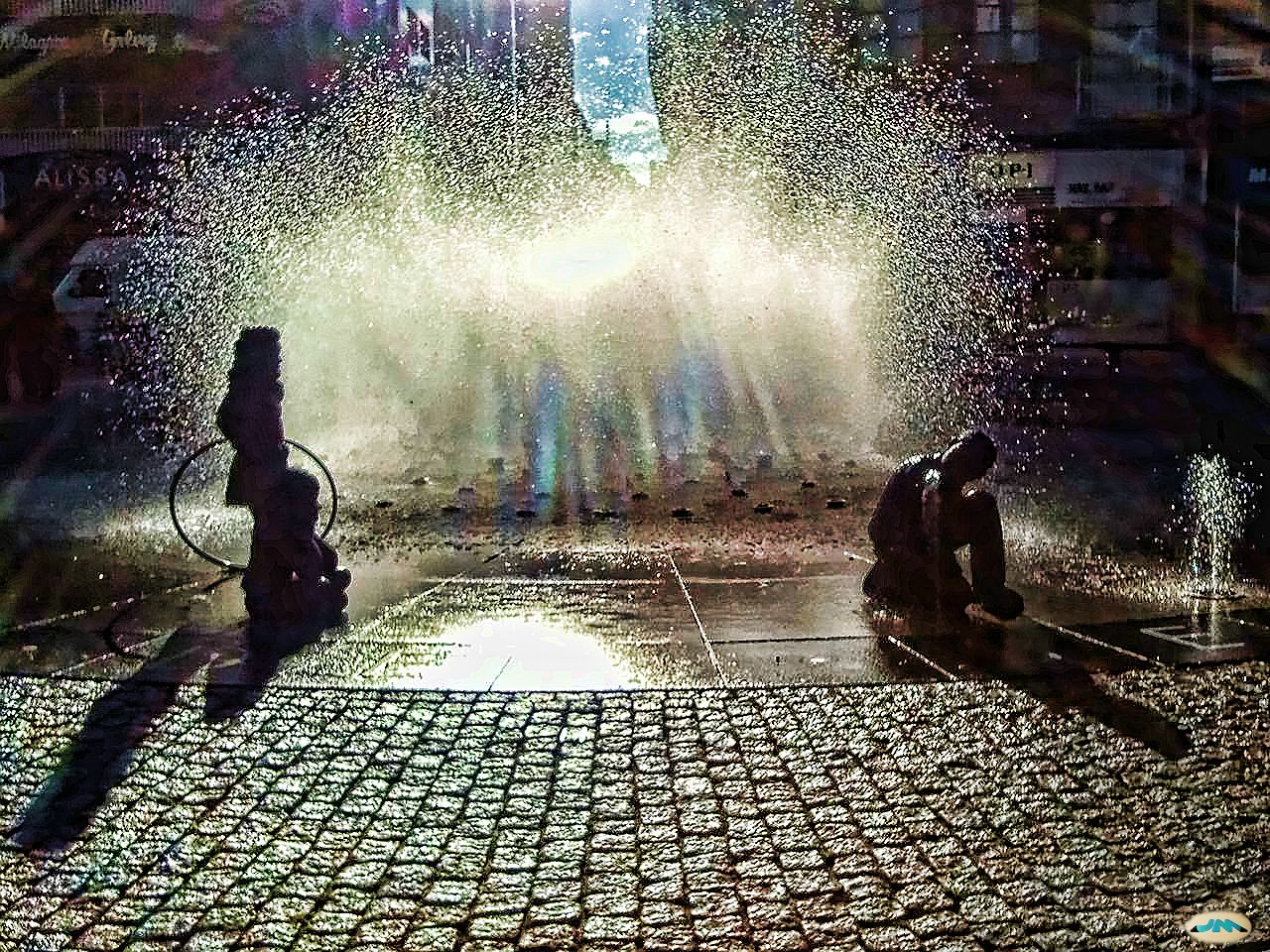
- The square with the fountain in the centre
- Native name: Glorieta de Compostela (Spanish)
- Type: plaza
- Maintained by: Pontevedra City Council
- Location: Pontevedra, Spain
- Postal code: 36001
- Coordinates: 42.4293°N 8.6431°W

Construction
- Completion: 2002

Other
- Designer: Jesús Fole Osorio

The Glorieta de Compostela is a square in the Spanish city of Pontevedra, in the city centre, in the Ensanche.

== Origin of the name ==
The square was given its current name in 1950, as a tribute to the Portuguese Way, which runs through it. The Glorieta de Compostela is known to the people of Pontevedra as the "Plaza de los Niños" (Children's Square).

== History ==
This busy spot has been a place of passage since the dawn of time, as it was here that the ancient Roman road Via XIX of Antonine Itinerary was laid out. Later, in the Middle Ages, it became a crossing point on the Portuguese Way, which has been a witness to pilgrimages to Santiago de Compostela ever since. From the 14th century onwards, this site outside the city walls was bounded on its eastern side, where the last section of Fray Juan de Navarrete Street now stands, by the former chapel of Our Lady of the Way or Virgen del Camino, which was altered several times over the centuries until it was demolished and disappeared.

At the beginning of the 19th century, during the French occupation of the town, the Chapel of Our Lady of the Way was destroyed by fire and the theft of much of its contents. In 1856, according to the map of Pontevedra drawn up by engineer Lieutenant-Colonel Francisco Coello de Portugal y Quesada, the area where the square stands today was laid out as an enclosed semicircular square, with buildings surrounding it. This irregular semicircular shape, with the chapel on its eastern side, is also shown on the 1910 map of the Spanish Institute of Geography and Statistics.

In May 1936, the demolition of the Chapel of Our Lady of the Way by the Pontevedra City Council, due to its ruinous condition and the fact that it obstructed traffic on a very important public street, facilitated the subsequent urban development of the area where it stood. The square formed at this crossroads was crossed in the post-war period by the N-550 road, which gradually increased the flow of traffic. A four-pointed lamppost was placed in its centre as a distinctive feature, and it housed a taxi rank while leaving a small semi-circular space free of cars on its west side, which was used as a car park from the 1960s and where one of the city's French-designed cast-iron fountains from 1887, commissioned by architect Alejandro Sesmero, was later installed. This semi-circular space was separated from traffic in the 1980s by a low metal balustrade surrounding a small planted area and was used as a terrace for a nearby café.

The Gónviz cinema, one of the city's most central cinemas and a popular meeting point for many of Pontevedra's residents, opened in 1973 in the square's tallest building, 13 storeys high, and remained open until 2001.

At the end of 2001, a complete renovation of the square began, designed by the architect Jesús Fole Osorio, after which the Glorieta de Compostela became an almost entirely pedestrianised area. A fountain was installed at its centre, and the renovation was inaugurated on 9 August 2002. In 2019, the fountain was fitted with a multicoloured lighting system.

Since its renovation, the Glorieta de Compostela has become a meeting point for the people of Pontevedra.

== Description ==
The square is located at the heart of the urban and commercial centre of Pontevedra, where the streets Peregrina, which crosses it from north-west to south-east, and Fray Juan de Naverrete converge.

It is a semi-circular, semi-pedestrianised square, surrounded on its eastern side by a small traffic lane that channels the limited traffic from Peregrina and Fray Juan de Navarrete streets. It is surrounded by buildings of different styles, the oldest dating from 1928 and 1950 and more modern ones from 1970 to 1990. The most striking feature of the square is the fountain known as the Children's Fountain, in the centre. Public lighting in the square is provided by two lighting columns equipped with spotlights.

The Children's Fountain is a flat fountain twenty metres in diameter with seventy spouts, the central ones arranged in a column of powerful jets of water and the surrounding ones in a mist, alternating with points of light. A sensor automatically lowers the force and height of the water to prevent passers-by getting wet. The centre of the fountain is paved and its black granite perimeter bears the inscription from the popular Galician song "Pontevedra é boa vila, dá de beber a quen pasa. 2002" (Pontevedra is a good city, it gives water to passers-by). A remarkable feature of the fountain is the stone statuary group on its edge, made up of three figures, two girls and a boy, which highlights three jets of water from which he quenches his thirst. The figures are the work of Sebastián Casalderrey and Manuel Collazo Torres. The figure of the seated girl was installed after the monument was inaugurated on 22 October 2002. The statuary group is a representation of two girls playing while they wait for a boy to finish drinking from the fountain, one seated and the other standing with a metal hoop under her arm.

== Gallery ==
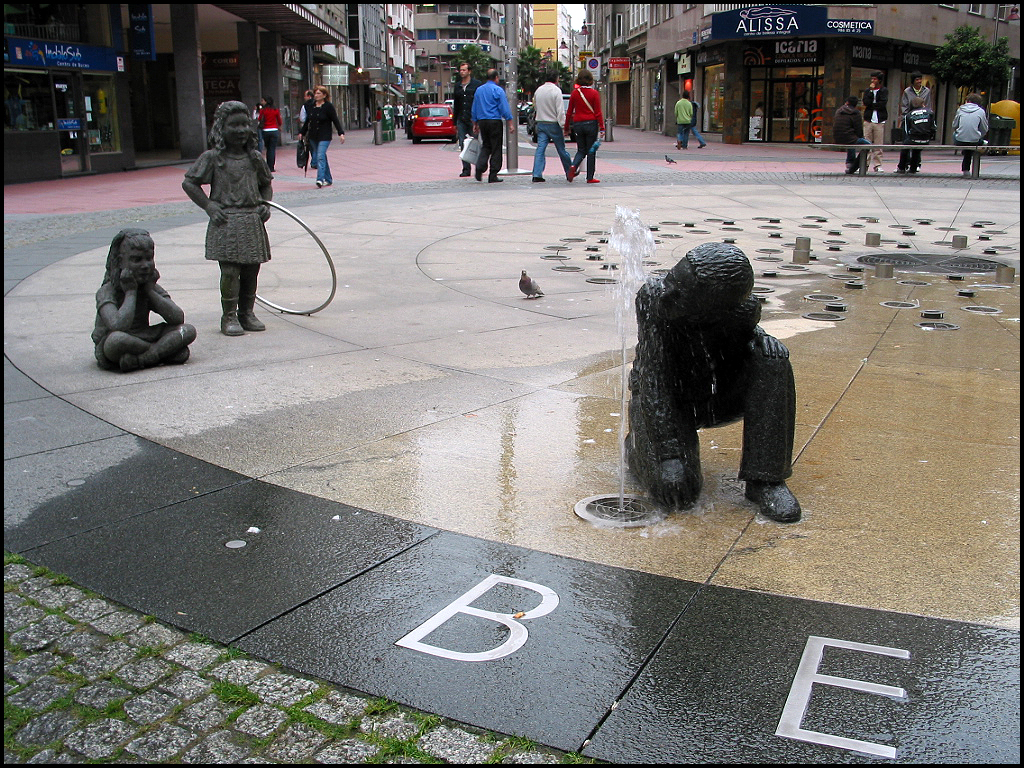
The statuary group of the Children's Fountain in the square

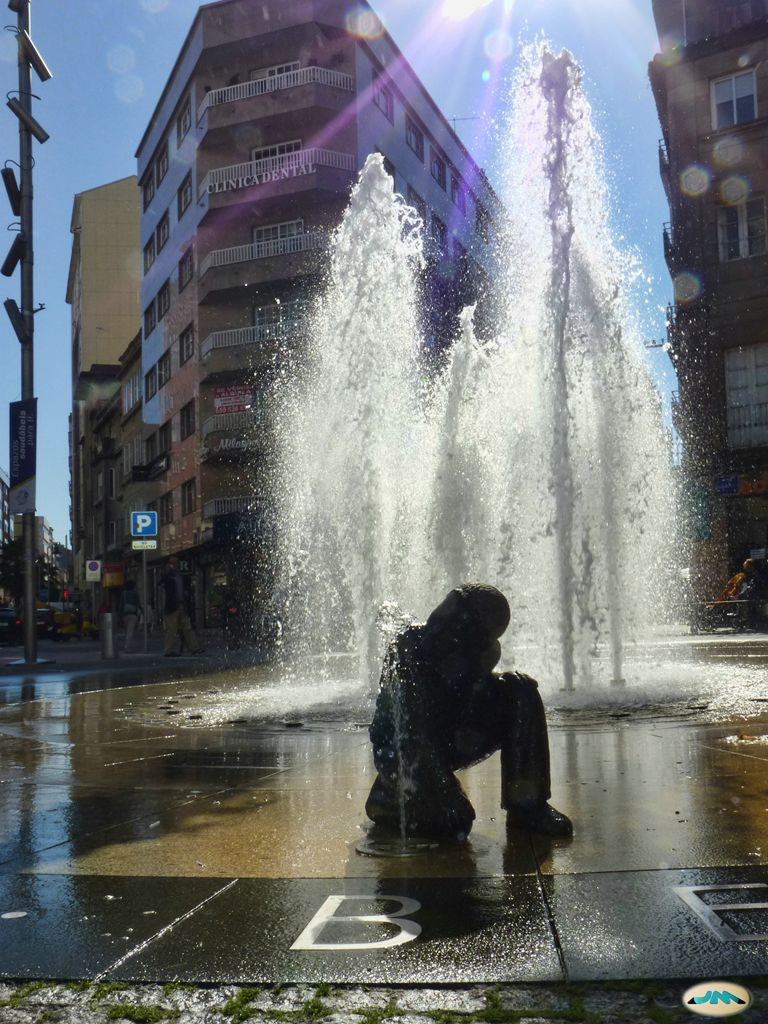
The Children's Fountain with the buildings of the square in the background

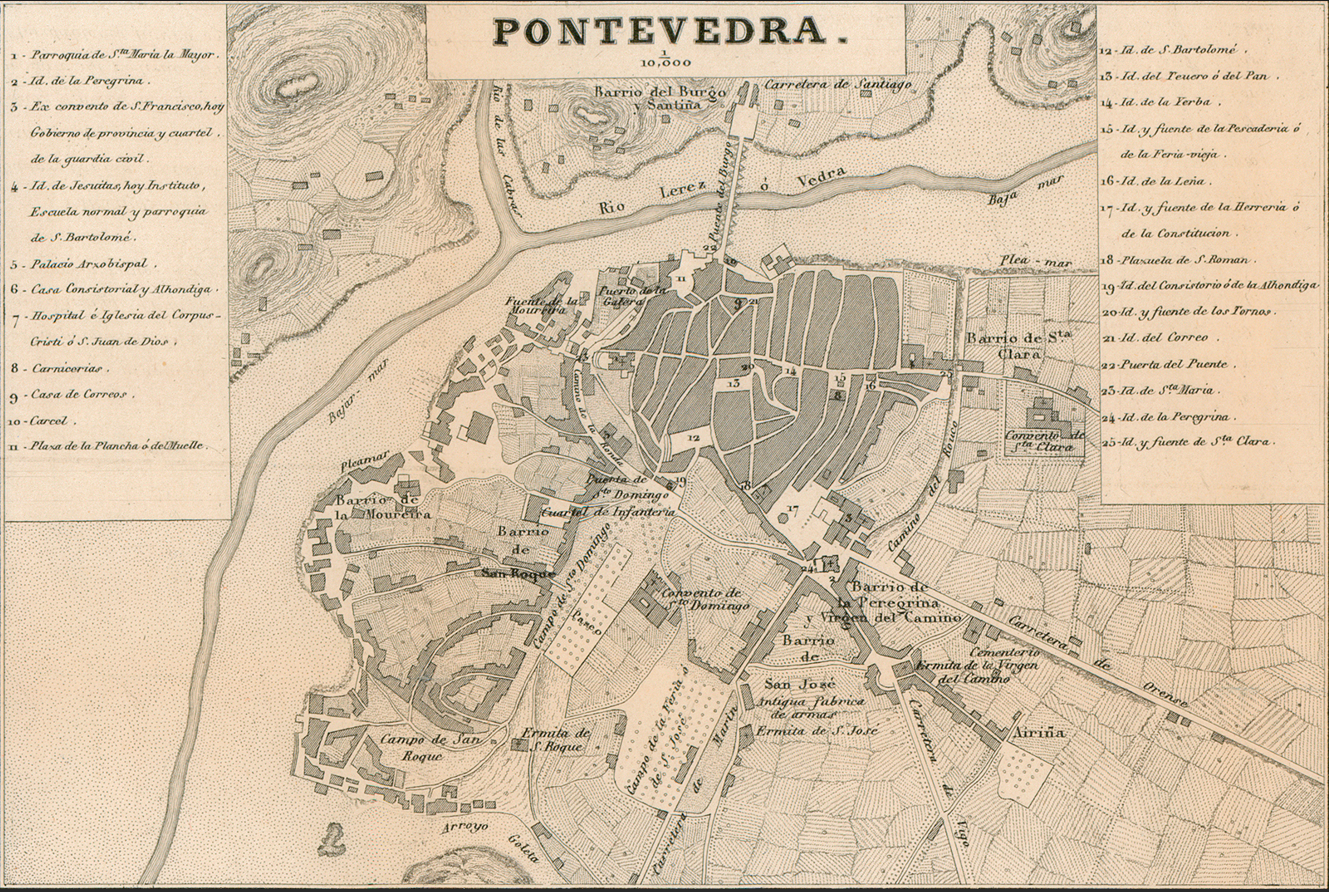
Plan of 1856 with the square to the left of the Hermitage of the Virgin of the Way

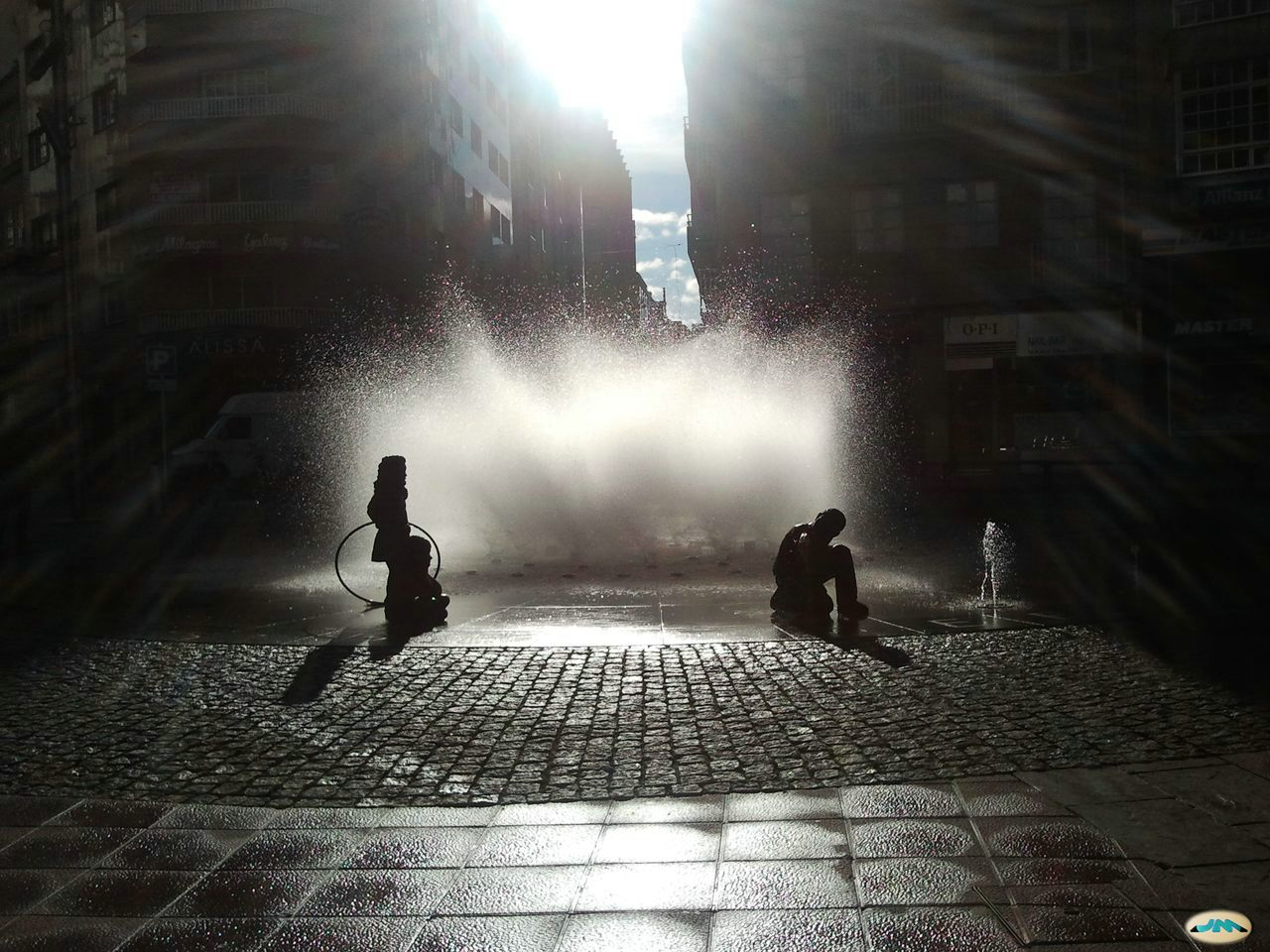
The fountain in the centre of the square

== See also ==
=== Bibliography ===
- Juega Puig, Juan (2000). As rúas de Pontevedra (in Galician). Pontevedra: Diputación de Pontevedra. p. 71. ISBN 84-8457-044-4.

=== Related articles ===
- Ensanche de Pontevedra
- García Camba Street
