= Calle García Camba =

Street in Pontevedra, Spain

García Camba Street
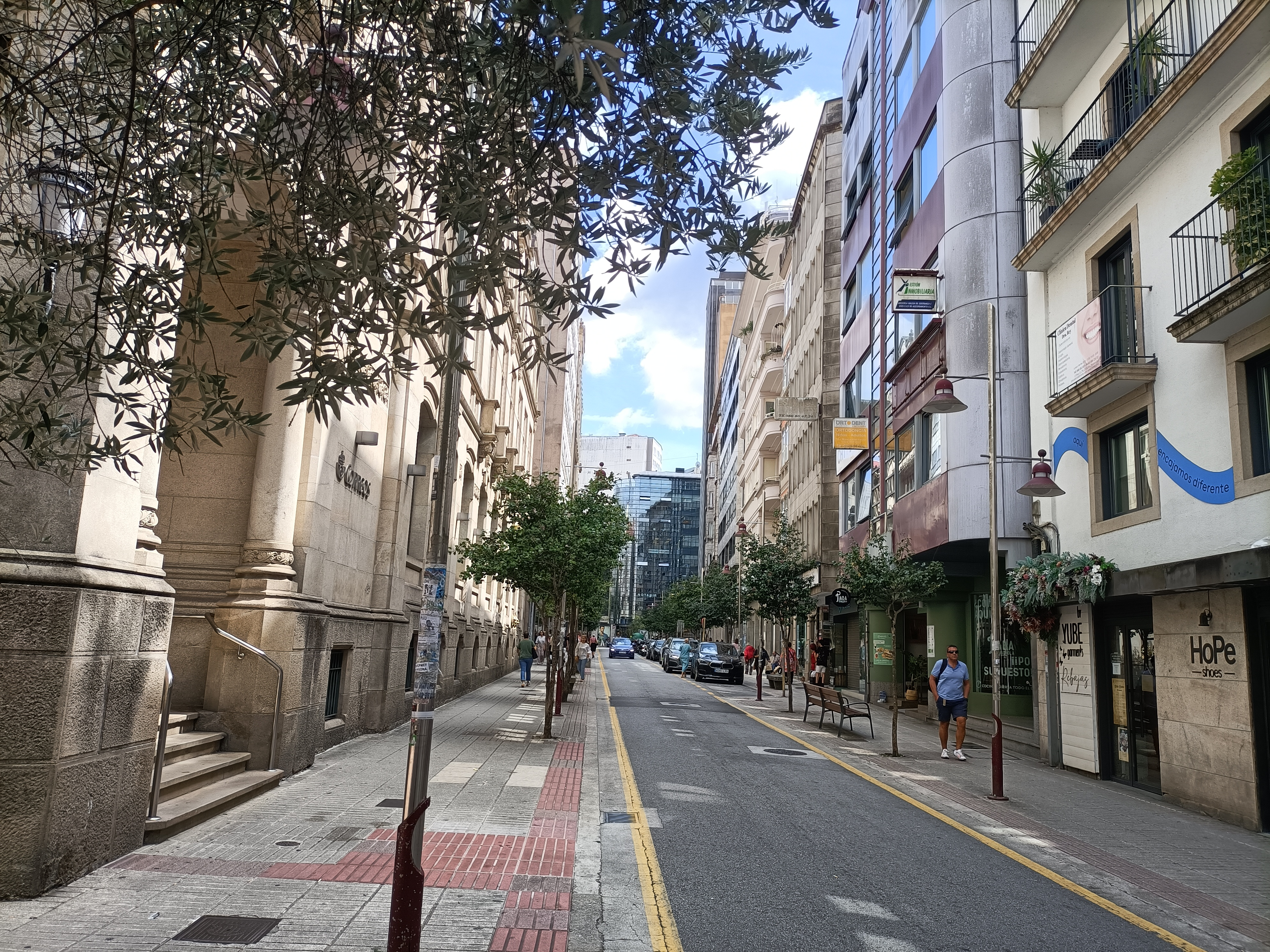
- García Camba Street in 2023
- Native name: Calle García Camba (Spanish)
- Type: Street
- Maintained by: Pontevedra City Council
- Location: Pontevedra, Spain
- Postal code: 36001
- Coordinates: 42.429861°N 8.644528°W

The Calle García Camba is a street in Pontevedra (Spain) located in the city centre, in the first urban expansion area. It is one of the main streets of Pontevedra.

== Origin of the name ==
The street is dedicated to Judge Miguel Gay García Camba, who held important positions in the city and was also president of the Liceo Casino between 1903 and 1907, and who donated the land necessary for the construction of the street.

== History ==
García Camba Street was opened in the first urban expansion area of the city in 1884, when Miguel Gay García Camba and his family donated land for the construction of a new street between the main streets Oliva and Peregrina.

In 1915, the construction of the new building for the city's central post office began on the corner of García Camba and Oliva streets, on a plot of land belonging to the Marquis of Riestra, which had belonged to Miguel Gay García Camba.

In the first decades of the 20th century, García Camba Street became one of the most important streets in the city, known as the street of entertainment due to the cinemas and theatres that were located there. On 20 February 1932, the Coliseum cinema opened at number 10 of the street, designed by the architect Antonio López Hernández (on the site of the current Viacambre building) and decorated with murals by Carlos Sobrino Buhigas, and closed in 1971. In 1948, the Malvar theatre-cinema was inaugurated at number 12 of the street, and closed its doors in 1996.

From 1943 to 1950, the art gallery in the Urquin restaurant on the street was responsible for the revival of the city's art scene, with exhibitions of works by painters such as Manuel Torres and Carlos Sobrino Buhigas. Its inauguration in 1943, during which Antonio Machín performed, was a major event.

In 1944, the municipal architect Juan Argenti Navajas designed the project to extend García Camba Street, which was never built.

In the following decades, distinctive commercial establishments were opened in this street of Pontevedra, such as the Capri pastry shop, inaugurated in 1963, or Los Castellanos. Renowned bookshops also occupied a significant place in the street. In 1973, the Seoane bookshop opened at number 6, which closed in 2003, and in 1987, the Escolma bookshop opened in the premises of the former Luis Martínez Gendra bookshop, at number 11.

In 1964, the iconic Las Torres building was inaugurated on the corner of Andrés Muruais Street, Pontevedra's skyscraper par excellence, whose land was sold on 18 November 1959.

On 18 April 2001, García Camba Street was closed to through traffic from Daniel de la Sota Street, leaving only one access for road traffic from Galicia Square through Andrés Muruais Street.

== Description ==
It is a flat street in the heart of the city centre with a straight course of 130 metres. Its average width is 15 metres.

It is a main street in the first urban expansion area of the city with one lane of traffic and two pavements from Peregrina and Andrés Muruais streets to Oliva Street. The whole street is lined with camellias on both sides.

It is one of the most important streets in the city and one of its nerve centres, where a large number of bank branches have been located for decades, which is why it is also known as Bank Street.

In 2021, García Camba Street was the most expensive street in the city where 12% of the owners are Dutch, British or Australian.

== Outstanding buildings ==
On the northwest corner of García Camba Street and Oliva Street is the building of the city's central post office, the headquarters of the Pontevedra provincial post office. The building belongs to the Art Nouveau style that prevailed in the early years of the 20th century. The main entrance is in the form of a chamfered corner with arches supported by classical columns and stone stairs leading to a raised entrance hall. It is decorated with geometric stonework on the façade, particularly on the upper level, with dormers and geometric windows on each level. The upper level, above the main entrance, is crowned by the stone coat of arms of the city. Inside, the building is built around a central space above a public hall, and the use of materials such as glass, wood and plaster, as well as the coloured glass vault, are particularly noteworthy.

At number 5 of the street is the Luciano Dazevedo House, a modernist building designed by the architect Andrés López de Ocáriz Robledo in 1914. The four upper floors were added in 1995. The balconies are identical to those of the Palace Hotel, which was located in Galicia Square.

The González Vega building, at number 8, is the best example of Rationalist Modernism preserved in the city, conceived in June 1939 by the architect Eloy Maquieira Fernández. The façade is symmetrically organised in four equal parts, the two central ones corresponding to the windows and the lateral ones to the balconies, on which windows and oeil-de-boeuf open, except on the fifth floor, where the balcony is continuous. The building is organised internally with two flats per floor.

The Las Torres building, designed by the architect Alfonso Barreiro Buján, was inaugurated at number 14 of the street in 1964. It is the tallest building in Pontevedra, with 16 floors and a height of 60 metres.

== Gallery ==
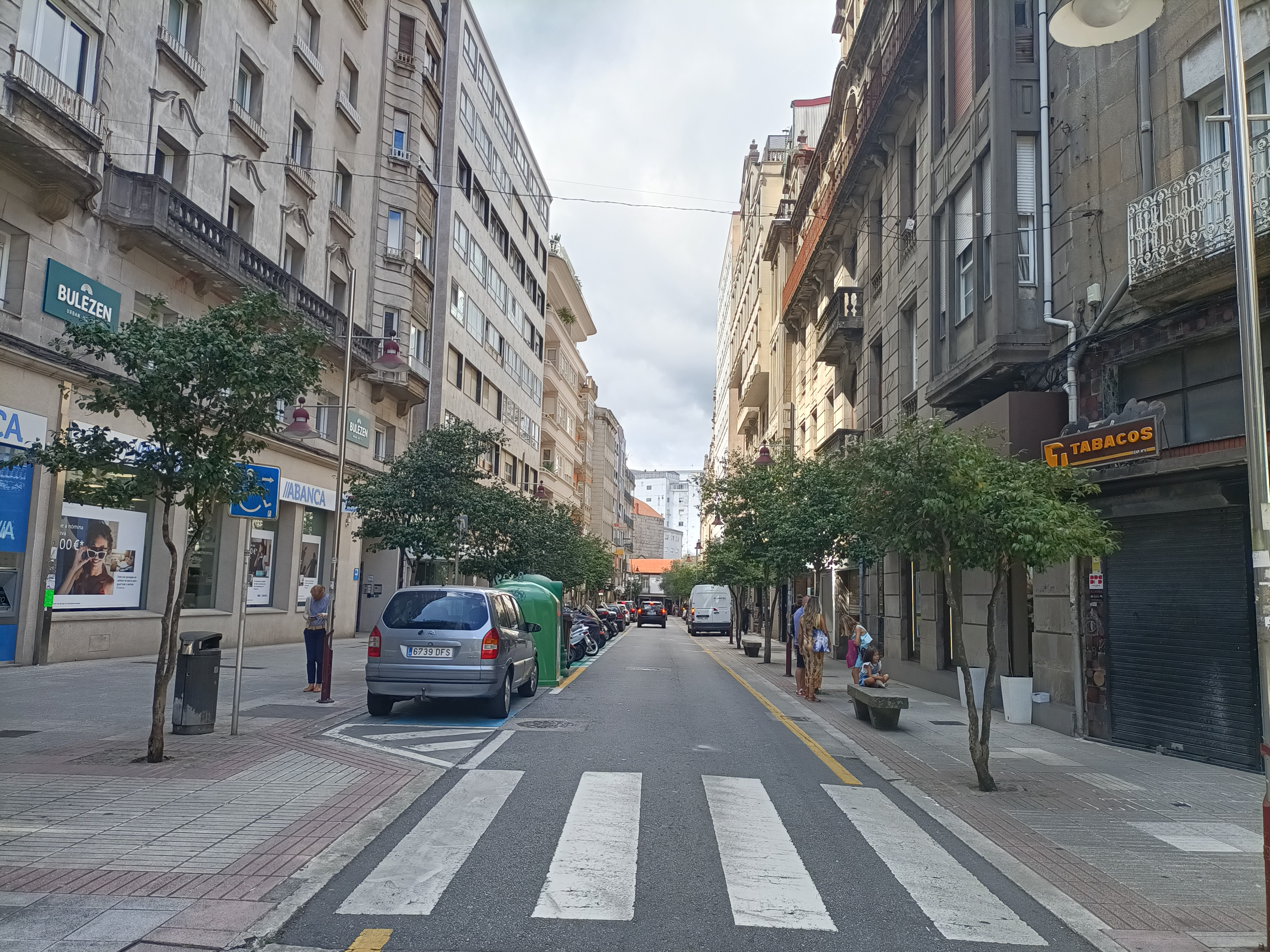
García Camba Street from the east

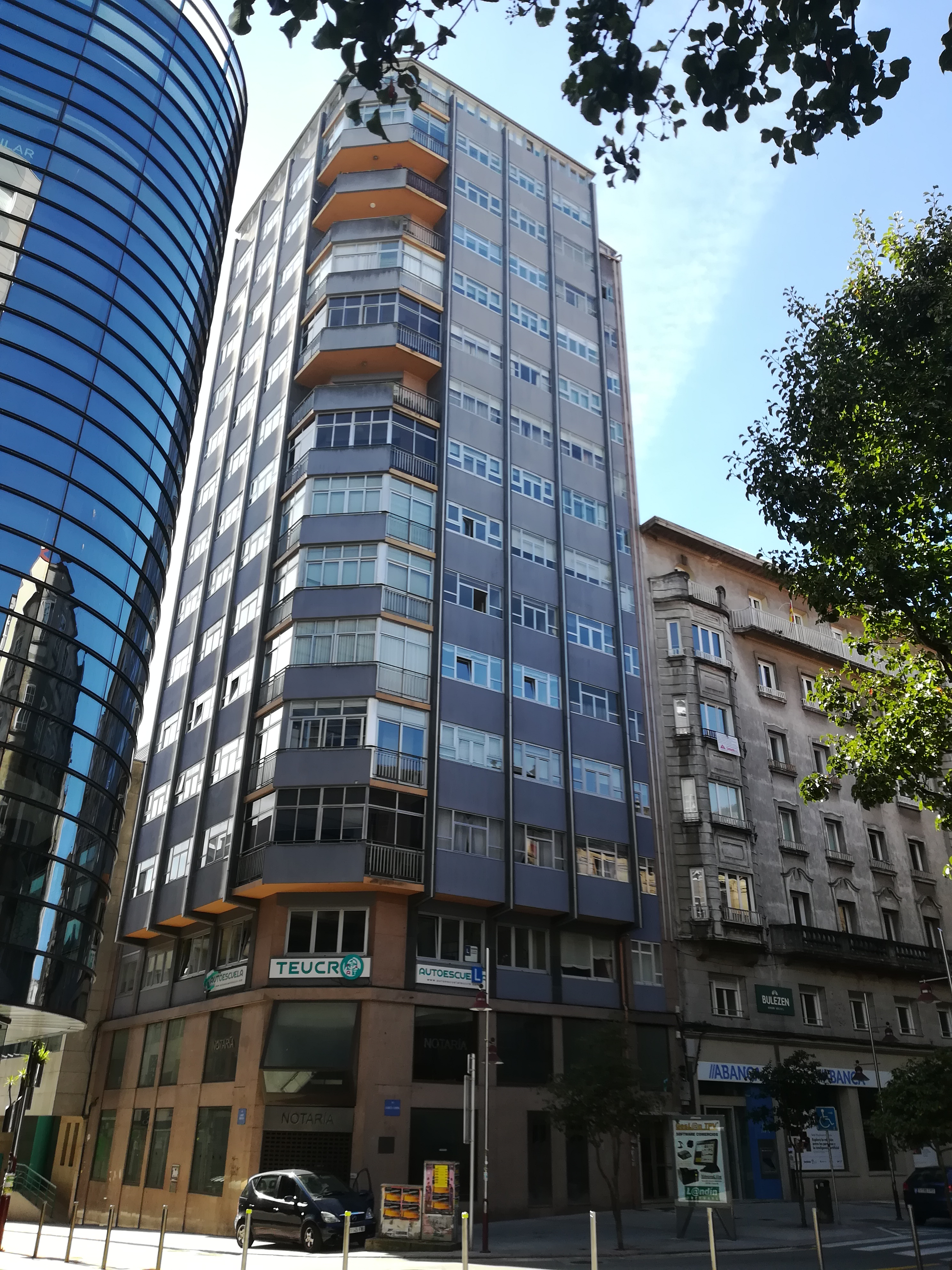
Las Torres Building

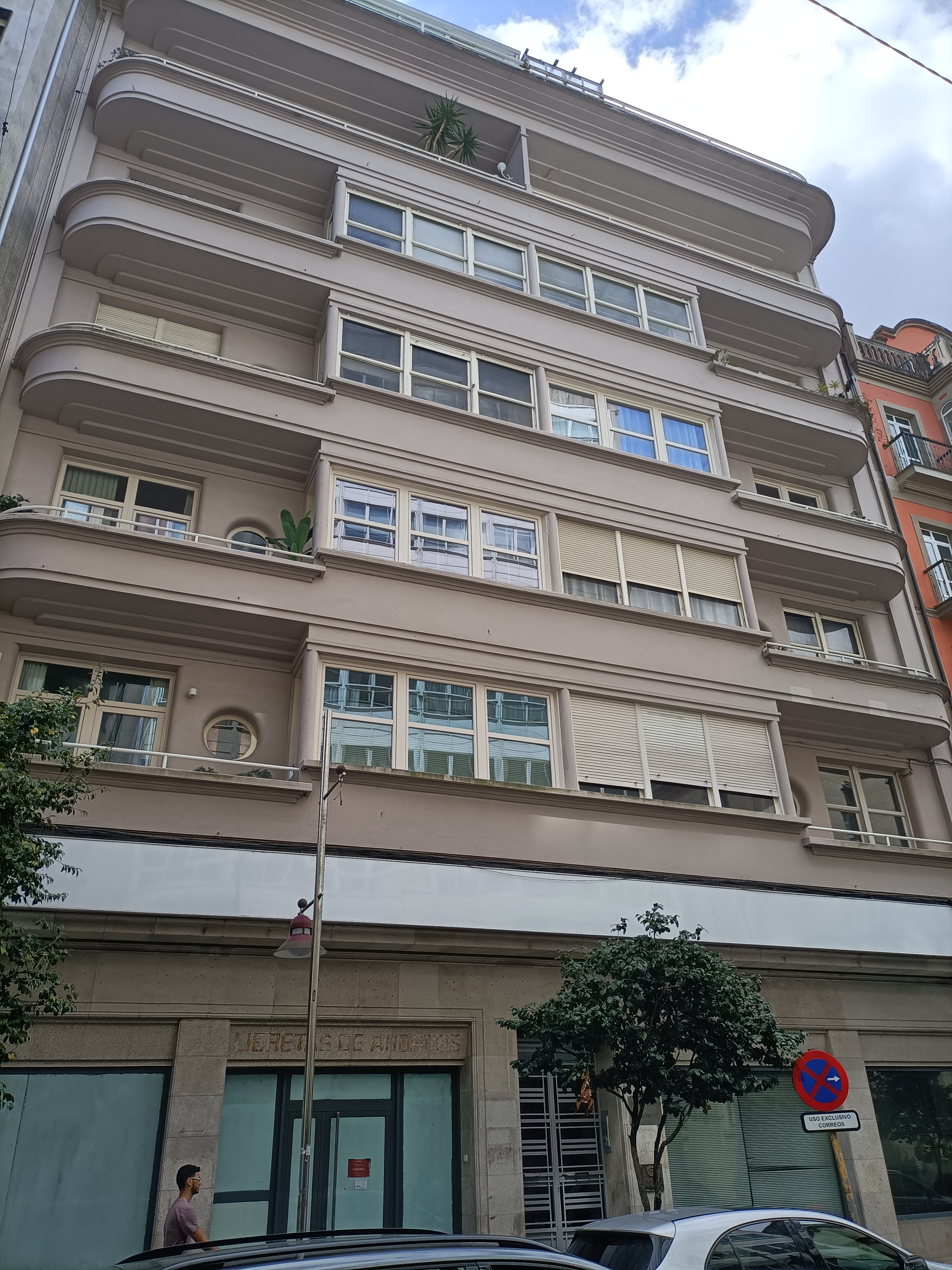
González Vega Building

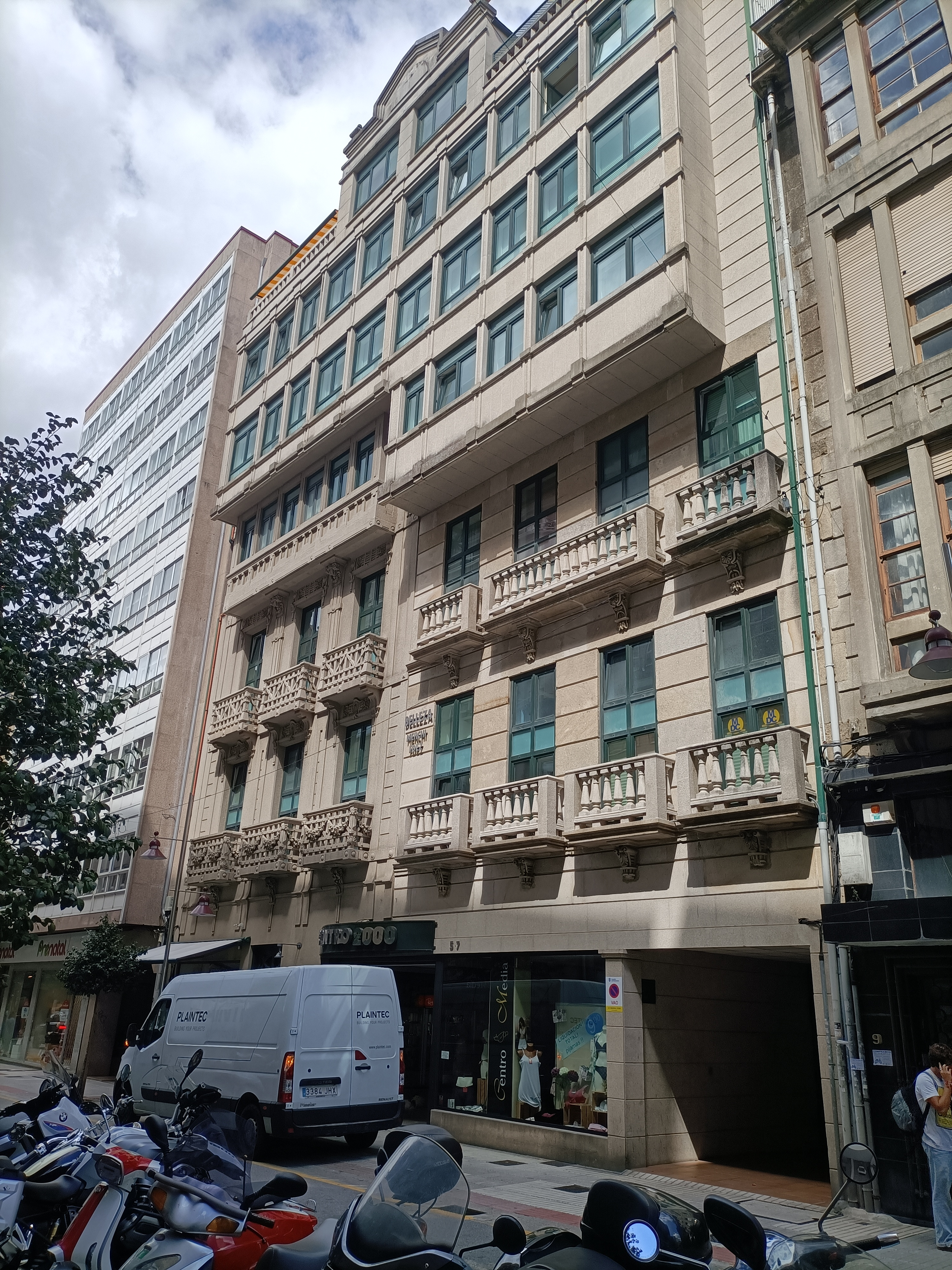
Luciano Dazevedo Building

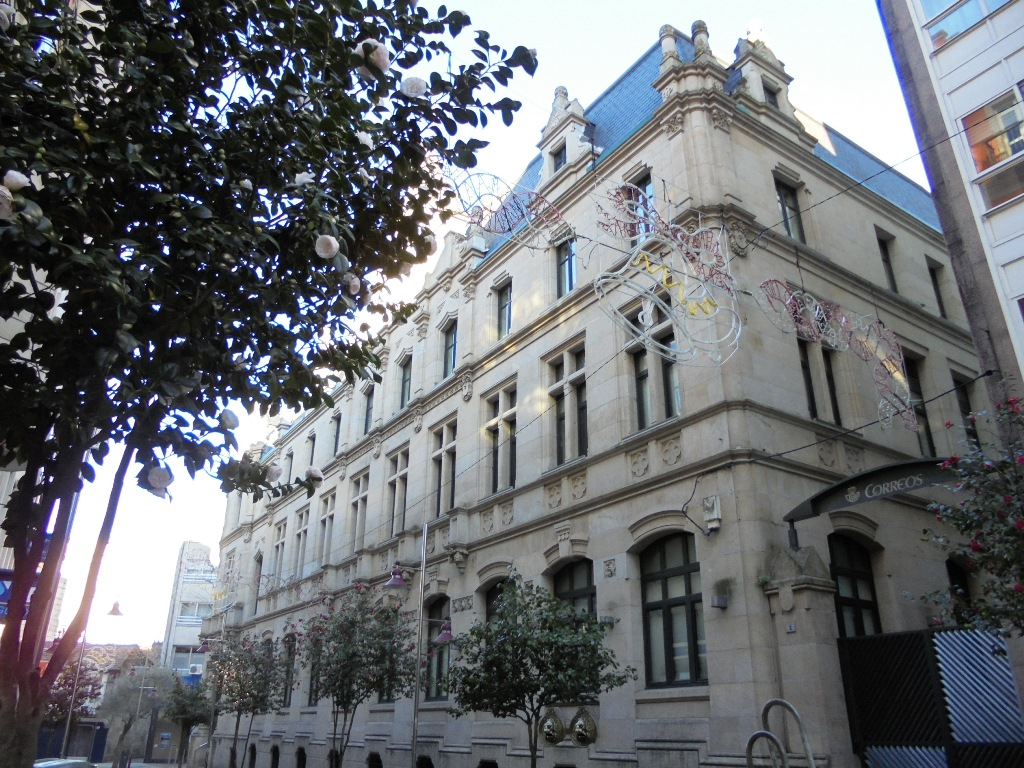
Façade of the central post office building

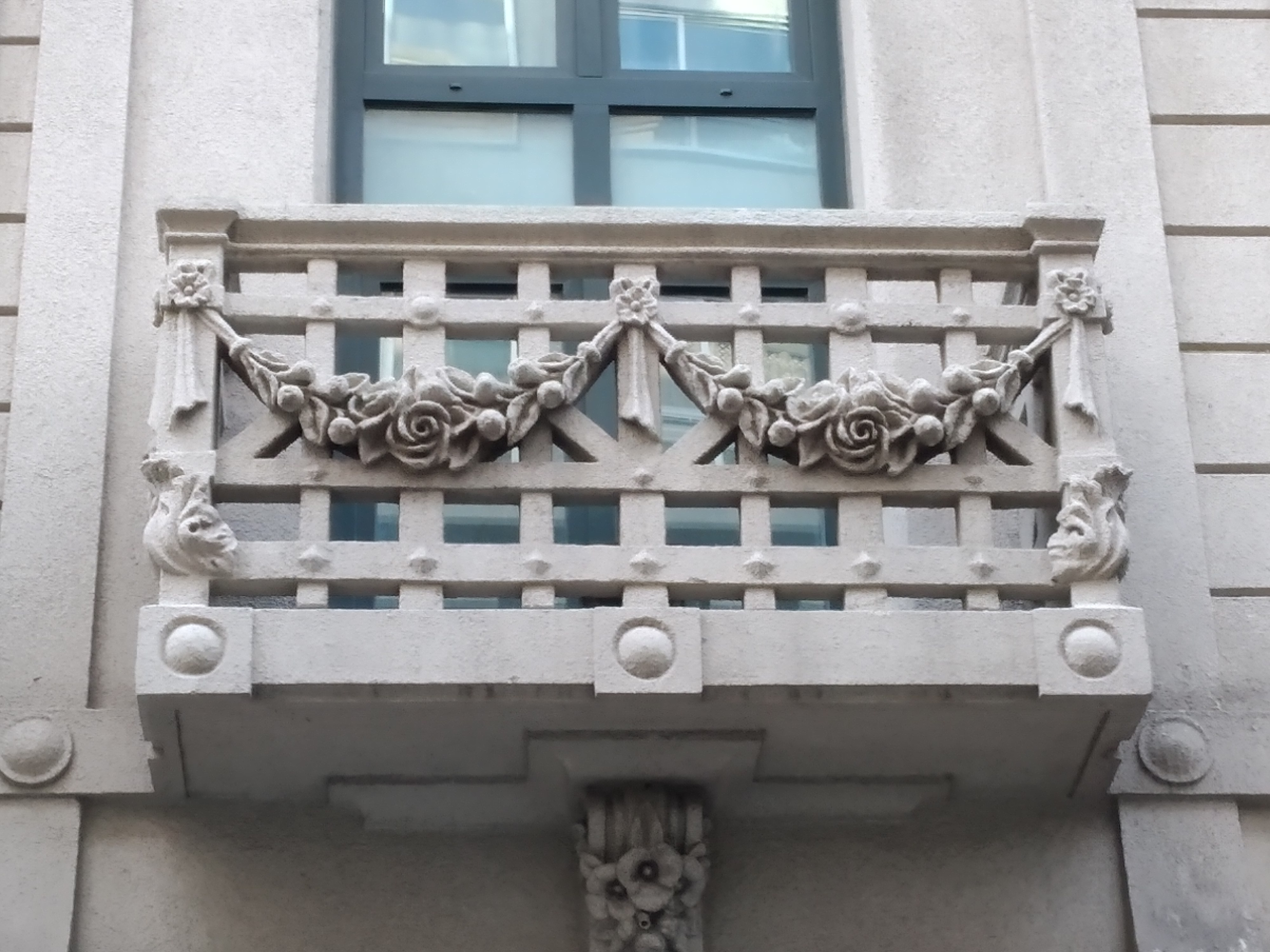
Art Nouveau balcony of the Luciano Dazevedo house at number 5

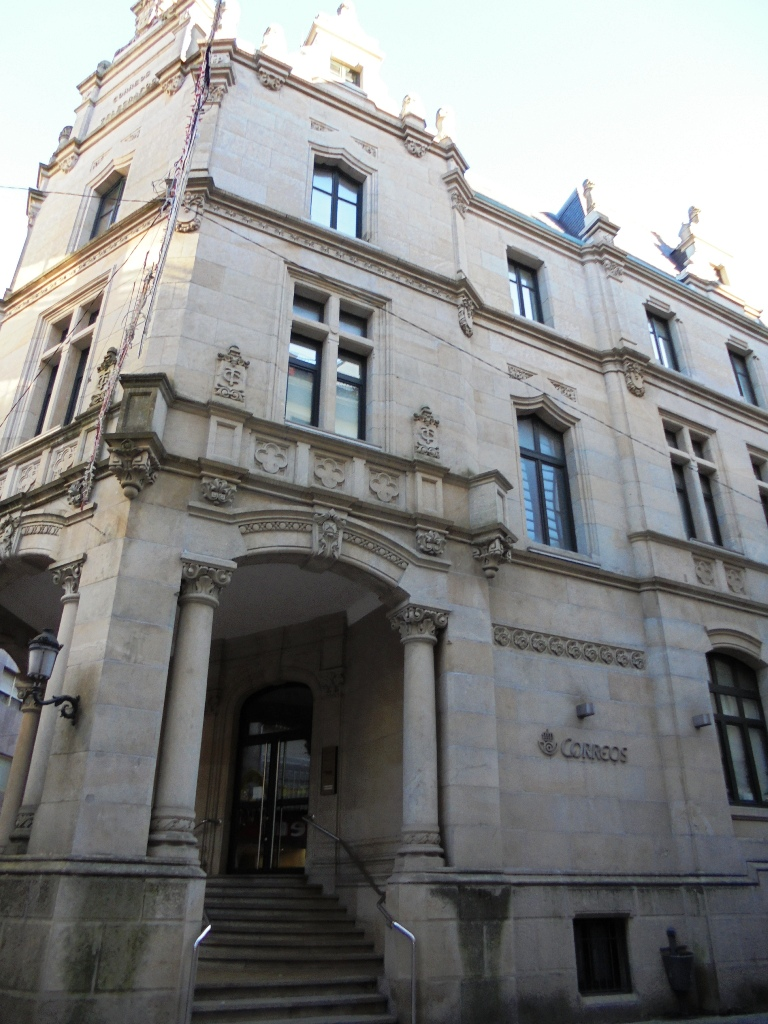
Entrance to the central post office building

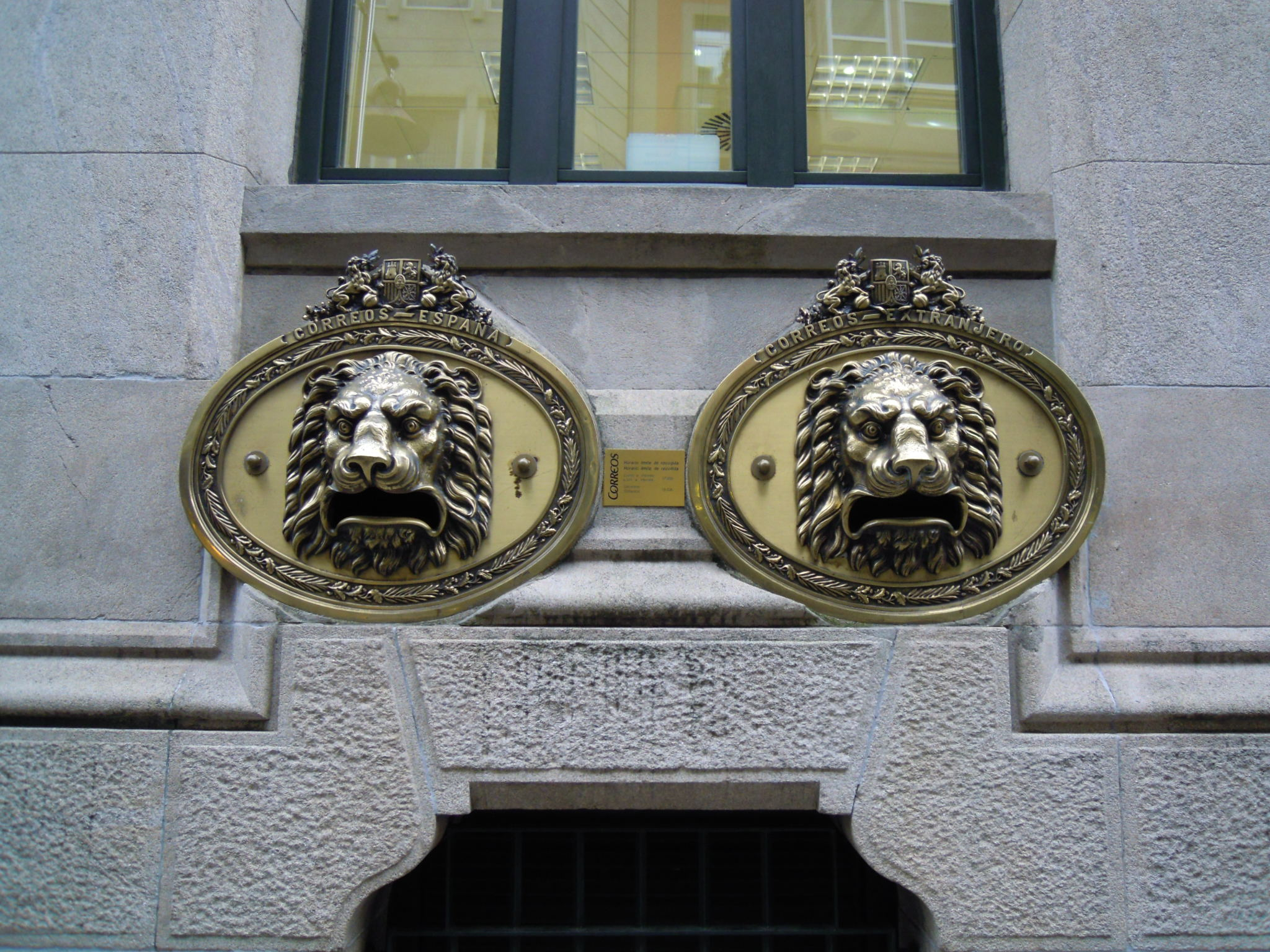
Lion heads on the windows of the mailboxes in García Camba Street

== See also ==
=== Bibliography ===
- Abelleira Doldán, Miguel (2016). La arquitectura en Galicia durante la autarquía: 1939-1953. Tomo I (PDF) (in Spanish). A Coruña: A Coruña University. p. 40 (chapitre 3.4).
- Fontoira Surís, Rafael (2009). Pontevedra monumental (in Galician). Pontevedra: Diputación de Pontevedra. p. 431. ISBN 9788484573272.

=== Related articles ===
- Ensanche-City Centre
- Calle de la Oliva
- Pontevedra Central Post Office
- Daniel de la Sota Street
- Glorieta de Compostela

=== External links ===
- García Camba Street
