= Plaza de Barcelos =

Square in Pontevedra, Galicia, Spain

Barcelos square
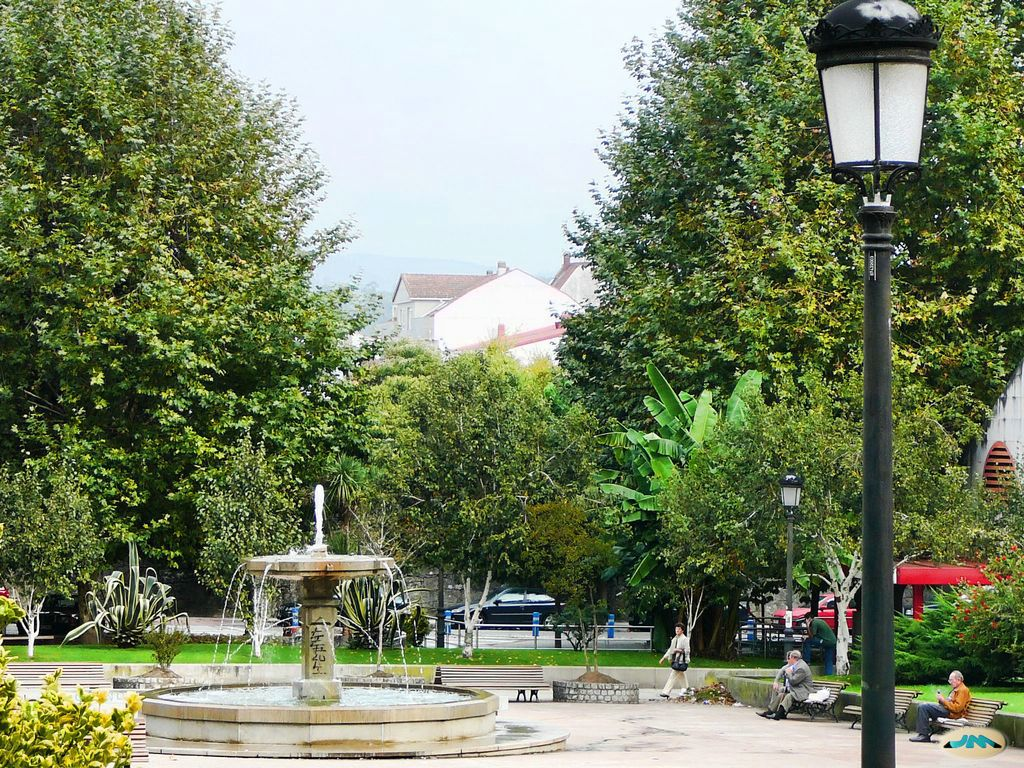
- Barcelos square
- Native name: Plaza de Barcelos (Spanish)
- Type: plaza
- Maintained by: Pontevedra City Council
- Location: Pontevedra, Spain
- Postal code: 36002
- Coordinates: 42.431060°N 8.640536°W

The Plaza de Barcelos is a square dating from the beginning of the 20th century located in the city centre of Pontevedra (Spain), to the east of the historic centre of Pontevedra.

== Origin of the name ==
The square is named after the Portuguese city of Barcelos, with which Pontevedra has been twinned since 1970.

== History ==
In the 19th century, the Pontevedra cattle fair, whose origins date back to the Middle Ages, was held on the site of the current Palm Trees Park. At the end of the 19th century, when the Palace of the Deputation of Pontevedra was built and the Palm Trees Park was created, it was necessary to move the fairground to another location due to the lack of space. After several controversies, the proposal of the builder Manuel Vidal Boullosa was finally accepted in 1896, offering a plot of land (an esplanade) located between the old Progreso Street to the south (now Benito Corbal Street) and the wall of the Convent of Saint Clare to the north, which would become the present-day Plaza de Barcelos. In 1898 the land was bought by the city council of Pontevedra for 40,000 pesetas.

The land was leveled and plane trees were planted for the installation of the fair and was named Campo de la Feria (Fairground), where fairs were held for decades since 1900.

In August 1970, during the festivities of the Pilgrim Virgin, the city was twinned with the Portuguese town of Barcelos.

In 1971 the fairground was renamed Plaza de Barcelos, in reference to the twinning of Pontevedra with this Portuguese city which took place in August 1970. In the 1970s the square was turned into a car park and the street market that was previously held in the Plaza de la Herrería began to be held there. The market in which the traders sold their textile and food products was held in the square on the 1st, 8th, 15th and 23rd of each month until 23 September 1988.

Between March and October 1997, the square underwent a complete refurbishment. A large three-storey underground car park was built in the basement and the surface was completely redesigned. The plane trees were cut down and only one row remained on the north side of the square, closest to the wall of St. Clare's Convent.

In January 1998, the Tree Monument, the work of the sculptor José Luis Penado, was installed on the south side of the square to commemorate the many plane trees that were cut down during the construction of the underground car park and the development of the square.

In September 2016, two multi-sports courts were installed in the north of the square next to the convent wall, consisting of a court with baskets and goals and a table for ping-pong.

== Description ==
The square has a square shape and an area of 16,000 square metres. Rouco, Xenaro Pérez de Villamil, Vasco da Ponte, Campo da Feira, San Antoniño and Perfecto Feijóo streets converge here.

The square is laid out as a garden square, with compartmentalized gardens, paved paths, trees, a children's playground, a central area with benches and a stone fountain. The north side of the square is dominated by the large six-metre high wall of the gardens of the convent of St Clare, which is protected as a heritage asset. In the southern centre of the square is the Tree Monument. It represents a large, 6-metre-high iron tree whose branches are topped with the typical crests of the roosters of Barcelos.

In the basement of the square is the largest underground car park in the city, with 906 parking spaces.

On the south side of the square there are cafeterias and on the east, west and south sides there are shops. On the southwest side of the square is also the Barcelos multilingual public school.

== Gallery ==
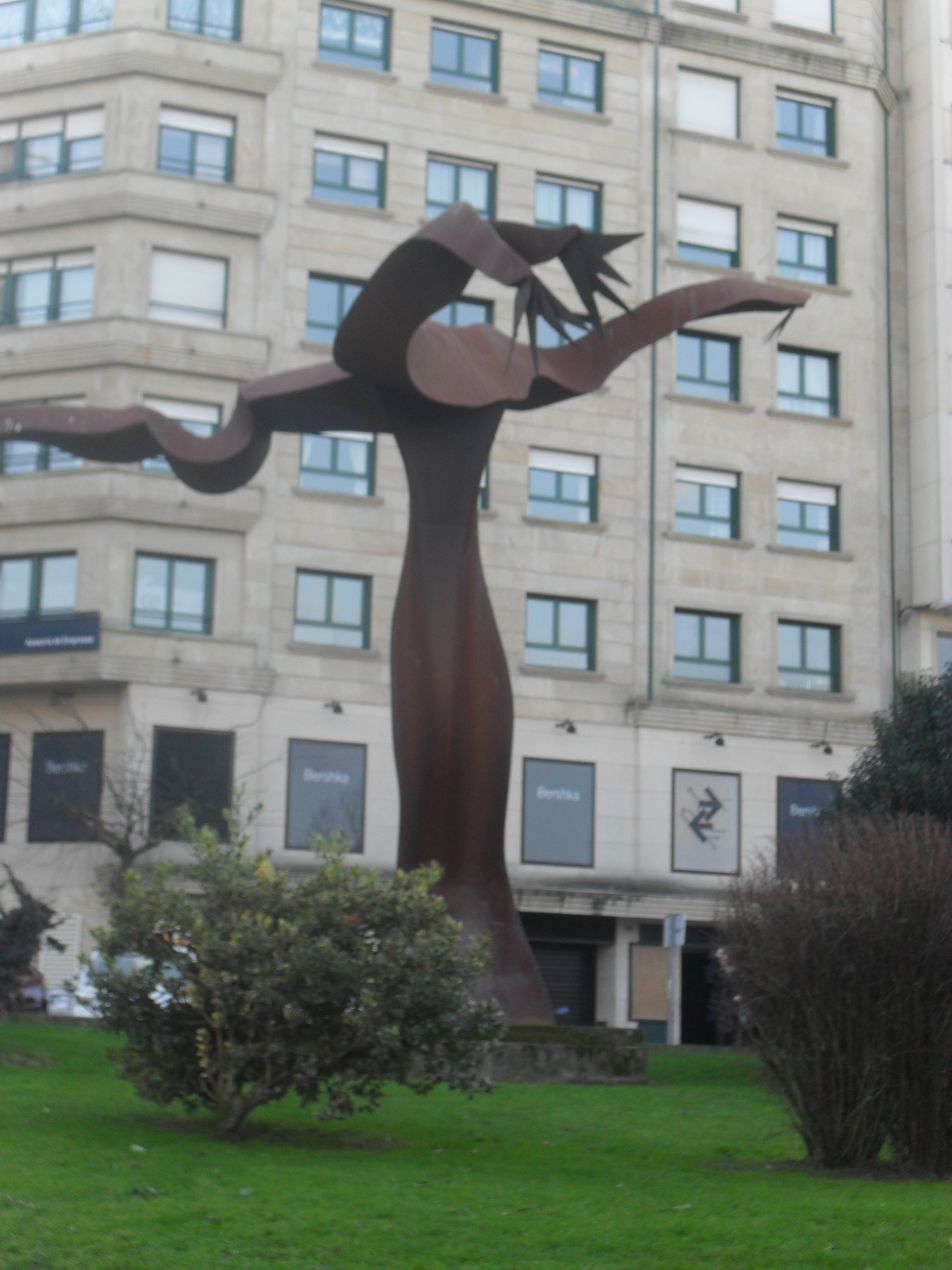
Tree monument on the south side of the square

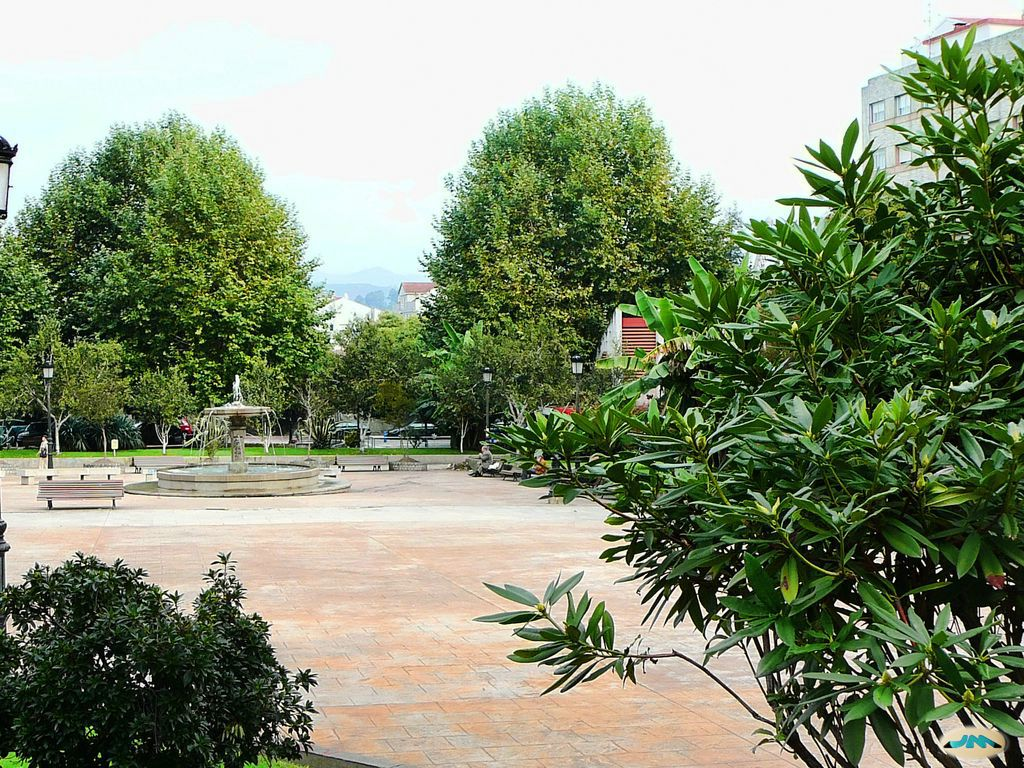
Trees in the square

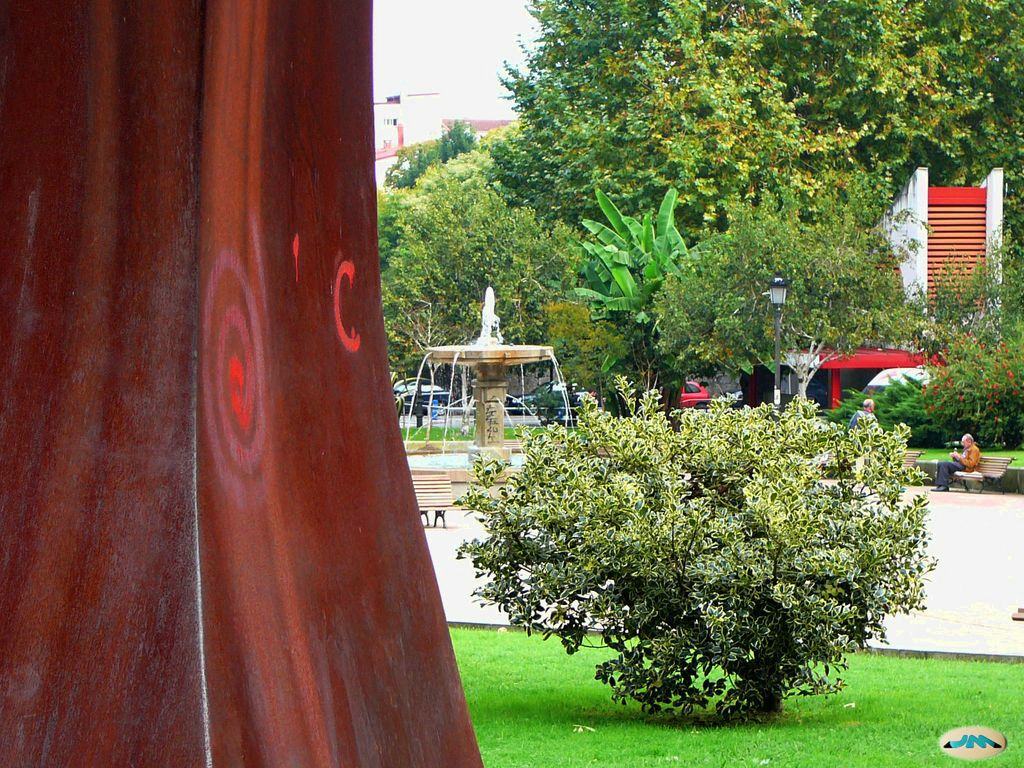
Fountain in the square

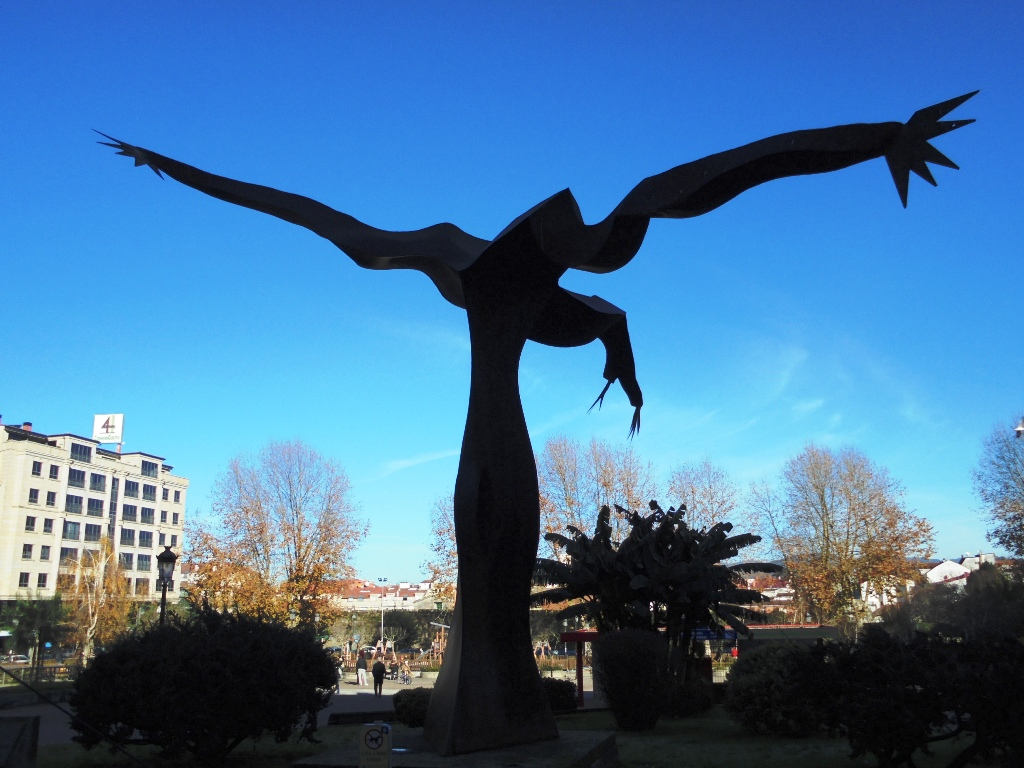
Tree monument

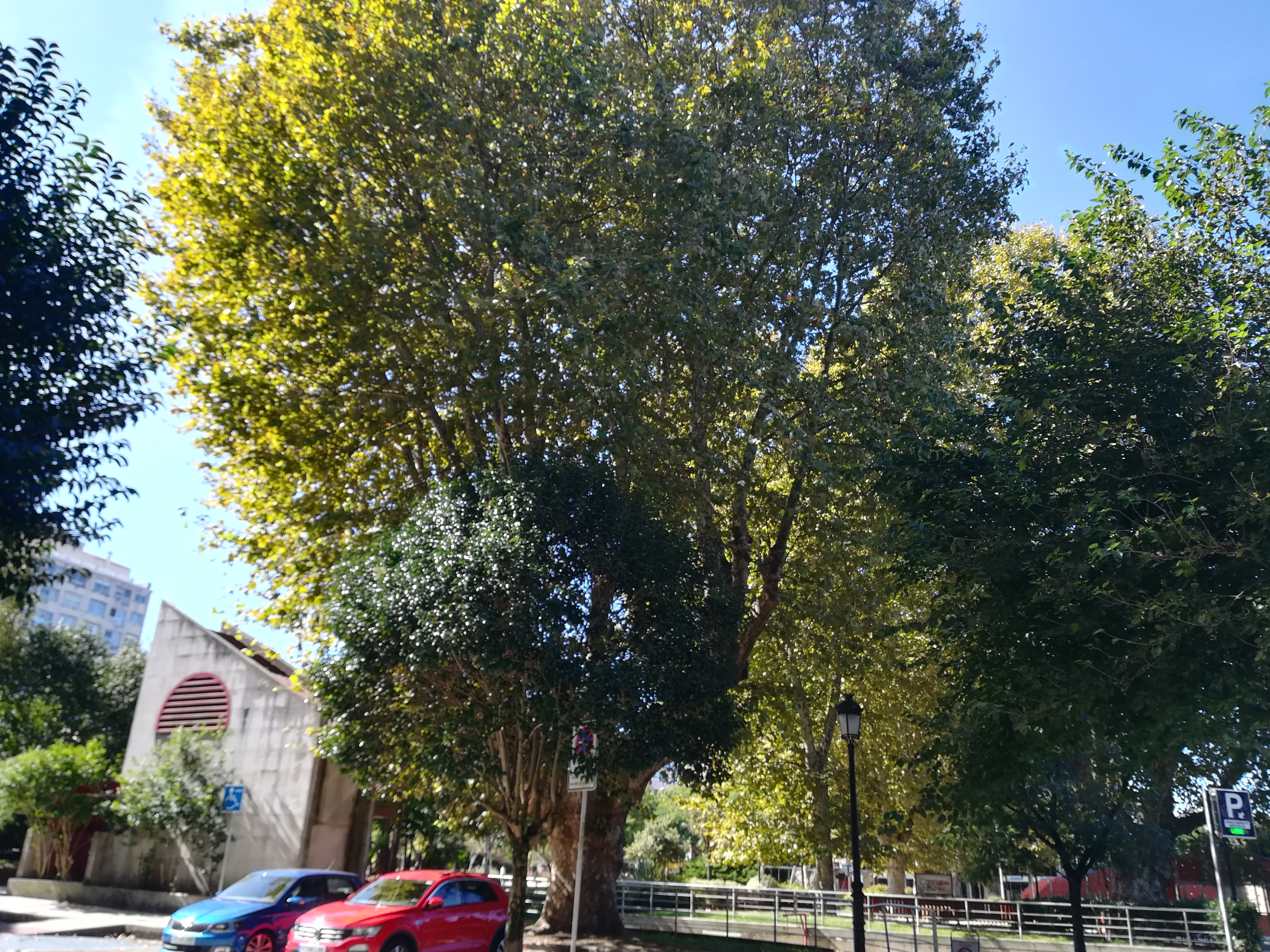
North side

== See also ==
=== Related articles ===
- Sainte Clare's Convent
- Calle Benito Corbal
- Ensanche-City Centre
- Palm Trees Park

=== External links ===
- Praza de Barcelos on the website Xunta de Galicia Tourism
