= Calle Daniel de la Sota =

Street in Pontevedra, Spain

Daniel de la Sota Street
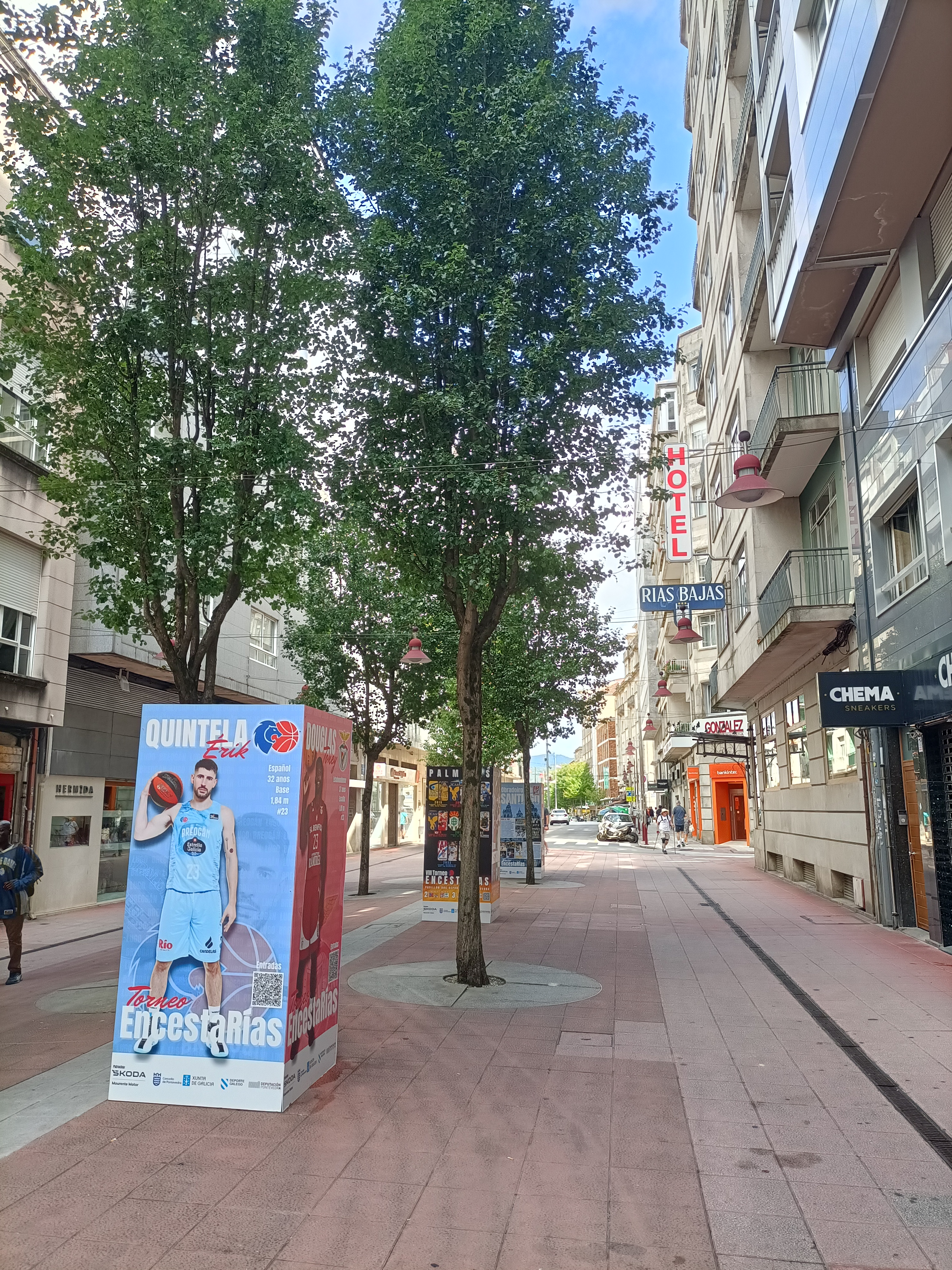
- Daniel de la Sota Street in 2023
- Native name: Calle Daniel de la Sota (Spanish)
- Type: Street
- Maintained by: Pontevedra City Council
- Location: Pontevedra, Spain
- Postal code: 36001
- Coordinates: 42.430111°N 8.643278°W

Construction
- Completion: 1958

The Calle Daniel de la Sota is a central street in the Spanish city of Pontevedra, located in the city's first expansion area. It is one of the best-known streets in Pontevedra.

== Origin of the name ==
The name refers to the military engineer and politician Daniel de la Sota Valdecilla, in recognition of his work in the city. He promoted the construction of the Saint Ferdinand Barracks, was president of the Pontevedra Provincial Council, promoted the establishment of the Galicia Biological Mission in Pontevedra, collaborated in the creation of the Pontevedra Museum and was the first president of the Pontevedra Provincial Savings Bank.

== History ==
The street was designed as a direct thoroughfare through a central area of the city, linking Benito Corbal street in the north and Peregrina, García Camba and Andrés Muruais streets in the south. In September 1955, the opening of the street known at the time as the extension of Cobián Roffignac street was pending before the Board of the Local Credit Bank of Spain. Work began at the end of 1956.

Following the death of Daniel de la Sota on 11 February 1958, Pontevedra City Council decided on 28 February to name the new street after him. The street was inaugurated on the afternoon of Sunday 7 December 1958 in the presence of a large public and various representatives, as well as the authorities.

Since its opening in 1958, the street has become a focal point of the city, home to a number of well-known shops, a prestigious hotel and a popular café and nightclub. As early as 1844, on the corner of what would become the new Daniel de la Sota Street and Peregrina Street a century later, the Viñas printing house was established, whose clients included Castelao and Gonzalo Torrente Ballester. In the 1950s, the premises were remodelled and extended to house a bookshop and stationery shop. The Viñas bookshop closed its doors in October 2004.

In 1965, the iconic Hotel Rías Bajas was inaugurated on Daniel de la Sota street, on the corner of Castelao street. It is the city's oldest hotel after the Casa del Barón National Tourism Parador, opened in 1955.

In 1969, the popular Chacón toy and sports goods shop opened its doors in this street, having moved from Cobián Roffignac Street, where it had opened in 1961. The shop moved to Fray Juan de Navarrete Street in January 2023.

In 1972, the emblematic Daniel Café opened its doors on the corner of Benito Corbal street. It was a large two-storey establishment, the most modern and popular in Pontevedra in the 1970s, 1980s and 1990s. It closed its doors in February 1997. In 1981, the Daniel nightclub, the most traditional in the city, opened its doors in an annexe to the café, and was frequented by the current King, Felipe VI, when he was a student at the Naval Military Academy. After the COVID-19 pandemic, the nightclub reopened under the name Lelé de Noite.

Throughout its history, the street has been a major traffic artery in the city until the southern half became pedestrianised in 2001. In 2023, a project was presented to give the northern half of the street a single platform to reinforce its pedestrian priority.

== Description ==
This is a 138-metre-long, straight, flat pedestrian street in the heart of the city centre, linking Benito Corbal street with García Camba, Peregrina and Andrés Muruais streets. Its average width is 12 metres. It is a central street in the city's first expansion area, almost on the edge of Pontevedra's historic centre.

This is one of the busiest shopping streets in Pontevedra. It has around twenty shops, a hotel, a bank and a nightclub.

The paving in the pedestrianised part of the street is a reddish-pink colour, bordered by a central band of granite. At the junction with Benito Corbal street, the paving is in polished mosaic and is laid out in a circular shape.

The pedestrianised part of the street is planted with a variety of trees: 12 Callery pear trees, 1 common pear tree and 8 plum trees.

== Gallery ==
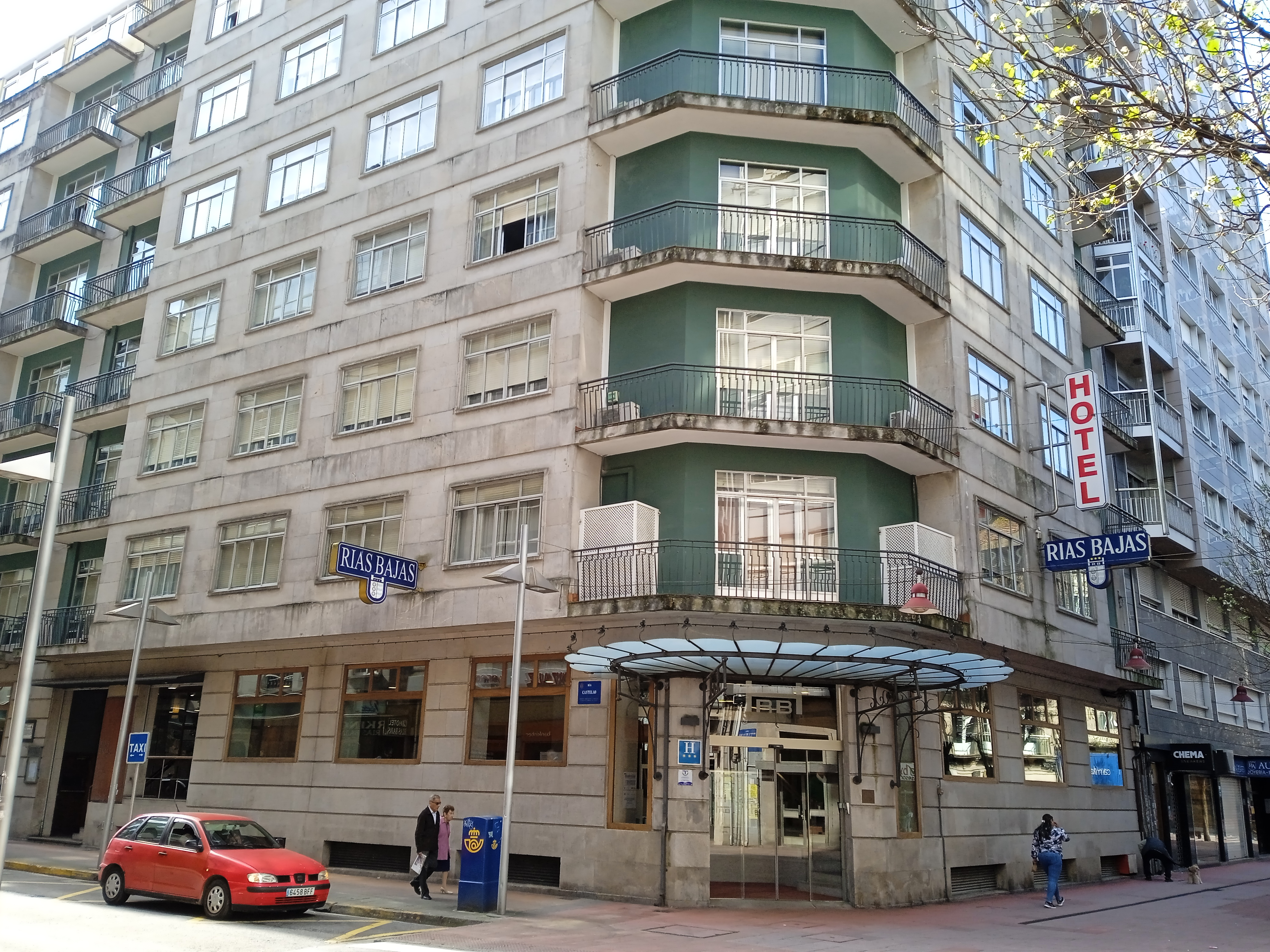
The Rias Bajas Hotel in the centre of the street

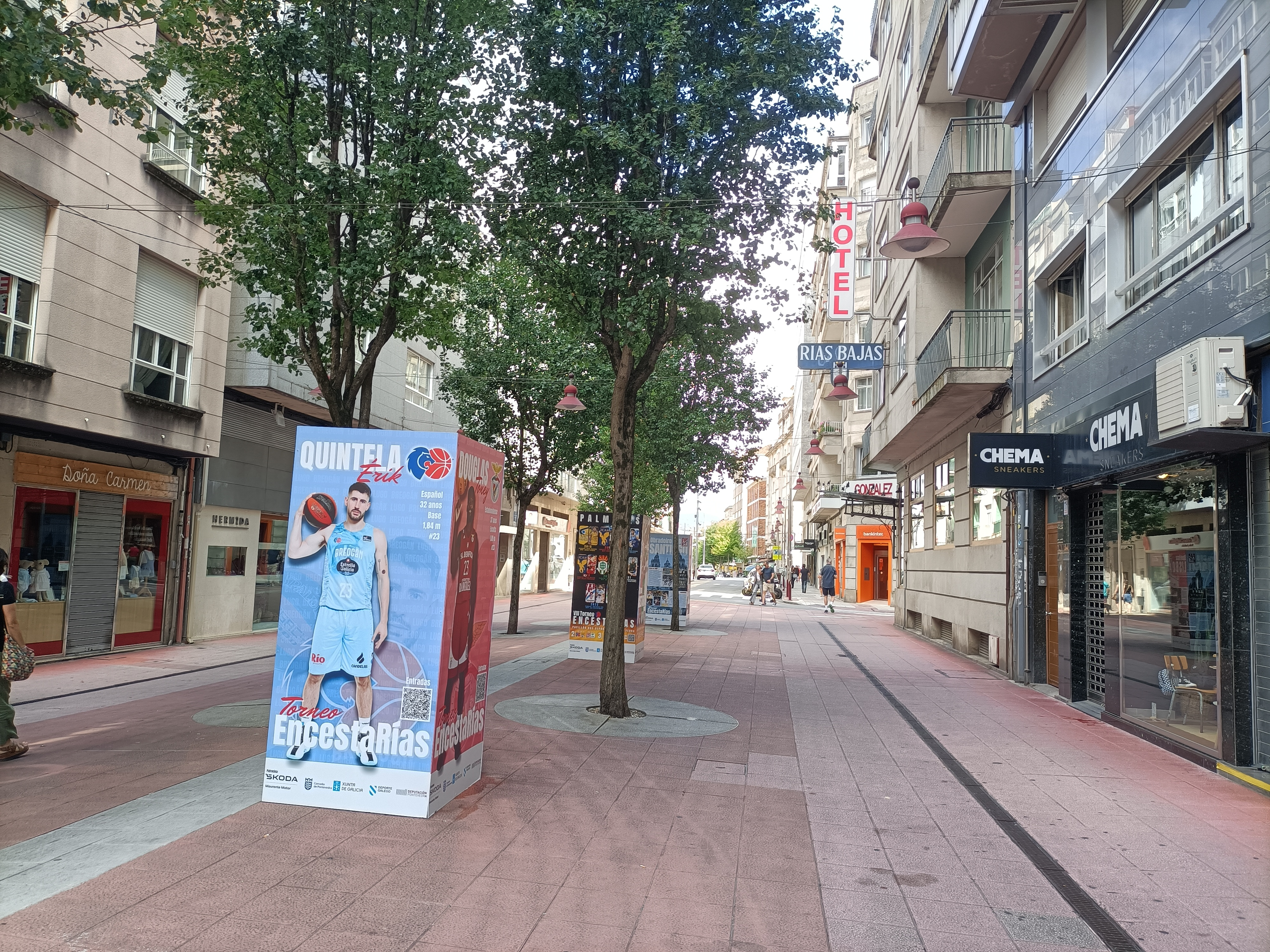
Daniel de la Sota Street

== See also ==
=== Bibliography ===
- Blanco Dios, Jaime Bernardo; Castro González, Amancio (2010). As árbores da cidade de Pontevedra (in Galician). Pontevedra: Concello de Pontevedra. p. 165; 177–178. ISBN 978-84-606-5147-5.
- Juega Puig, Juan (2000). As rúas de Pontevedra (in Galician). Pontevedra: Diputación de Pontevedra. pp. 74–75. ISBN 84-8457-044-4.

=== Related articles ===
- Ensanche-City Centre
- Benito Corbal Street
- García Camba Street
