= Ensanche de Pontevedra =

Neighbourhood in Pontevedra, Spain

Ensanche-Pontevedra City Centre Ensanche de Pontevedra
- Neighbourhood of Pontevedra
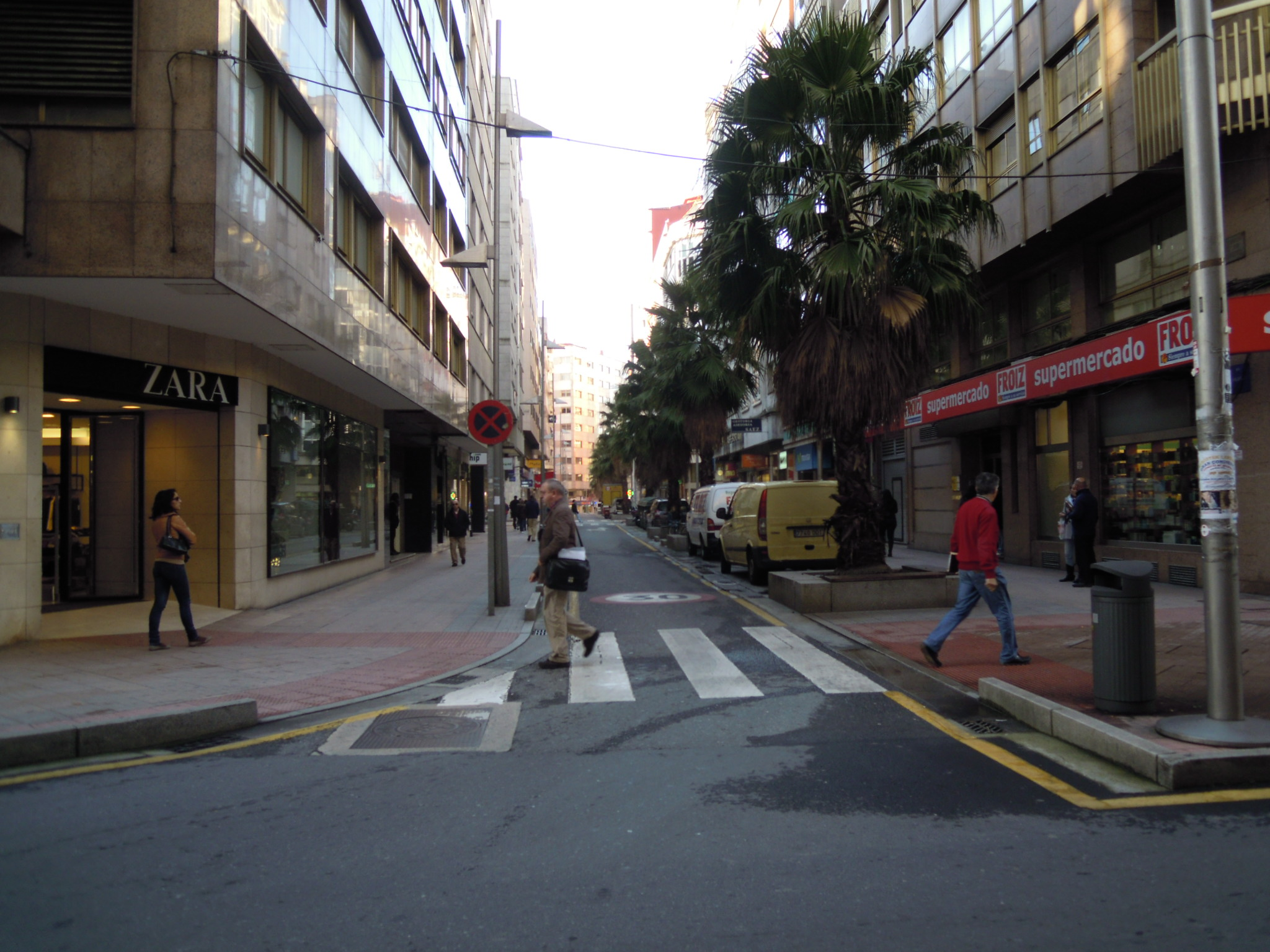
- Sagasta Street, inaugurated in 1893 in the Ensanche area
- Interactive map of Ensanche-Pontevedra City Centre
- Coordinates: 42°25′47.9″N 8°38′34.8″W
- Country: Spain
- City: Pontevedra
- Postal code: 36001, 36002

The Ensanche of Pontevedra is the neighbourhood that forms the centre of the Spanish city of Pontevedra, made up of several successive extensions to the city outside the old town. The term Ensanche means " widening " in Spanish and refers to the expanding areas of Spanish cities towards the end of the 19th century, when the demographic explosion and the industrial revolution led to the demolition of the old city walls and the construction of new areas outside the old fortified walls.

== History ==
Since 1833, when Pontevedra became the capital of its province, a radical transformation of the urban structure has taken place. The city walls were demolished between 1852 and 1875, paving the way for urban growth beyond the walled enclosure. The town opened up to the surrounding countryside, the old roads leading to the medieval town were widened and developed, and new streets were designed and laid out. In the last third of the 19th century, a large part of the new Pontevedra was designed, mainly thanks to the contribution of the architect Alejandro Sesmero. The status of provincial capital and the political influence of several Pontevedrians by adoption, such as Eugenio Montero Ríos, Augusto González Besada, Eduardo Vincenti and Gabino Bugallal Araújo, favoured the transformation and modernisation of the urban structure. The increase in population with sustained demographic growth made it necessary to plan the extension of the city and the embellishment of public spaces. The planning of the Ensanche area of the city revolved around the main roads linking Pontevedra to Orense, Marín and Portugal.

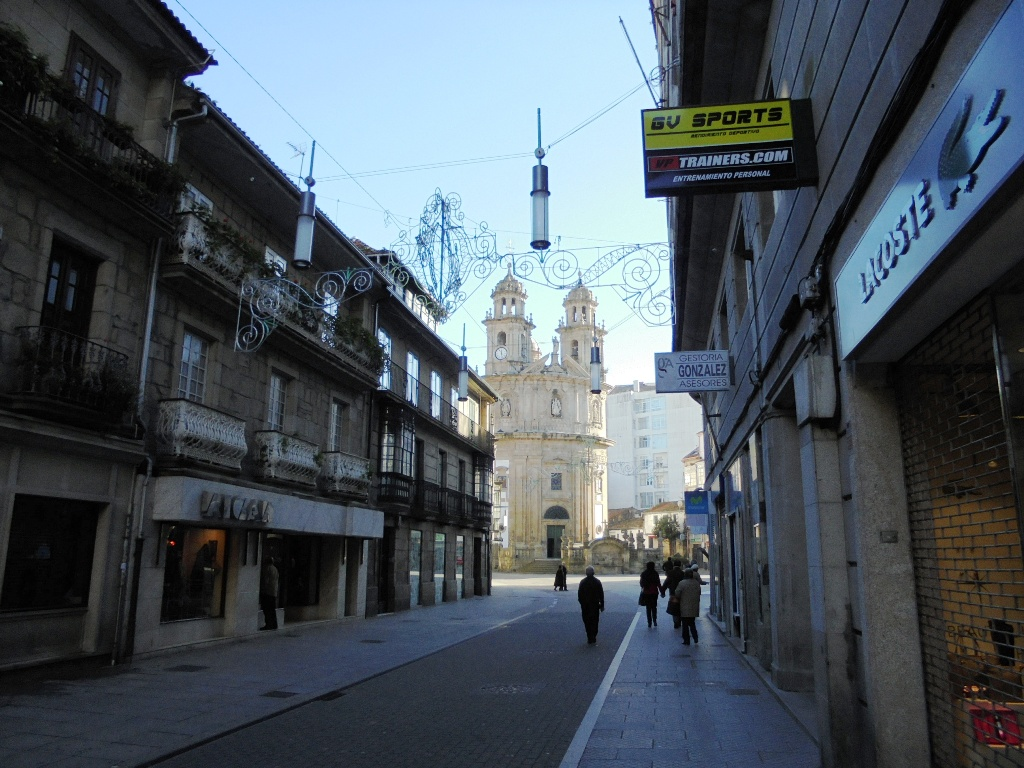
Michelena Street.

The liberal politician and bourgeois businessman Francisco Antonio Riestra Vallaure was responsible for most of the city's early expansion (l'Ensanche). Pontevedra's new street system was initiated by Francisco Riestra with the laying out of Michelena Street in 1856, along the line of the old city wall. In 1880, Alejandro Sesmero planned the bourgeois expansion to the south-west of the old town, with the construction of the España Square from 1880 and Alameda Street in 1881 (formerly known as Straw Street) and the Gran Vía de Montero Ríos in 1893. The project was completed with the gradual development of Riestra Street. The opening up of these new streets brought the medieval town closer to this new part of the city. Similarly, as part of this bourgeois expansion, the Alameda de Pontevedra, corresponding to the former Dominican field, was redeveloped at the same time as the España Square, and the Palm Trees Park, the former St Joseph's fairground, began to be developed. Between 1884 and 1926, three remarkable buildings were constructed on the Gran Vía de Montero Ríos to house the provincial capital's institutions (the Palace of the Deputation, the Provincial High School building, the School of Arts and Crafts building and the Normal School) and between 1905 and 1909, opposite the Doctor Marescot gardens, the new large building of the Saint Ferdinand barracks was built.

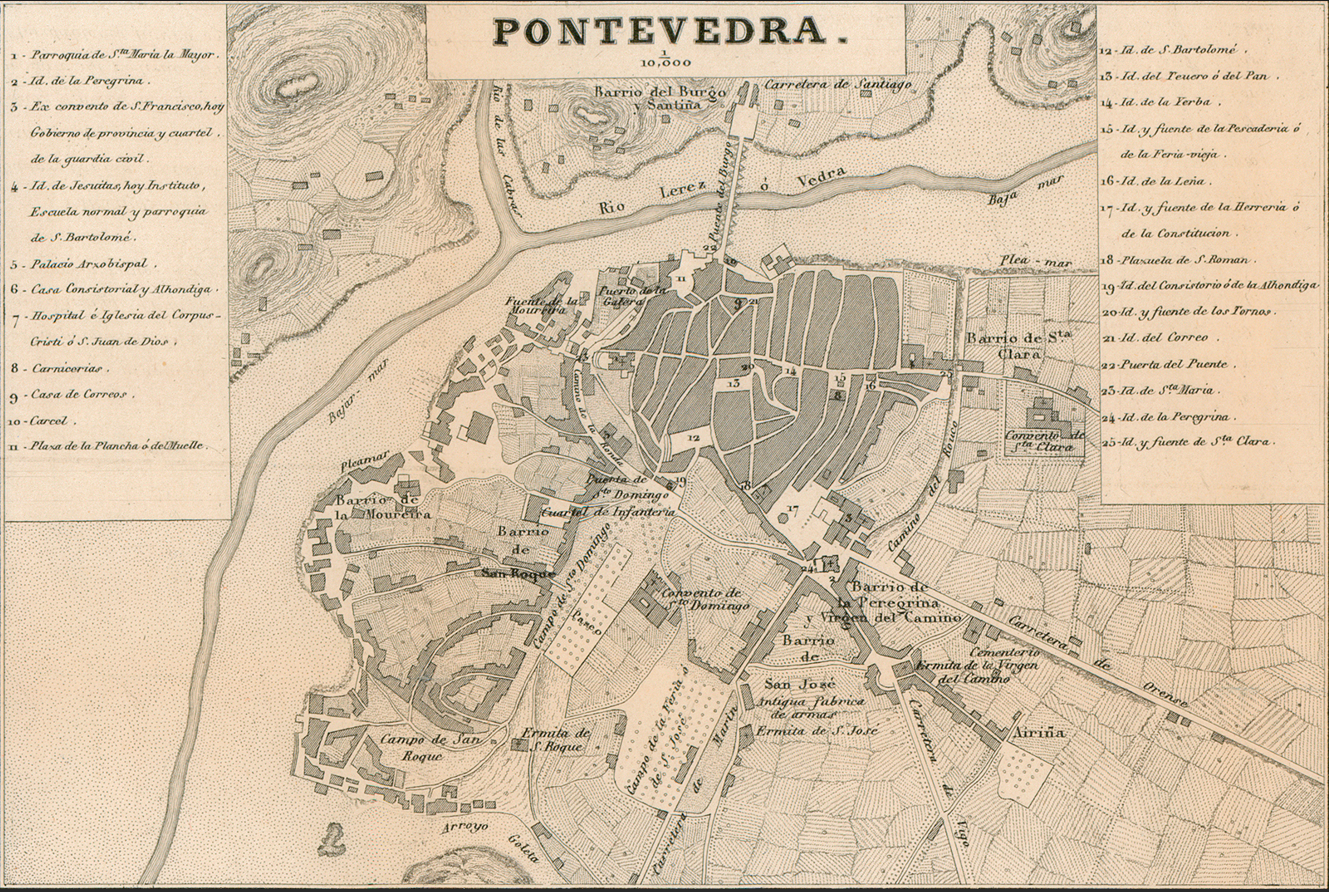
Map of Pontevedra in 1856 with the roads to Orense, Marín and Portugal, which served as the axis for the urban development of the Ensanche, the new part of the city.

The city also expanded along the main roads on which urban growth was structured, leading to Orense, Marín, Ponte Caldelas and Tuy and Portugal. New roads were built and developed in 1844 towards Orense, (the central section of which, corresponding to the current Benito Corbal Street, was developed from 1866 onwards), towards Marín between 1847 and 1851 (the current central section of which corresponds to Oliva Street), towards Ponte Caldelas (the central section of which corresponds to the current Joaquín Costa Street) and the road leading to Portugal was remodelled (the current Peregrina Street in its most central section). In the last quarter of the 19th century, as the population and built-up area increased, new cross streets were opened, such as García Camba Street, designed by Alejandro Sesmero between Peregrina Street and Oliva Street in 1884, Andrés Muruais Street in 1883, Andrés Mellado Street in 1885 and Sagasta Street between Peregrina Street and Benito Corbal Street in 1893. Similarly, in 1927, the opening of General Gutiérrez Mellado Street between Fernández Villaverde Street and Marquis de Riestra Street was almost entirely completed, providing a direct link between the old walled enclosure and the Palm Trees Park. In addition, work began on laying out the large areas that were to become three of the city's most important squares: in 1880, the España Square; in 1884, the Station Square (now the Galicia Square); and in 1900, the new fairground (now the Barcelos Square).

On 25 July 1888, Oliva and Michelena streets, in the first urban expansion zone, became the first in Galicia to have public lighting, thanks to the installation of electric arcs and incandescent lamps. Galicia's first electricity network was the work of the Marquis of Riestra, who built the first electricity production plant in the north-west of the Iberian Peninsula, in the Verdura Square, and in 1887 obtained a patent for a method of adjusting dynamos.

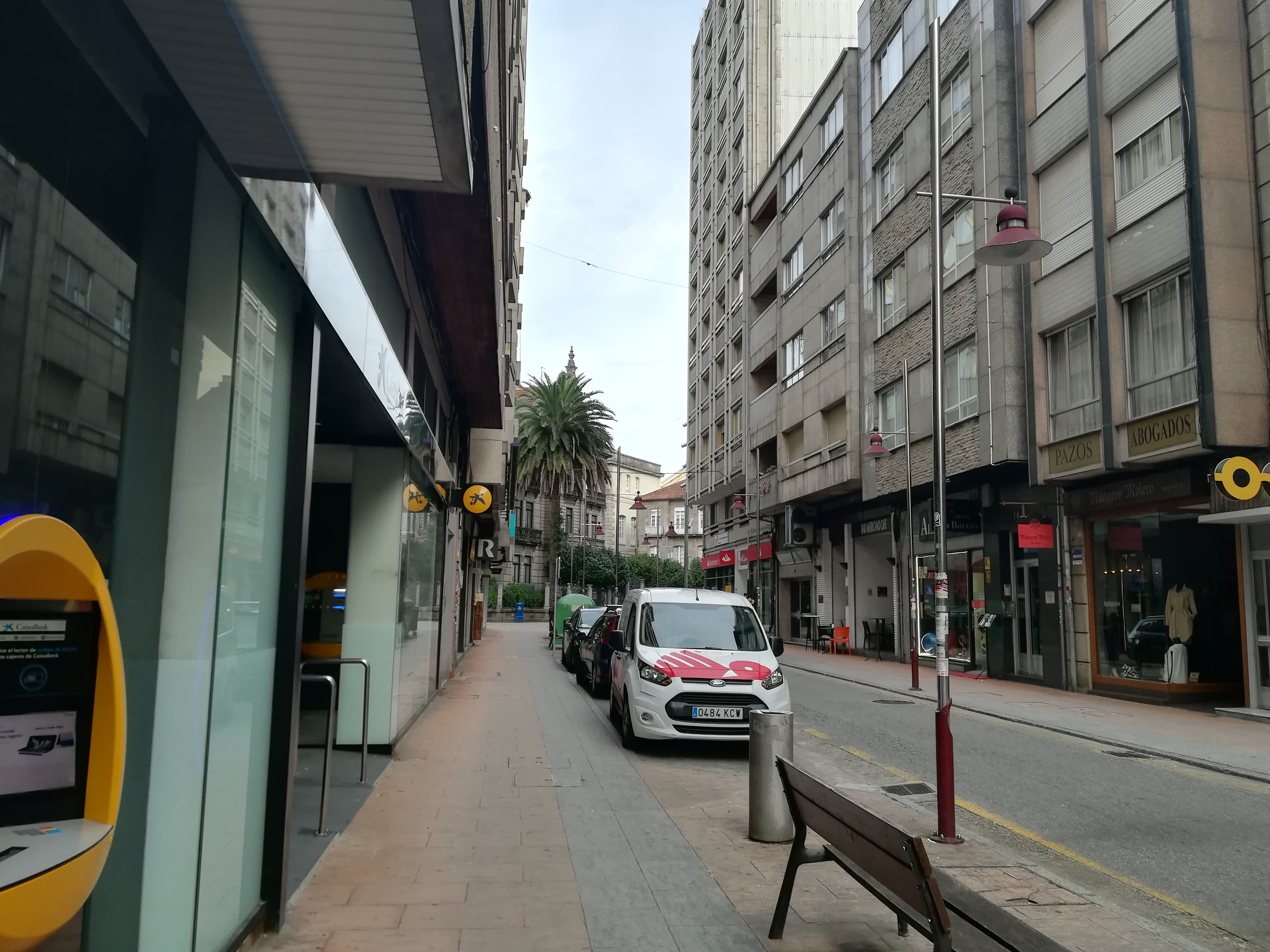
Marquis of Riestra Street.

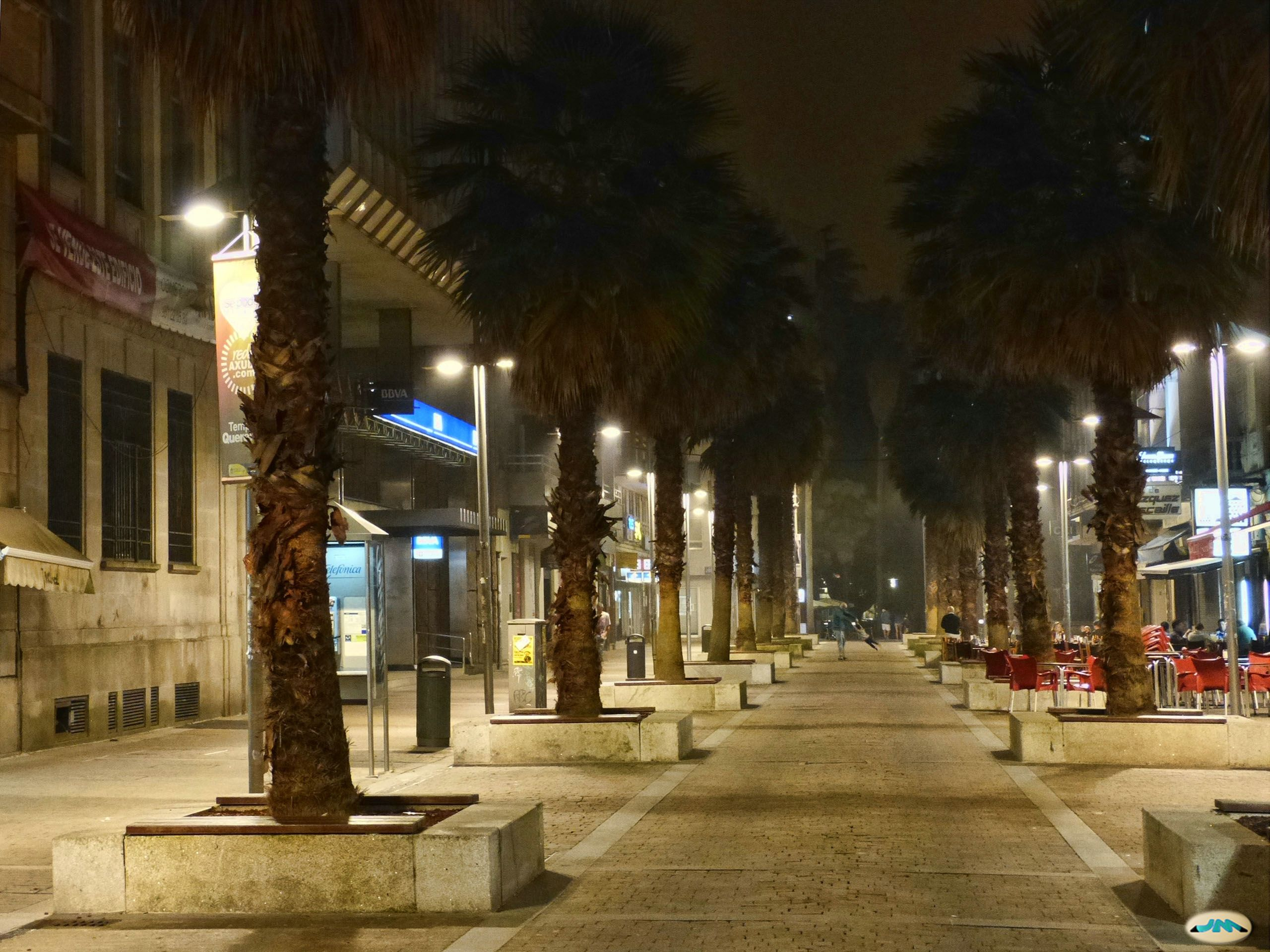
General Gutiérrez Mellado Street, with its night-time lighting and Californian fan palm trees.

In these new areas of Pontevedra's first expansion outside the city walls (the first Ensanche), buildings were constructed that, through their forms and functions, reinforced the bourgeois project of restoration, faithful representatives of the new Pontevedra, such as the Mansion of the Marquis of Riestra. In 1902, construction of the Café Moderno in Saint Joseph's Square was completed; in 1903, construction of the new Bank of Spain building in Michelena Street; in 1905, construction of the Villa Pilar mansion on the left-hand side of Marquis de Riestra Street (with a rear façade overlooking the Palm Trees Park); in 1915, the Gran Garaje Building in Benito Corbal Street; and between 1915 and 1926, construction of the Post and Telegraph headquarters in García Camba Street.

Part of Pontevedra's bourgeoisie settled in this first Ensanche, giving rise to a number of Art Nouveau buildings (such as the Palace Hotel, built in 1914 on the corner of today's Galicia Square and Andrés Muruais Street), many of which were demolished in the 1970s and 1980s as a result of real estate speculation in the city.

In 1944, municipal architect Juan Argenti Navajas designed a project to extend García Camba Street, which was never built.

Between 1950 and 1970, the city's second expansion took place with the opening of new streets to the east, with the boundaries marked by Daniel de la Sota Street, opened in 1958, Cobián Roffignac Street to the east and Joaquín Costa Street to the south.

From 2000 onwards, a major urban regeneration programme was carried out in Ensanche to achieve a high level of urban quality, with a large number of the area's streets (including Michelena, Peregrina, Benito Corbal, Marquis of Riestra, General Gutiérrez Mellado, Daniel de la Sota, Lepanto and España Square) being pedestrianised in whole or in part, the widening of pavements in streets such as Sagasta or Fray Juan de Navarrete, the planting of trees (Californian Fan Palms, sophoras, Callery pear trees, apple trees, Chinese magnolias or plum trees, among others) and the considerable improvement of night-time lighting with design elements such as street lamps, spotlights, LED beacons, luminaires and LED modules.

== Urban planning ==
The Ensanche de Pontevedra is the central and commercial area of the city, extending to the south and east of the old town. It is configured as a continuation of the existing city, adapting and relating to the old urban fabric. The streets are between 12 and 24 metres wide. It corresponds to the urban extension of the streets laid out along the main communication arteries (Orense, Tuy and Portugal, Marín) and the streets running across them.

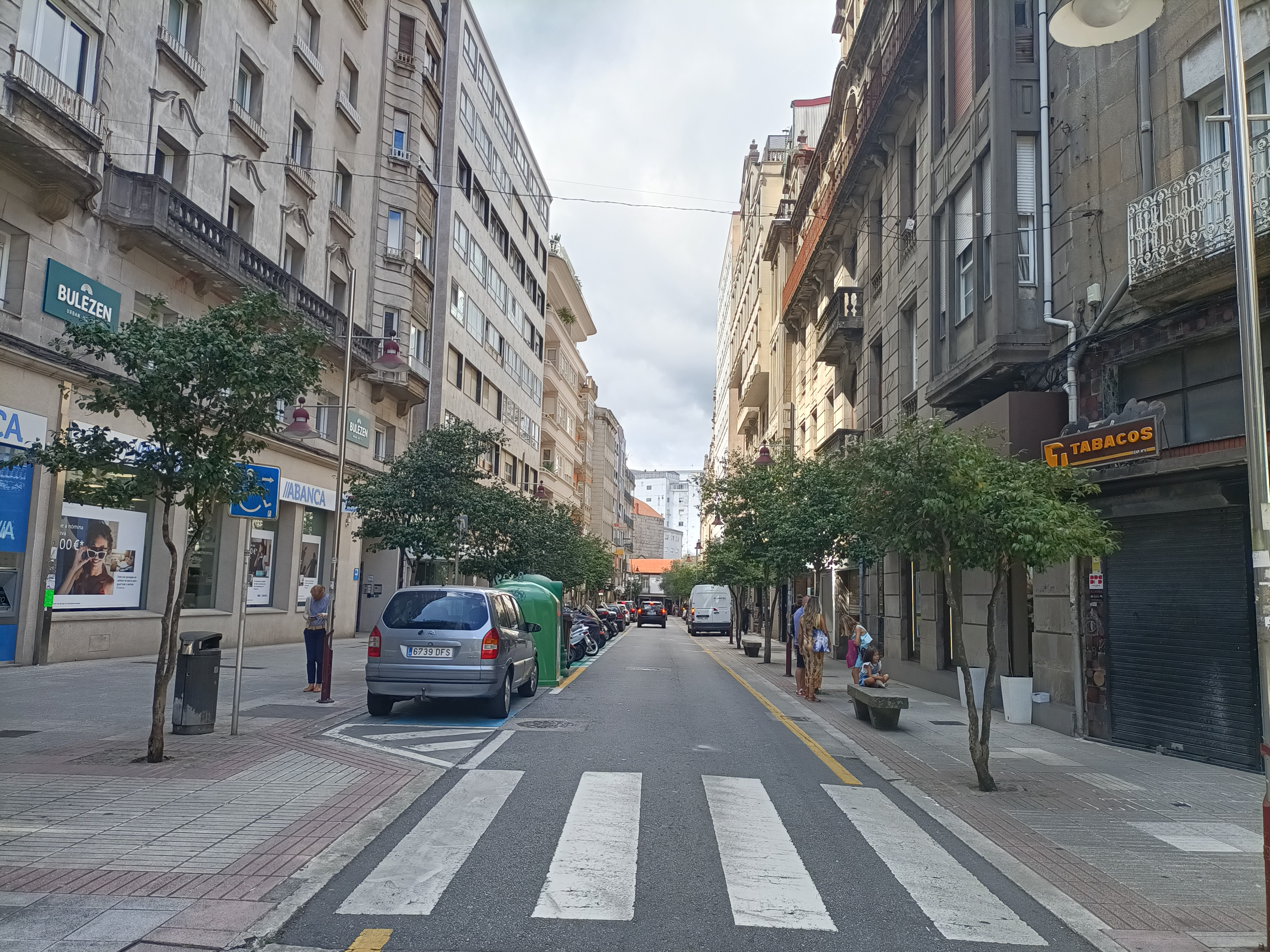
García Camba Street.

The Ensanche, which corresponds to today's city centre, is built around the major streets of Oliva, Peregrina and Benito Corbal, whose former name, Progreso Street, indicated its role as a place of expansion and progress for the city. The first Ensanche, before the 1950s, is framed by the range described by Marquis de Riestra, Augusto González Besada, Andrés Mellado and Sagasta streets, bounded to the north by Michelena and Benito Corbal streets. The former neighbourhoods of Saint Joseph (around what is now Saint Joseph's Square) and Peregrina and Virgen del Camino (around the confluence of what are now Sagasta and Fray Juan de Navarrete streets), consolidated in a linear way in the last third of the 19th century around the Marín, Portugal and Ponte Caldelas roads, were included in this area. This area is a transitional space between the old medieval town and the later expansion of the 1950s. From the stone houses on Michelena, Marquis de Riestra and Oliva streets, built in the traditional style with balconies and galleries, there is a transition to a different Art Nouveau and rationalist style with four and five floors on García Camba street, with buildings such as the González Vega building designed in 1939 by the architect Eloy Maquieira.

The late 19th-century bourgeois Ensanche to the west of the old town is built around the Gran Vía de Montero Ríos and the España Square, following the axis of the Alameda de Pontevedra and the Palm Trees Park, the most important green spaces in the city centre. Other green spaces in Ensanche include the Doctor Marescot Gardens, Barcelos Square and Galicia Square, which serves as a transition between Ensanche and the Campolongo neighbourhood.

== Services ==
=== Government departments ===
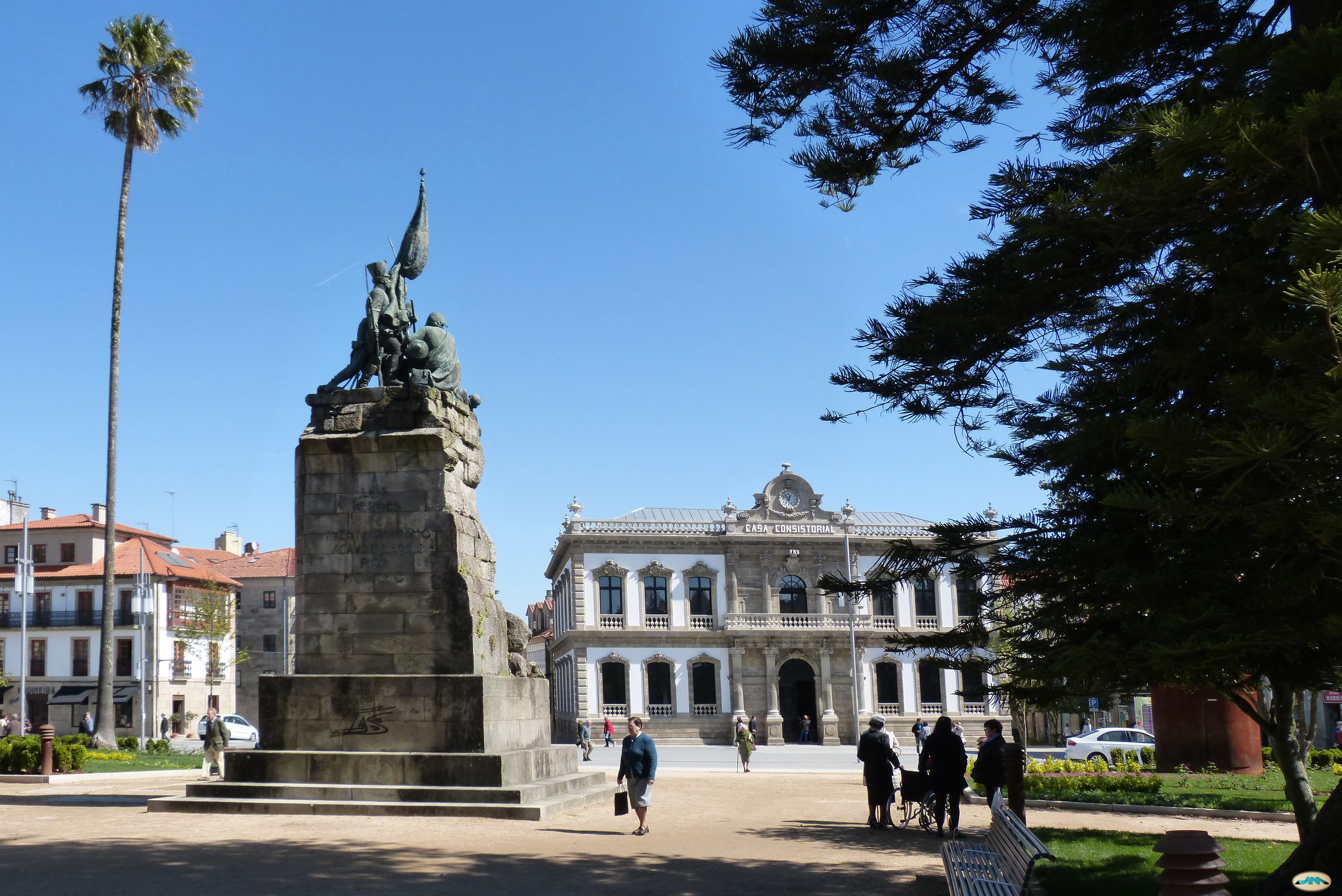
España Square.

In the España Square, the Pontevedra City Hall is an eclectic, Parisian-inspired building designed by the architect Alejandro Sesmero and inaugurated in August 1880, while the headquarters of the Pontevedra Government Branch are housed in a building inaugurated in 1958.

On Gran Vía de Montero Ríos are the provincial headquarters of the Pontevedra Provincial Council: the Palace of the Pontevedra Provincial Council, inaugurated in 1890, and the administrative building of the Pontevedra Provincial Council, inaugurated in 1901.

The administrative headquarters of Pontevedra City Council are located in the former Mansion of the Marquis of Riestra and the headquarters of the peripheral offices of the State Administration are located in the former Bank of Spain Building.

Between Oliva and García Camba streets is the city's Post Office and the provincial headquarters of the Pontevedra Post Office. Benito Corbal Street is home to one of the city's Xunta de Galicia buildings, which for the last two decades of the 20th century was its main headquarters in Pontevedra. In 2019, it was completely refurbished, adopting its characteristic blue exterior.

The provincial headquarters of the Pontevedra police station is located in Joaquín Costa Street.

=== Education ===
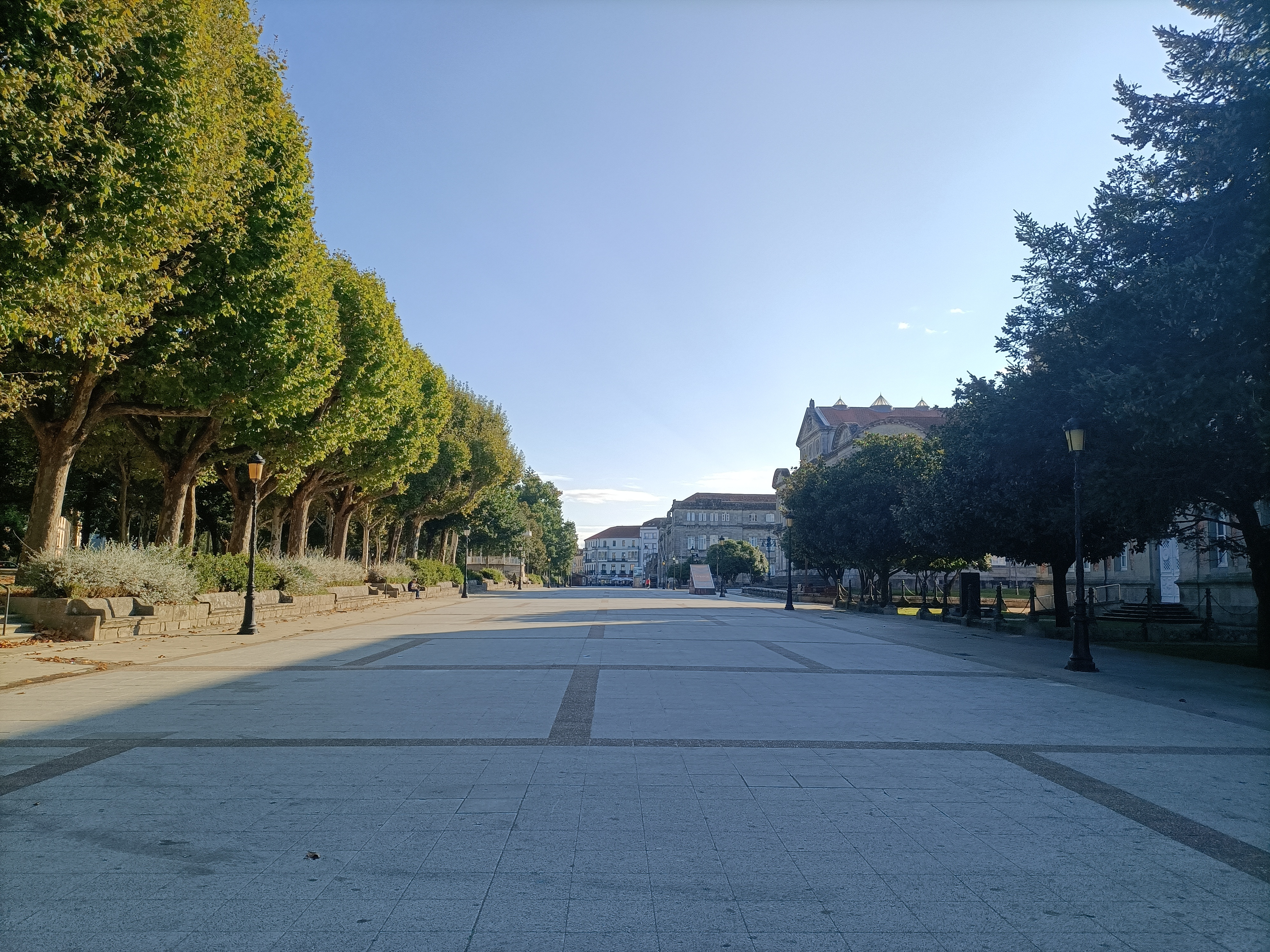
Gran Vía de Montero Ríos.

In Maestranza street, opposite the Doctor Marescot gardens, is the Pontevedra Fine Arts Faculty, housed in the former Saint Ferdinand barracks, a large neo-classical building completed in 1909. Pontevedra's Faculty of Design is located in Benito Corbal Street.

On Gran Vía de Montero Ríos stands the Valle-Inclán high school building, inaugurated in 1927 and until then the provincial high school of Pontevedra.

=== Health centres ===
The Quirónsalud Miguel Domínguez hospital is located between Fray Juan de Navarrete and Castelao streets. In Maestranza street is the Virgen Peregrina health centre, whose building, designed by the architect Alfonso Barreiro Buján, was inaugurated in 1963.

At the end of Benito Corbal Street, at number 2 Doctor Loureiro Crespo Street, is the Pontevedra Provincial Hospital, inaugurated in 1897 at the end of the old Progreso Street, the main axis of Pontevedra's expansion at the time.

=== Shops and restaurants ===
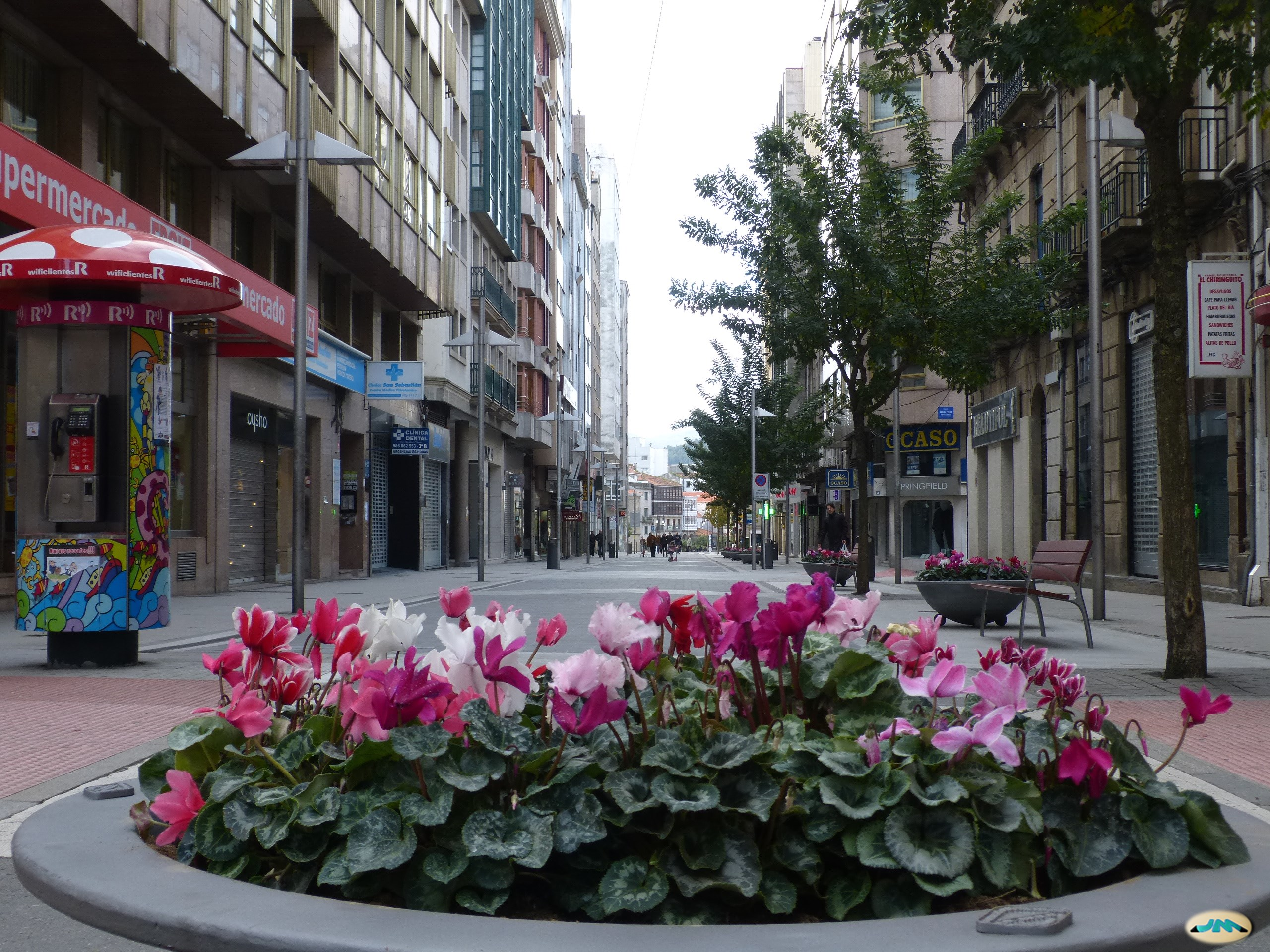
Benito Corbal Street.

The streets of Ensanche are the epicentre of Pontevedra's many commercial establishments, including Spanish and international franchises and local shops, with Benito Corbal street being known as the "golden mile". Ensanche is also home to a large number of restaurants.

=== Other facilities ===
The city's largest underground car park is in Barcelos Square, with 906 parking spaces. España Square and Gran Vía de Montero Ríos are home to two other underground car parks with capacity for 326 and 376 vehicles respectively.

== Gallery ==
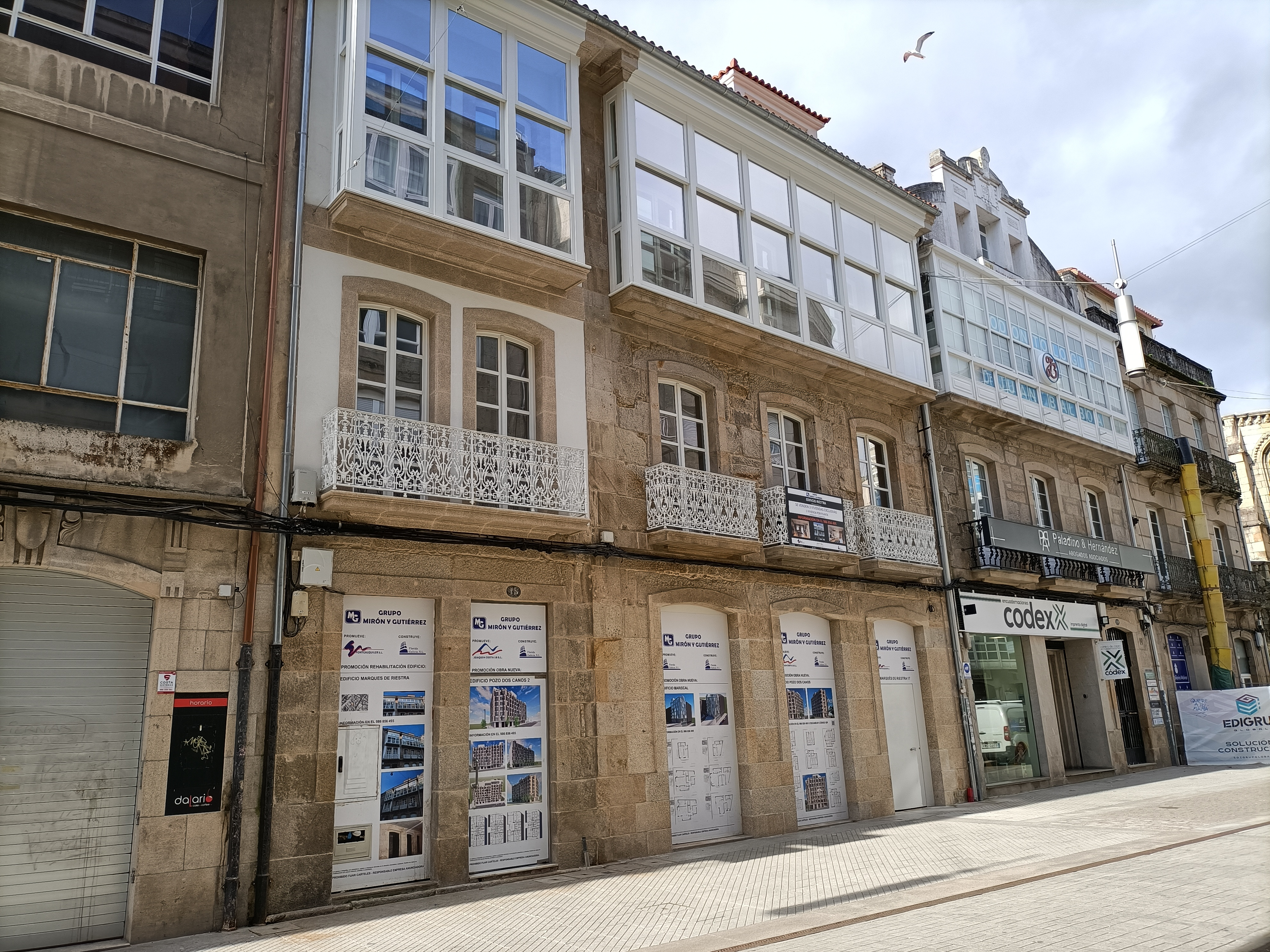
Houses of the 19th century in Marquis de Riestra Street

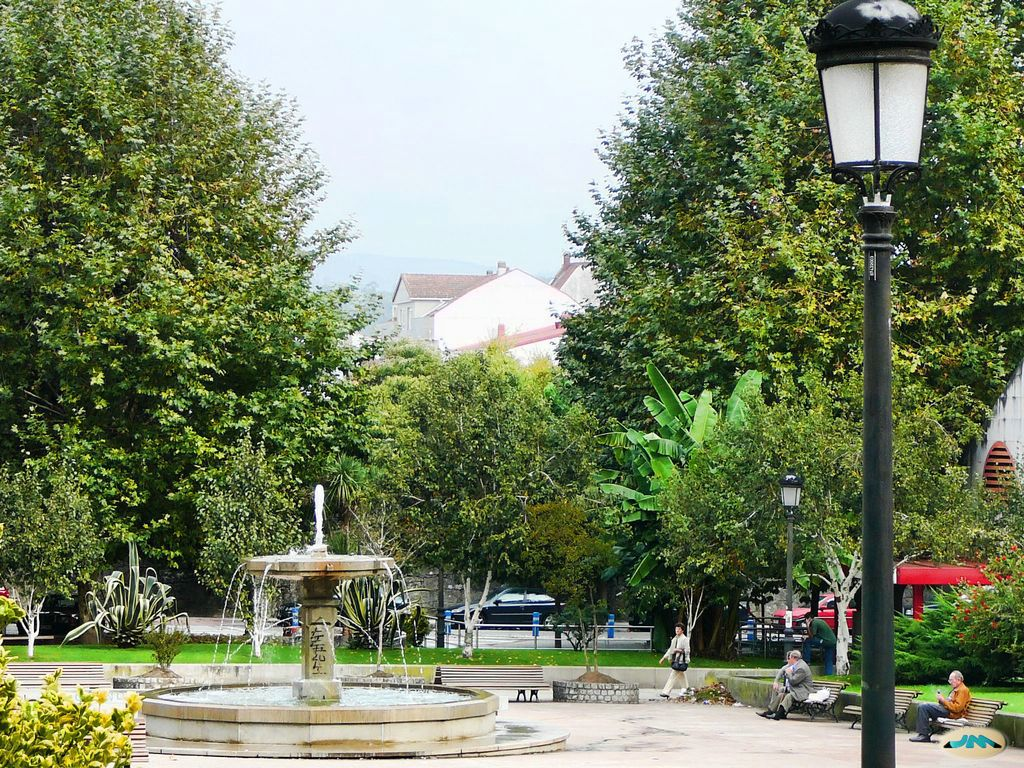
Barcelos Square

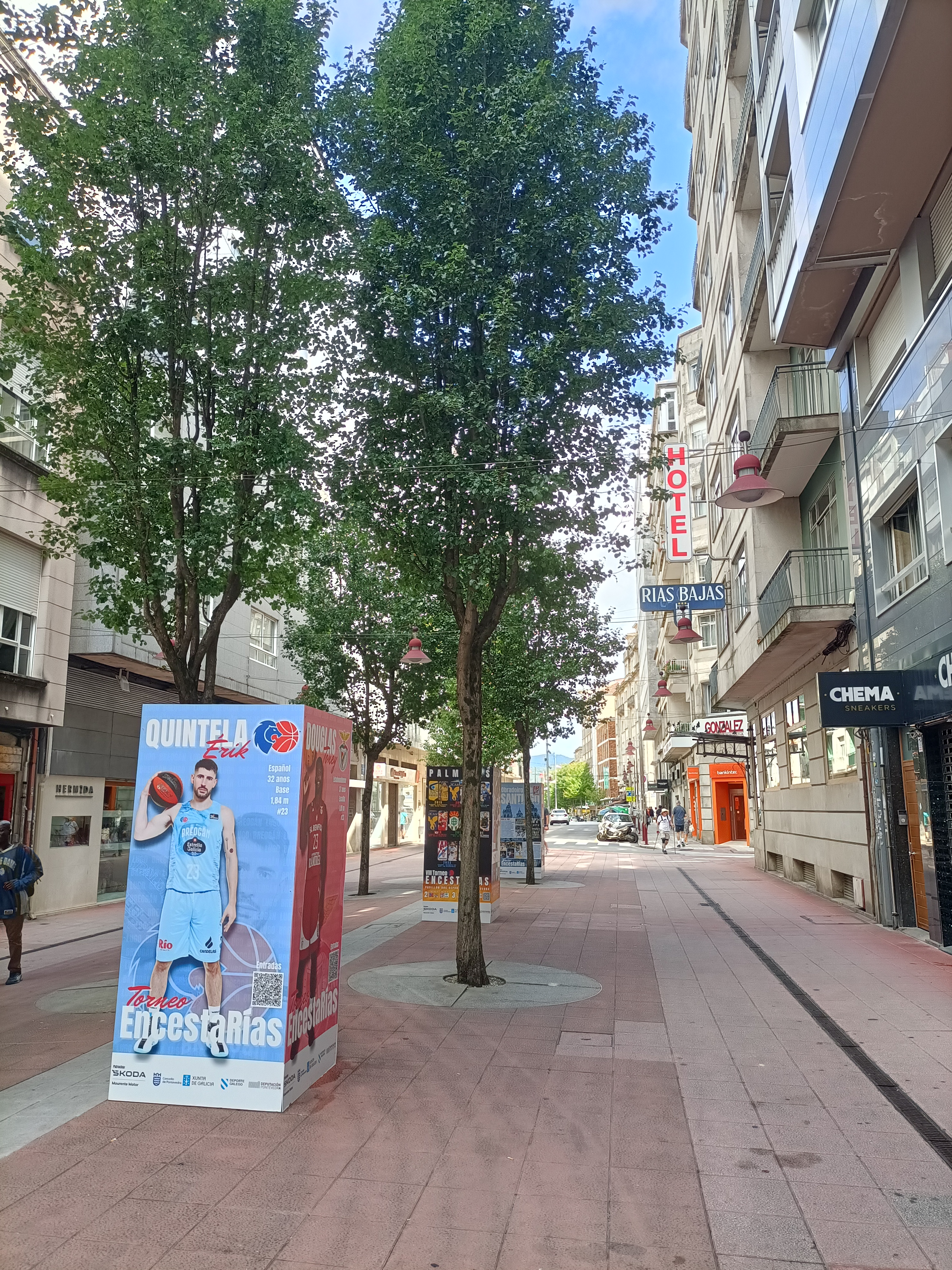
Daniel de la Sota Street

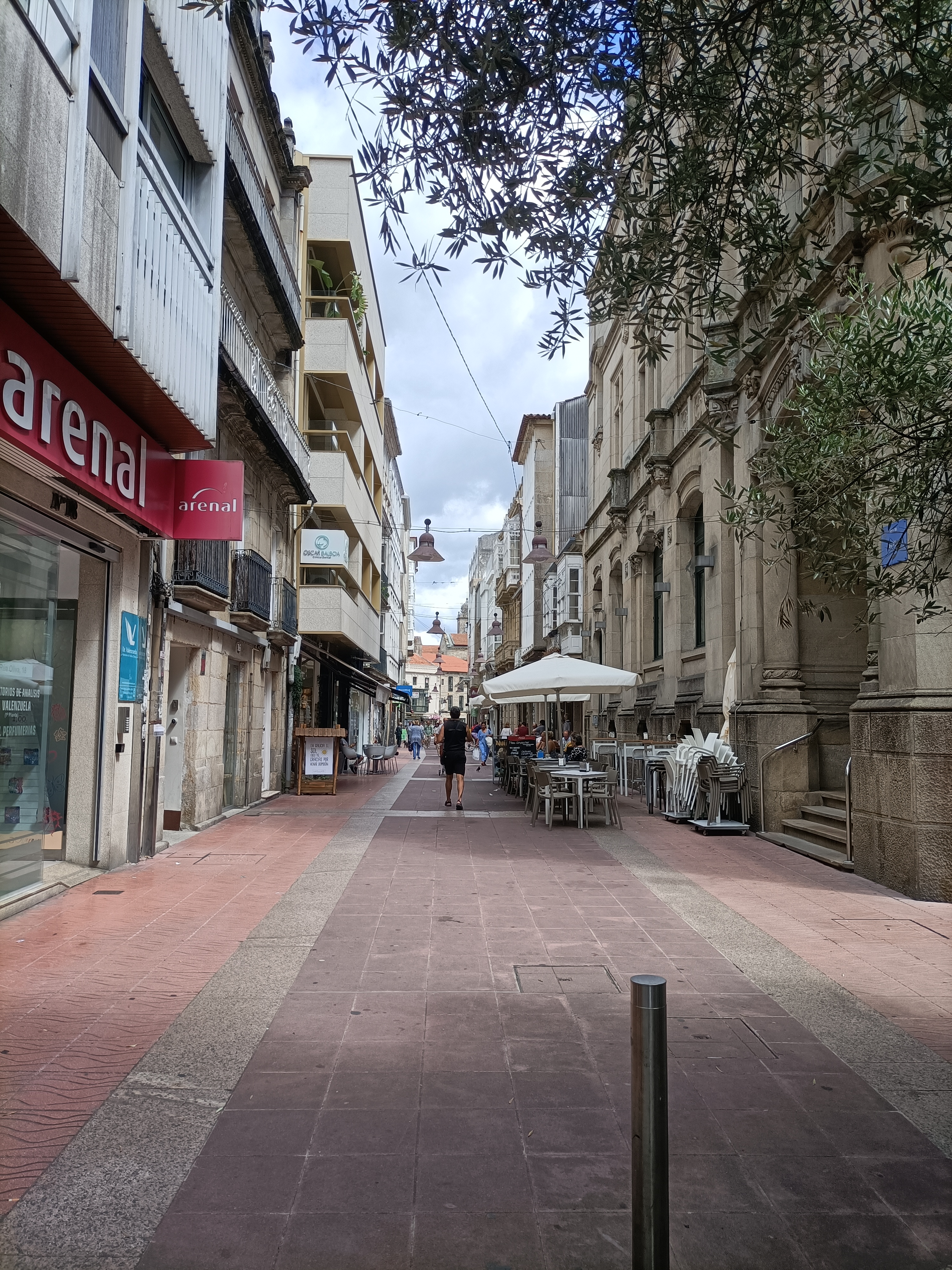
Oliva Square

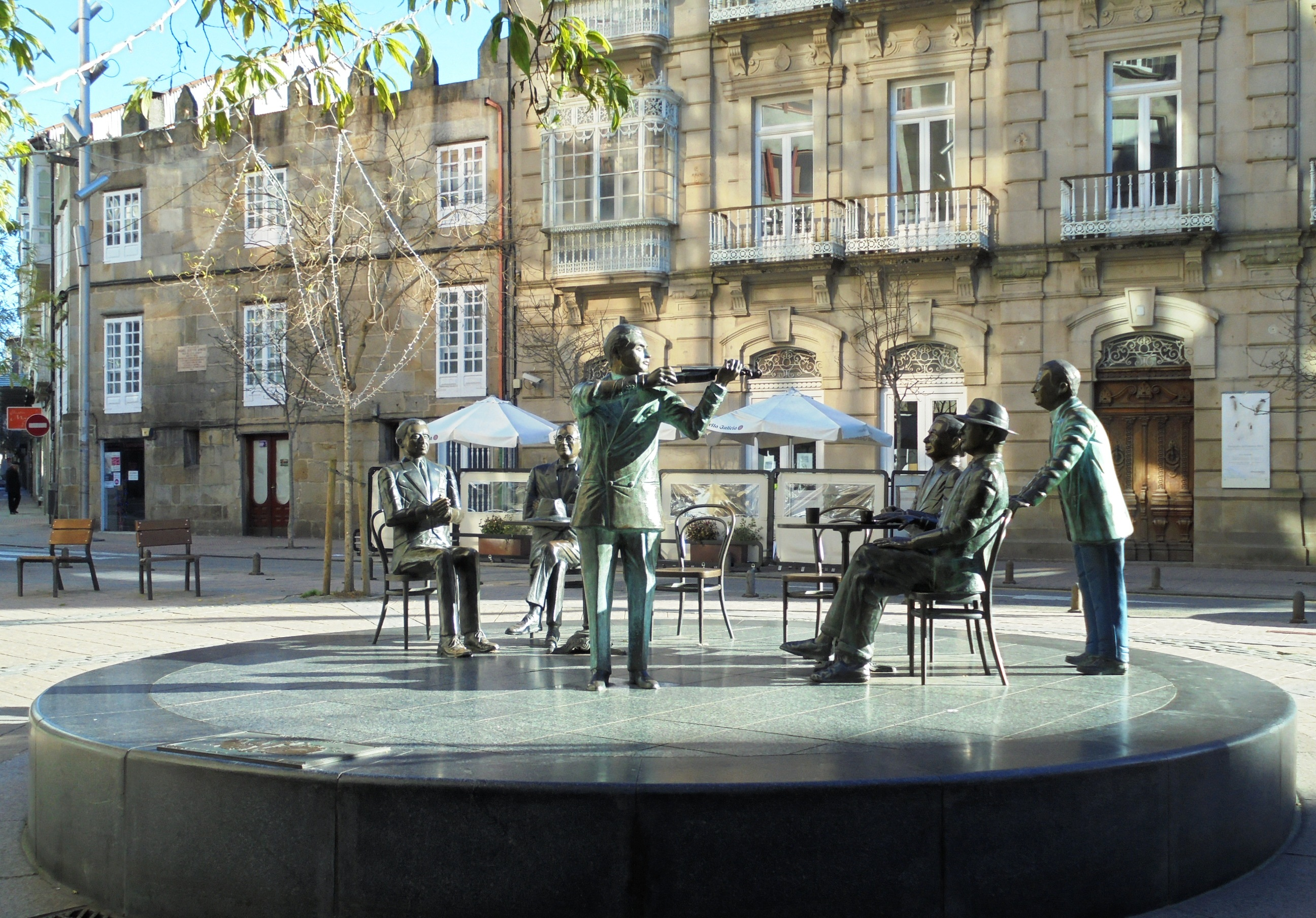
Saint Joseph Square

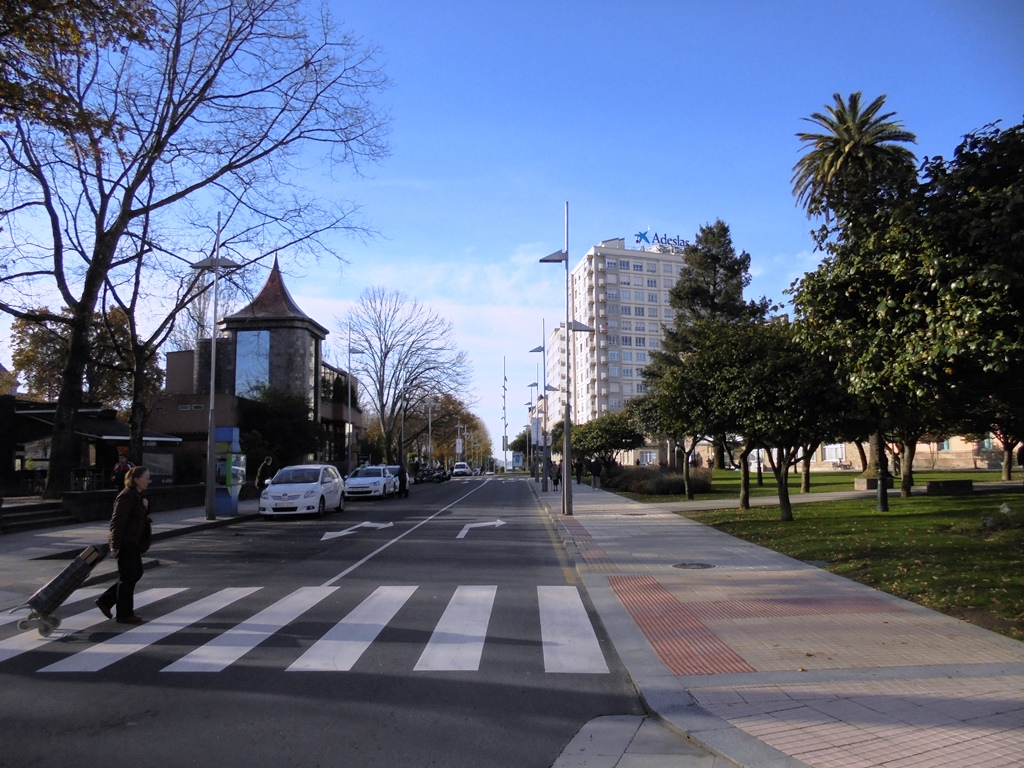
Alameda Street

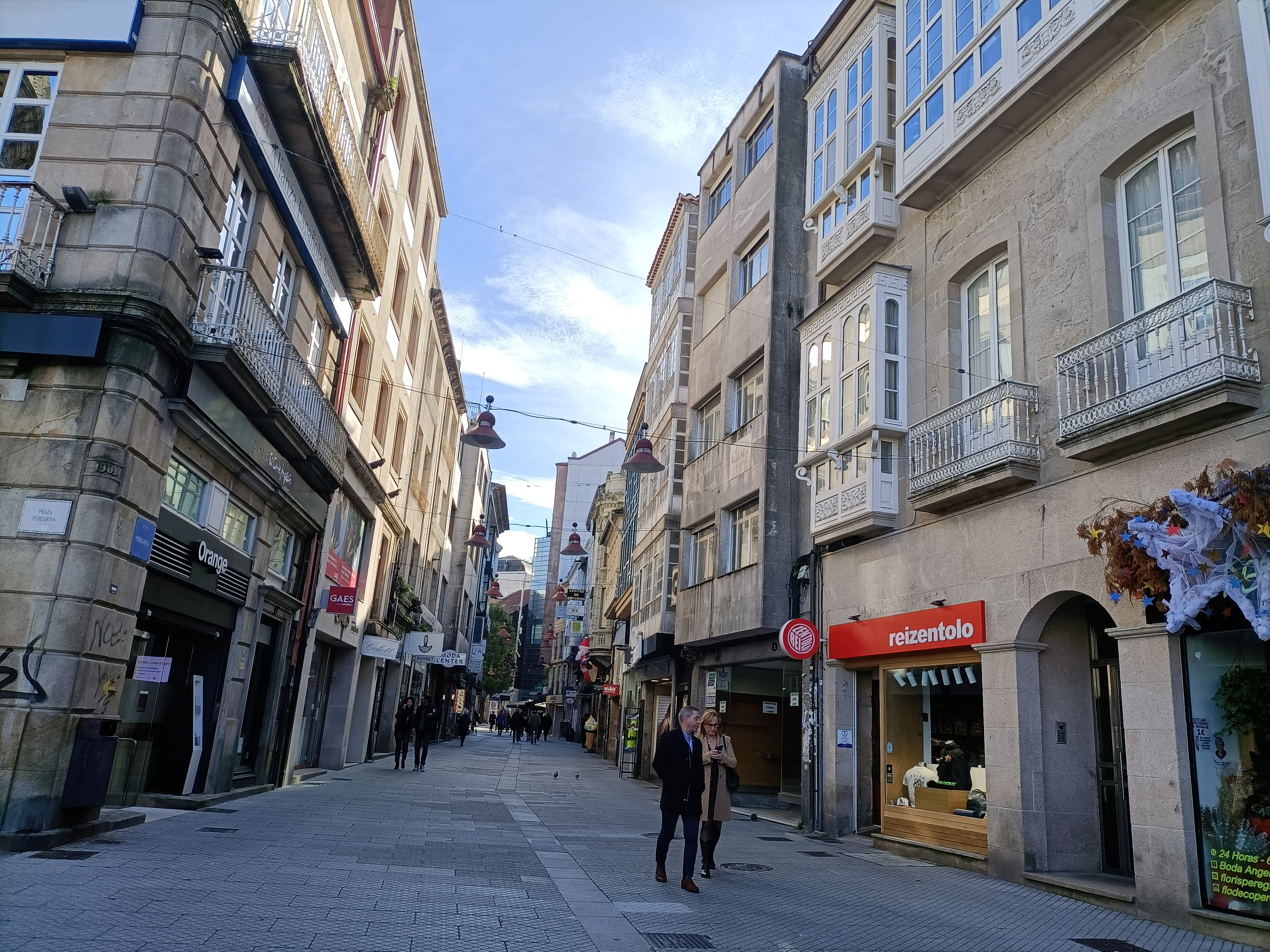
Peregrina Street

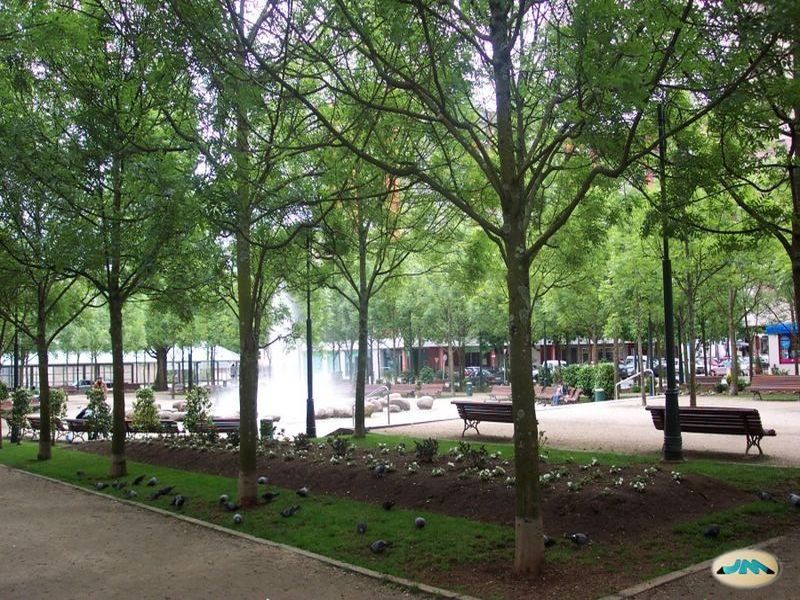
Galicia Square

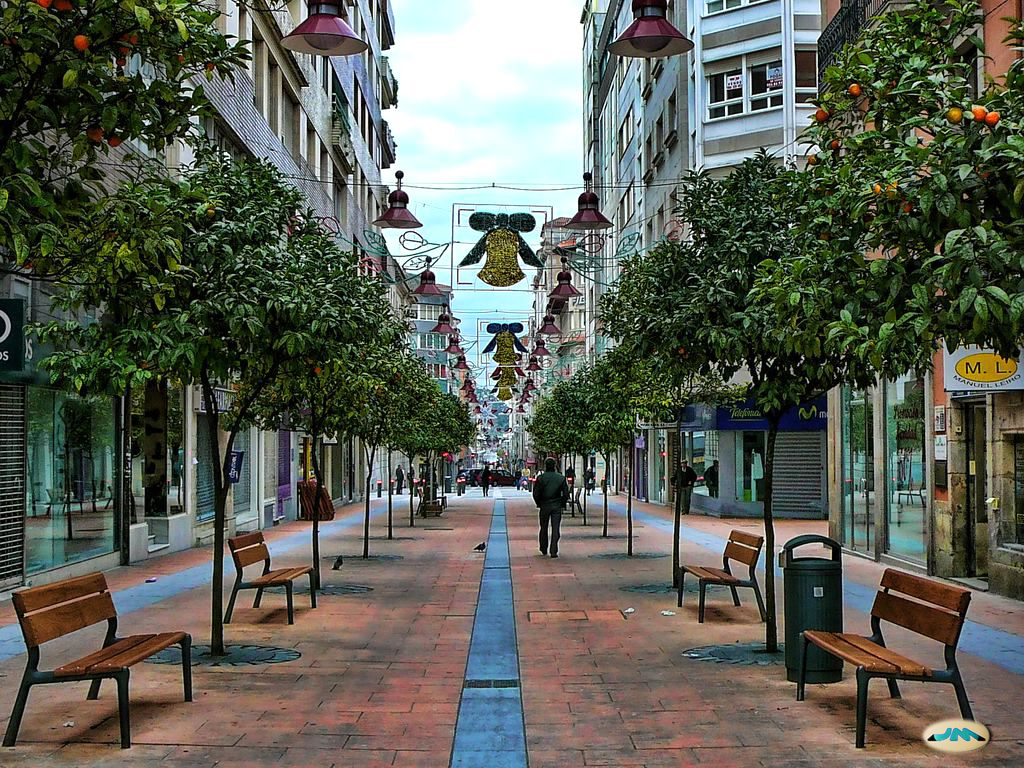
Rosalía de Castro Street

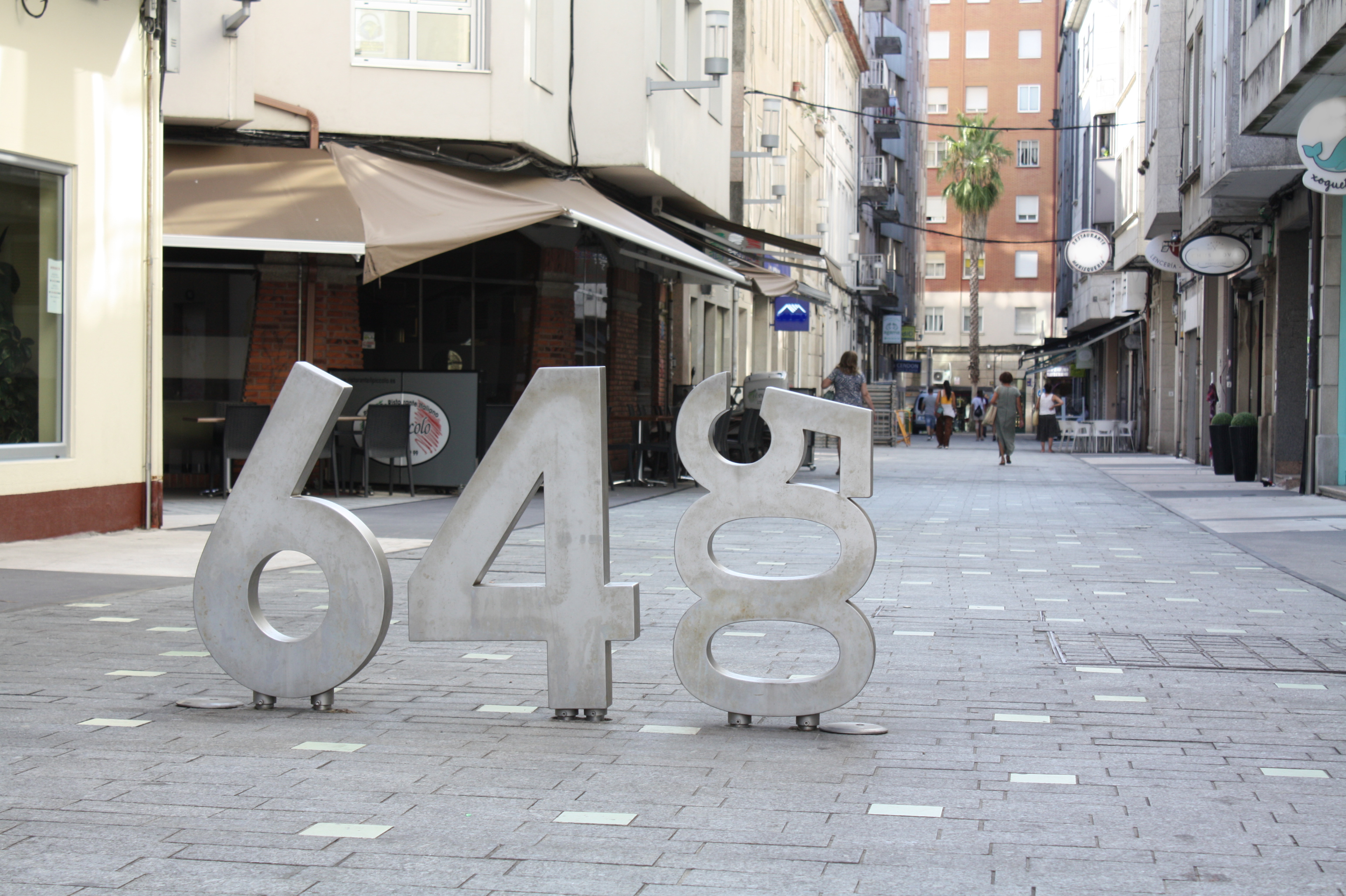
Virgen del Camino Street

== See also ==
=== Bibliography ===
- Abelleira Doldán, Miguel (2018). "La Arquitectura Institucional política en Galicia durante la autarquía". Revista do Departamento de Historia da Arte Quintana USC (in Spanish) (16): 126–132. ISSN 2340-0005.
- Aganzo, Carlos (2010). Pontevedra. Ciudades con encanto (in Spanish). Madrid: El País-Aguilar. p. 21; 25; 34; 91–92; 98; 101. ISBN 978-8403509344.
- Caeiro González, Eugenio (1993). Pontevedra. Galicia pueblo a pueblo (in Spanish). A Coruña: La Voz de Galicia. p. 1116. ISBN 978-8488254245.
- Durán Villa, Francisco (2000). Provincia de Pontevedra (in Spanish). Madrid: Mediterráneo. p. 88; 96. ISBN 8471563371.
- Fontoira Surís, Rafael (2009). Pontevedra monumental (in Galician). Pontevedra: Diputación de Pontevedra. p. 407; 438. ISBN 9788484573272.
- Fortes Bouzán, Xosé (2011). Pontevedra. Burgo, villa, capital (in Spanish). Brión (A Coruña): Giverny. p. 448; 456. ISBN 978-84-939449-1-9.
- González Clavijo, Pepy (2008). Las calles de Pontevedra (in Spanish). Pontevedra: Diputación de Pontevedra. p. 18. ISBN 978-84-8457-312-8.
- Juega Puig, Juan (2000). As rúas de Pontevedra (in Galician). Pontevedra: Diputación de Pontevedra. pp. 92–93. ISBN 84-8457-044-4.
- Moreno Arana, José Manuel (2017). "El edificio de la antigua sucursal del Banco de Espana en Jerez de la Frontera obra de Jose de Astiz y Barcena". Boletín de Arte Universidad de Málaga (in Spanish) (37): 261–266. doi:10.24310/BoLArte.2016.v0i37.3427. ISSN 0211-8483.
- Rodríguez Mouriño, Matías G. (2020). "Algunas notas acerca de Villa Pilar: una arquitectura indiana en la Pontevedra de la Restauración". Arte y ciudad. Revista de Investigación (in Spanish) (17): 117–142. ISSN 2254-2930.

=== Related articles ===
- Benito Corbal Street
- Glorieta de Compostela
- Michelena Street
- Oliva Street
- García Camba Street
- Marquis de Riestra Street

=== External links ===
- Ensanche de Pontevedra on the website Visit-Pontevedra
