= Plaza de Galicia =

Square in Pontevedra, Spain

Galicia square
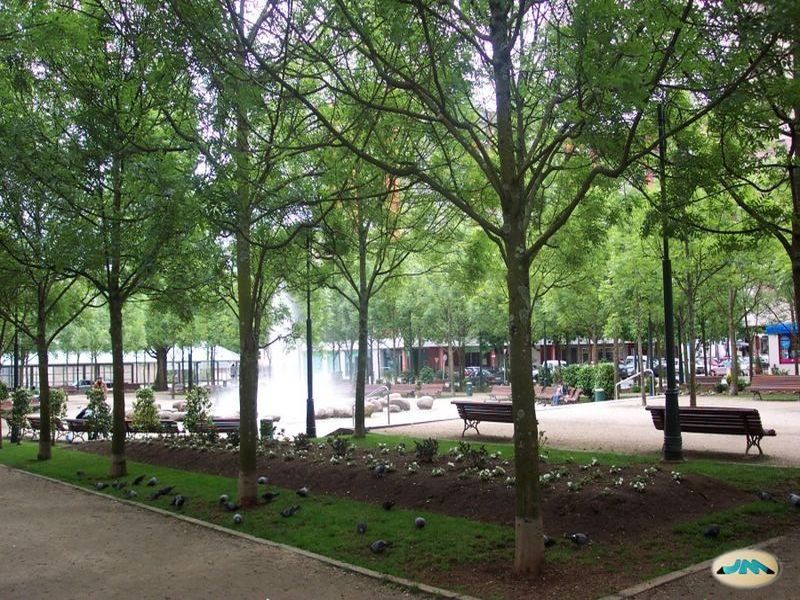
- Galicia square
- Native name: Plaza de Galicia (Spanish)
- Type: plaza
- Maintained by: Pontevedra City Council
- Location: Pontevedra, Spain
- Postal code: 36001
- Coordinates: 42.428321°N 8.644344°W

Construction
- Completion: 1991

Other
- Designer: José Martínez Sarandeses

The Plaza de Galicia is a 20th century square located in the city centre of Pontevedra (Spain), on the edge of the Campolongo neighbourhood.

== Origin of the name ==
The square is named after Galicia, the region in the northwest of Spain in which Pontevedra is located.

== History ==
The origin of the Plaza de Galicia is a public space at the end of Augusto González Besada, Andrés Muruais and Andrés Mellado streets and in front of the old Pontevedra railway station, which started operating on 16 May 1884, when the first locomotive arrived in the city. This space was known as the station square. In 1890 the engineer Juan María León Domercq y Alzúa had his emblematic villa built on the corner of the square and Augusto González Besada Street, which was demolished in the mid-1980s.

With the large number of travellers arriving in the square, in 1914 the Palace Hotel was built on the corner of Plaza de Galicia and Andrés Muruais Street, a large Art Nouveau building with four floors and an attic designed by the architect Andrés López de Ocáriz Robledo, which provided accommodation for travellers arriving in the city and which was demolished in the late 1970s.

In 1966, the old railway station in the square was disused after the construction of the new Pontevedra railway station in the Gorgullón neighbourhood, further from the city centre, and was demolished in 1969.

In 1971, the square was enlarged, taking advantage of the space vacated by the old station, and two shelters were provided for the stops of the trolleybus that crossed the city. The square, entirely dedicated to traffic, remained in this layout until 1988, when the trolleybus lines were abolished.

In 1991, the shelters and traffic lanes that divided the square were removed and the square was enlarged and completely redesigned by the architect José Martínez Sarandeses with the collaboration of the architects María Agustina Herrero Malina and Fernando Martínez Sarandeses and the landscape architect María Medina Muro. This redevelopment improved the quality of the environment and reduced traffic congestion. The current appearance of the square dates from this period.

== Description ==
The square has a rectangular shape and an area of 5,800 square metres. Augusto García Sánchez Avenue and Agusto González Besada, Andrés Muruais and Andrés Mellado streets converge here.

The square is laid out as a garden square. It is a tree-lined square that bisects Augusto García Sánchez Avenue and is bordered by two one-way traffic lanes. The north, west and east sides are delimited by buildings and the south side opens onto the Campolongo neighbourhood and is delimited by a large central bus shelter with ten benches and a glass back panel.

The central pedestrian garden square is a very distinctive space, planted with ornamental ash trees of Dutch origin and equipped with numerous benches. The square consists of four peripheral alleys, each with two rows of ash trees, bordered by flowerbeds and lawns. A fifth alley, coinciding with the west-east axis of the square, connects the northern pavements of the two sections into which Augusto García Sánchez Avenue has been divided.

At the centre of the garden square is a circular central area with benches that facilitate seclusion. In the centre of this space is an ornamental fountain with sprinklers embedded in the ground that spray water and which is surrounded by granite blocks grouped in seven sets that evoke the stars of the Galician coat of arms and refer to the name of the square.

== Gallery ==
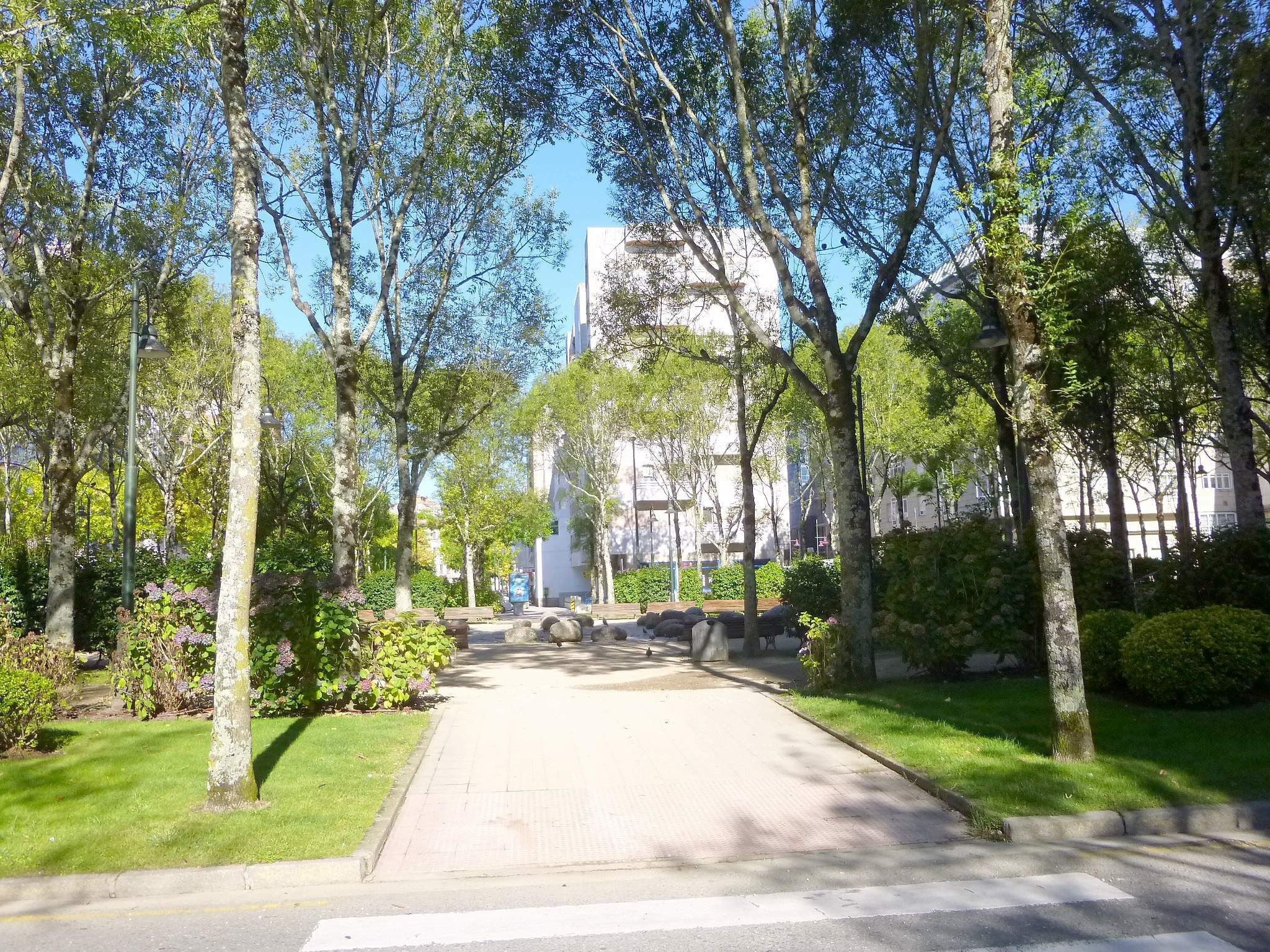
Alley in the garden square

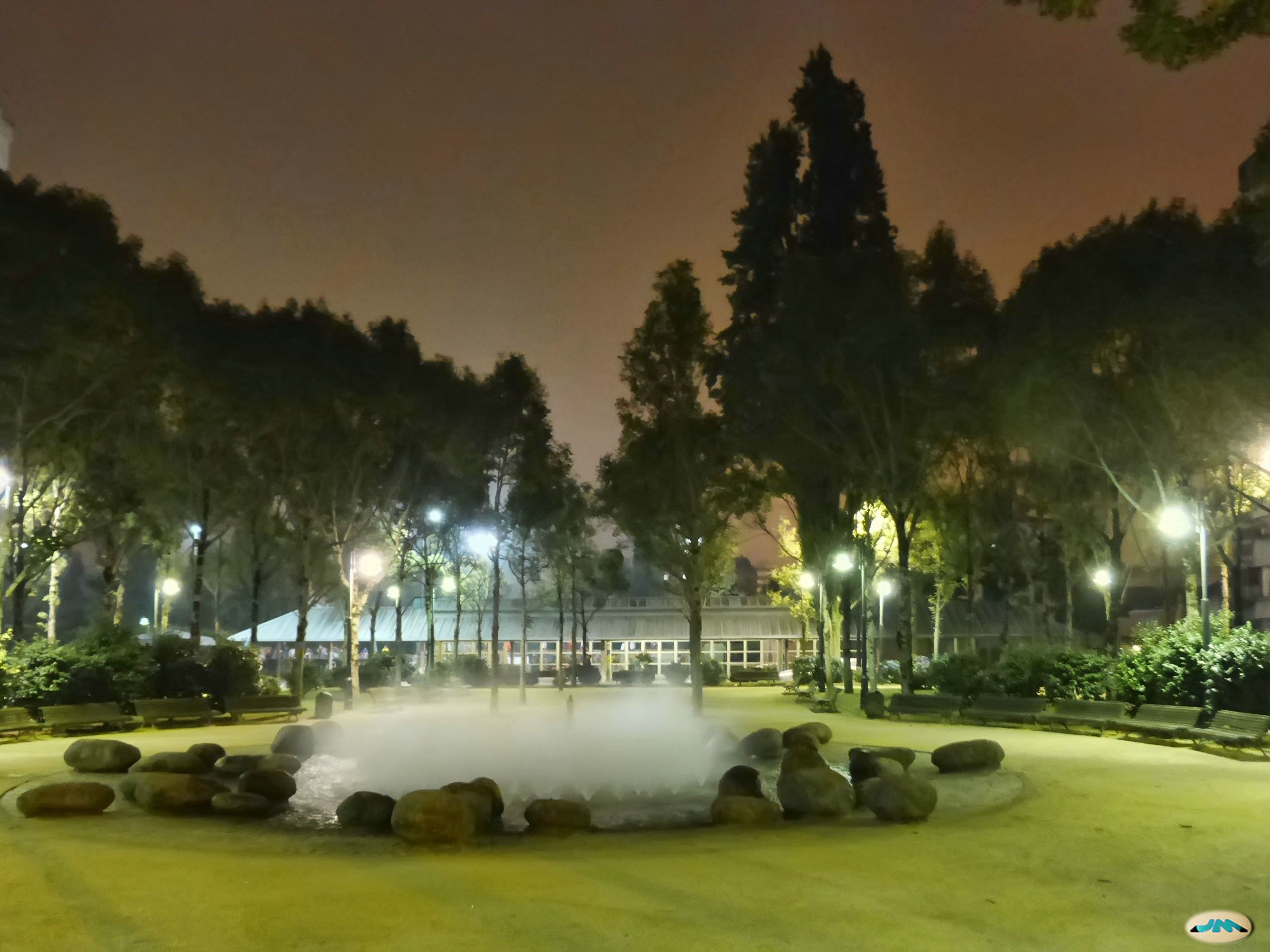
Fountain in the square

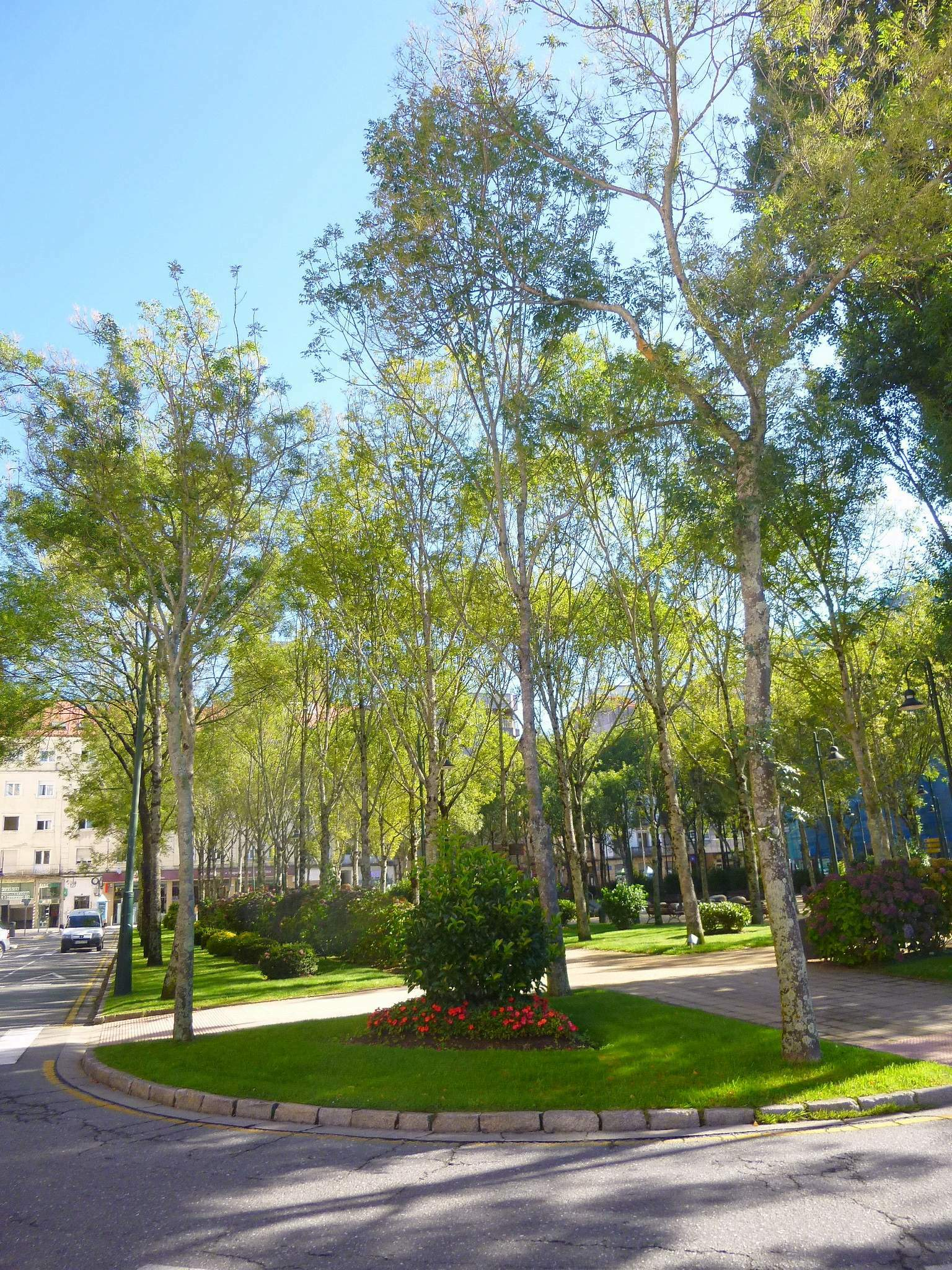
Garden of the square

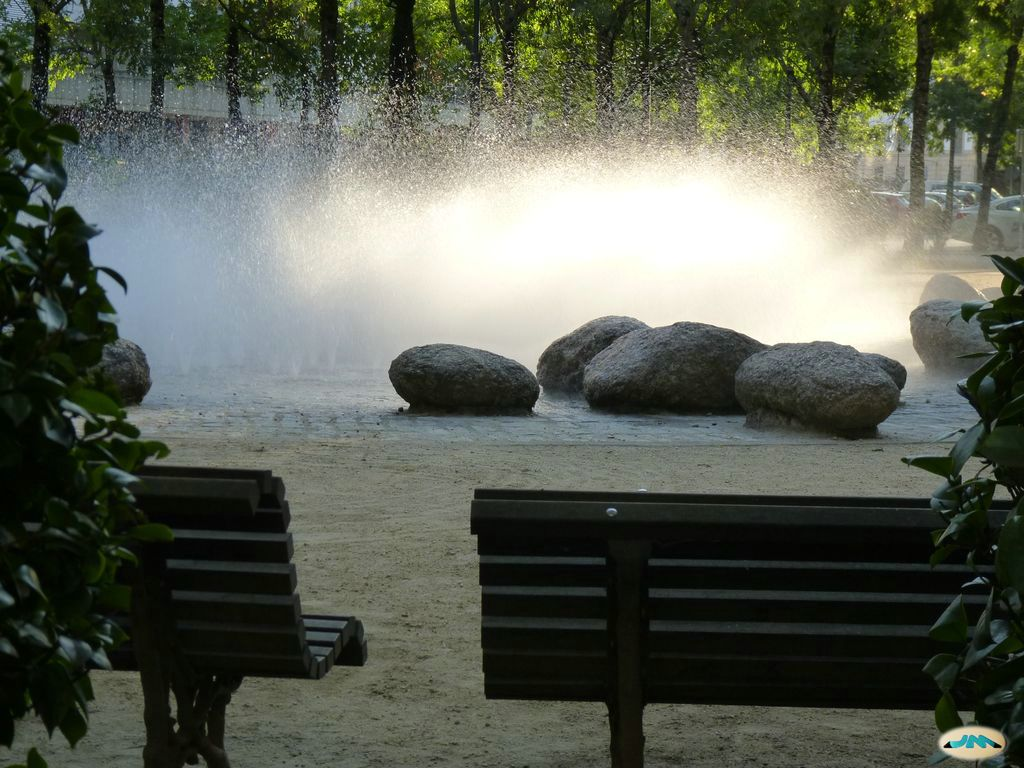
Benches in the square

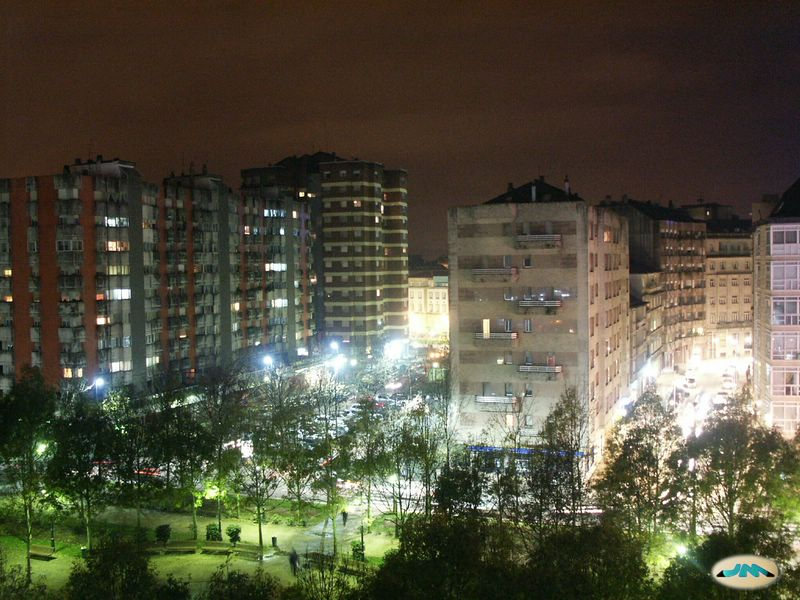
The square, at night

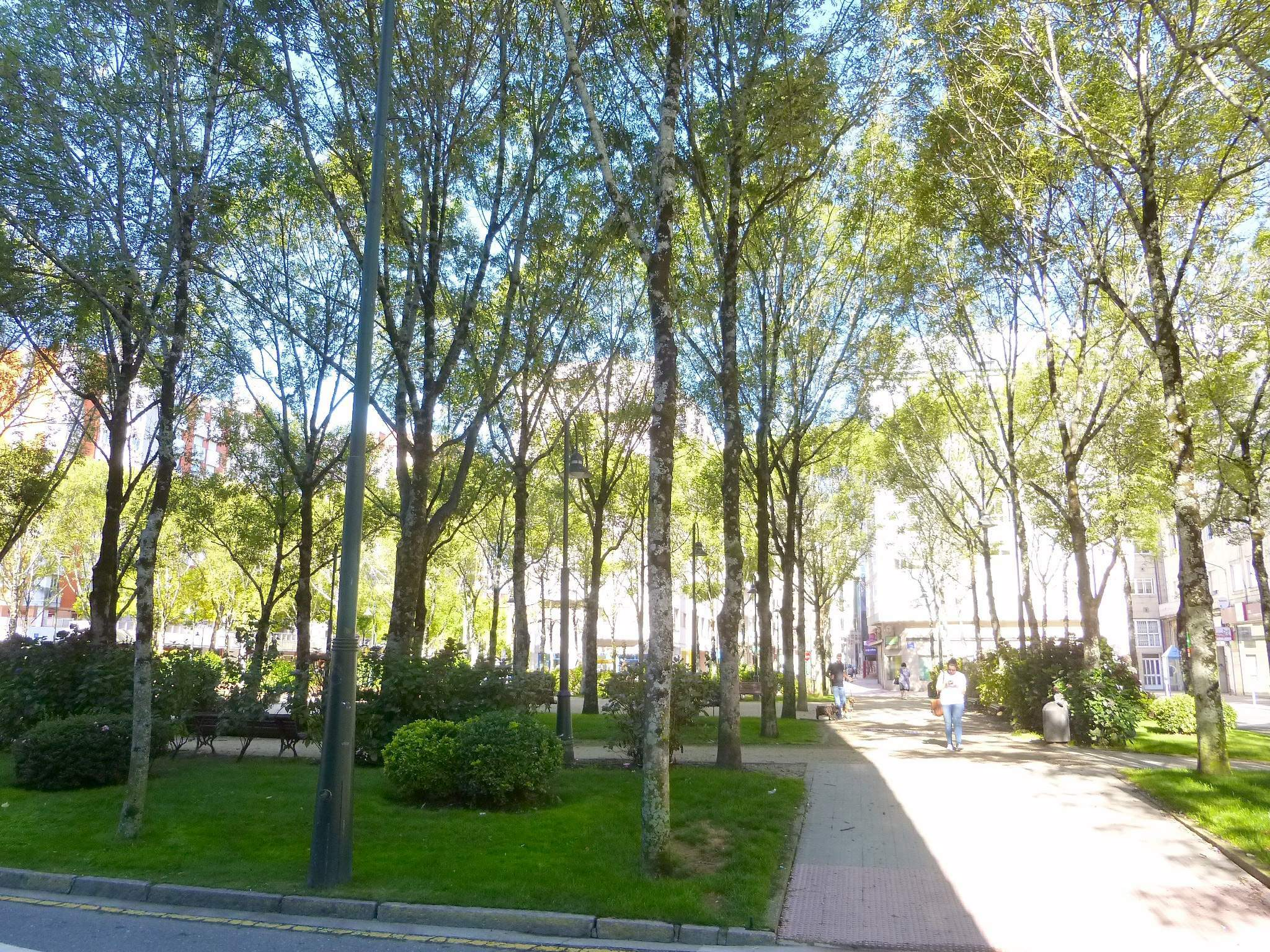
Ash trees in the square

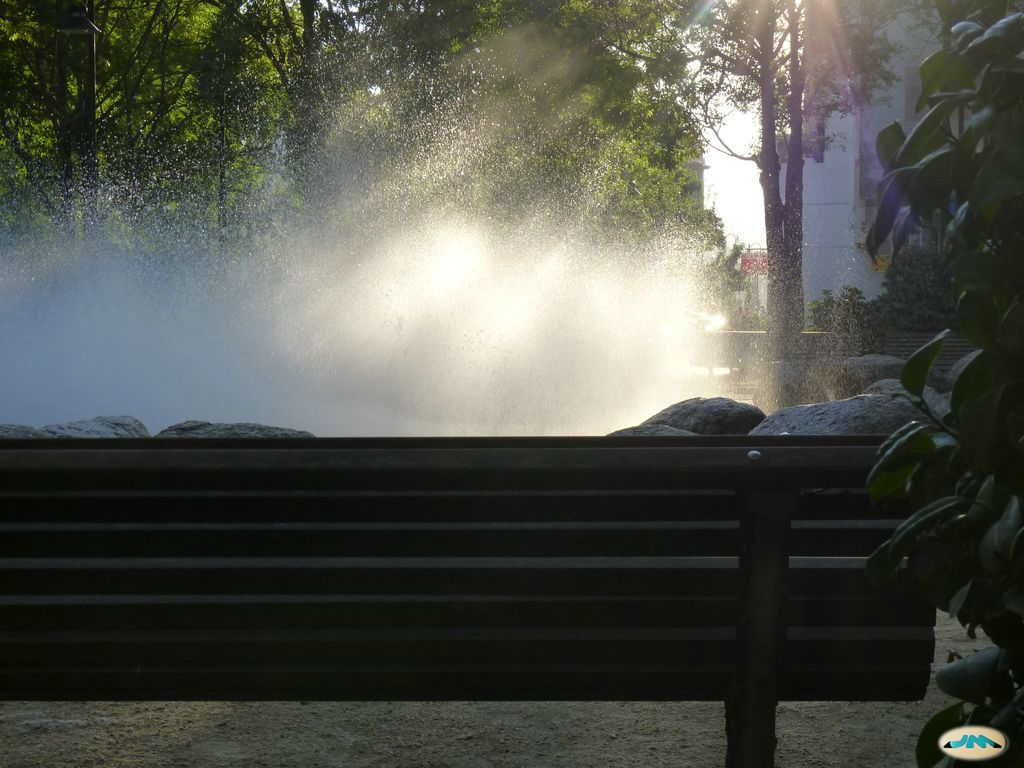
Detail of the fountain

== See also ==
=== Bibliography ===
- Martínez Sarandeses, José (1996). "Remodelación de la plaza de Galicia y su entorno, en Pontevedra. Una actuación para mejorar la calidad ambiental del espacio público y calmar el tráfico rodado". Urbanismo COAM (in Spanish) (29). Madrid: COAM (Colegio Oficial de Arquitectos de Madrid): 38–43. ISSN 0213-9391.

=== Related articles ===
- Campolongo
- Pontevedra railway station

=== External links ===
- Remodelación de la Plaza de Galicia Revista Urbanismo 29
- Old Palace Hotel, Art Nouveau building
