= Pontevedra =

City in Galicia, Spain

- Municipality
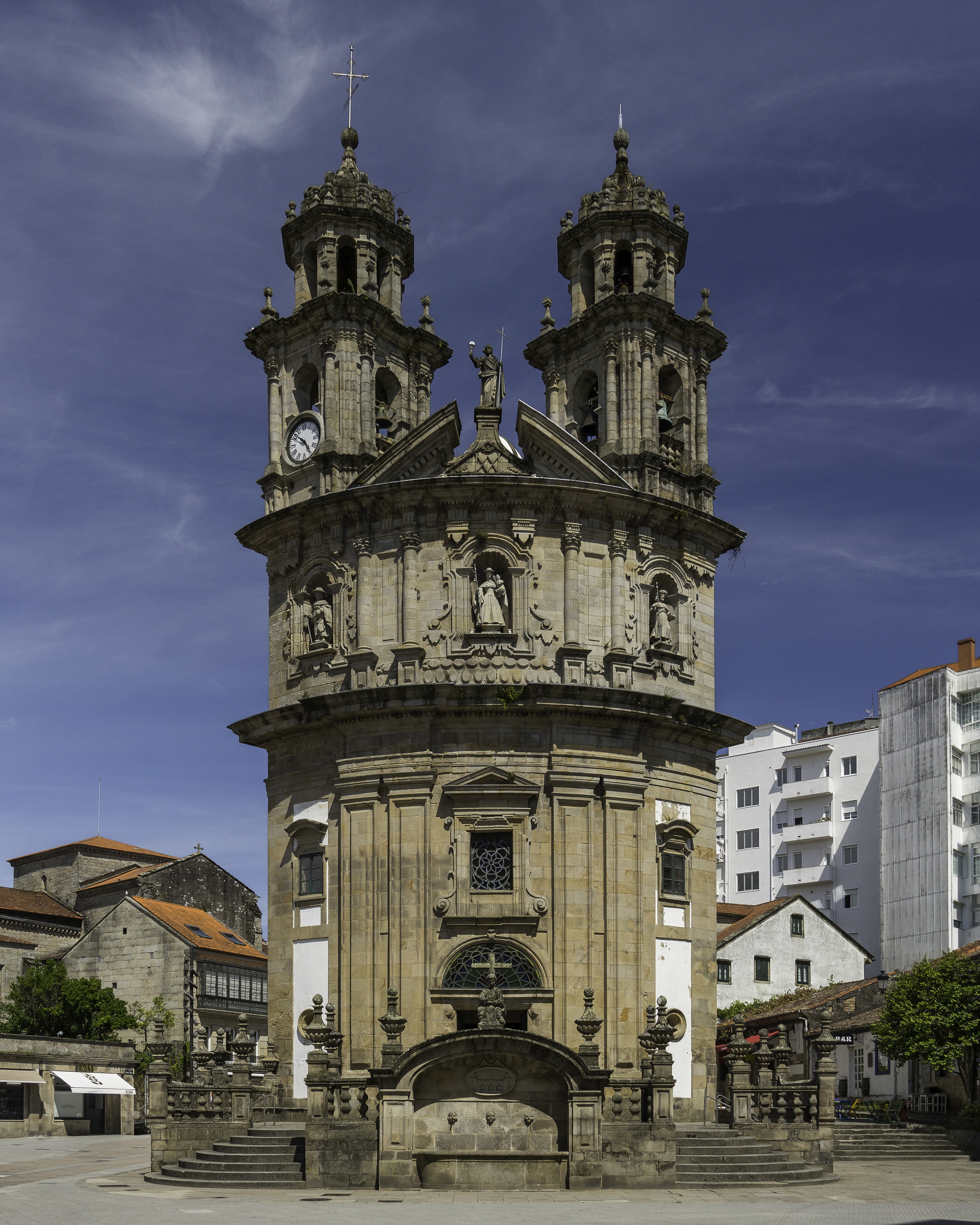
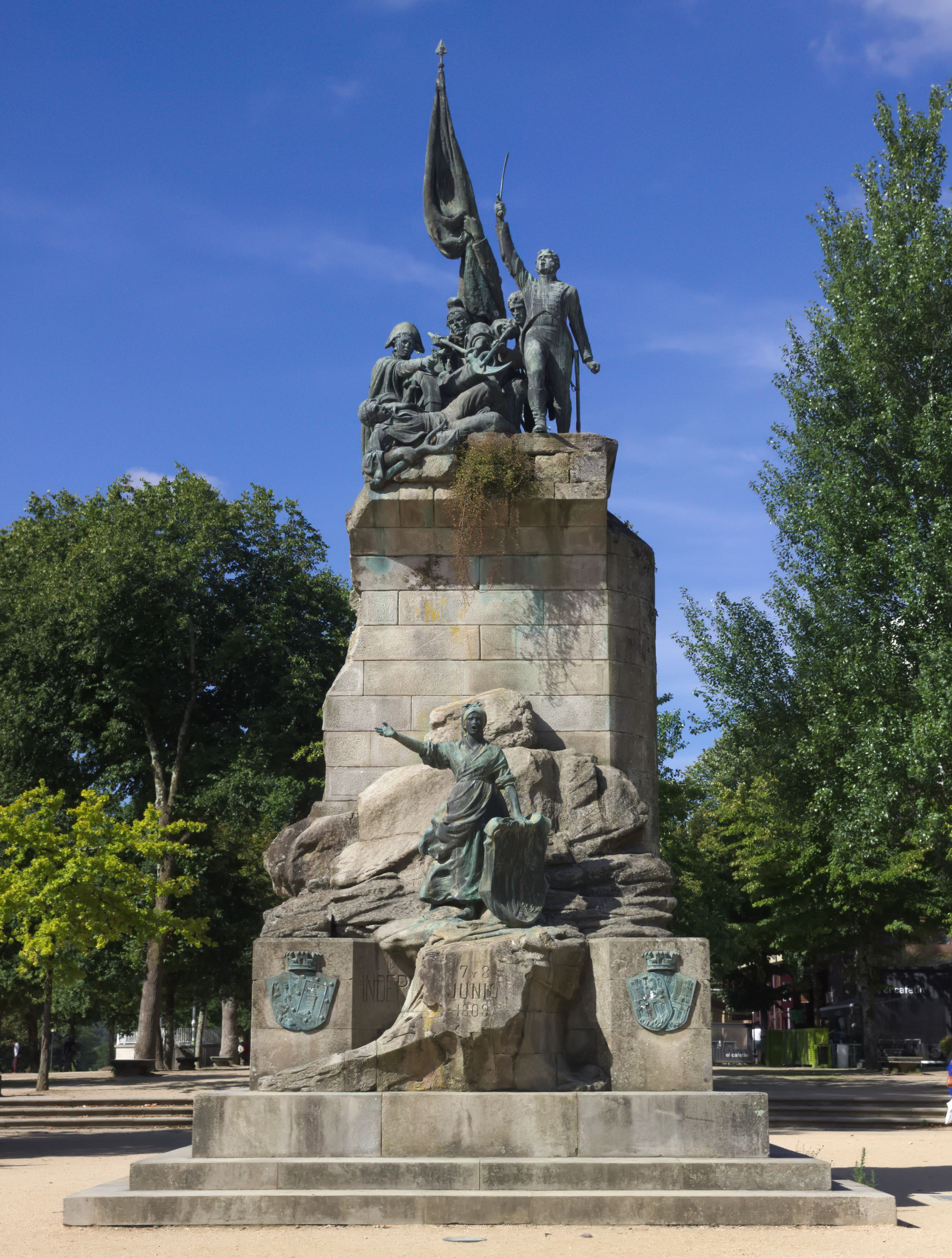
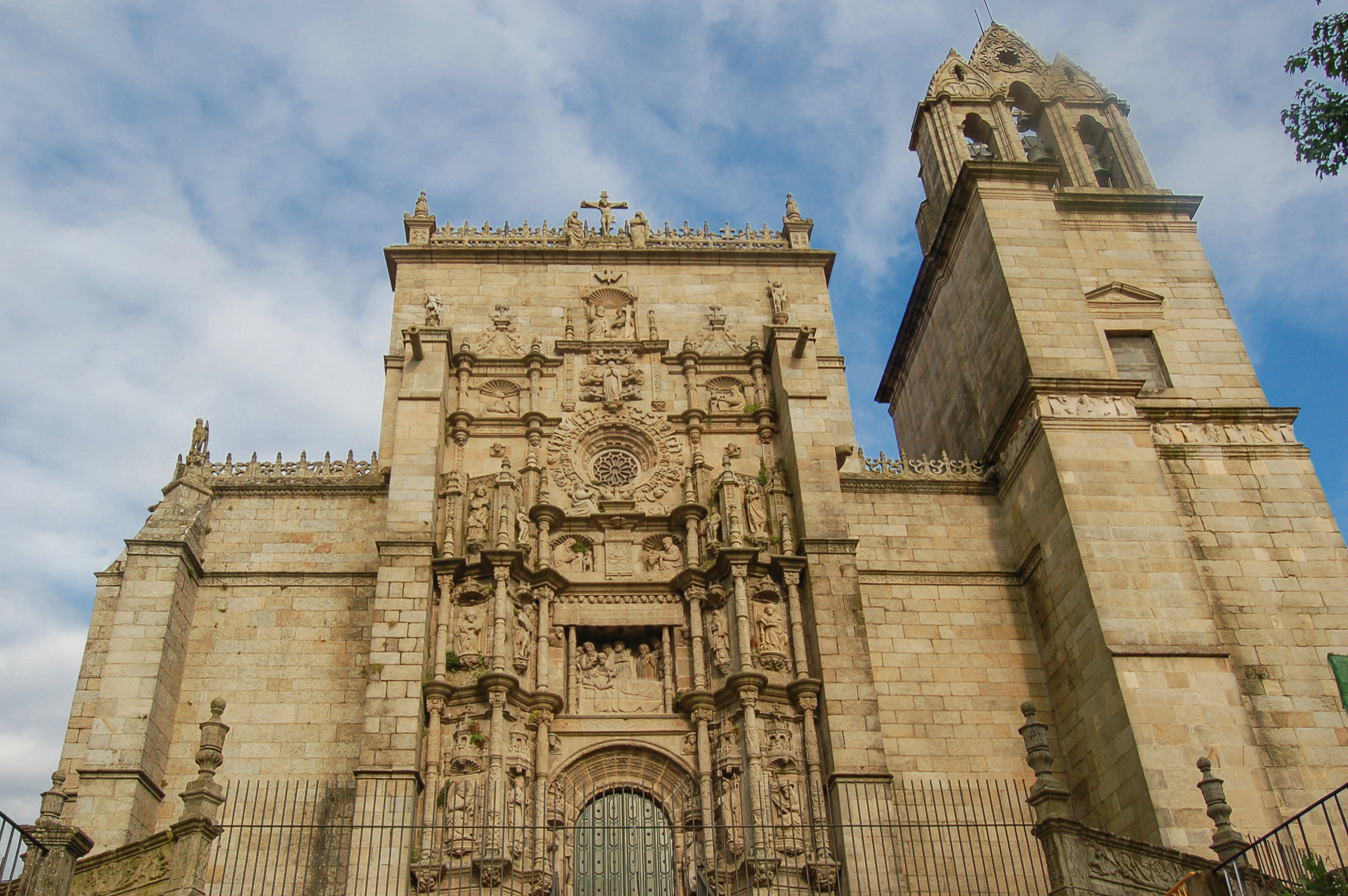
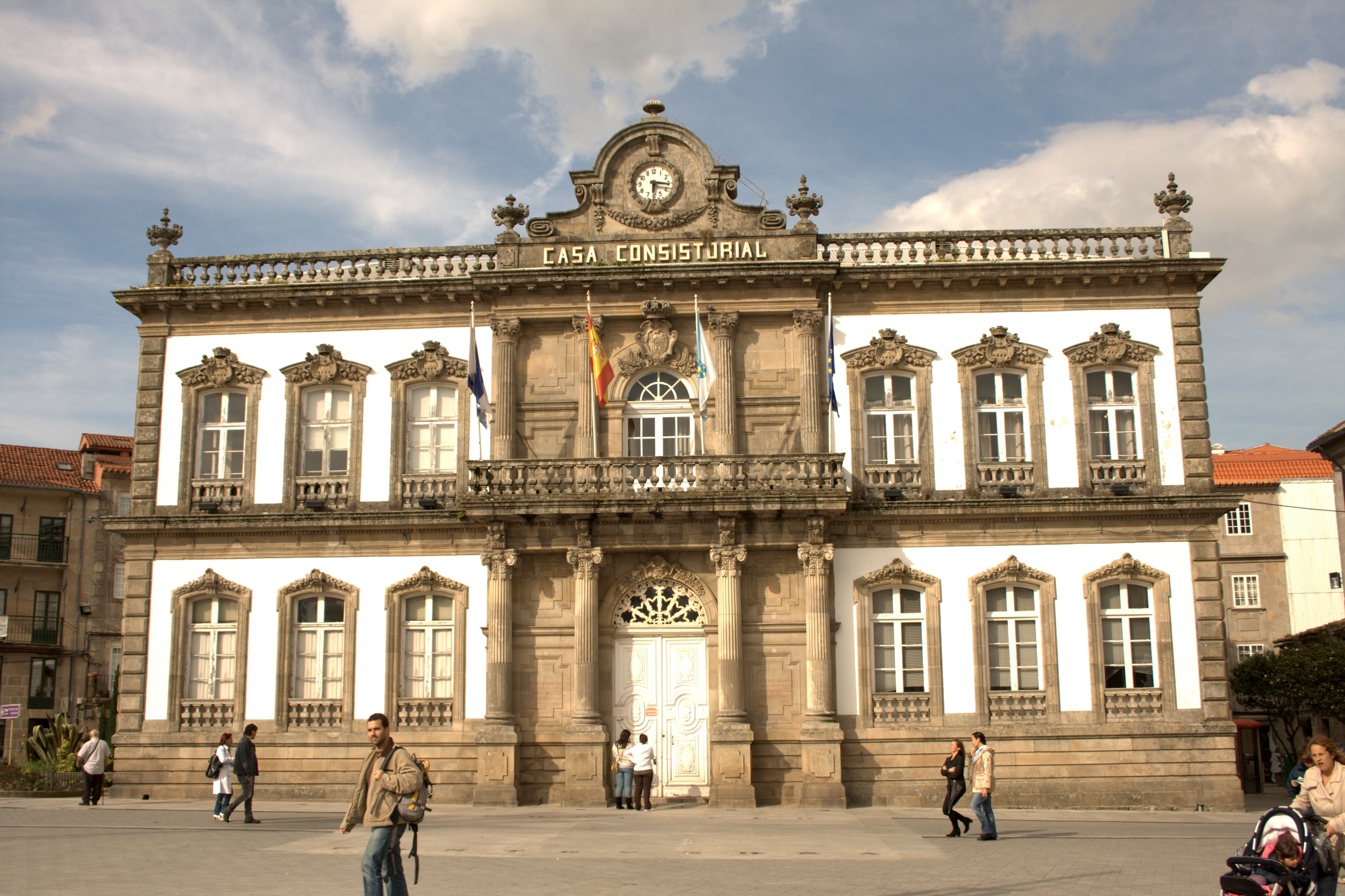
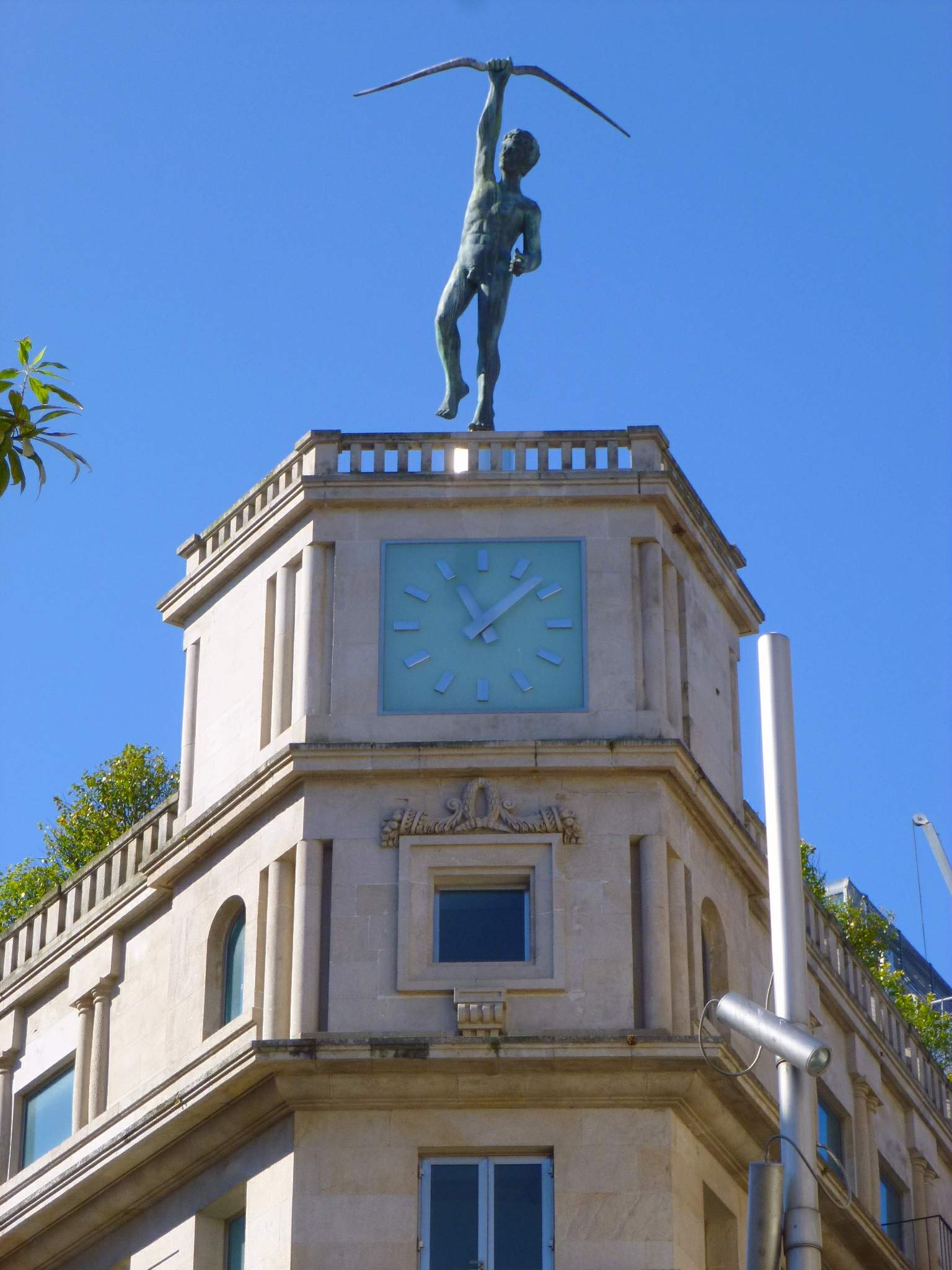
- Praza da Leña Church of the Pilgrim Virgin Monument to the heroes of Puente Sampayo Basilica of Saint Mary Major City Hall Teucer

- Flag Coat of arms
- Nicknames: The Lérez City, The Good City, The Rías Baixas Capital
- Motto: Pontevedra boa vila (The good city of Pontevedra)
- Interactive map of Pontevedra
- Location within Galicia Location within Spain
- Coordinates: 42.433619°N 8.648053°W
- Country: Spain
- Autonomous Community: Galicia
- Province: Pontevedra
- Comarca: Pontevedra
- Parishes: Alba, Bora, O Burgo, Campañó, Campolongo, A Canicouva, Cerponzóns, Lérez, Lourizán, Marcón, Monteporreiro, Mourente, Ponte Sampaio, San Bartolomé de Pontevedra, Santa María de Pontevedra, A Virxe do Camiño de Pontevedra, Salcedo, Santa María de Xeve, Tomeza, Verducido, Xeve

Government
  - Type: Ayuntamiento
  - Body: Concello de Pontevedra
  - Mayor: Miguel Anxo Fernández Lores (BNG)

Area
  - Total: 118.3 km^{2} (45.7 sq mi)
- Elevation: 20 m (66 ft)

Population (2025-01-01)
  - Total: 83,316 ▲
  - Rank: 93rd in Spain; 4th in Galicia
  - Density: 701.0/km^{2} (1,815.5/sq mi)
- Demonym(s): pontevedrés (m), pontevedresa (f) lerense teucrino (m) teucrina (f) (poet.)
- Time zone: CET (GMT +1)
  - Summer (DST): CEST (GMT +2)
- Postcode: 36001-36164
- Area code: +34 986 / 886
- INE code: 36039
- Website: www.pontevedra.gal

Pontevedra (Galician: [ˌpontɪˈβɛðɾɐ], Spanish: [ponteˈβeðɾa]) is a city in the autonomous community of Galicia, in northwestern Spain. It is the capital of both the Comarca and Province of Pontevedra, and the capital of the Rías Baixas. It is also the capital of its own municipality which is often considered an extension of the actual city.

The city is best known for its urban planning, pedestrianisation and the charm of its old town. Between 2013 and 2020, the city received numerous awards for its urban planning, like the international European Intermodes Urban Mobility Award in 2013, the 2014 Dubai International Best Practices Award for Sustainable Development awarded by UN-Habitat in partnership with Dubai Municipality and the Excellence Award of the center for Active Design in New York City in 2015, among others. The city also won the European Commission's first prize for urban safety in 2020.

Surrounded by hills, the city is located on the edge of a ria at the mouth of the Lérez river by the sea, at the end of the Ria de Pontevedra, in the heart of the Rías Baixas. An economic centre and tourist destination, with a population of 83,260 in 2020, it is at the head of a metropolitan area around its ria of more than 200,000 inhabitants comprising the municipalities of Poio, Marín, Sanxenxo, Bueu, Vilaboa, Cerdedo-Cotobade, Ponte Caldelas, Barro and Soutomaior.

Pontevedra has the second most important historic center in Galicia, after Santiago de Compostela. A city of art and history, the city is known as The Good City (name attributed by the French author Jean Froissart in his Chronicles in the 14th century) or The City of the Lérez. The city is also an important stopover on the Portuguese Way path of the Camino de Santiago: the circular church of the Pilgrim Virgin, built for the pilgrims in the 18th century, has a floor plan in the shape of a scallop shell and there are scallop shells sculpted in the arches of the medieval Burgo Bridge.

Pontevedra city has an important group of squares of medieval origin and monumental religious buildings, including the Basilica of Saint Mary Major (16th century) with its plateresque Renaissance façade, the Baroque Church of the Pilgrim Virgin (18th century) with its rounded façade, the ruins of the Gothic Convent of San Domingo (13th century), the Gothic Church of San Francisco (13th century), the Baroque Church of San Bartholomew (end of the 17th century) and the Gothic Convent of Santa Clare (14th century). Its old town also contains numerous noble houses with coat of arms (the 15th-century House of the Bells or the 18th-century García Flórez Palace), mansions – the Mendoza Mansion, Villa Pilar – as well as old palaces such as the 18th-century Mugartegui Palace, which is now the headquarters of the Rias Baixas Wine Regulatory Council, or the Counts of Maceda Palace, which is now a Parador. Another major symbol of the city is the Ravachol Parrot, whose statue is in the city centre. The city also has a marina close to its historic centre. At present, Pontevedra is a city in full revival. It has become the flagship city of the network of walkable cities and one of the cities in the world where children live best, known as The City of Children.

Pontevedra is an important administrative, political, judicial, military, historical and cultural centre. In the 16th century it was the largest city in Galicia. Nowadays it is marked by a large presence of administrative services (provincial Administrative Complex and provincial branches of the central government), justice (provincial court and provincial judicial complex), political (Pontevedra provincial council, provincial government delegation), military (provincial defence delegation, BRILAT) and cultural (Pontevedra Museum, Pontevedra Auditorium and Convention Centre, Principal Theatre, faculty of Fine Arts, Afundación cultural centre, Café Moderno).

== History ==
=== Name ===
The name of the city is likely a Latin composite of pons, pontis (bridge) and veter, vetera, veterum (old, long established). In Galicia, Latin pons, a masculine word, became feminine, hence Vulgar Latin Ponte Vetera, which became by the 13th century the modern Galician language toponymy Pontevedra, "the old bridge", in reference to an old Roman bridge across the Lérez River which had been located near the 12th-century Burgo bridge that remains in place today.

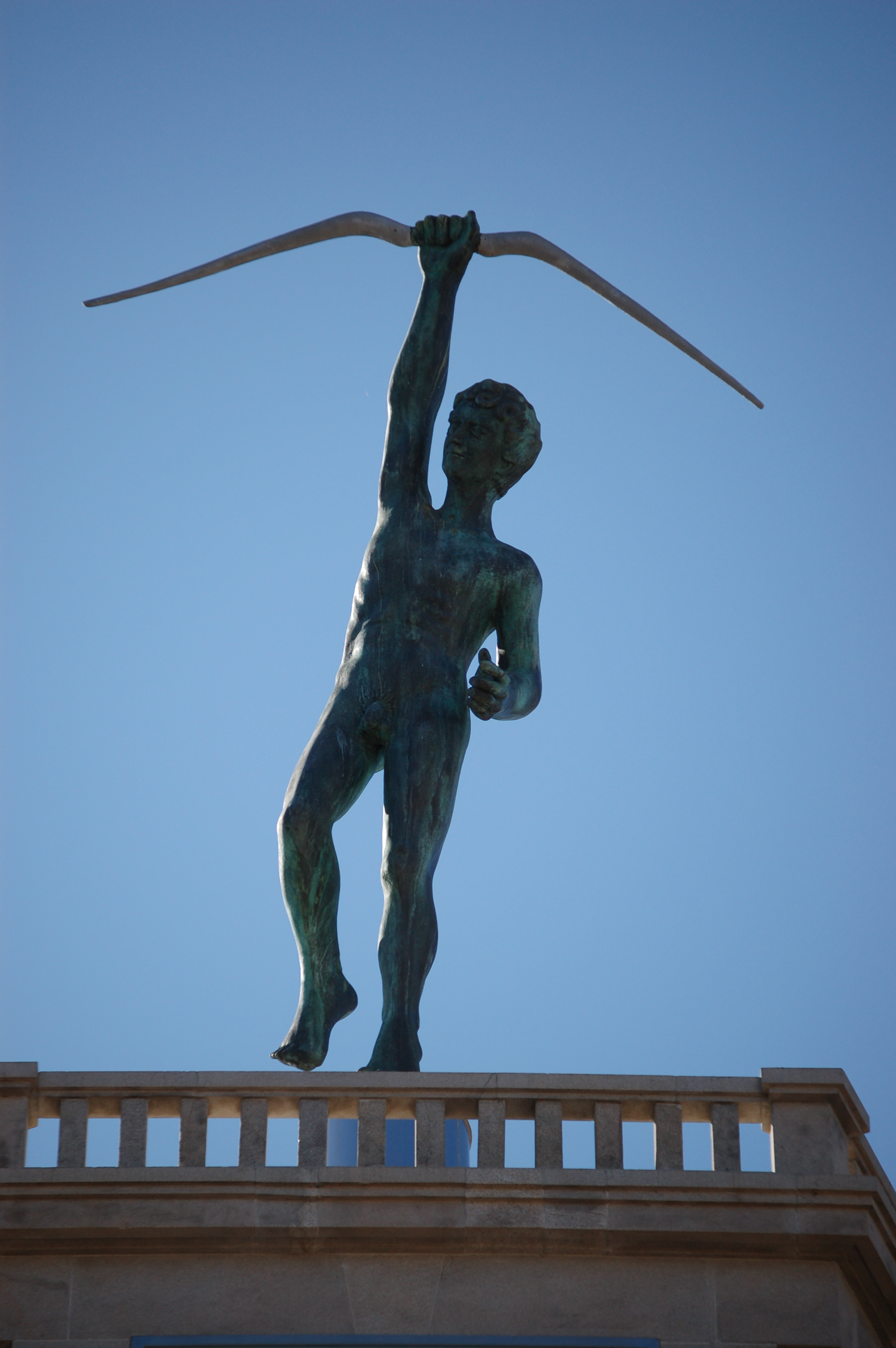
Teucer statue on San José square

However, some historians say that since in ancient Latin, ponto (pontus) meant sea and vedra meant green, its name could be due to the particular greenness of the sea caused by the seaweed tides, i.e., city of the green sea.

=== Pre-history and antiquity ===
A local legend relates the foundation of Pontevedra to Teucer, hero of the Trojan War, a legend which was reinforced with the suspicion that Greek traders might have arrived to the Rias Baixas area in ancient times. However, historians and archaeologists tend to agree that the initial settlement was probably formed during the integration of Gallaecia (old Galicia) into the Roman Empire (c. 1st century BC). Well connected since Roman times, Pontevedra consolidated itself as an intermediate town during the Suebic period (circa 5th–6th century AD).

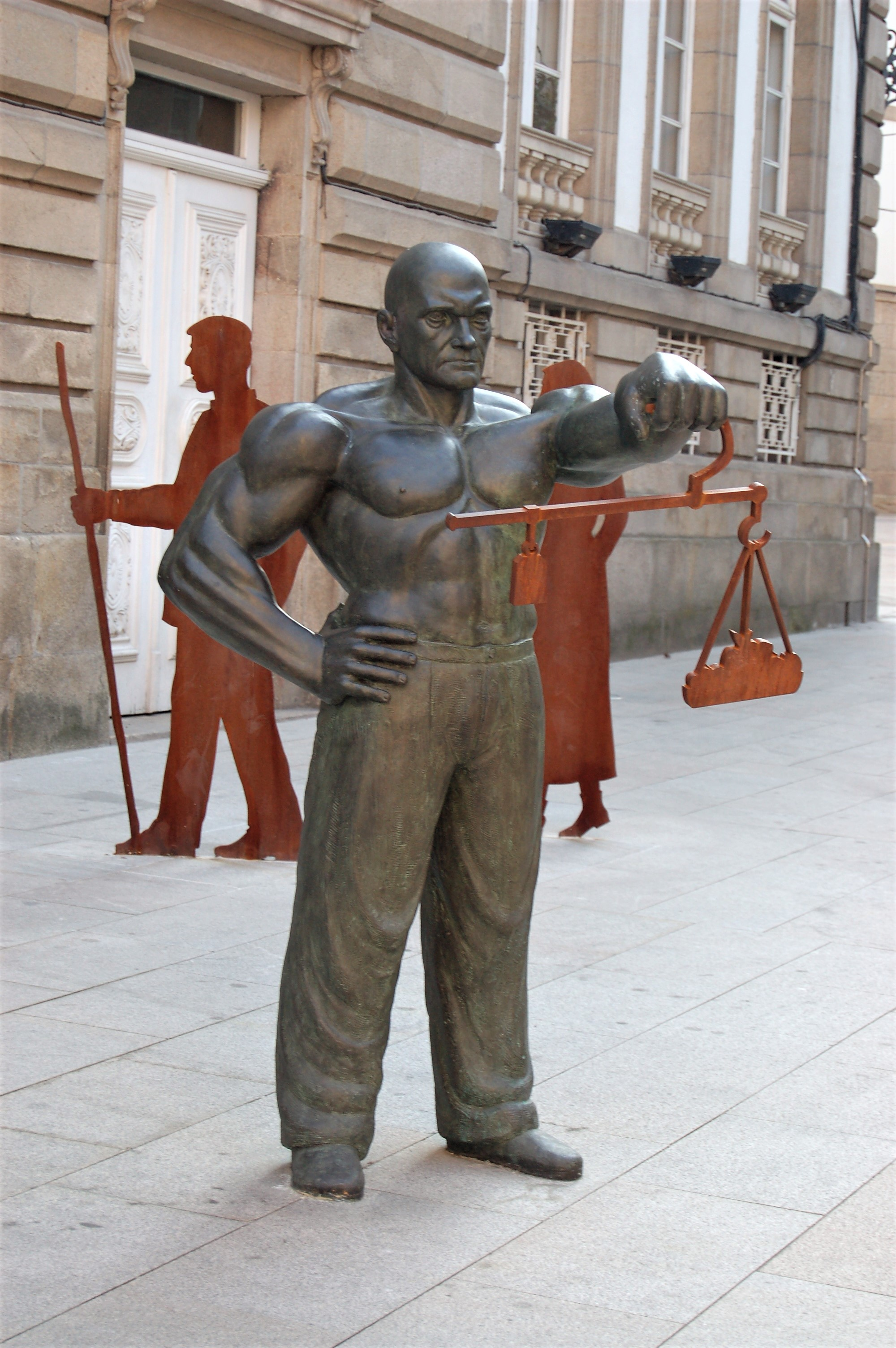
The Fiel contraste

=== Medieval and early modern ===
During the 12th century Pontevedra rose as an important commercial centre; it reached its zenith in the 15th century as a trade and communications hub. Pontevedra was the main Galician urban centre. In fact, Pontevedra has the second largest "old town" in Galicia, only after Santiago de Compostela. Pontevedra was on the route of the Way of Saint James, namely its southern or the Portuguese Way. The Church of the Pilgrim Virgin, with its distinctive scallop-shaped floor plan, is a destination for tourists and pilgrims.

In the 16th century it still was a commercial city, with an increase in fishing. At that time, Pontevedra was the largest Galician port, as it was a secure port open to the sea. One of Christopher Columbus' ships, the carrack Santa Maria, originally named La Gallega ("The Galician"), was built in Pontevedra. It was in centuries later that the sedimentation caused by Lérez river gradually rendered the harbour unsuitable for large-scale navigation. The end of the 16th century marked the beginning of the decline of the city, a decline which had already started for the rest of Galicia from the end of the 15th century.

=== Late modern ===
The situation would worsen during the 17th and 18th centuries. The port drastically reduced its activity due to the mentioned geographical causes. Furthermore, political decisions and dynastic conflicts provoked a general decay in trade, thus resulting in the depopulation of the city; the population was reduced in half during that time, also affected by epidemics.

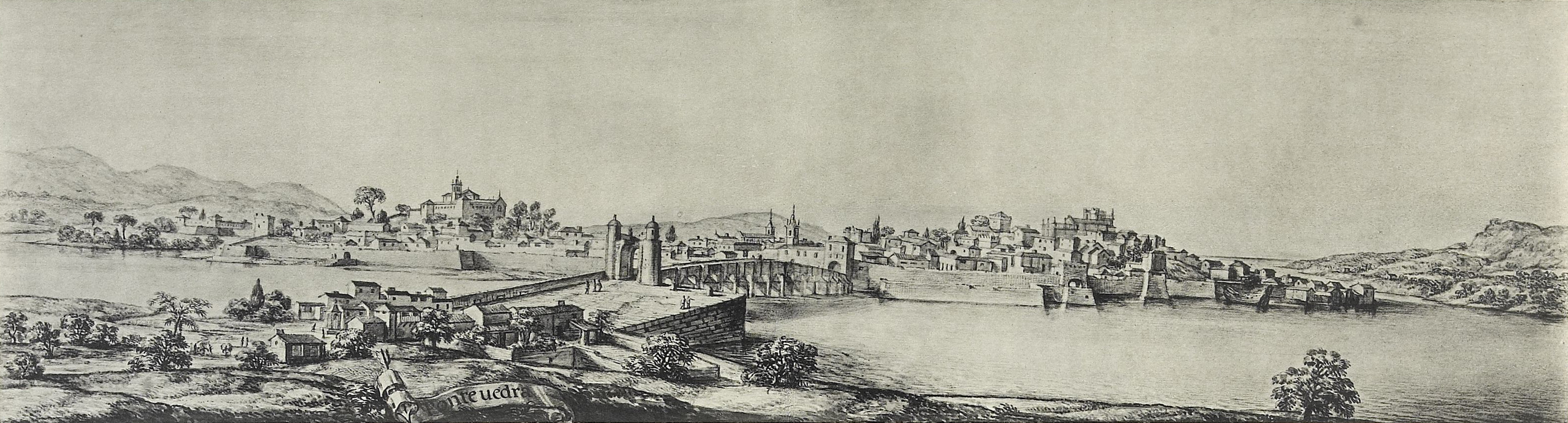
Pontevedra in 1669 in an illustration by Pier Maria Baldi

In the beginning of the 19th century fishing, arts and crafts kept the economy going. With the establishment of new provincial division in 1833 Pontevedra saw itself transformed into a provincial capital. The city then grew and became an administrative, cultural and commercial centre. The introduction of the railway also reconnected the city with the rest of the country, after having lost its harbour. All in all, Pontevedra sees in this century a cultural, economic and urban revival. It is in Pontevedra when, in 1853, Xoán Manuel Pintos publishes the first book in modern Galician, A gaita gallega.

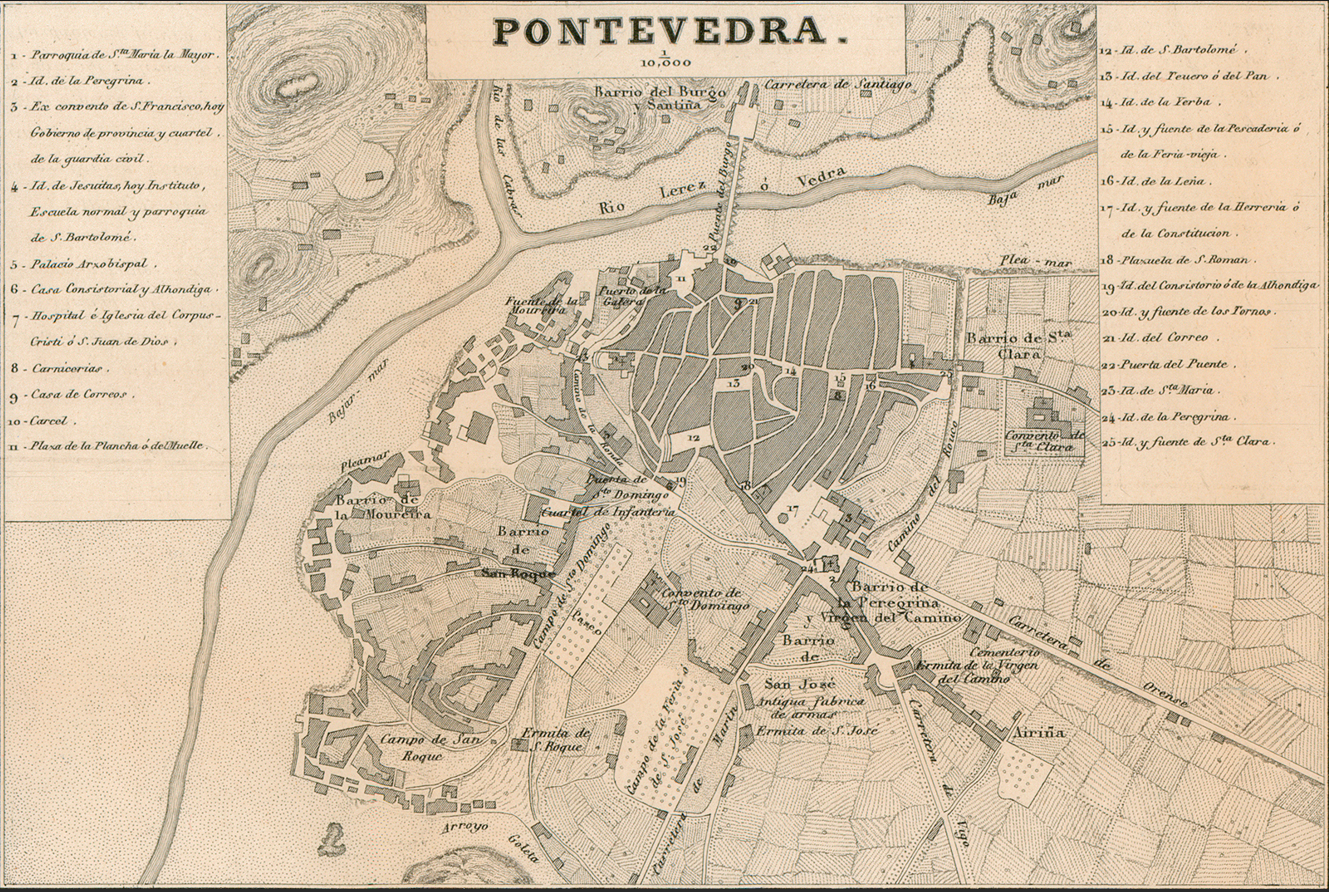
19th-century map of the city (1856), by Francisco Coello de Portugal y Quesada

=== 20th century ===
Pontevedra entered the 20th century with great prospects. The city was at the heart of Galician culture and politics. Galicianists – such as Alexandre Bóveda and Castelao – took up residence in the city, where in 1931 they founded the Partido Galeguista ("Galicianist Party"), the origin of contemporary Galician nationalism. However, the Spanish Civil War (1936–1939) and subsequent Francoist dictatorship (1939–1975) suddenly ended Pontevedra's progression. Political repression and economic hardships forced many to emigrate.

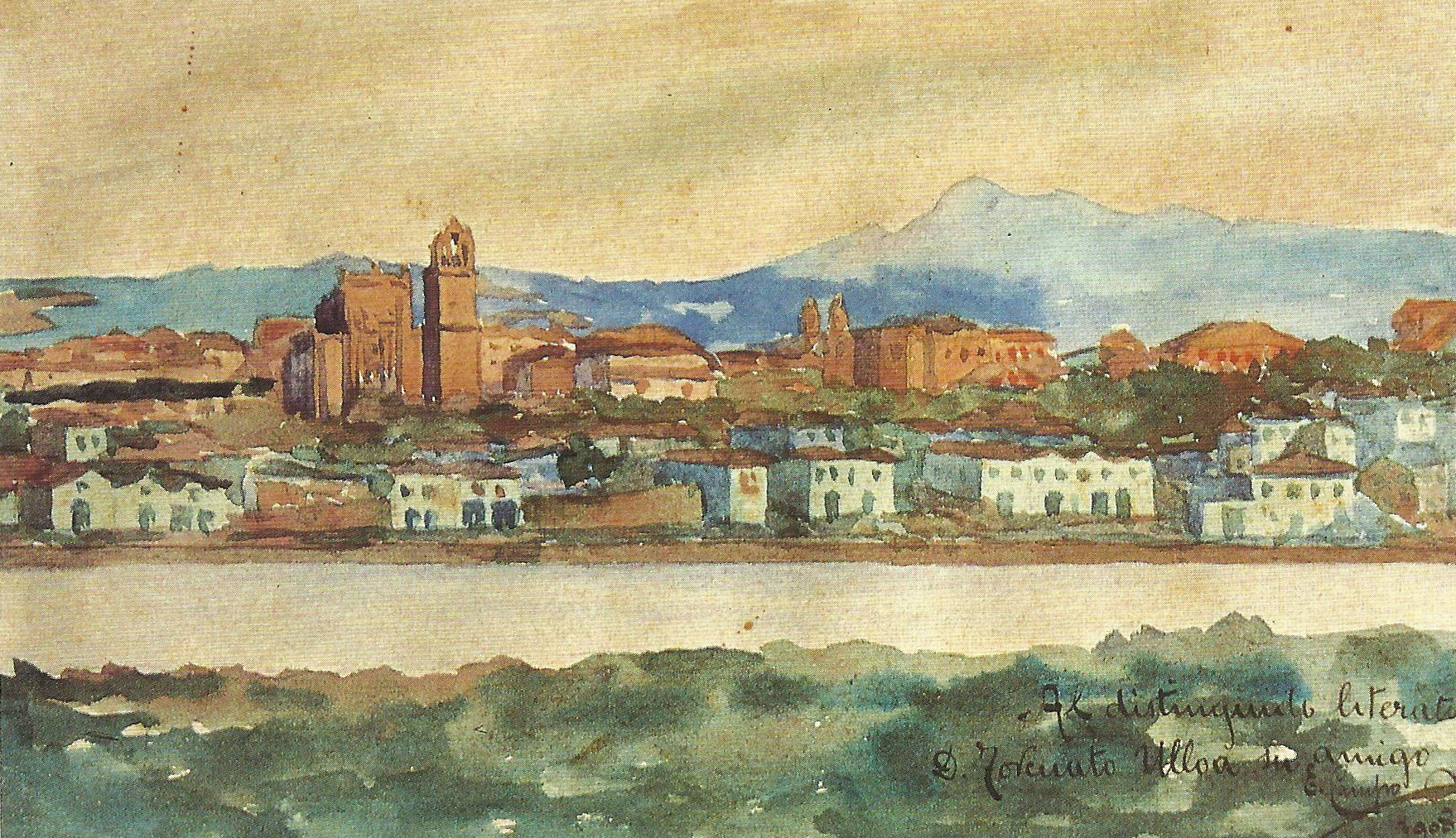
Pontevedra in 1908, by Enrique Campo

In the 1940s–1960s the government of the Franco dictatorship granted a Free Zone and a Development Pole to the neighbouring city of Vigo, a rare case in Spain (for a city that was not a provincial capital), which favoured the economic development of this city in the province of Pontevedra to the detriment of the provincial capital, Pontevedra, becoming rival cities. The recovery of the local economy only partially began in the 1960s, with the introduction of some industrial activity. However, these very activities would later cause serious environmental and health concerns, forcing the eventual closure of some of them.

With the end of the dictatorship in 1975 the construction sector also developed. Improvements in the communications network during the 1980s and 1990s helped Pontevedra to regain weight in the Rias Baixas region, acting again as a trade hub and focusing on its administrative functions as provincial capital. The introduction of university studies in the city during the 1990s contributed further to the growth of the city. Since 1999 Pontevedra has seen intense urban renewal and cultural revival, positively influencing the local economy.

=== 21st century ===
In the 21st century the city of Pontevedra has undergone both a cultural renaissance and an urban transformation, taking in the pedestrianisation of the city centre, extension of cycle lanes, recovery of the historical and natural heritage, rehabilitation of buildings and public spaces, and an increase in green areas and pedestrian walkways. Unlike the other six large cities of Galicia, which have lost inhabitants to neighboring municipalities, Pontevedra's population is currently increasing. It has become one of the most accessible cities for disabled people, receiving a national prize for this in 2006, along with the international European INTERMODES Urban Mobility Award in 2013, the 2014 Dubai International Best Practices Award for Sustainable Development awarded by UN-Habitat in partnership with Dubai Municipality and the Award of the Center of Active Design in New York City in 2015. Pontevedra's model for responsible mobility is currently seen as an international reference.

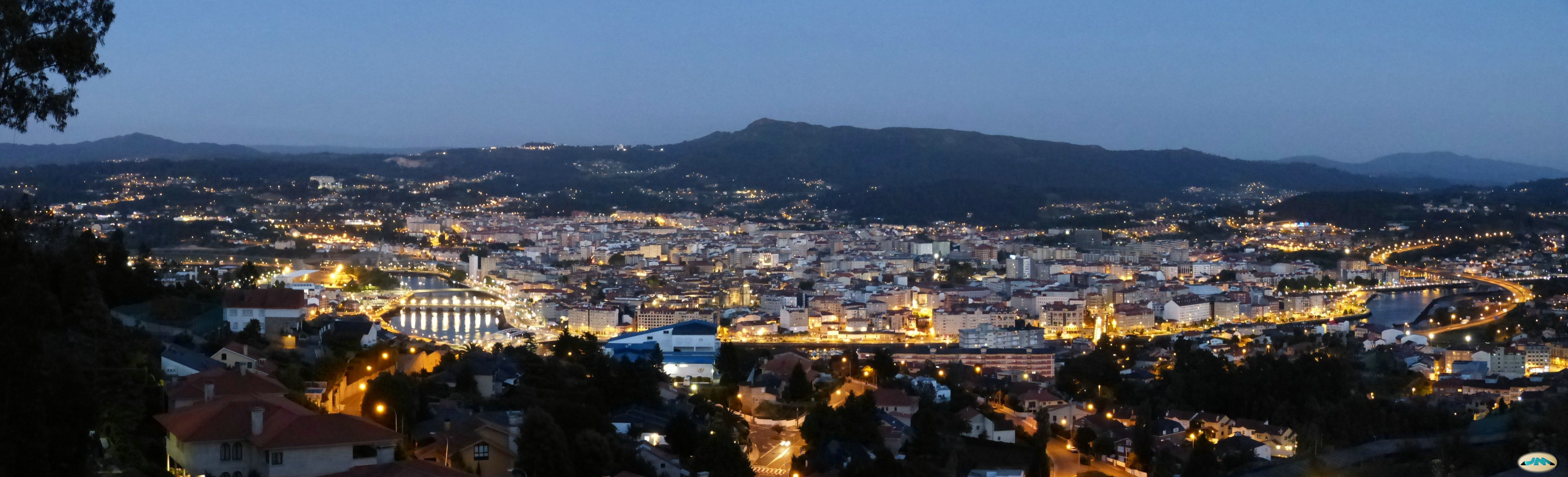
Pontevedra city, night view.

== Geography ==
=== Physical ===
==== Location and subdivisions ====
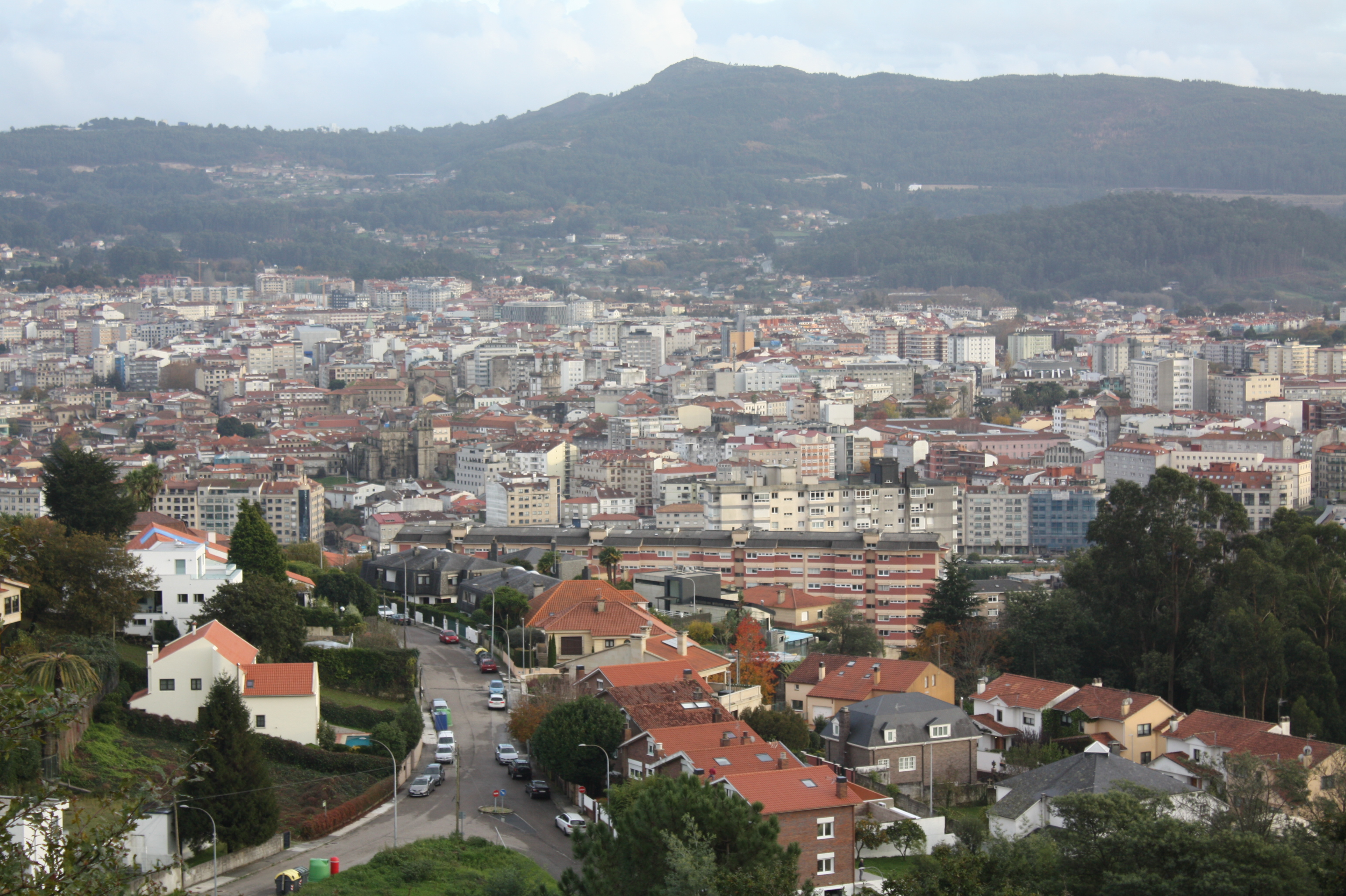
Partial view of the city from the A Caeira area

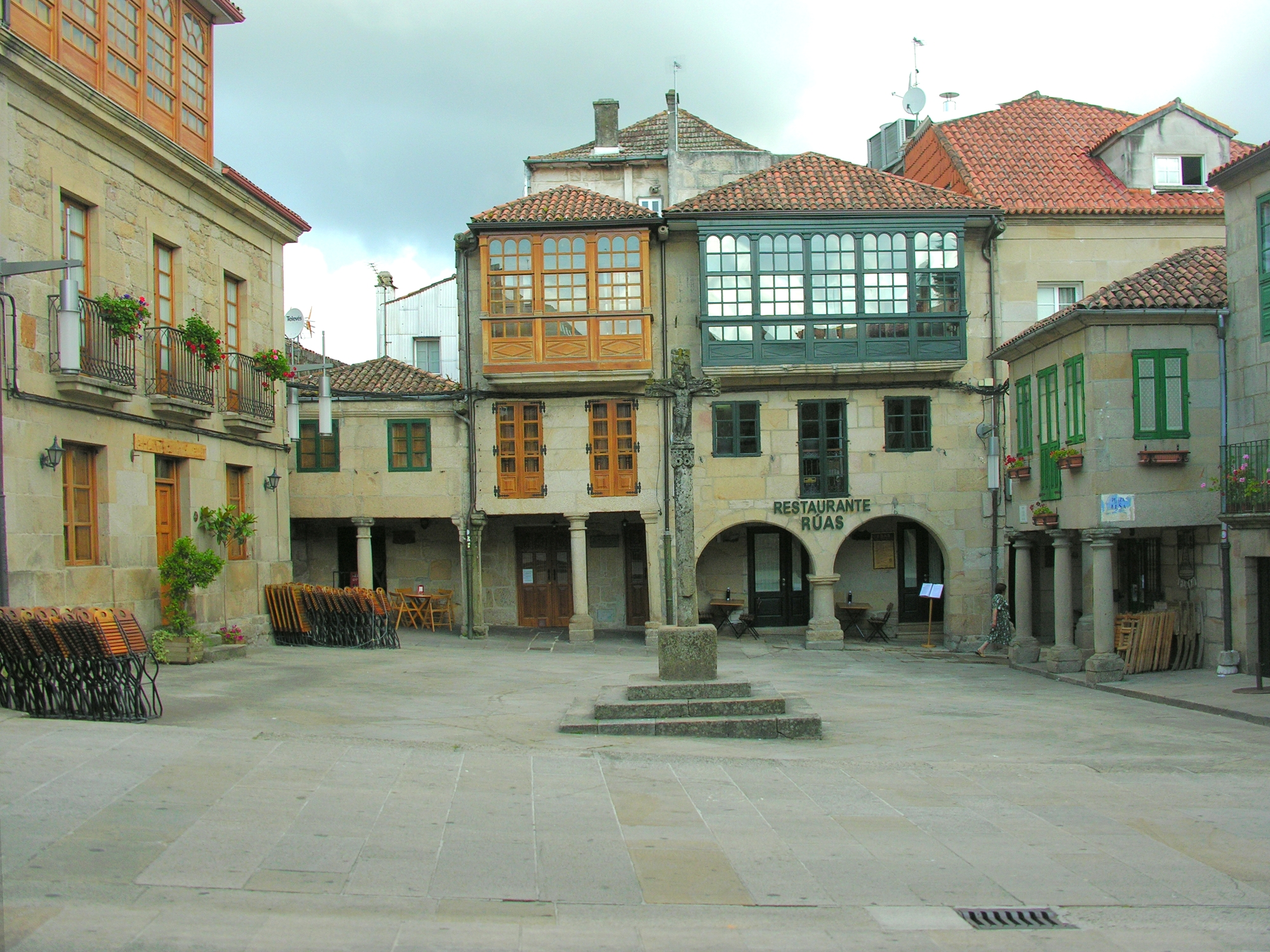
Praza da Leña, the old firewood marketplace, in the old town

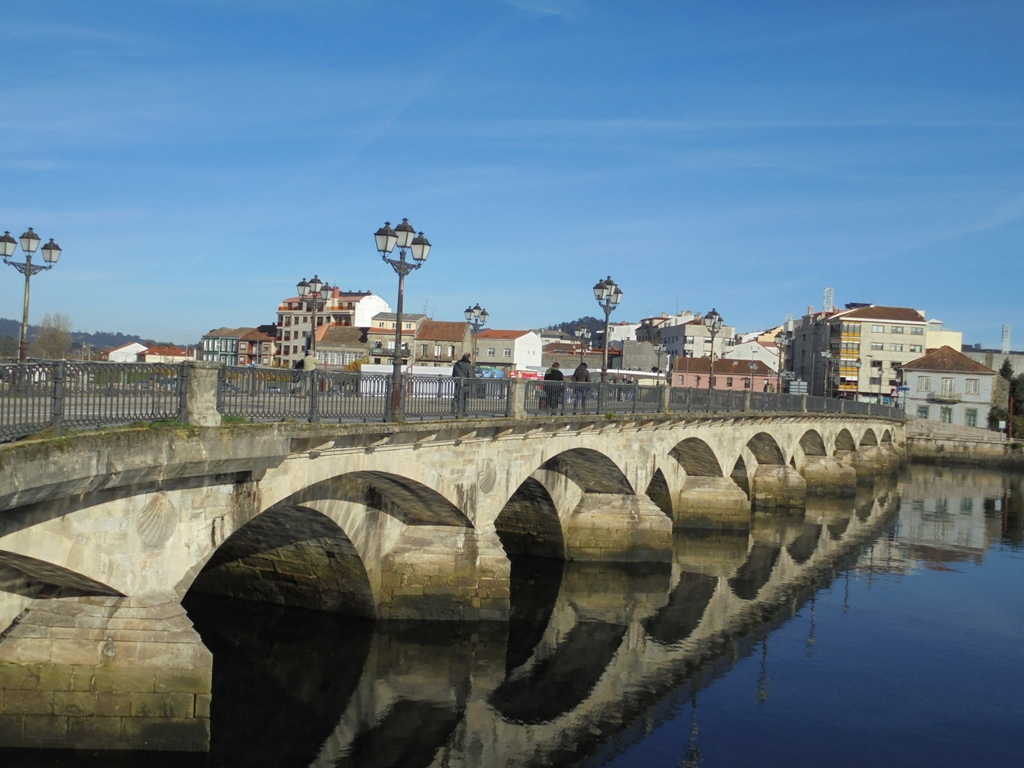
Burgo Bridge was built in the 12th century near the former site of a Roman bridge, the "old bridge" that gave the city its name.

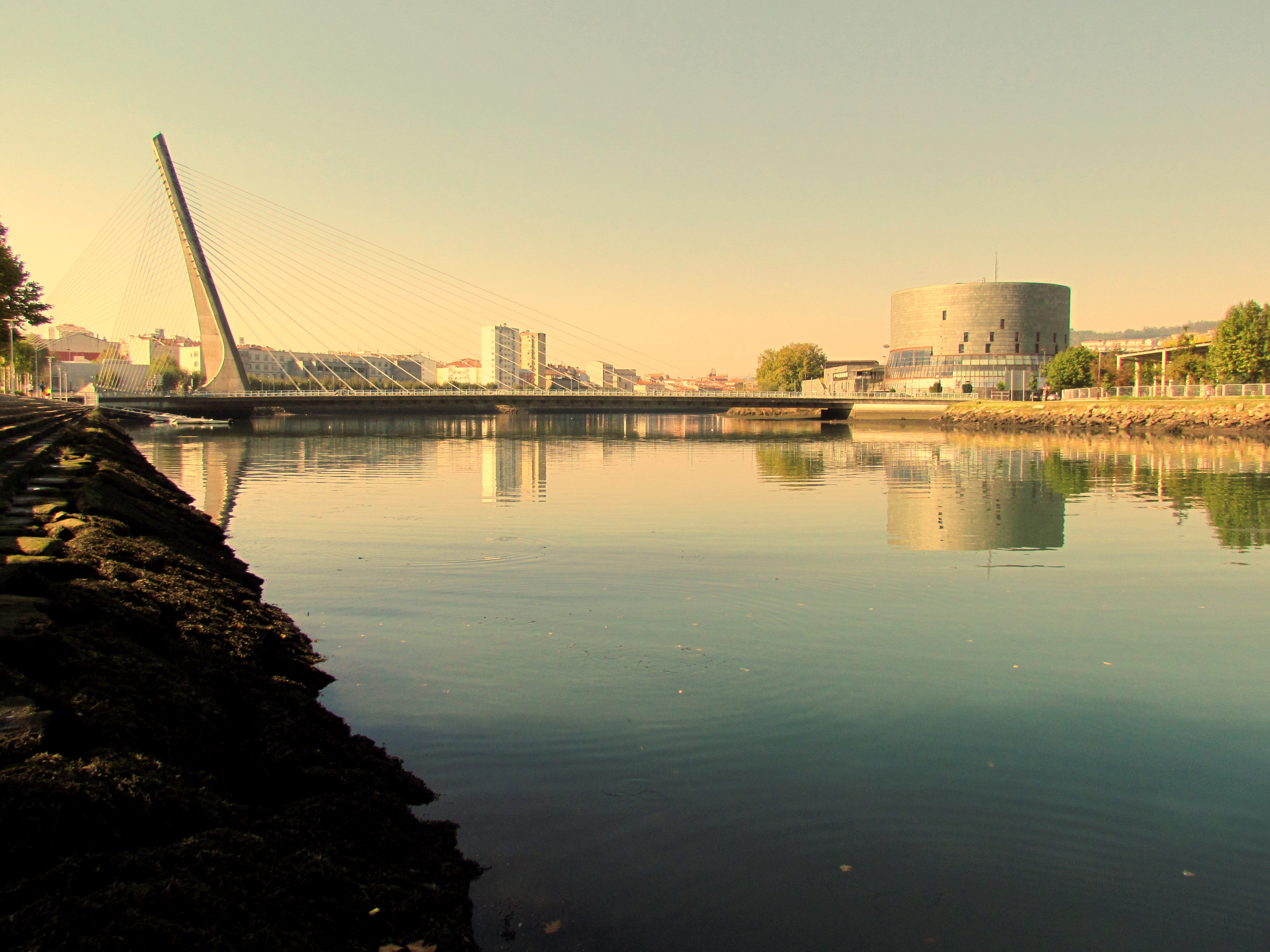
Ria of Pontevedra, Congress Hall and Tirantes Bridge

The municipality of Pontevedra is located between 42°20' and 42°30' north and 8°33' and 8°41' west, in the southwestern Galician coast, an area popularly known as Rias Baixas. The municipality covers 118.3 km^{2} (45.7 sq mi) and is about 20 km (12 mi) wide from north to south.

The city sits at the end of the ria that bears its name, occupying the valleys of the Lérez and Tomeza rivers. It extends southwards to the mouth of river Verdugo in Ponte Sampaio. It is surrounded by four mountainous regions divided by two faults, one stretching north–south and one from northeast to southwest.

To the north it borders the municipalities of Barro, Moraña and Campo Lameiro; to the east, Cotobade and Ponte Caldelas; to the south, Soutomaior, Vilaboa and Marín, and to the west, Poio and the ria, leading to the Atlantic Ocean.

The main parroquias (parishes) of Pontevedra are: Alba, Bora, Campañó, A Canicouva, Cerponzóns, Estribela, Lérez, Lourizán, Marcón, Mourente, Ponte Sampaio, Salcedo, San Xosé, Santa María de Xeve, Tomeza, Verducido, Xeve.

The neighbourhoods or main areas of Pontevedra are: the old town, the city centre-Ensanche, O Burgo, Campolongo, A Moureira, Mollavao, Monte Porreiro, A Parda, A Seca, Valdecorvos, Salgueiriños, Gorgullón. The residential area of A Caeira, although officially located in the municipality of Poio, is often considered as just another neighbourhood of Pontevedra since the vast majority of the residents work in Pontevedra and relate to the city.

==== Climate ====
Pontevedra has a humid oceanic climate (Köppen Cfb). The average temperature is 15 °C (59 °F), with a daily average of 9.5 °C (49.1 °F) in January and 20.5 °C (68.9 °F) in July. These are unusually mild for a city so far north, and are due to Pontevedra's proximity to the sea and to the moderating effect of the ria. Yet, like all the Galician coast, Pontevedra is subject to occasional Atlantic storms in winter. These are characterised by a quick drop in temperature, rain and gales. With eleven of the twelve months above 10 °C (50 °F) Pontevedra is in the maritime subtropical climate zone under the Trewartha climate classification, a classification it falls short of under the Köppen classification due to the cool summer nights.

Overall Pontevedra, like Galicia, is rainy, especially at the end of autumn and winter, with an annual average precipitation of 1,700 to 1,900 millimetres (66.9 to 74.8 in), and around 134 rainy days per year. Summer is drier, generally speaking, making Pontevedra the sunniest city in Galicia with 2248 hours of sunshine per year.

Climate data for Pontevedra 108m (1981–2010)
Month	Jan	Feb	Mar	Apr	May	Jun	Jul	Aug	Sep	Oct	Nov	Dec	Year
Record high °C (°F)	22.5 (72.5)	23.4 (74.1)	28.4 (83.1)	31.3 (88.3)	34.0 (93.2)	38.0 (100.4)	39.5 (103.1)	38.2 (100.8)	36.6 (97.9)	32.2 (90.0)	25.6 (78.1)	23.4 (74.1)	39.5 (103.1)
Mean daily maximum °C (°F)	12.9 (55.2)	14.2 (57.6)	16.9 (62.4)	17.6 (63.7)	20.6 (69.1)	23.8 (74.8)	25.9 (78.6)	26.0 (78.8)	23.7 (74.7)	19.6 (67.3)	15.4 (59.7)	13.4 (56.1)	19.2 (66.6)
Daily mean °C (°F)	9.6 (49.3)	10.4 (50.7)	12.4 (54.3)	13.0 (55.4)	15.8 (60.4)	18.6 (65.5)	20.4 (68.7)	20.6 (69.1)	18.8 (65.8)	15.7 (60.3)	12.1 (53.8)	10.3 (50.5)	14.8 (58.6)
Mean daily minimum °C (°F)	6.3 (43.3)	6.5 (43.7)	7.8 (46.0)	8.4 (47.1)	10.9 (51.6)	13.4 (56.1)	14.9 (58.8)	15.2 (59.4)	13.8 (56.8)	11.7 (53.1)	8.7 (47.7)	7.1 (44.8)	10.4 (50.7)
Record low °C (°F)	−3.6 (25.5)	−1.7 (28.9)	−2.0 (28.4)	0.6 (33.1)	4.2 (39.6)	7.0 (44.6)	9.2 (48.6)	9.8 (49.6)	7.2 (45.0)	4.2 (39.6)	0.0 (32.0)	−1.5 (29.3)	−3.6 (25.5)
Average rainfall mm (inches)	178 (7.0)	133 (5.2)	120 (4.7)	143 (5.6)	118 (4.6)	64 (2.5)	44 (1.7)	56 (2.2)	95 (3.7)	224 (8.8)	222 (8.7)	216 (8.5)	1,613 (63.5)
Average precipitation days (≥ 1 mm)	14	11	11	14	12	7	5	6	8	14	14	14	131
Average snowy days	0.1	0	0	0	0	0	0	0	0	0	0	0	0.2
Average relative humidity (%)	77	72	68	69	69	67	67	68	72	76	78	77	72
Mean monthly sunshine hours	103	123	181	203	239	262	294	279	224	145	104	91	2,248
Source: Agencia Estatal de Meteorología

== Demographics ==
Historical population
Year	Pop.	±%
1842	4,141	—
1857	6,623	+59.9%
1877	20,140	+204.1%
1887	20,550	+2.0%
1900	22,806	+11.0%
1910	25,072	+9.9%
1920	28,957	+15.5%
1930	30,566	+5.6%
1940	32,839	+7.4%
1950	41,828	+27.4%
1960	50,575	+20.9%
1970	52,562	+3.9%
1981	64,184	+22.1%
1991	71,491	+11.4%
2001	74,942	+4.8%
2011	82,346	+9.9%
2025	83,316	+1.2%
Source: National Statistics Institute

The municipality of Pontevedra is composed of the city of Pontevedra and fifteen rural parishes in close proximity, with a total population of 83,316 (as of 2025). This results in a relatively high population density of 710.1 inhabitants per square kilometre. More than two-thirds of the population live in the city, and less than one-third in the rural parishes.

The population of Pontevedra is aging, and generational replacement is not necessarily assured, although the city's population has been gradually growing since 1999. Broken down by age, 15.93% of the population were senior citizens, 69% between 15 and 65 years, and just 15.01% under 15 years of age. The natality rate (9.8‰) is only +1.8 over the mortality rate (8‰). The migrational balance is slightly positive (+350 people in 2006). According to the local authorities Pontevedra has been, since 1999, the fastest growing Galician city, with an average of 1000 more inhabitants per year. Pontevedra is the city with the youngest population in Galicia and northwest Spain and the Galician city that attracts the most people to live in, together with Santiago de Compostela. It is the Galician city with the best rate of natural increase (RNI).

According to the 2001 census, 29.6% of the population speak Galician as their mother tongue, whereas 32.1% speak it "often". The remaining 38.3% speak Castilian as their native language or speak mostly in Castilian.

=== Immigration ===
Foreign nationalities in 2022
Ranking	Country	Number of nationals
1.	Venezuela	691
2.	Colombia	610
3.	Portugal	460
4.	Brazil	404
5.	Morocco	393
6.	Peru	244
7.	Italy	208
8.	China	178
9.	Romania	145
10.	Argentina	144
11.	Senegal	125
12.	United Kingdom	82
13.	Dominican Republic	80
14.	United States	76
15.	France	76

In 2022, a total of 4818 foreigners resided in the city, of which, by continent, the majority were citizens of America mainly from South America and especially from Venezuela, Colombia and Brazil, although also from Peru, Argentina, Dominican Republic and United States and citizens from Europe, mainly citizens from other European Union countries, such as Portugal, Italy, Romania, United Kingdom, France and Germany. Behind them are African citizens, mainly from Morocco and Senegal, and Asians from China.

== Urban planning and living environment ==
Pontevedra has a pedestrianised city centre, which includes the old town and the city centre or first urban expansion area with streets such as General Gutiérrez Mellado and Daniel de la Sota among many others and squares such as Glorieta de Compostela or Concepción Arenal, which, together with parks such as Las Palmeras (the Palm Trees Park) and other squares, make the city very pleasant to walk in and give it a high quality of life.

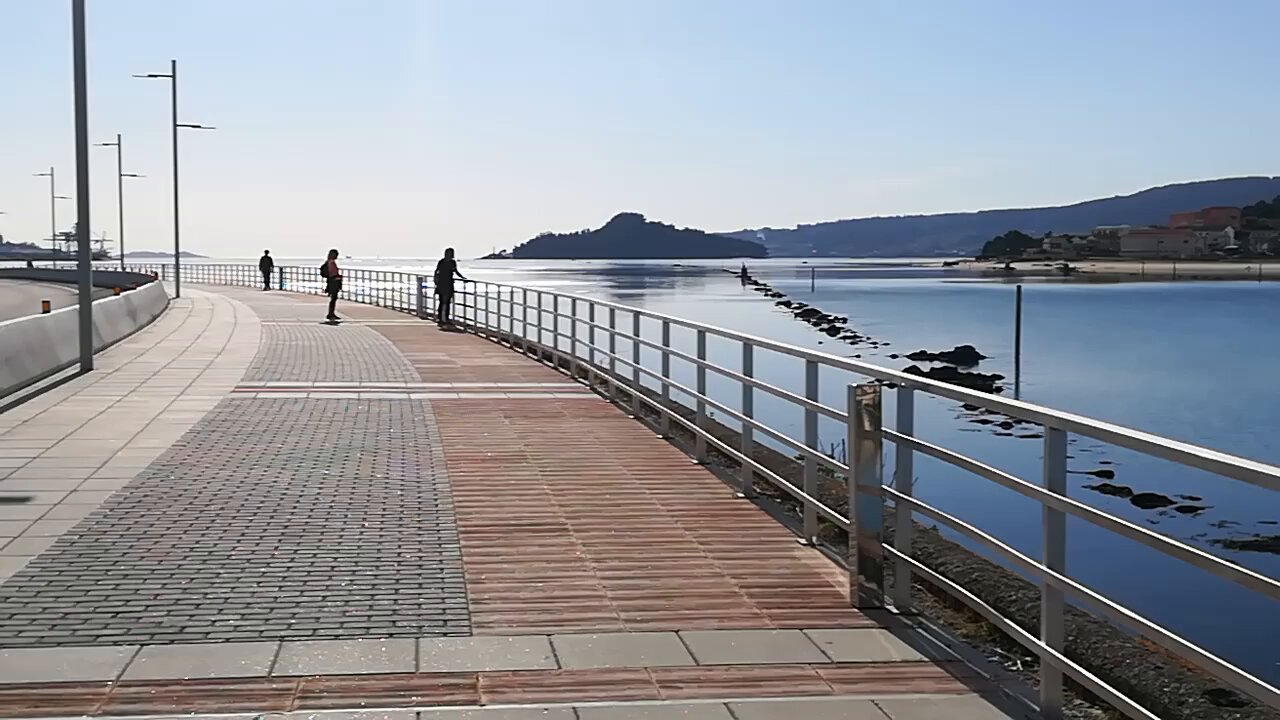
Pontevedra seafront promenade

An island on the Lérez, opposite a remarkable cable-stayed bridge dating from 1995 (the Tirantes Bridge, the Strap Bridge) and next to the modern Pontevedra Auditorium and Convention Centre shelters Island of Sculptures park. The park presents work from artists including Robert Morris, Ulrich Rückriem, Anne and Patrick Poirier, Giovanni Anselmo, Richard Long, Ian Hamilton Finlay or Jenny Holzer.

Another large park, the Marismas de Alba Natural Park, is located near the Burgo district, in front of the tied-arch Currents Bridge, inaugurated in 2012.

=== Pedestrianization ===
The capital of the province of Pontevedra has become one of the most pedestrianised cities in Spain. The old city and much of the city centre are pedestrianized, so that in these neighbourhoods, motorized transport is limited to residents and services.

In 1999 Pontevedra began its transformation process by pedestrianizing its old town. In the following years, the city centre and some other streets on the outskirts of Pontevedra were pedestrianised too. In 2010, Pontevedra was the first provincial capital in Spain to reduce the maximum speed in the city centre to 30 kilometres per hour and in 2019 to 10 kilometres per hour in the city centre. Although service vans and couriers are still permitted to enter the center at restricted times and along designated routes, they also have to follow a 10 KM (6 mph) reduced speed limit, as reports the Independent.

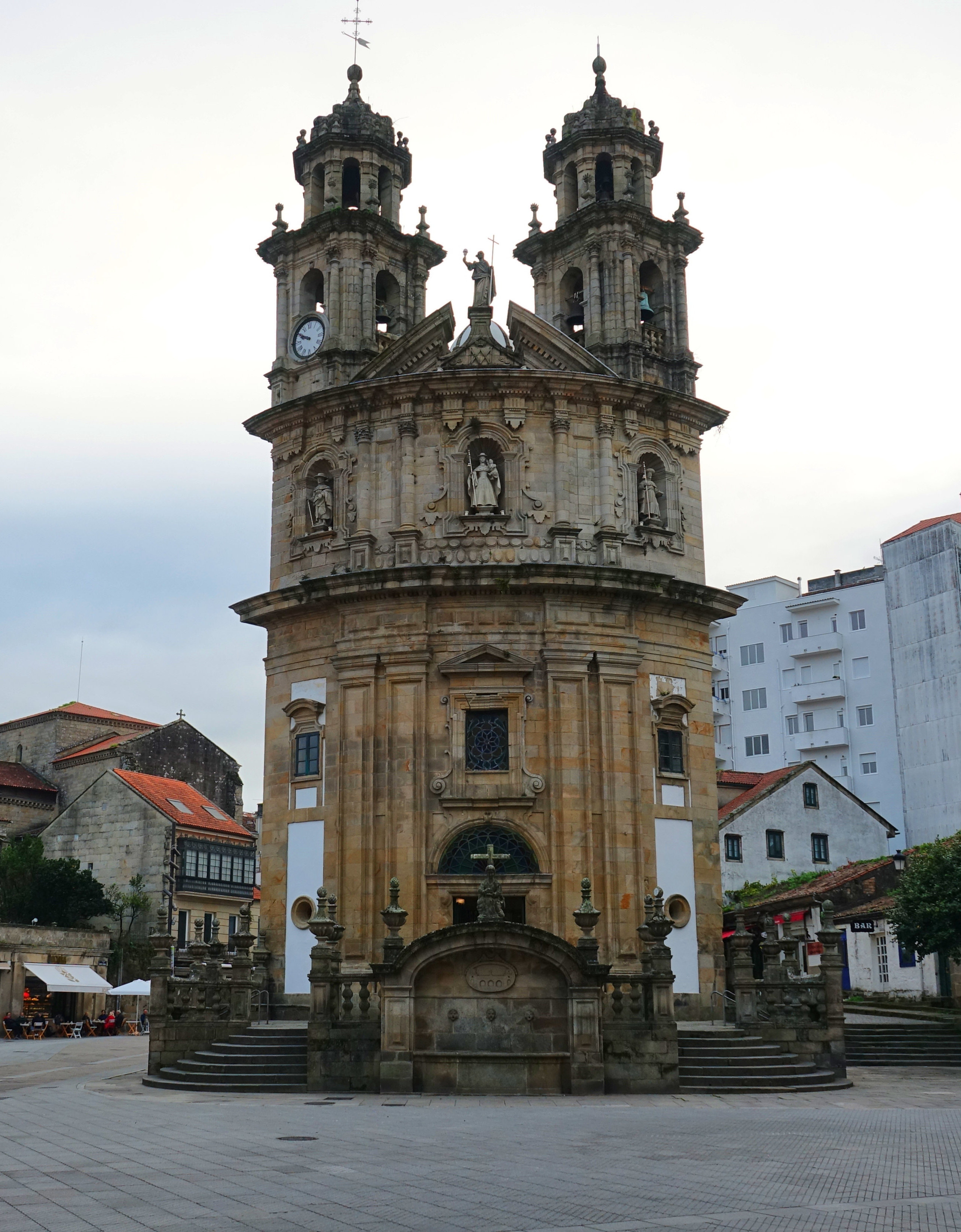
Church of the Pilgrim Virgin, the city symbol

In Pontevedra, the Metrominuto pedestrian plan was created for urban mobility, which with the urban transformation of the city has won many national and international awards such as the international European INTERMODES Urban Mobility Award in 2013 and the 2014 Dubai International Best Practices Award for Sustainable Development awarded by UN-Habitat in partnership with Dubai Municipality. The Metrominuto is a map based on the aesthetics of metro maps, which marks the distances on foot between the most important points of the city and the time it takes to travel them. The Metrominuto has been used as a model in other European cities such as Toulouse in France, Florence, Ferrara Modena and Cagliari in Italy, Poznań in Poland and the Angel district in London. In Spain, it has inspired other cities such Zaragoza, Seville, Cádiz, Salamanca, Granada, Jerez de la Frontera, A Coruña and Pamplona. As a result, 65% of trips in the city centre are made on foot. Pontevedra was recognized in 2016 as one of the 15 best cycling cities in the world. The urban model of the city of Pontevedra follows the models of other European cities such as Amsterdam, Bruges or Copenhagen.

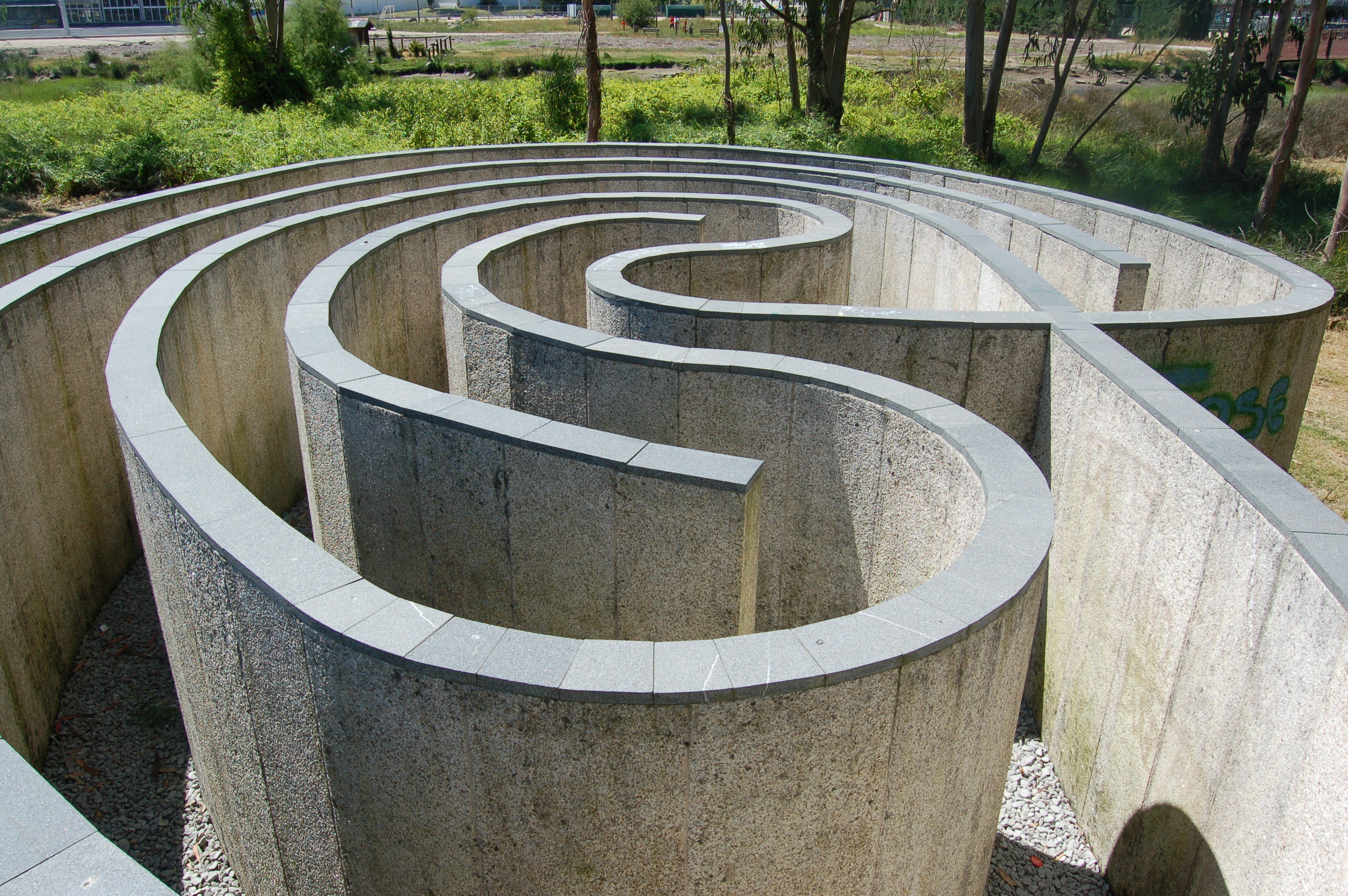
Pontevedra Labyrinth in the Sculpture Island Park

The urban transformation of Pontevedra and measures to reduce motorized traffic in the city centre have reduced the emissions of CO_{2} from fossil fuels in the capital by 67% since 1999 and have been reported by foreign and French television channels such as France 2, France 3, Canal+ or TF1 and the Swiss channel Radio Télévision Suisse RTS and other foreign televisions like Das Erste, NDR1 and ZDF in Germany, MBC TV in South Korea, the Canadian Broadcasting Corporation in Canada or Seven Network in Australia. The city has also been featured in reports by English-language channels and publications such as Bloomberg Television, Fast Company and Outrider (United States) or the Daily Express and The Guardian (United Kingdom).

=== Transport ===
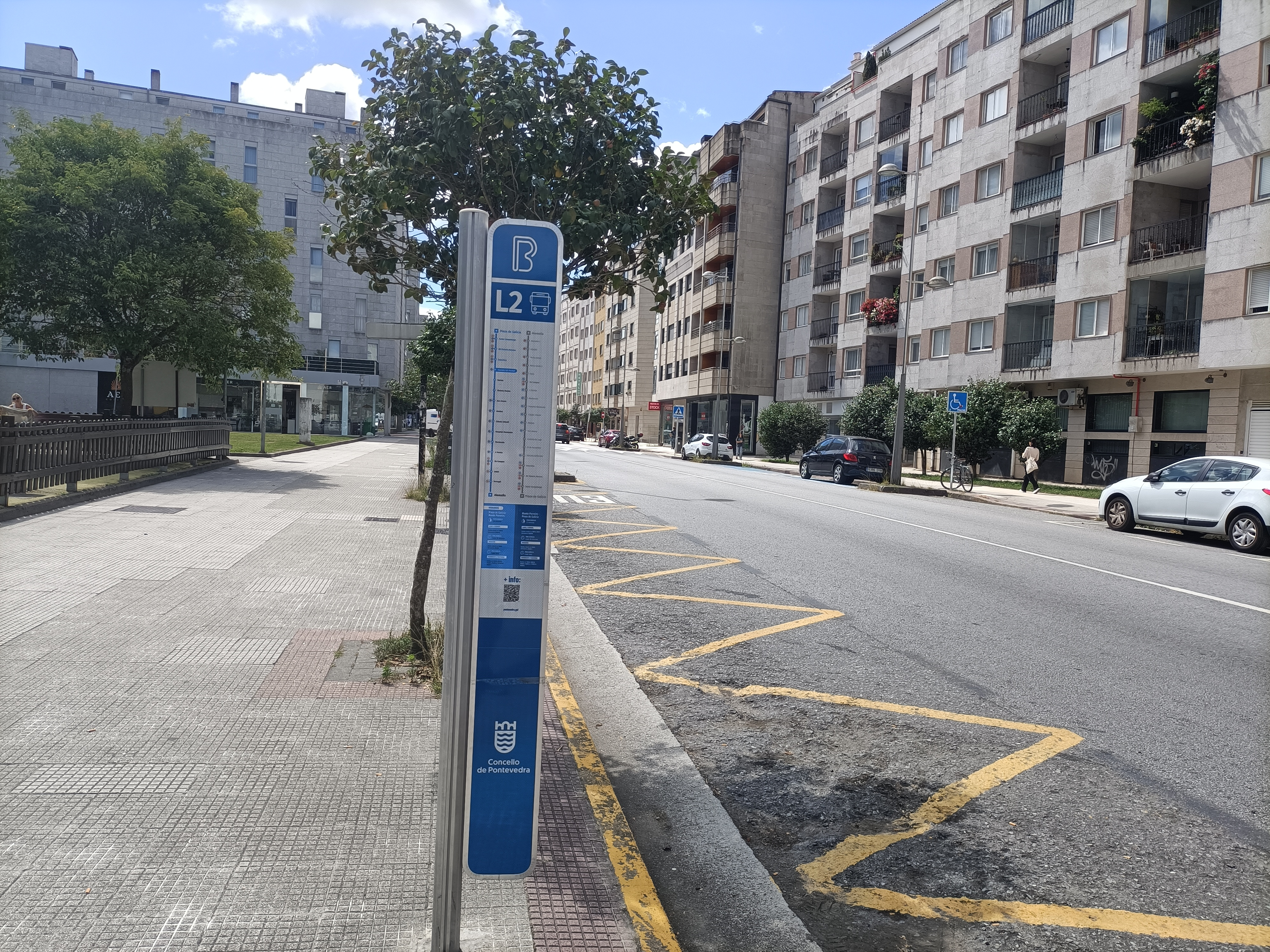
Bus stop on line 2 of the city bus service on Eduardo Pondal avenue.

As regards to public transport, Pontevedra has two urban bus lines in the city centre:

- Line 1 (red), 8.4 kilometres long, connects the Monte Porreiro neighbourhood, one of the most populated in the city with more than 7,000 inhabitants and where the Regional Centre of the National University of Distance Education (UNED) is located, to the A Xunqueira neighbourhood and to the train and bus stations and has 19 stops.
- Line 2 (blue) is 7.6 kilometres long and connects the Monte Porreiro district with the Montecelo Hospital and Galicia Square in the Campolongo district, with 15 stops.

There is also a high frequency urban bus service between Pontevedra and Marín, which is located in the metropolitan area of Pontevedra and with which the city forms a virtual urban continuum.

Pontevedra is well connected by road and rail. It sits on the A Coruña-Tui railway and motorway corridor. Pontevedra bus station has multiple connections with other cities in Spain, Galicia and abroad. Pontevedra railway station is located between the Galician capital Santiago de Compostela (58 km to the north) and the largest Galician municipality, Vigo (30 km to the south). Renfe also has a Pontevedra-University railway stop in the city to serve the A Xunqueira university campus and the Monte Porreiro, Tafisa and A Seca neighbourhoods.

Pontevedra city itself does not have an airport in its own municipality. The nearest airports to the city are the small Vigo-Peinador Airport, located 30.4 km (19 mi) south, Santiago de Compostela-Rosalía de Castro Airport, located 74 km (46 mi) north east, A Coruña Airport, located 129 km (80 mi) to the north of Pontevedra and the most important one and most frequently used, the Porto-Francisco Sá Carneiro Airport, located 160 km (99 mi) to the south.

A network of roads and motorways efficiently connects Pontevedra with the other Galician cities, and also with Portugal (55 km to the south), and inland (100 km to the eastern city of Ourense). Regular bus lines link Pontevedra with other Galician cities and towns, as well as with Madrid, Porto and Lisbon (among others).

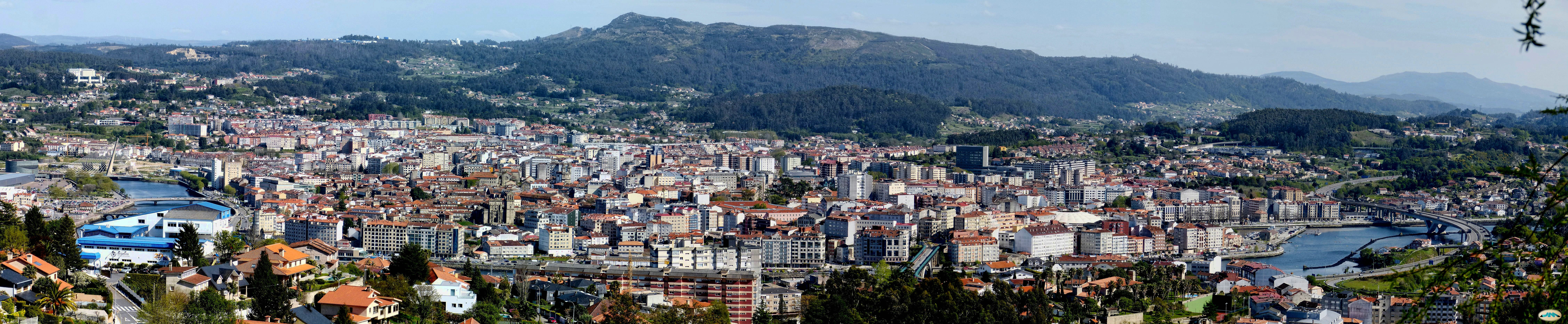
The city of Pontevedra, seen from The Caeira neighbourhood

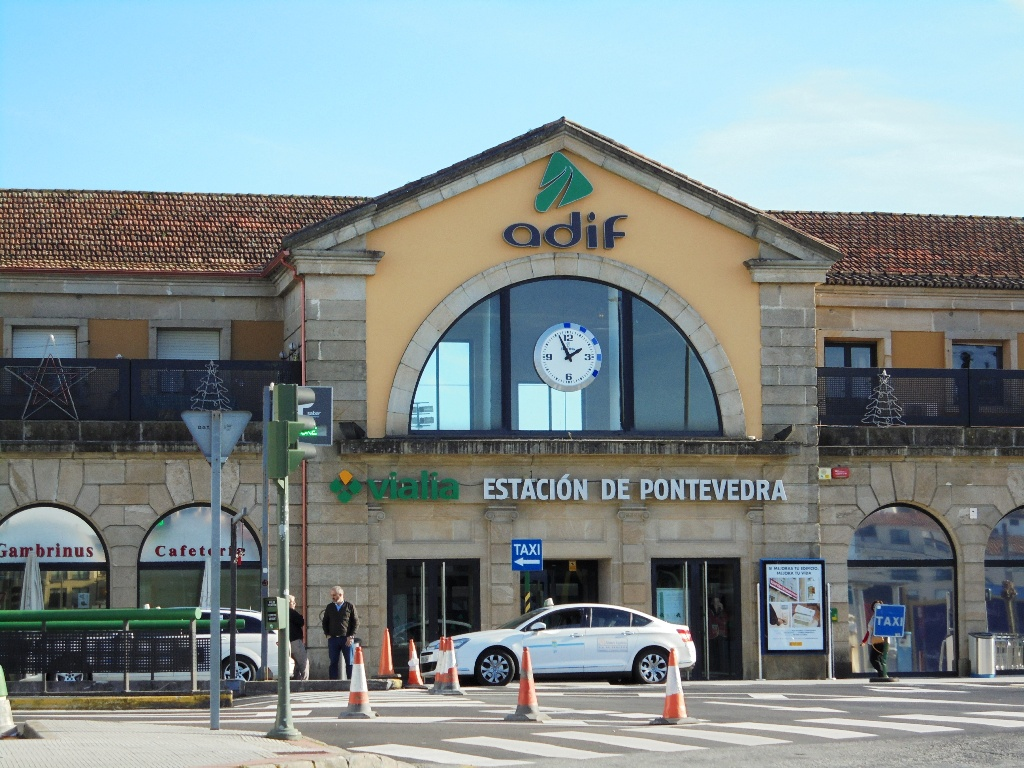
Pontevedra railway station

The AVE high-speed train (in Spanish Tren de alta velocidad, or TAV) reaches Pontevedra and the city is a stop on the "Atlantic Line", running from the northern Galician city of A Coruña to Lisbon (Portugal). Likewise, Pontevedra will benefit from the high-speed train connecting Galicia and central Spain. That Galician connection will be fully operational in 2022.

Despite the fact that Pontevedra was once the main Galician port, at present the Pontevedra harbour is only used for recreational purposes, not for cargo or passenger transportation. Neighbouring Marín, 7 km away, is a major military and commercial harbour. The Pontevedra marina is close to the old town and the commercial and fishing port of Marín and Ria de Pontevedra, 5 kilometres west of the city centre.

== Landmarks ==
Because of the old town, the surrounding landscape and its former medieval port, Pontevedra has been popular among tourists. Tourist attractions include many religious and civil buildings as well as medieval squares.

=== Religious heritage ===
- Baroque church of the Pilgrim Virgin. The major symbol of the city, it is on the Place of the Pilgrim Virgin. Built on a semi-circular scallop plan, it is the only rounded scallop-shaped church in Spain.
- Gothic-Renaissance Basilica of St. Mary Major. Built as a guild church by the powerful sailors' guild. It has a remarkable flattened facade.

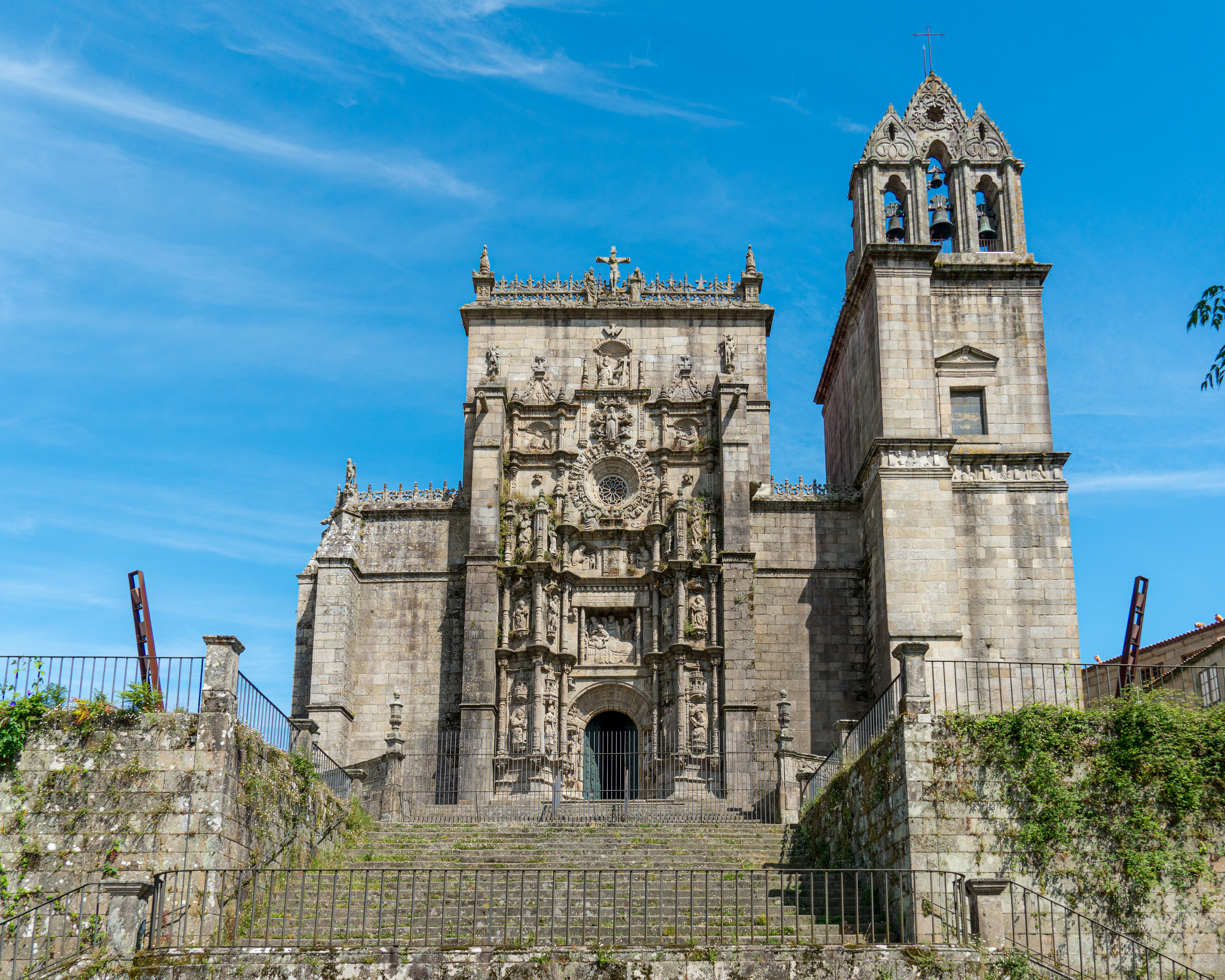
Renaissance Basilica of Saint Mary Major (Pontevedra)

- Convent and church of Saint Francis, Pontevedra. Gothic church of St. Francis overlooking the Herrería Square. It is one of the mendicant-style churches in Galicia. Its plan is a Latin cross, with a single nave and a chevet with three polygonal apses. The church houses the tomb of the admiral and poet Payo Gómez Chariño, which dates from the 13th century.
- Ruins of the Gothic church of St. Dominic, having belonged to the Dominican order, only the chevet with five polygonal chapels remains. Today they belong to the Pontevedra Museum.

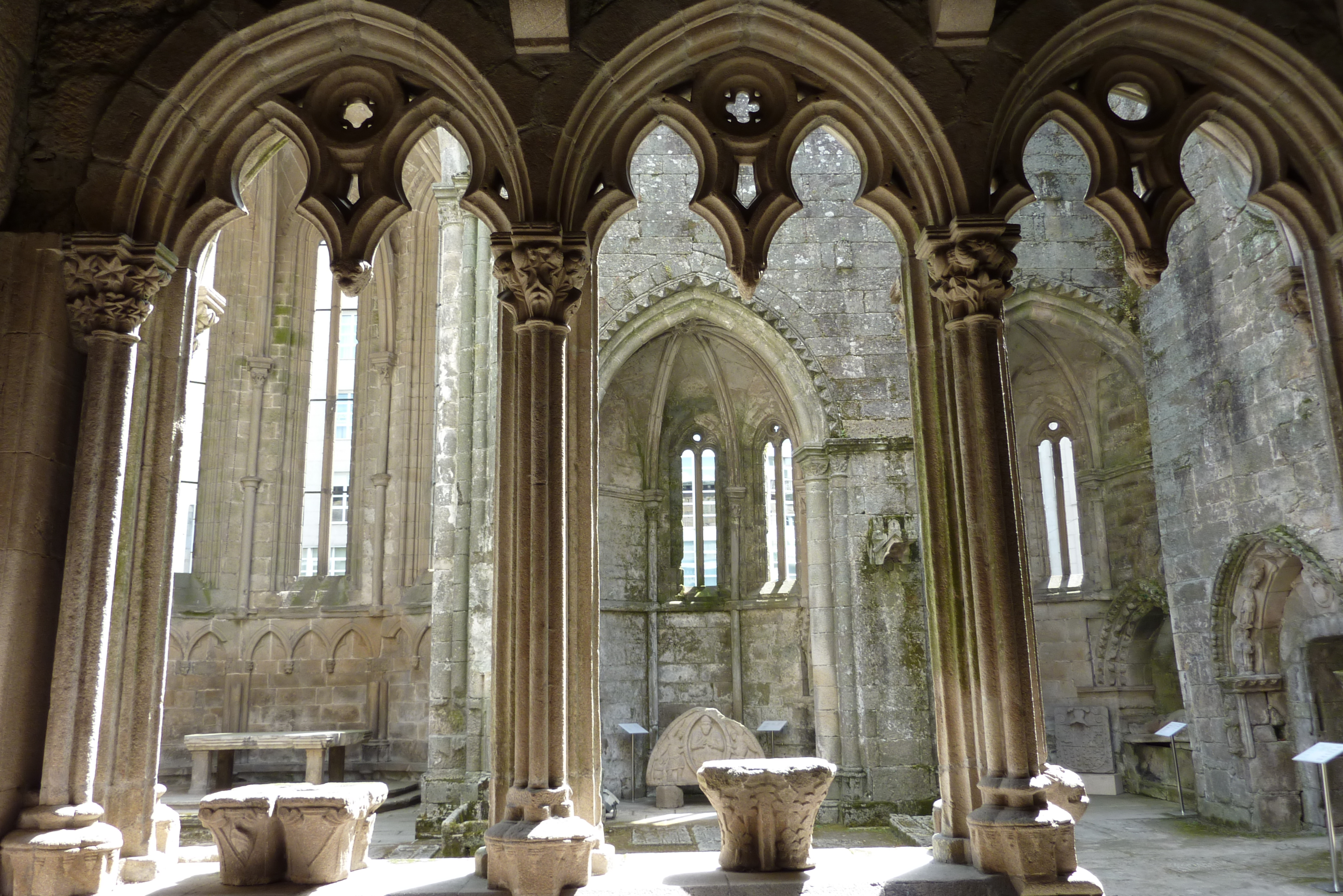
Gothic Santo Domingo Church

- Baroque church of St. Bartholomew (Italian baroque).

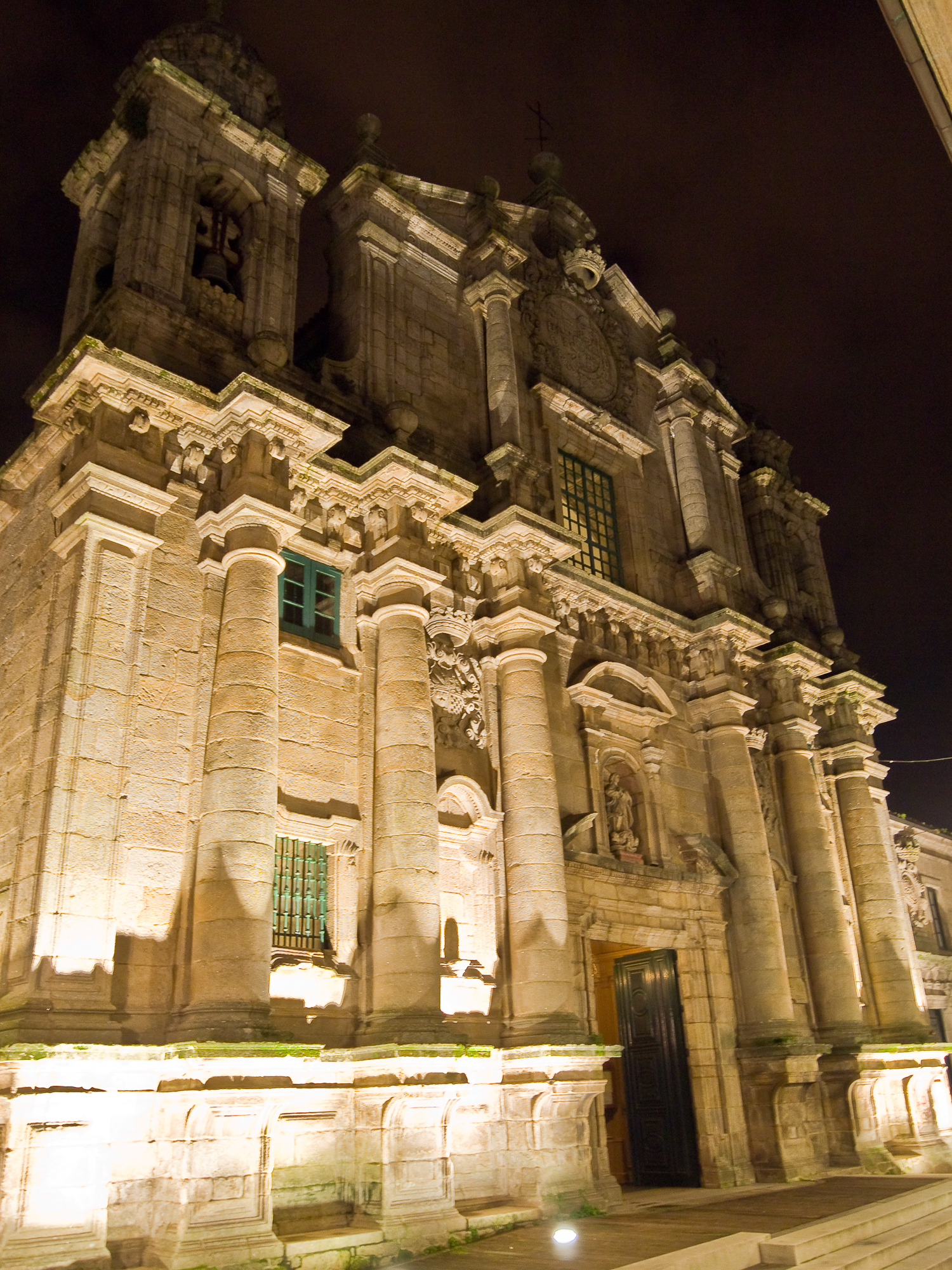
Baroque San Bartolomé church.

- Convent and Romanesque-Gothic church of St. Clare.
- Apparitions Sanctuary, where the Virgin of Fatima appeared to Sister Mary Lucia of Jesus and the Immaculate Heart of Fatima.
- Nazarene Chapel (Baroque, S.XIV-XVIII).
- Chapel of the Holy Souls (Neo-Gothic, S.XIX).
- Chapel of Saint Roch (Neoclassical, S.XIX).
- Saint-Francis Convent.
- Monastery of Saint-Saviour of Lérez, a Baroque reanimation on a picturesque site. This former Benedictine monastery has a church (from the 18th century) whose facade is flanked by two towers. Adjacent to the church is one of the galleries of the former Renaissance cloister of the 16th century.

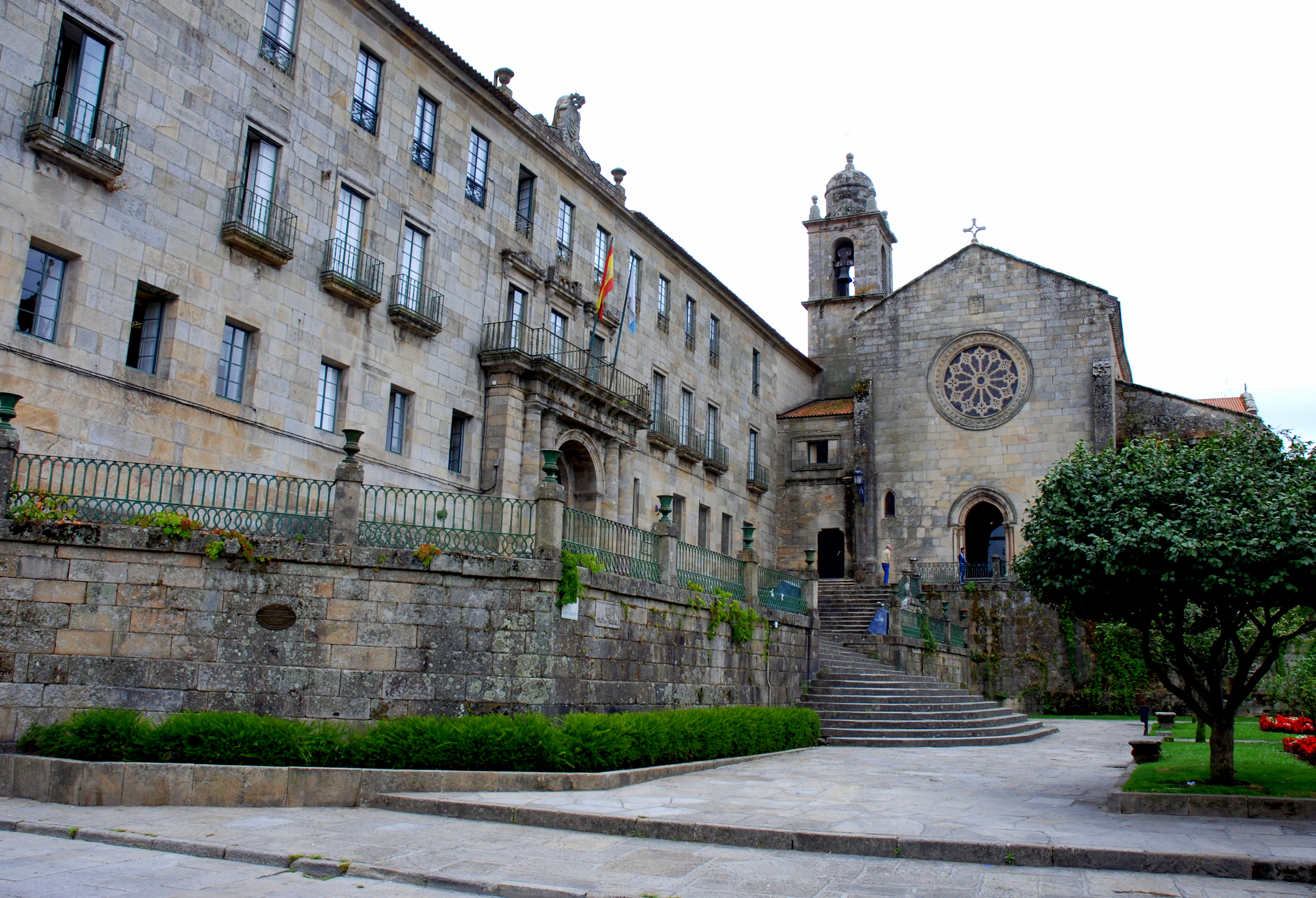
Church of San Francis Monastery

- Our Lady of Placeres church built at the end of the 19th century in Neo-Gothic style.
- College of the Society of Jesus in Pontevedra, 1714, Italian baroque architecture.
- Monastery of St. John of Poio.

=== Civil Heritage ===
- House of the Bells, Gothic, from the 15th century, with a heron in the coat of arms, Don Filiberto Street.

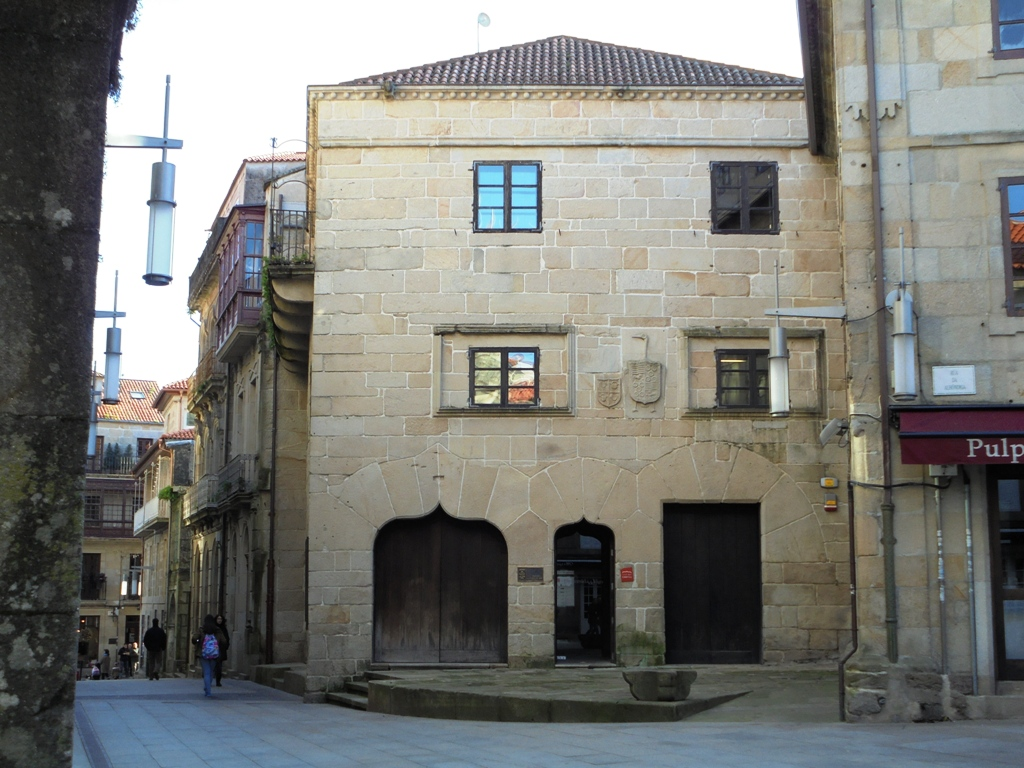
Gothic Bells House

- Vaamonde House, Gothic-Renaissance, Amargura street, 16th century.
- Old Mail House, late Gothic, in Celso García de la Riega Square.
- Remnants of the medieval ramparts.12th–15th century.
- Counts of Maceda Palace or Barón Palace, Renaissance building from the 16th century, with a crenellated tower, now converted into a Parador.

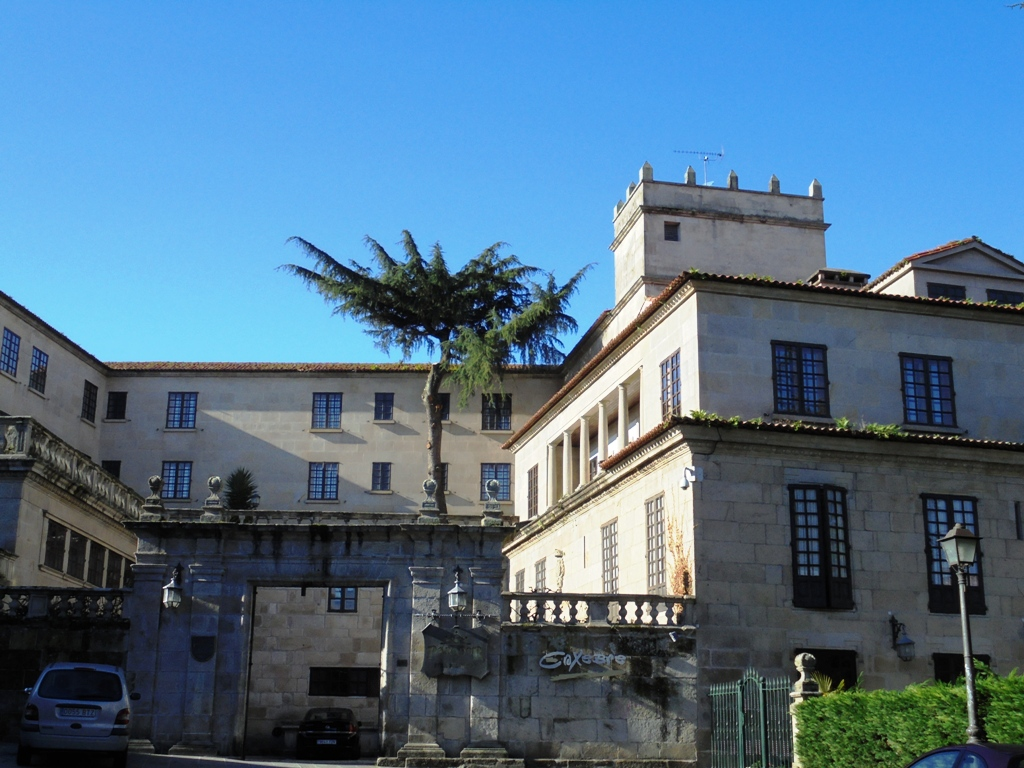
Pazo of the Counts of Maceda, Parador de Pontevedra

- Palace of the Gago and Montenegro (16th century), in the square of Teucer, with a magnificent coat of arms in granite.
- House of Heads, with Renaissance busts on the facade, on the Estrella Square.
- Mugartegui Palace, baroque, from the 18th century, on Mugartegui Square or the Quarry Square.

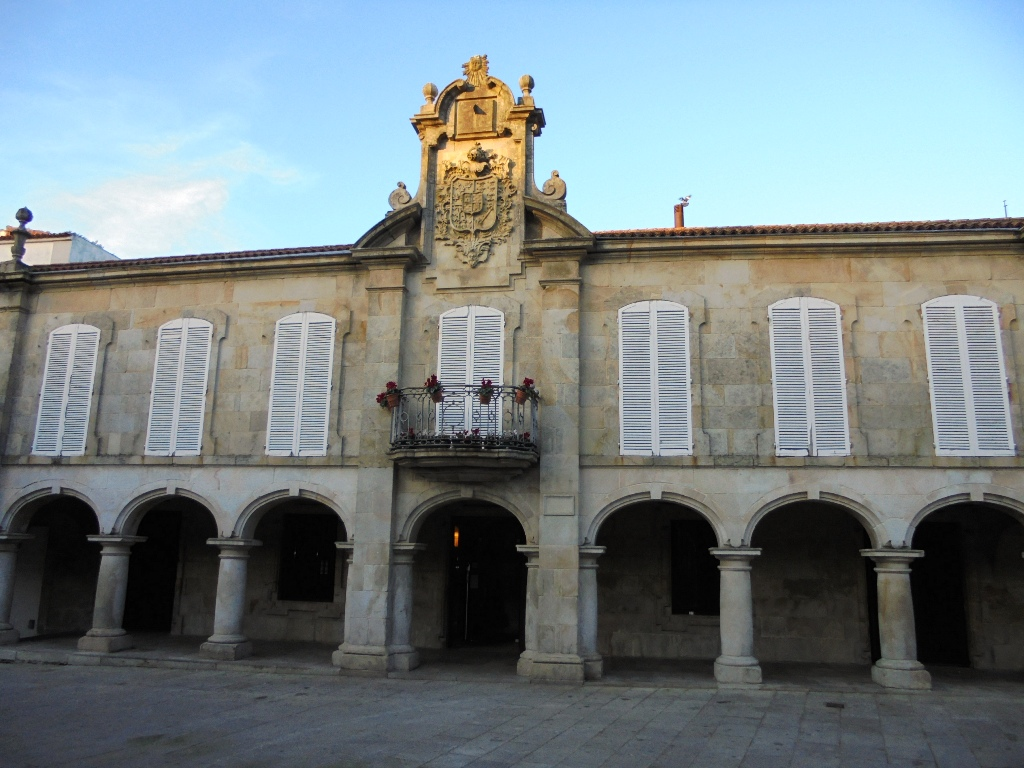
Baroque Mugartegui Palace

- Pazo de Castro Monteagudo, baroque (1760).
- Pazo de García Flórez, baroque, from the 18th century, in Sarmiento street, with a magnificent granite coat of arms.
- Palace of the Marquis of Aranda, baroque, from the 18th century to the crenellated tower at the corner of the square of Teucer.

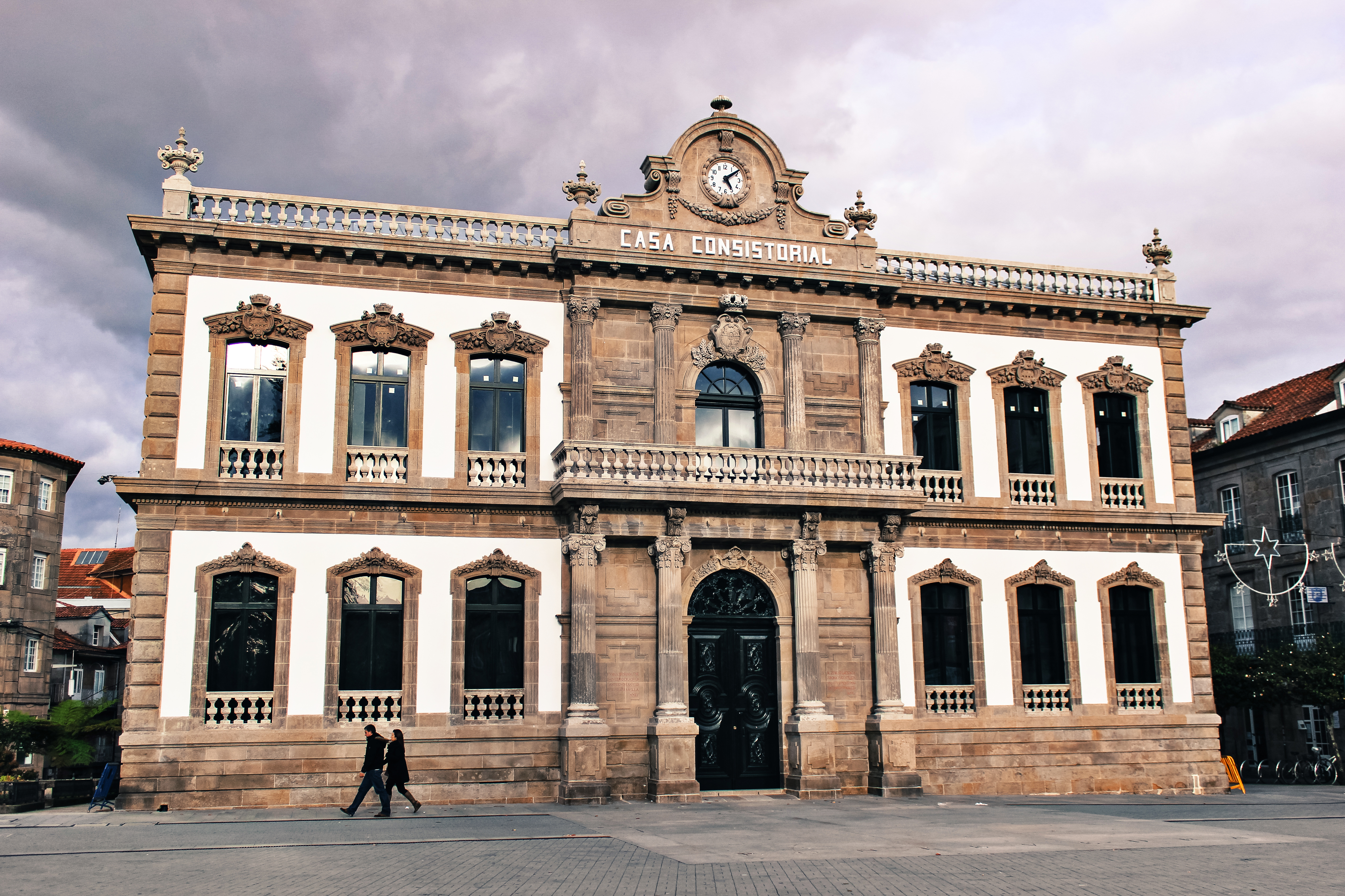
Pontevedra City Hall, 19th century

- House of the Barbeito and Padrón, baroque with Renaissance busts on the façade, from the 18th century, Real Street.
- Liceo Casino, neoclassical, 1878.
- Principal Theatre of Pontevedra, neoclassical.
- Pontevedra City Hall, 19th century, of Parisian inspiration.
- The Palace of the Provincial Council of the 19th century, eclectic.
- Mansion house of the Mendozas, eclectic, on the Saint-Mary avenue, (1880).
- Gobierno Militar de Pontevedra, by Alejandro Sesmero (1892).
- Mansion of the Marquis of Riestra, eclectic, in Michelena Street, 30, (end of the 19th century).
- Lourizán Palace (art nouveau), (end of the 19th century).
- Pontevedra Provincial Hospital, by León Domercq and Siro Borrajo (1897).
- Pontevedra former training teacher college building, eclectic, end of 19th century
- Pontevedra bullring (1900)
- Modern Coffee (art nouveau), 1902 on St. Joseph's square.
- Bank of Spain, Michelena street, eclectic, 1903.
- Villa Pilar private mansion (art nouveau), 1905 Marquis of Riestra street.
- Former Saint Ferdinand Barracks, (1906–1909)
- Fonseca House, neoclassical, on Paseo of Colón. Its facade is inspired by the church of the Paris Madeleine, (end of the 19th century).
- Valle-Inclán High School (art nouveau), (1905–1926), Gran Vía de Montero Ríos Avenue.
- Central Post Office building (art nouveau), beginning of the 20th century, Oliva Street and García Camba Street.
- Gran Garaje Building, art nouveau, (1915) in Benito Corbal Street.
- Building of the Official Association of Building Engineers and Technical Architects of Pontevedra, in the Muelle Square.
- Pontevedra Provincial Savings Bank (1944) by Emilio Quiroga Losada.
- Pontevedra Central Market (1948) by Emilio Quiroga Losada.
- Palace of Justice of Pontevedra (1956) by Robustiano Fernández Cochón and Germán Álvarez de Sotomayor y Castro.
- Gobierno Civil de Pontevedra (1958) by Enrique López-Izquierdo Blanco.
- Pontevedra Municipal Sports Hall (1965) by Alejandro de la Sota.
- Pontevedra Public Library (1988) by Julio Simonet Barrio.
- Congres Hall Palace (1997) by Manuel de las Casas.
- Pontevedra Exhibition Centre (1998) by Manuel de las Casas.
- A Parda Courts Building (1998), by Fernando Martínez Sarandeses.
- Faculty of Communication of Pontevedra (2000), by José Carlos Arrojo Lois.
- Faculty of Education and Sport of Pontevedra (2006), an example of architecture in an exhibition at the Museum of Modern Art of New York (MOMA) in 2006. The design of the faculty, by Jesús Irisarri Castro and Guadalupe Piñera, won the SICE prize in 2008, awarded by the Spanish Superior Council of Architects.
- Administrative Complex of Pontevedra, the twin-tower administrative building of the Galician Government (2008) by the architect Manuel Gallego Jorreto.
- Castelao Building of the Pontevedra Museum (2013), a great building of contemporary architecture, by the architects Eduardo Pesquera and Jesús Ulargui.
- New Courthouse (2019). The façade of the building is designed with curved bevelled surfaces and serial openings.

=== Monuments ===
- Monument to the heroes of Puente Sampayo, in the Plaza de España, beginning of the 20th century
- Valle-Inclán statue, beginning of the 21st century
- Tertulia Monument (Literary Circle in Modern Coffee), on St. Joseph's square, beginning of the 21st century
- Teucer statue, on St. Joseph's square, beginning of the 21st century
- The Fiel contraste, in Alhóndiga street, beginning of the 21st century
- Ravachol statue, beginning of the 21st century
- Dorna, beginning of the 21st century
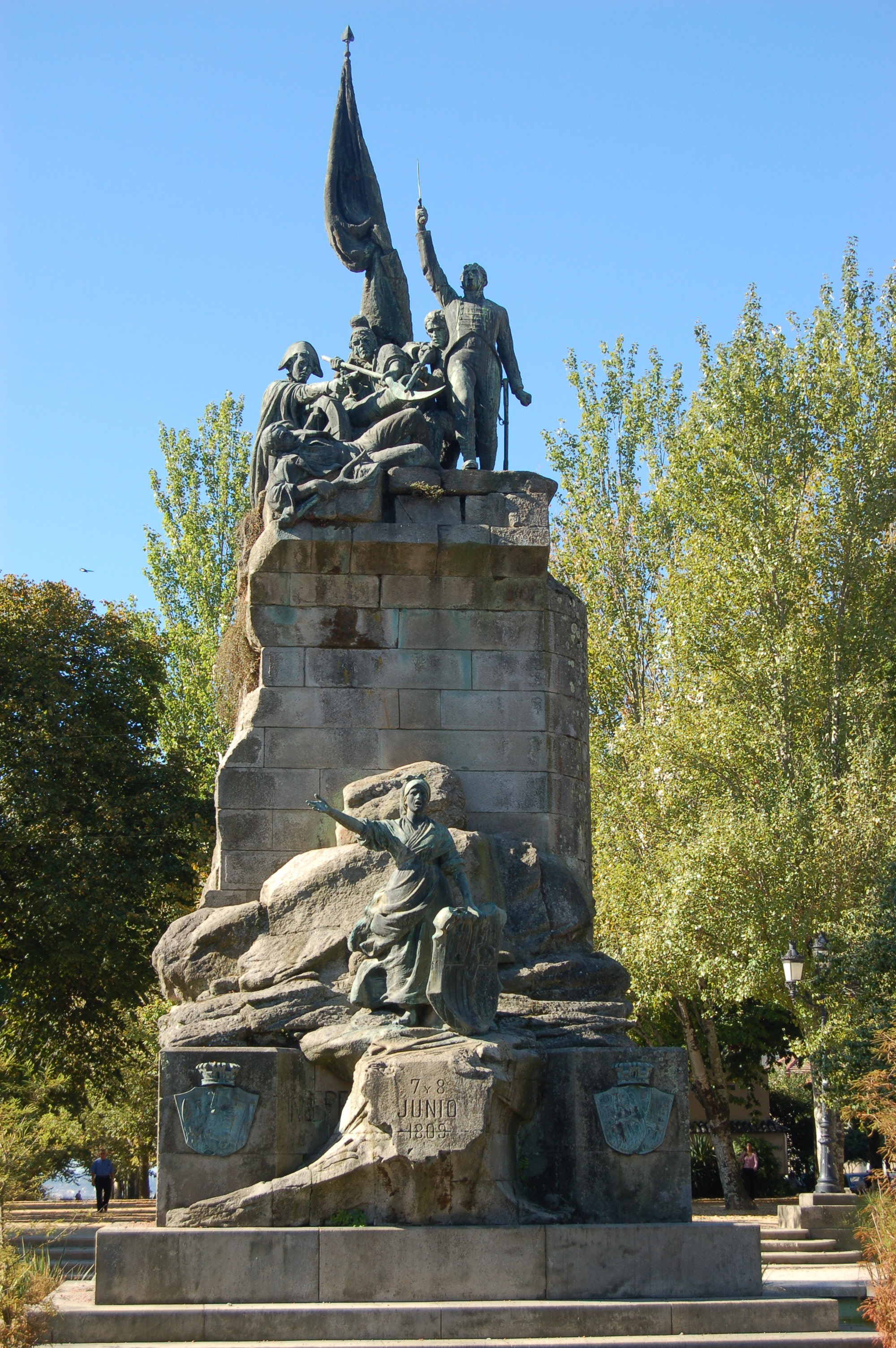
Monument to the heroes of Puente Sampayo

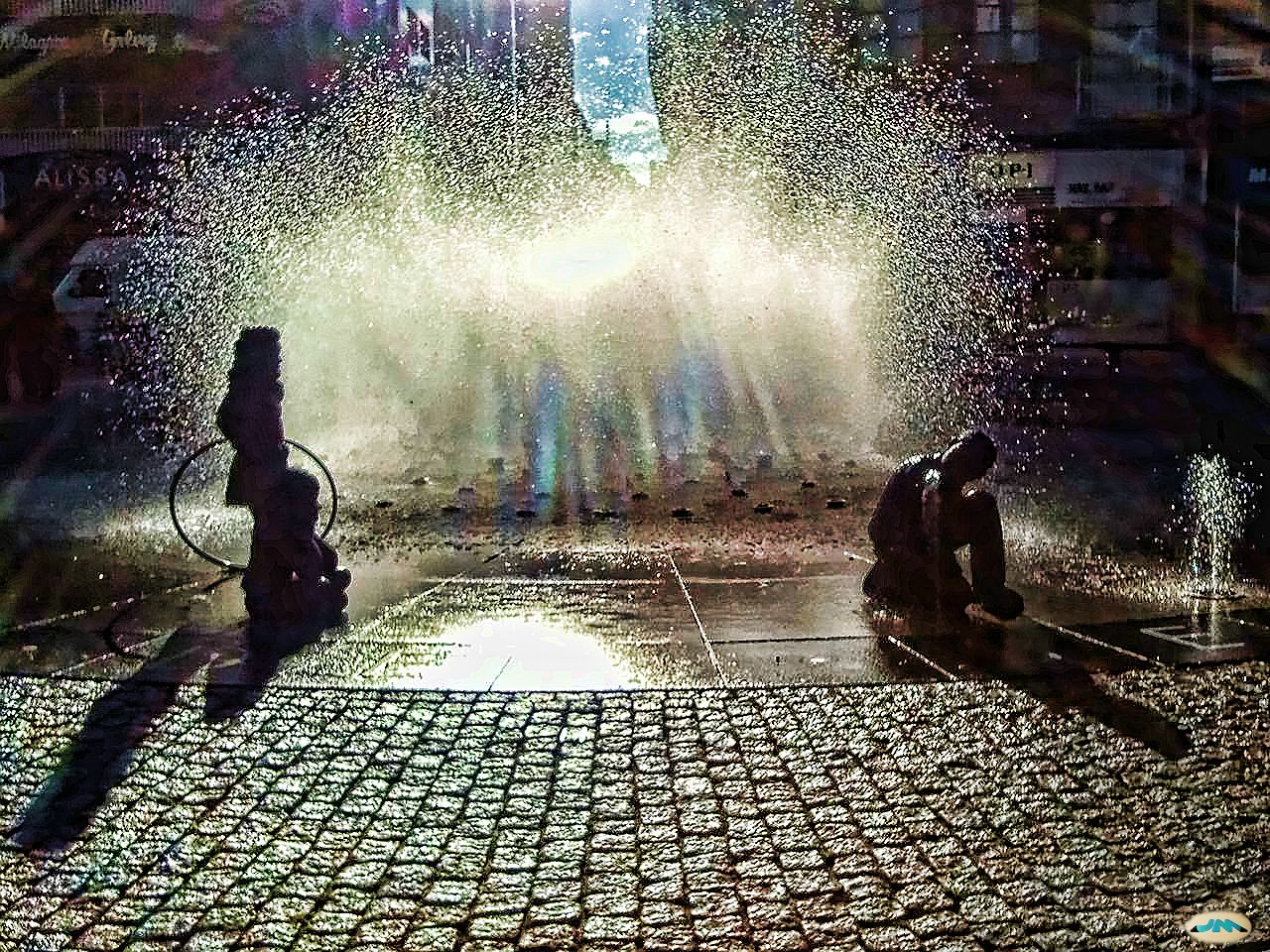
Children's fountain

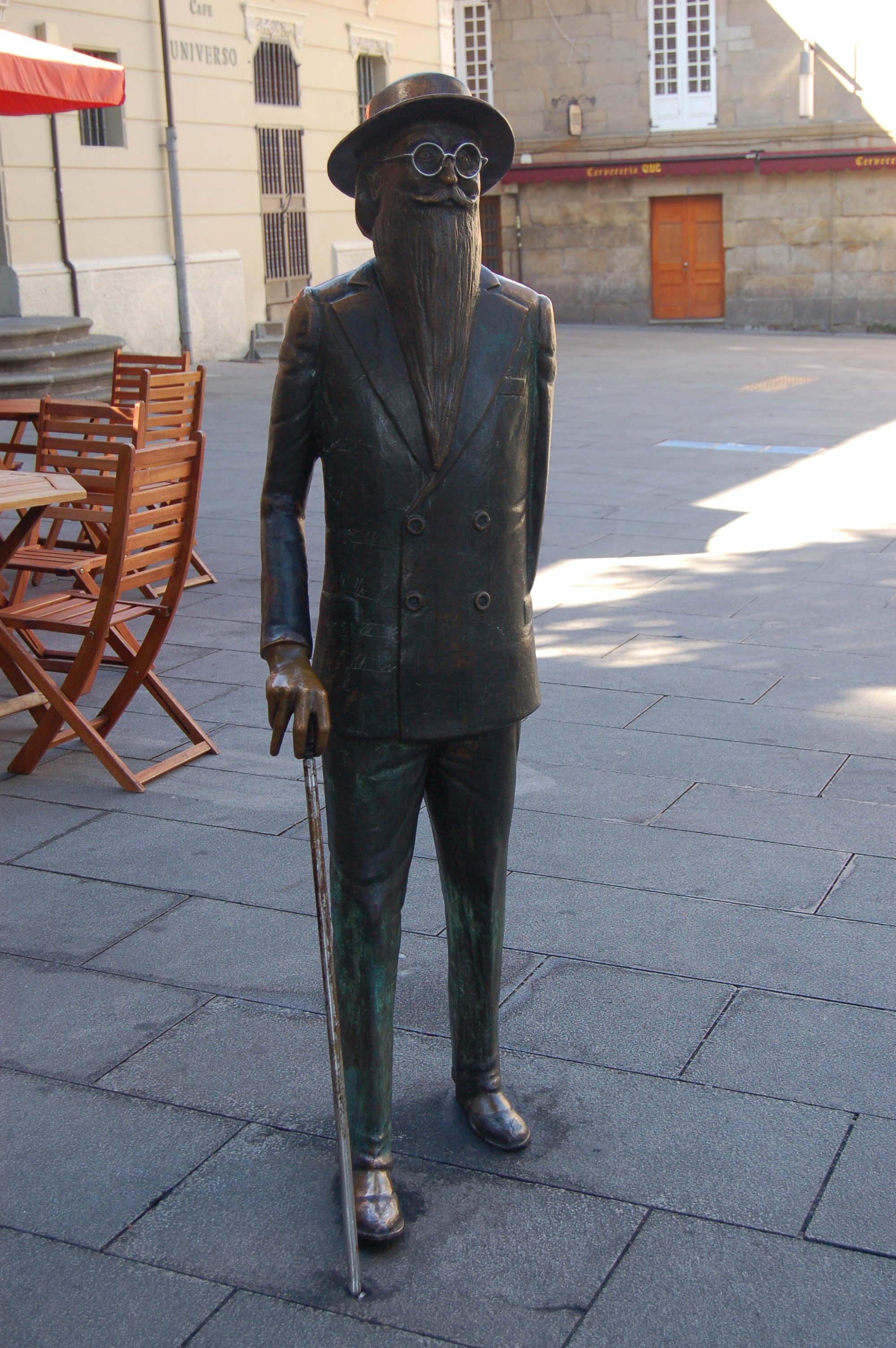
Valle-Inclán statue on Méndez Núñez square

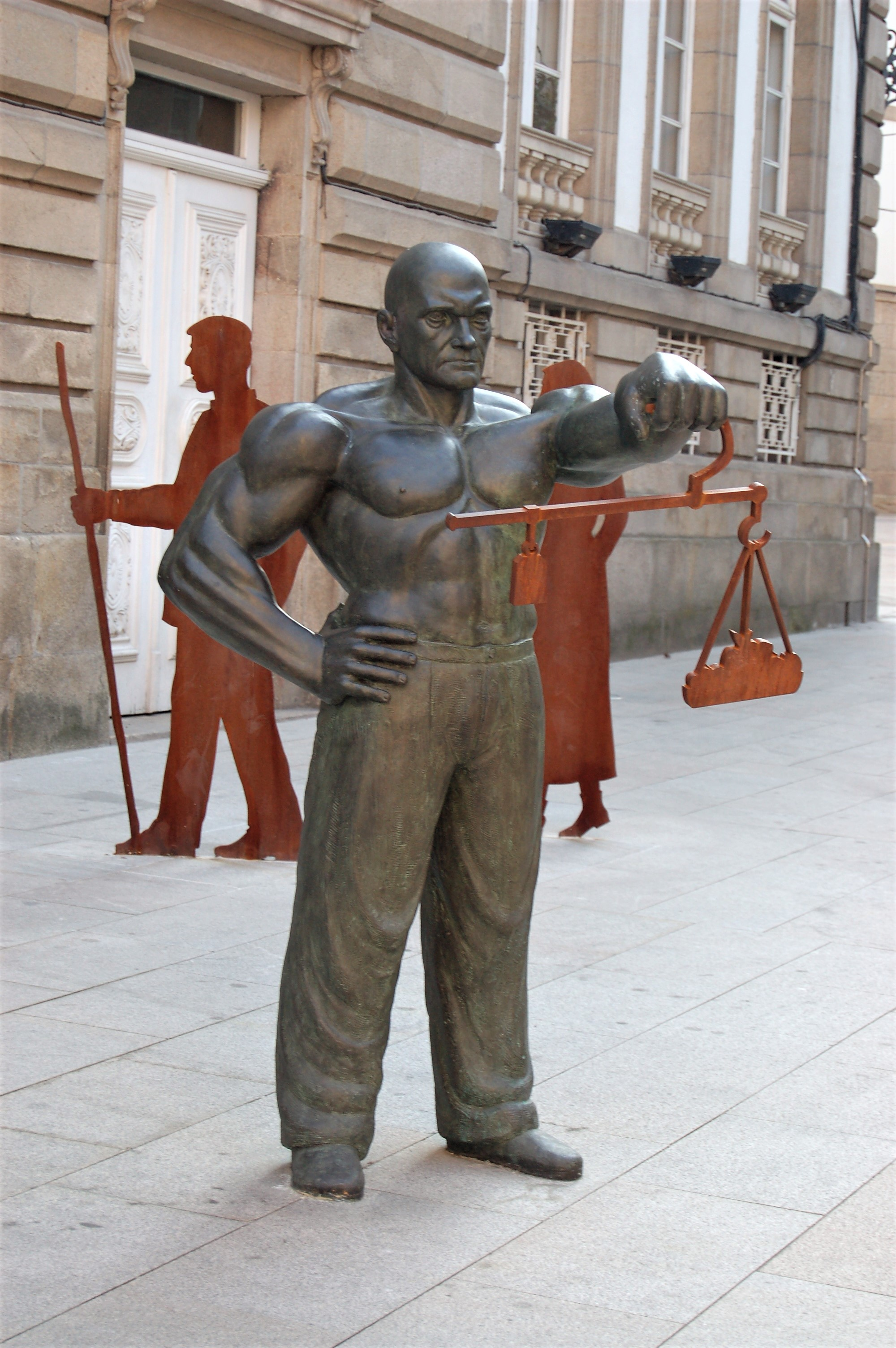
The Fiel contraste

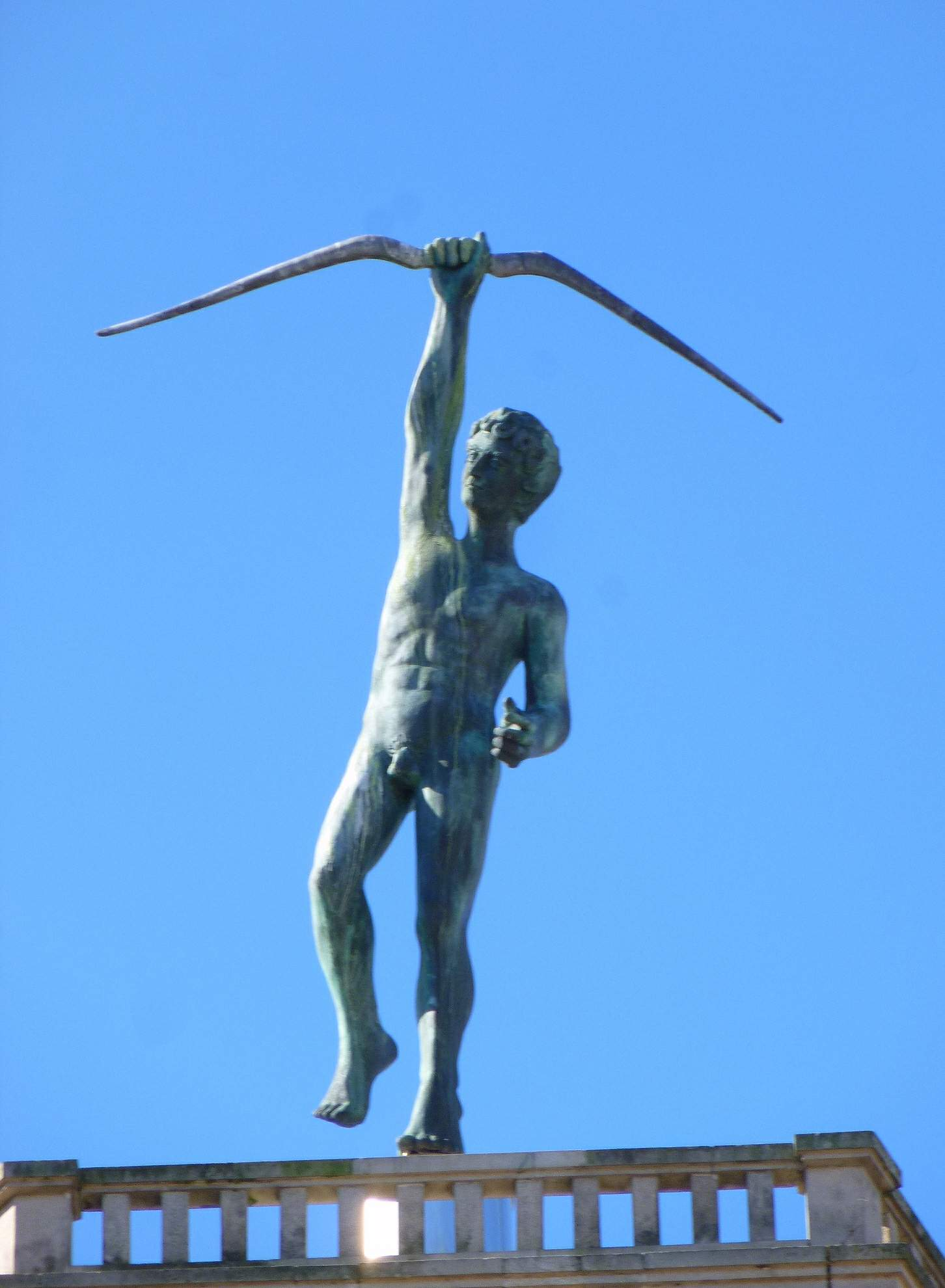
Teucer statue on St. Joseph's square

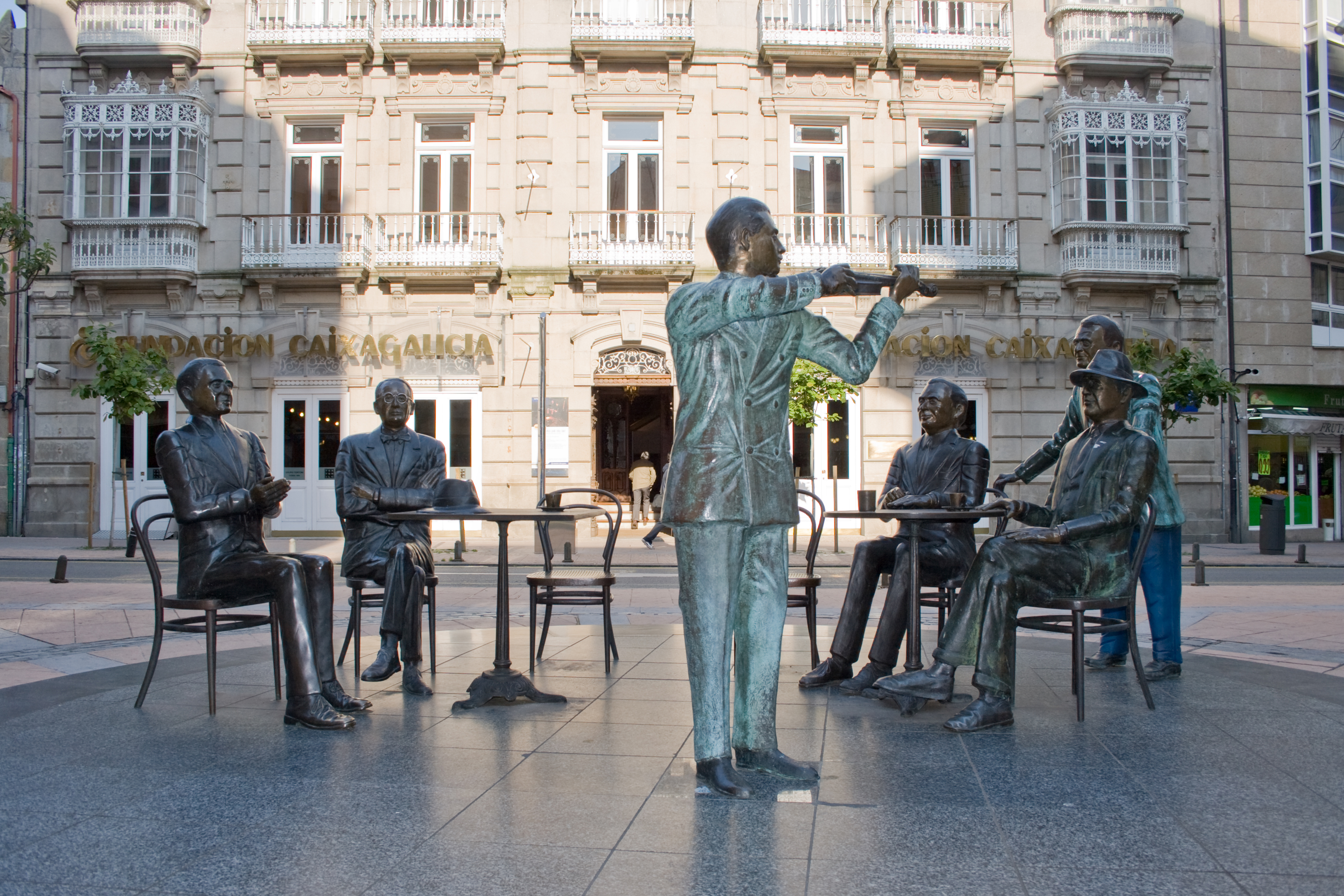
Tertulia Monument (Literary Circle in Modern Coffee)

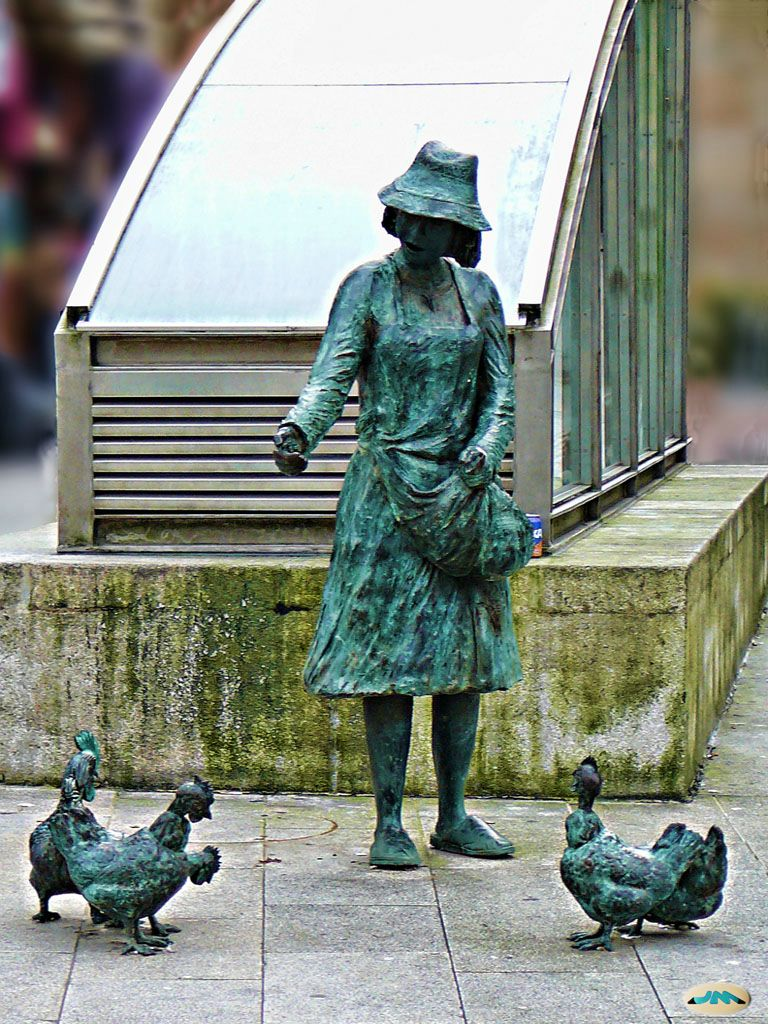
Woman with chickens

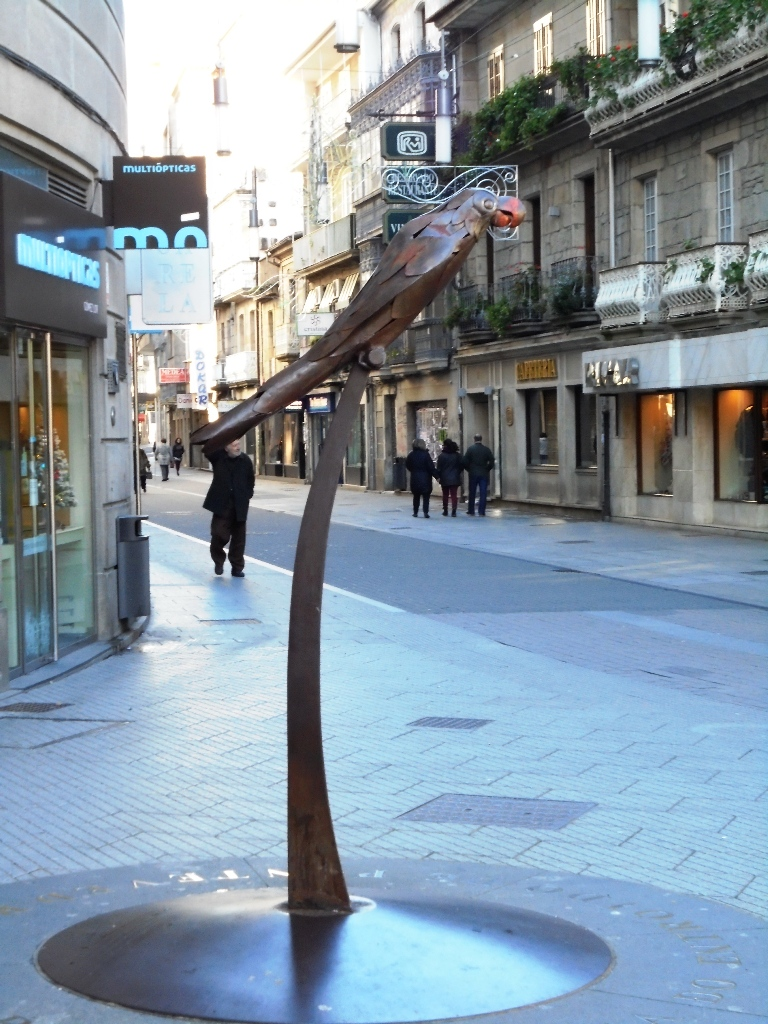
Ravachol Parrot

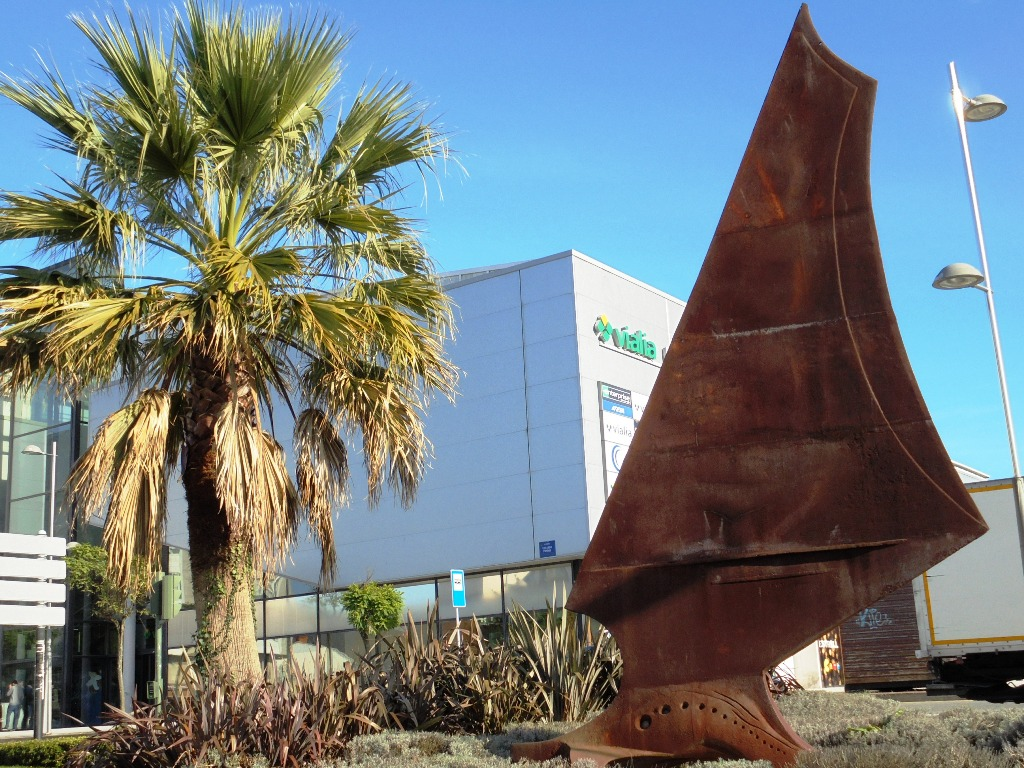
Dorna

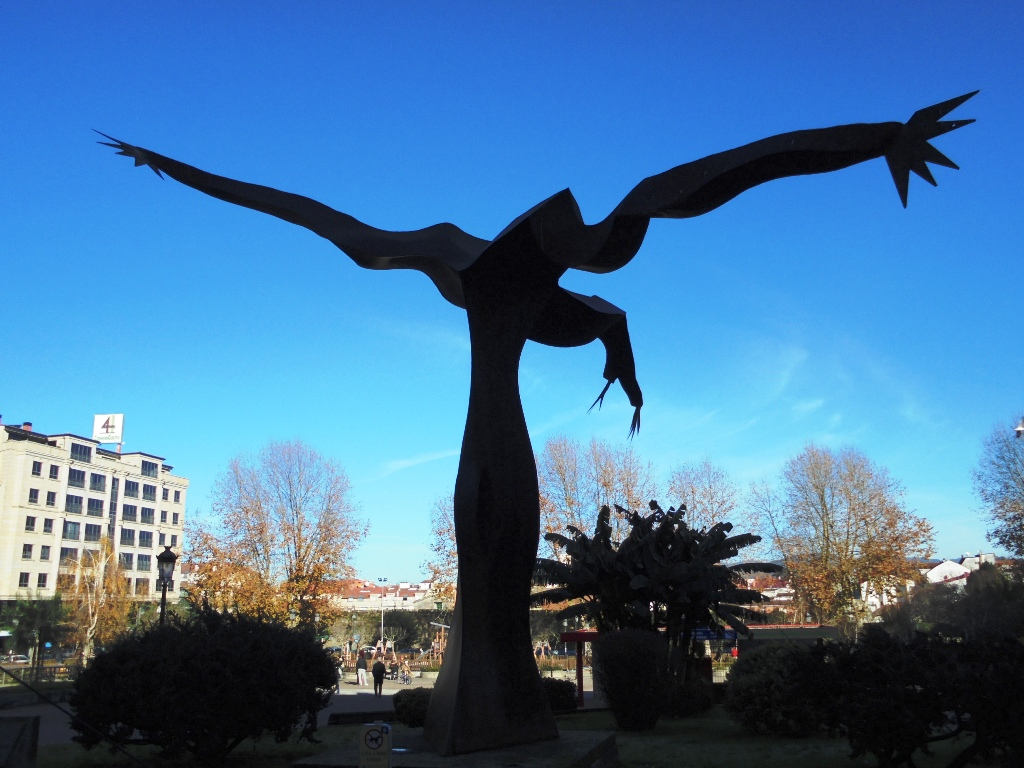
Tree monument

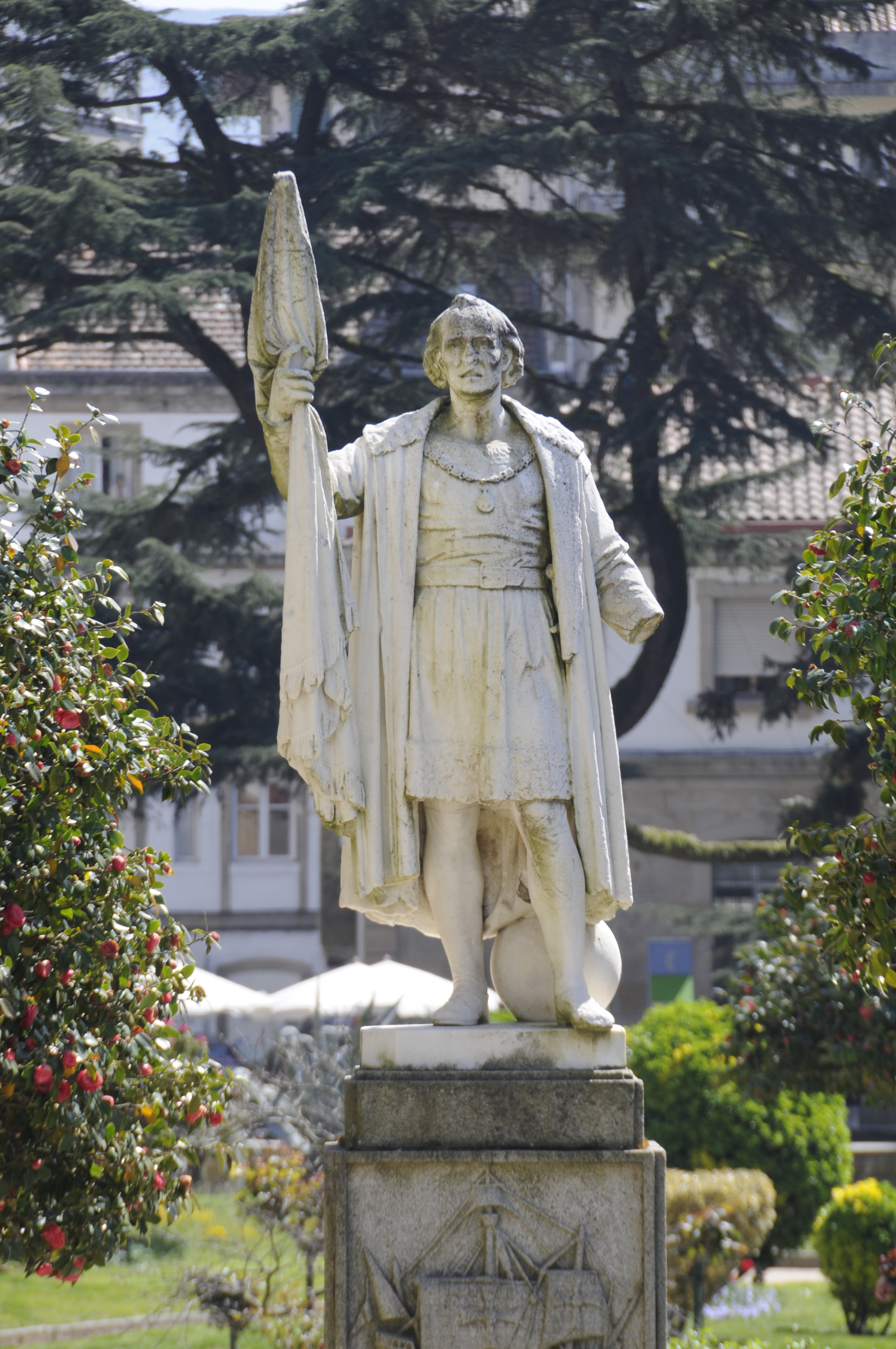
Christopher Columbus

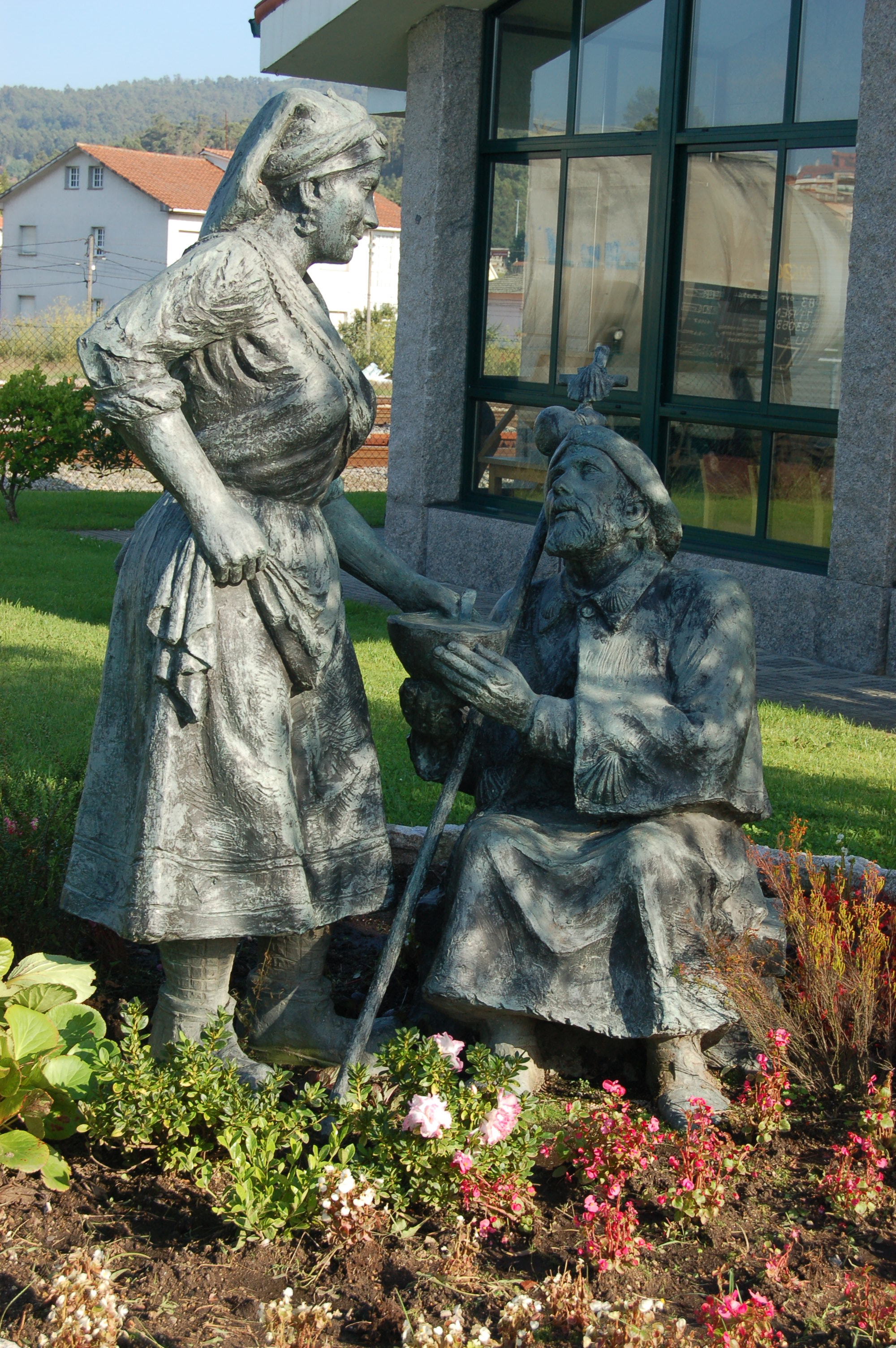
Dando de comer al peregrino

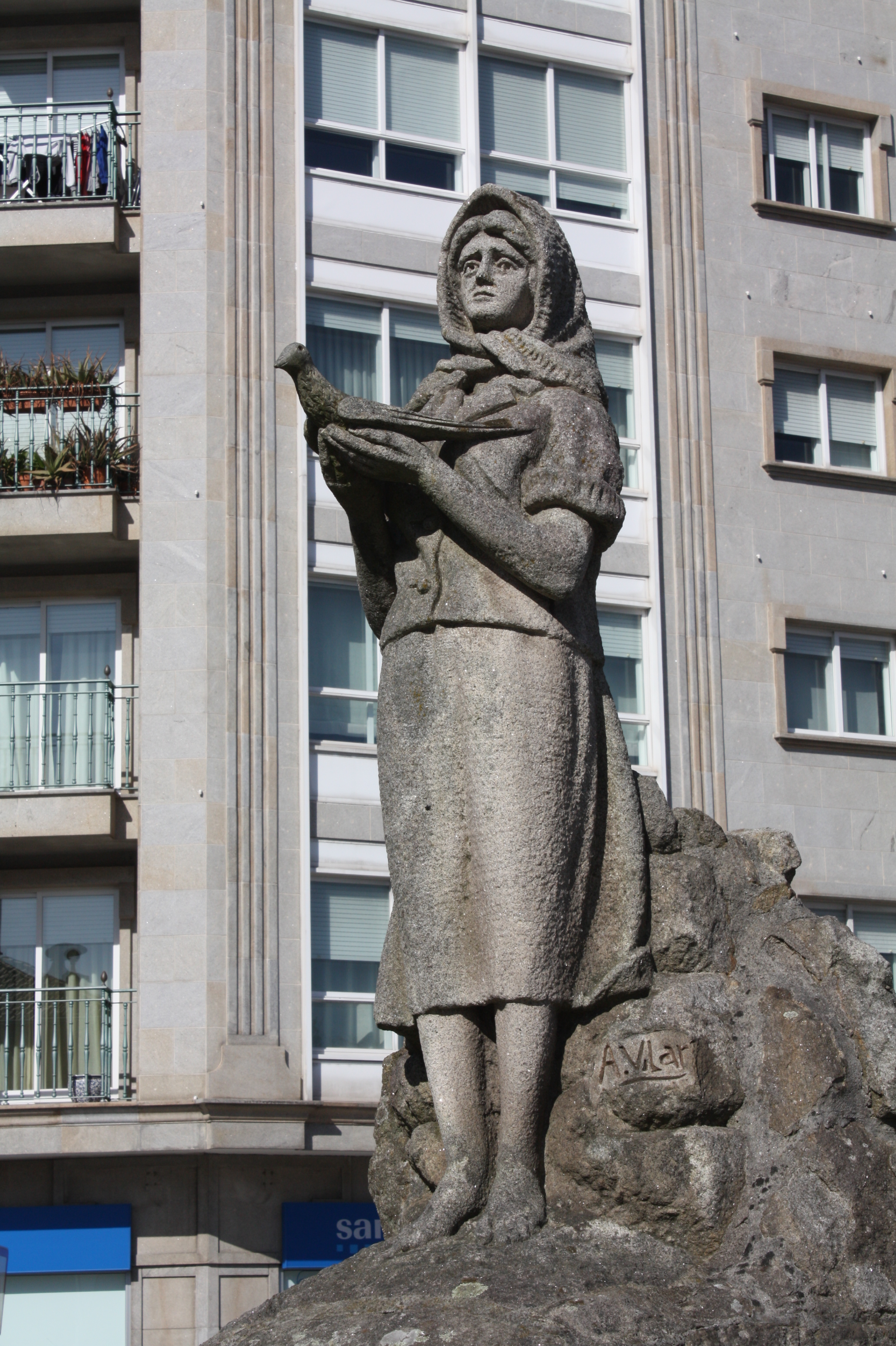
Monument to the woman of the emigrant

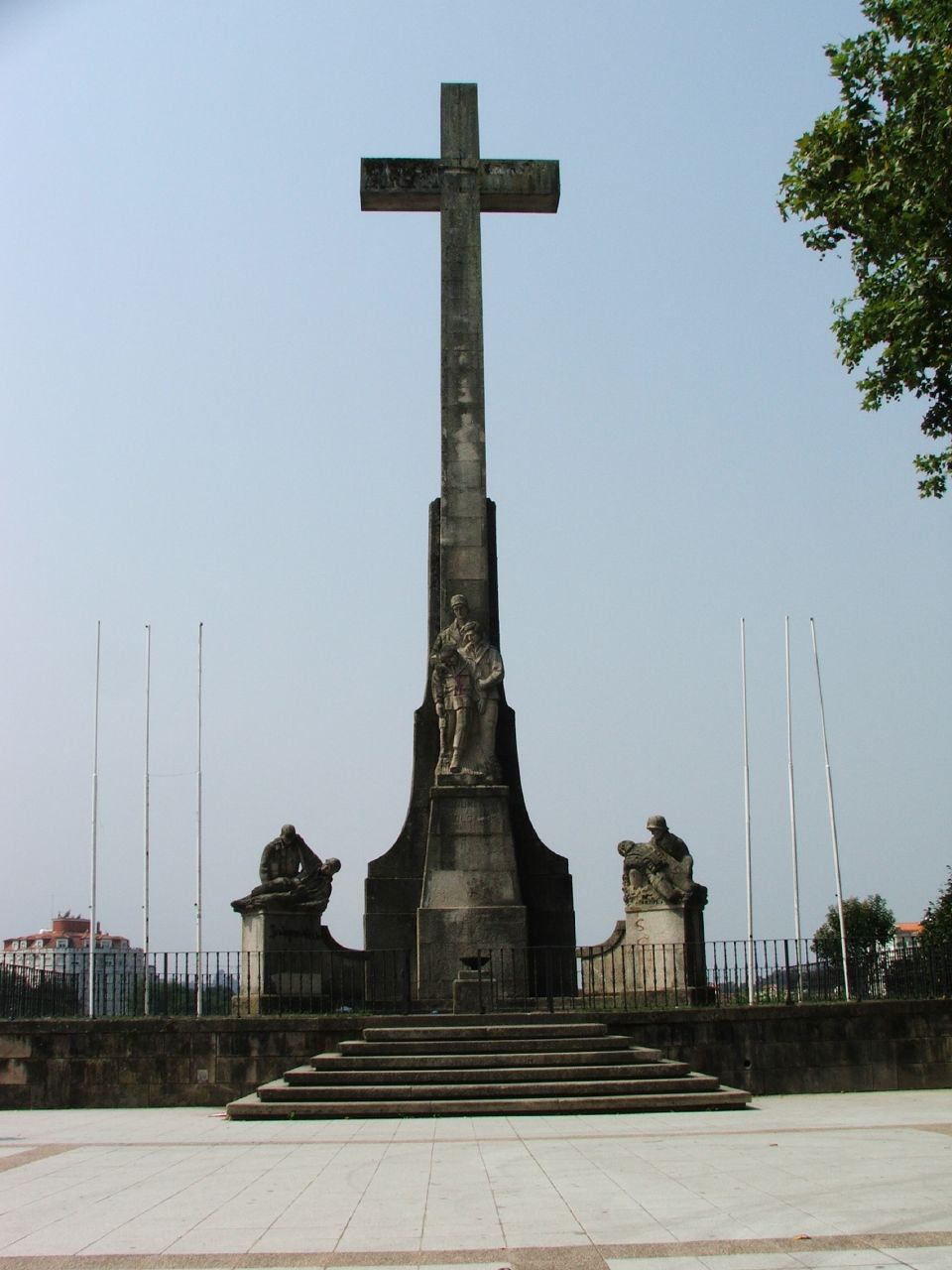
Soldier's monument

=== Bridges ===
- Medieval Burgo Bridge, from the 12th century. The bridge that gave the name to the city.
- Barca Bridge, from the end of the 19th century.
- Santiago Bridge, beam bridge, 1983.
- Tirantes Bridge (Tie-rod bridge or Strap bridge), cable-stayed bridge, 1995.
- Currents Bridge, tied-arch bridge, 2012.
- Word Bridge, delta-leg bridge in the Monte Porreiro district, 2011.
- Ria Bridge, rigid frame bridge with V-shaped legs and a box girder road bridge, 1992.
- Puente Sampayo Bridge, from the 11th-18th centuries.

=== Picturesque medieval squares ===
The medieval squares of the old town of Pontevedra and those of its first urban expansion stand out as small rooms with regular and geometric proportions. Many of them evoke with their trade names the activities that took place centuries ago: Plaza of firewood, vegetables, the stone quarry, the blacksmith's, the quay...

Plaza de la Herrería
Blacksmith's square is the main square of the city; it is the most popular because of the daily crowds. With arches in two of its ends, with the gardens of the Plaza of Orense and the Herrería fountain at the corner of the church and convent of St. Francis. It is lined with camellias typical of the Rias Baixas. It owes its name to the blacksmiths who, in the 15th century, tempered the iron in the ovens and forges of its arcades for the weapons and paving stones that the Catholic Monarchs had asked them to manufacture. It was the place where the Feira Franca was held, granted to the city by King Henry IV. Here you will find the historic Carabela coffee shop, and other traditional coffees such as Savoy.

Plaza de la Peregrina
In the heart of the pedestrian centre of Pontevedra, the Pilgrim Virgin Square is the city's main meeting point. It is presided over by the Church of the Pilgrim Virgin and was located outside the walls, very close to the Trabancas gate of the old Pontevedra wall. This is where the pillory where the prisoners were executed was located.

Teucer square

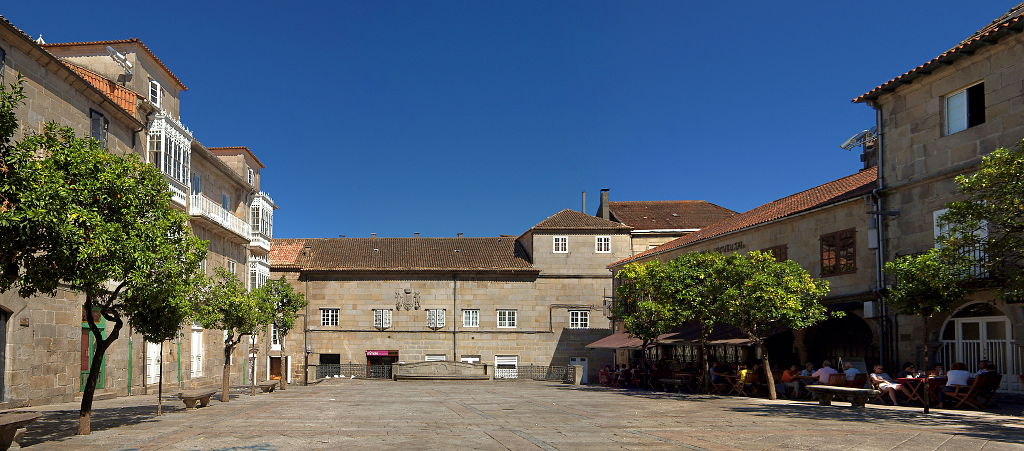
Teucer square

With perfect geometric dimensions and framed by orange trees, it is surrounded by noble buildings, with the 18th-century Gago and Montenegro Palace standing out on the north side, where the great coat of arms of 1716 is to be seen on the façade. On the east side, overlooking Royal Street, there is a stone fountain with night lighting.

Plaza de la Leña
The Firewood Square is the most representative and picturesque typical Galician square in Galicia. With a calvary in its centre and popular houses with arcades on one side and the Baroque houses of the Pontevedra Museum on the other. It owes its name to the firewood that was sold here in the past to heat Pontevedra's kitchens.

Plaza de la Verdura
Regularly proportioned, on the Vegetables square there are houses with coats of arms and a 19th-century forge fountain. This is where the House of Light is located, which commemorates the fact that Pontevedra was the first Galician city to have electricity in the 19th century. Today it is the headquarters of the Pontevedra Tourist Office. The square is very lively, to which the atmosphere of the many Galician taverns and tapas bars contributes.

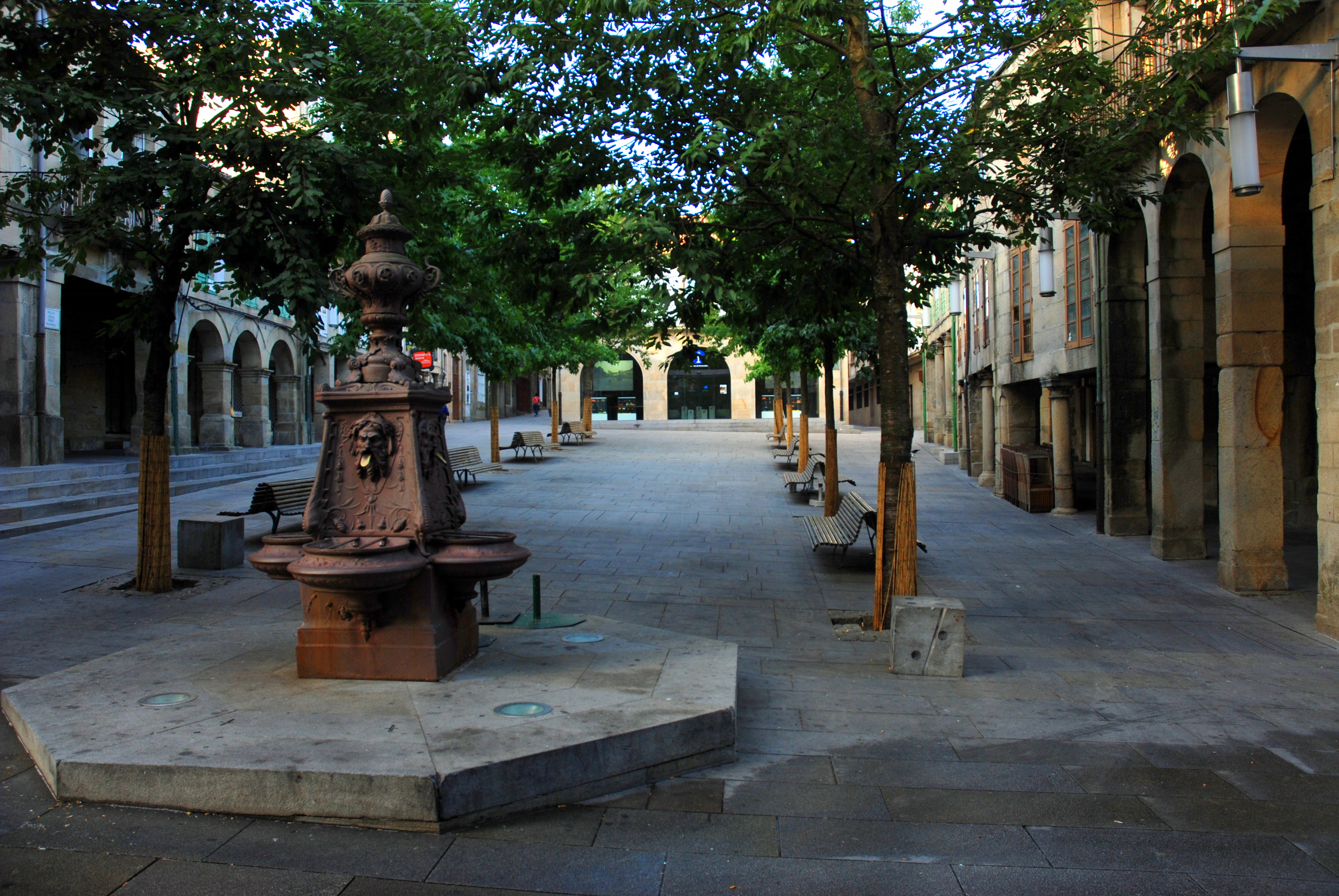
Verdura square

Plaza de la Pedreira
The Stone Quarry square is so called because of the stone-cutting activities developed here by stonemasons for the city's works and constructions. Also called Plaza of Mugartegui, because of the baroque mansion in its center.

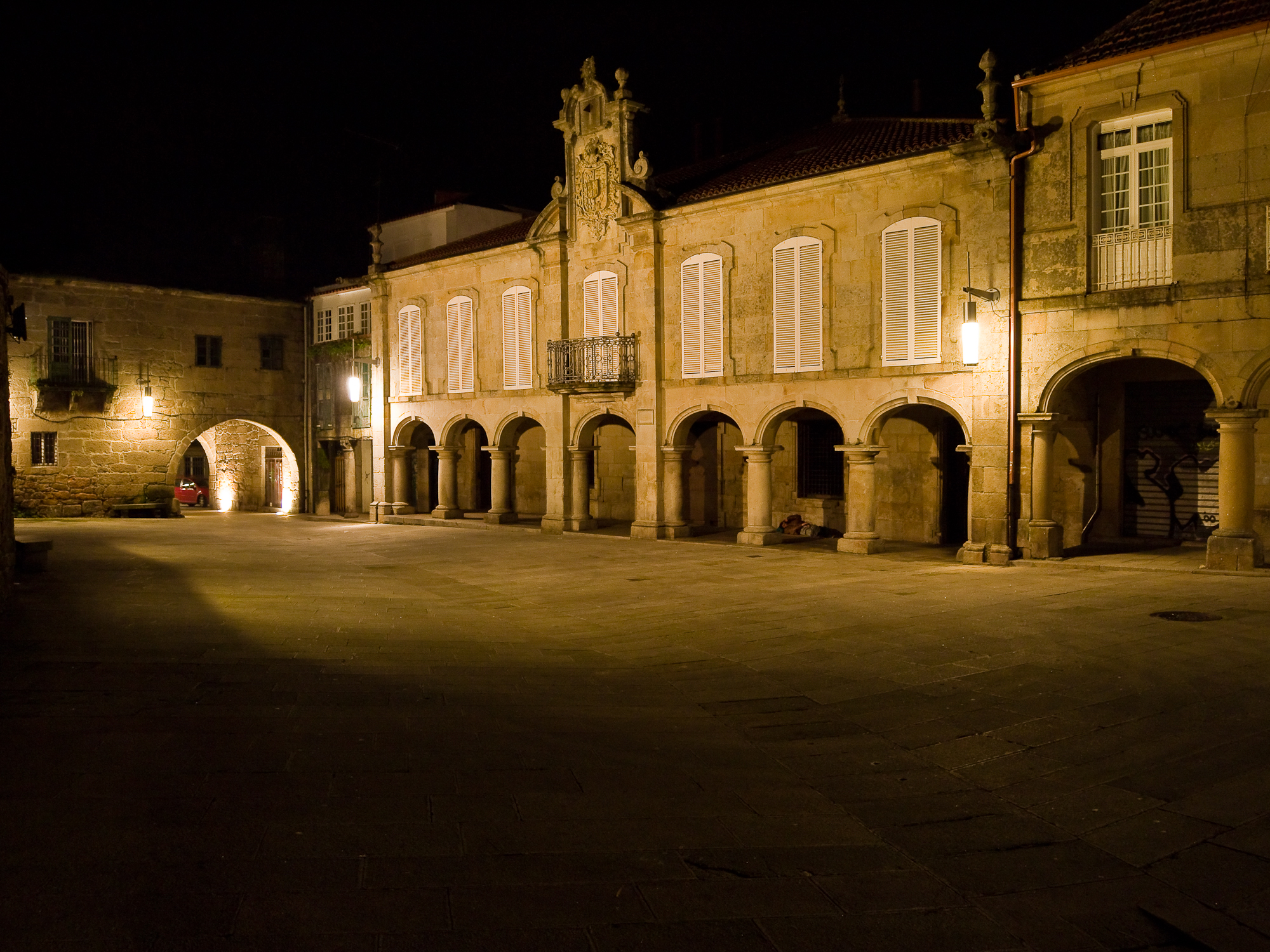
Mugartegui Baroque Palace

Plaza de Méndez Núñez
In the centre of the old town, there is the 15th-century house with a stone coat of arms (showing the arms of the Lemos, Taboada and Bugarín) of Cru and Montenegro, which crosses Don Gonzalo Street with its pointed arch. In its centre is a bronze statue of Valle-Inclán, the work of the sculptor César Lombera. The sculpture is in this square because it was there that the writer used to meet other intellectuals when he lived in Pontevedra.

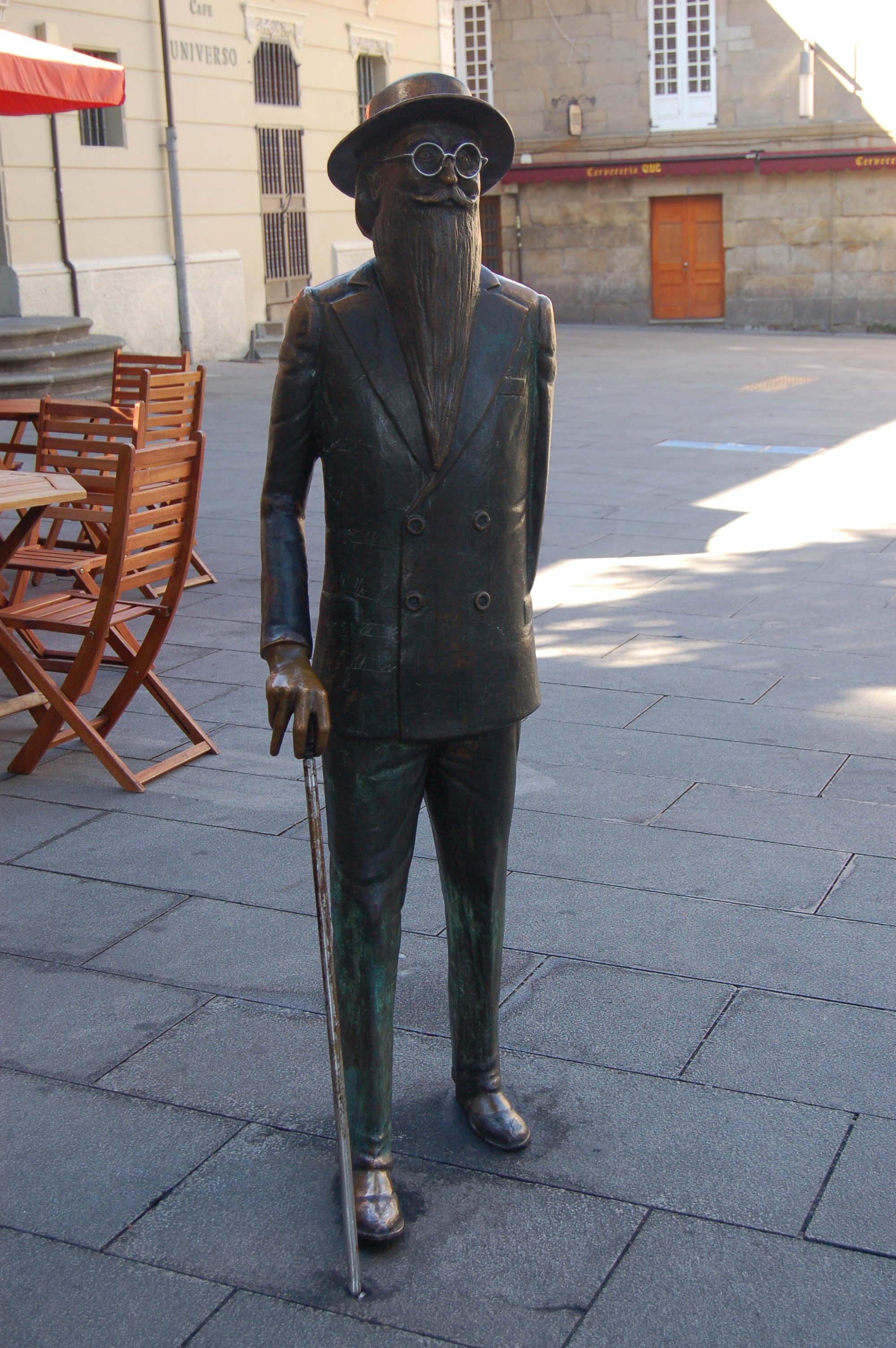
Valle-Inclán on Méndez Núñez square

Plaza de Curros Enríquez
Triangular square where you can admire the French attic of the house on the north side and one of the 19th-century forge fountains.

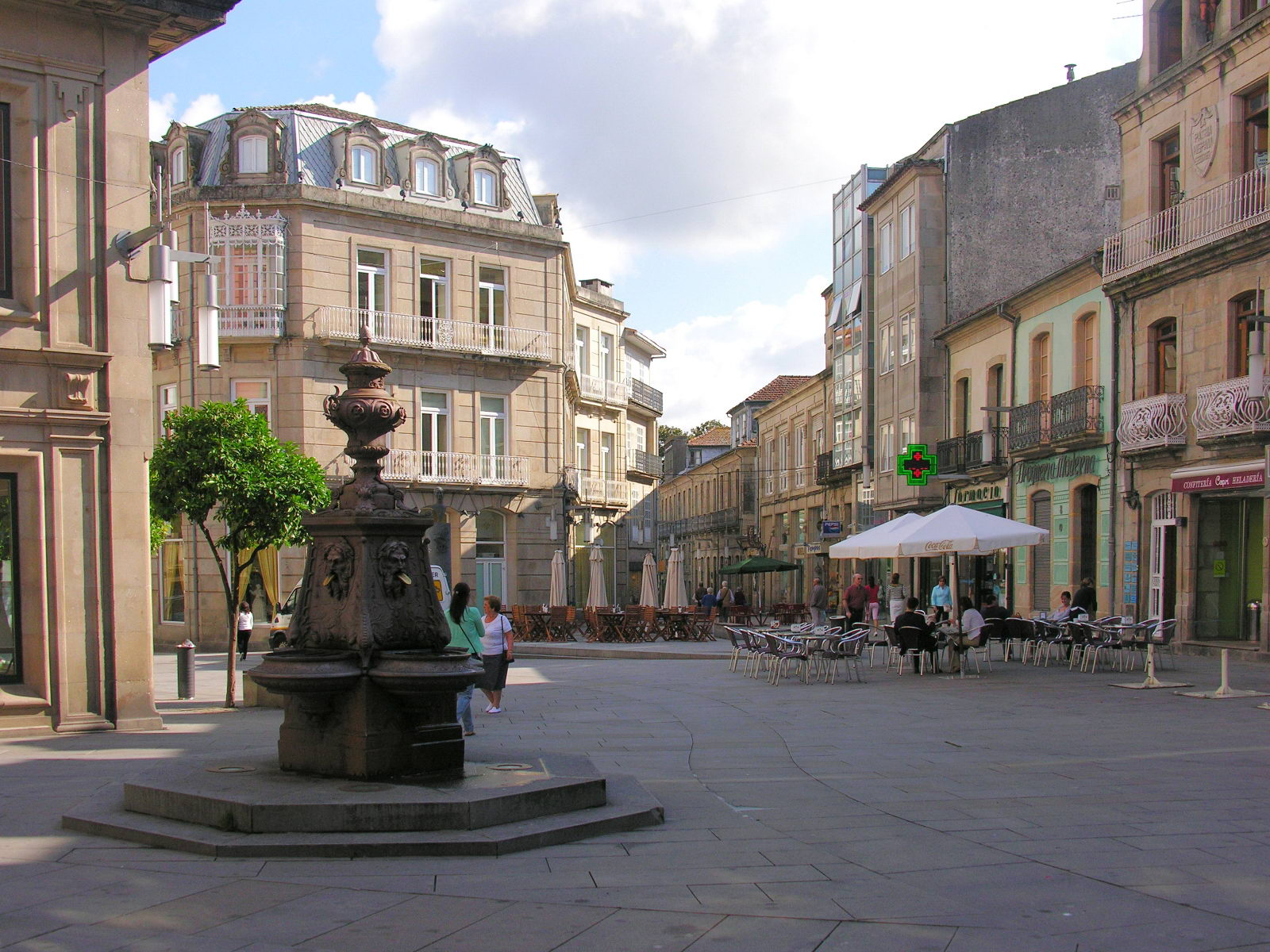
Curros Enríquez Square, old town

Praza do Peirao
The Quay Square is the name given to the docks of the medieval port of Pontevedra. There is a stone fountain in its centre and a 1930s house on the south side which now belongs to the official school of quantity surveyors.

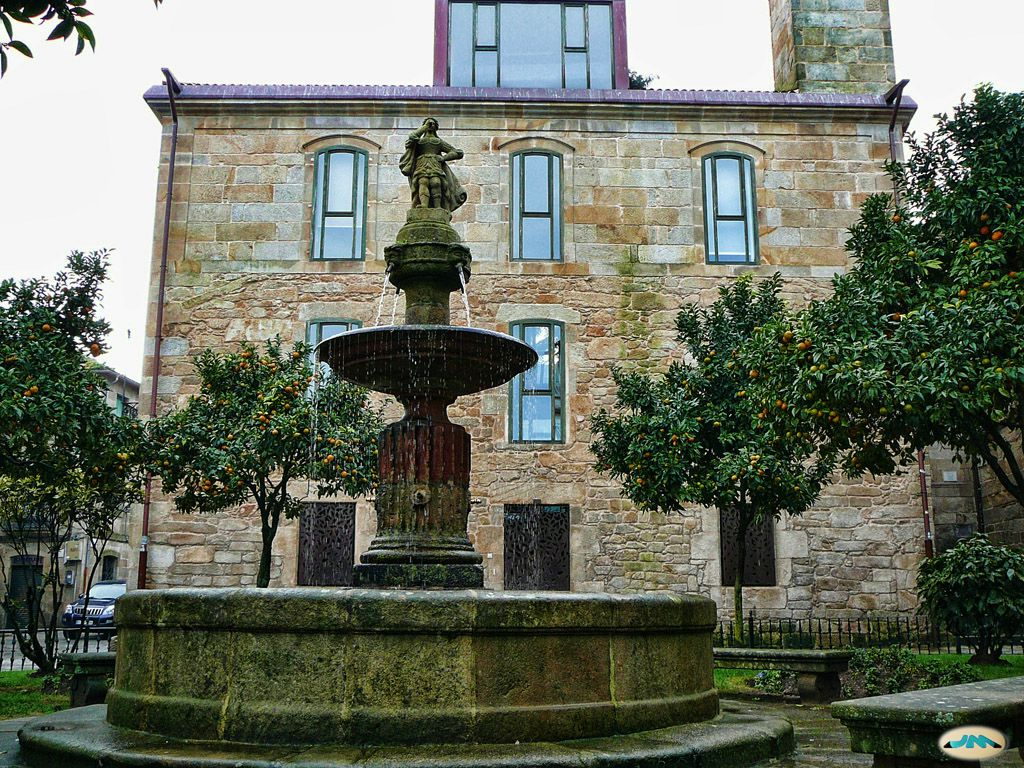
Quay Square.

Praza das Cinco Rúas
It is named after five streets that meet here: two sections of Isabel II Street and Baron, Charino and San Nicolás Street. The square is home to many tapas bars. One of its main landmarks is a stone calvary dating from 1773, featuring an expressive carving of Adam and Eve eating the forbidden fruit. The square is also known for the house in which the writer Valle-Inclán lived.

Plaza Alonso de Fonseca (former Plaza de Santa María)
In the Plaza of Santa Maria there is the Basilica of Santa Maria la Mayor in the background and a stone cross that was originally on the Burgo Bridge, the Mendoza Mansion and a typical 19th-century forge fountain in the city. Underneath the square is the Interpretation Centre of the Archbishopric Towers which, until the 19th century, were located on the site currently occupied by the Mendoza Mansion.

Praza de España
Pontevedra main pedestrian square is the link between the old town and Alameda and the expansion of the official and administrative city of the 19th century (Provincial Council, Government Delegation, Valle-Inclán High School (modernist of the early 20th century) and the City Hall). It has two underground car parks.

Plaza de San José
It is in the square of St. Joseph that stands the monument to the Tertulia, a bronze monument, officially called the Literary Circle in Modern Coffee, recalling that Pontevedra was the cradle of Galician intellectuals in the early twentieth century, it is formed by several intellectuals drinking coffee. At the top of the former Pontevedra Savings Bank building is a large bronze sculpture, 6 metres high, of the Greek hero Teucer statue, the mythical founder of the city.

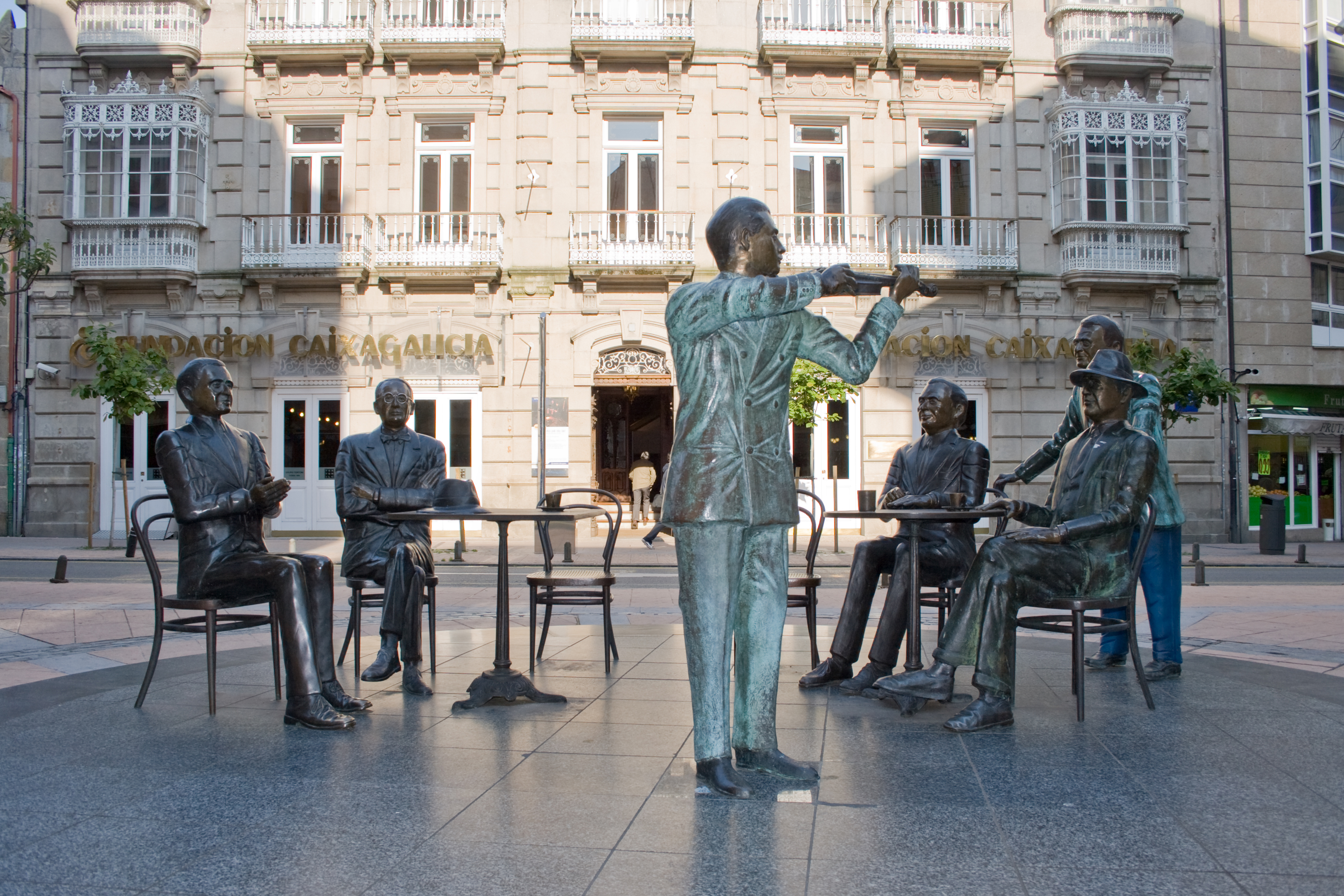
Tertulia Monument

It is also remarkable the former sailors' area of "A Moureira" near Corbaceiras Avenue. Other more modern emblematic squares in the city are the Plaza de Barcelos and the Plaza de Galicia.

=== Parks and green areas ===
Pontevedra is the second largest city in Galicia in terms of green areas per square kilometre per capita.

- Park of the Alameda by the architect Alejandro Sesmero. Surrounded by administrative buildings of the 19th century.

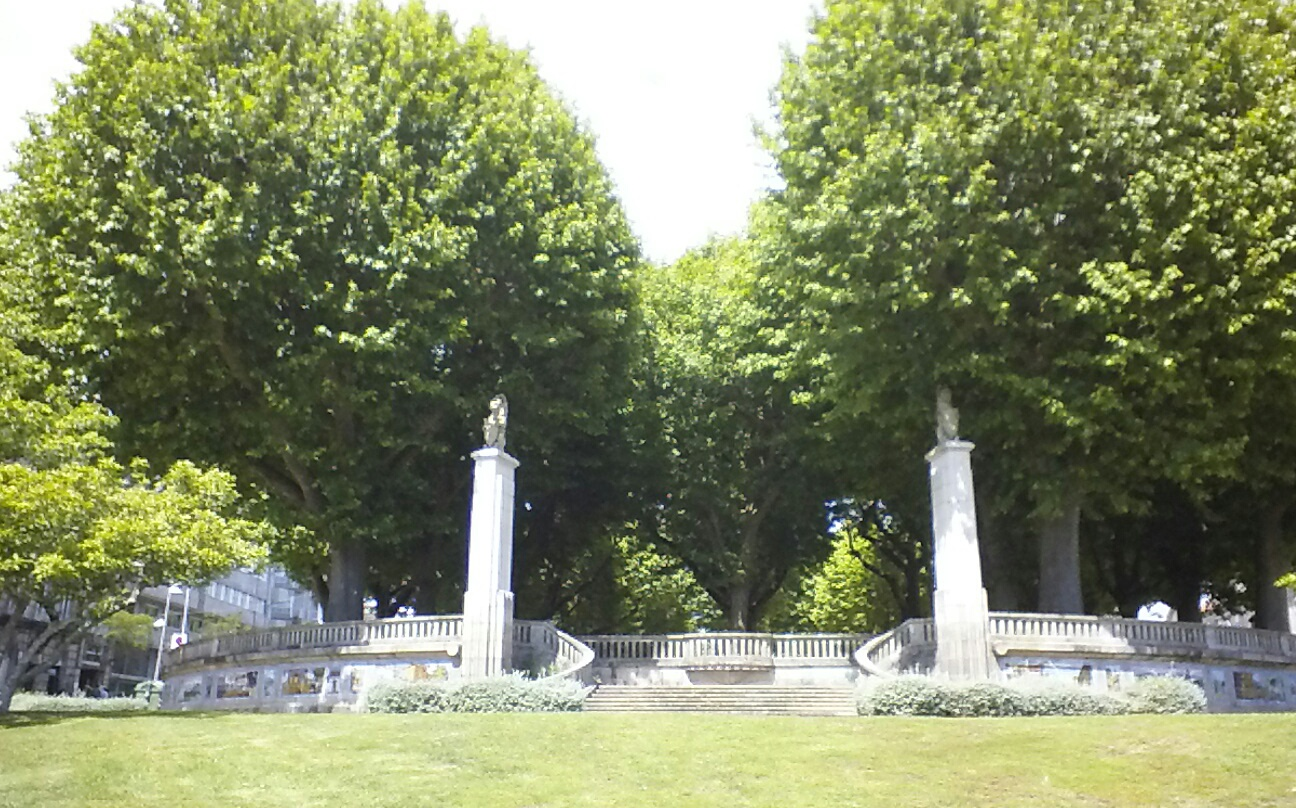
Alameda of the 19th century

- Park of the Palm Trees. In the city centre, the central alley is surrounded by tall palm trees that give it its name.
- Barcelos Park. In the city centre, very close to the main pedestrian and commercial streets.
- Rosalía de Castro Park. Close to the modern cable-stayed bridge, the Strap bridge.
- Park of the Island of Sculptures. On an island at the mouth of the river Lérez. Here are sculptures in granite by famous contemporary Spanish and international artists.

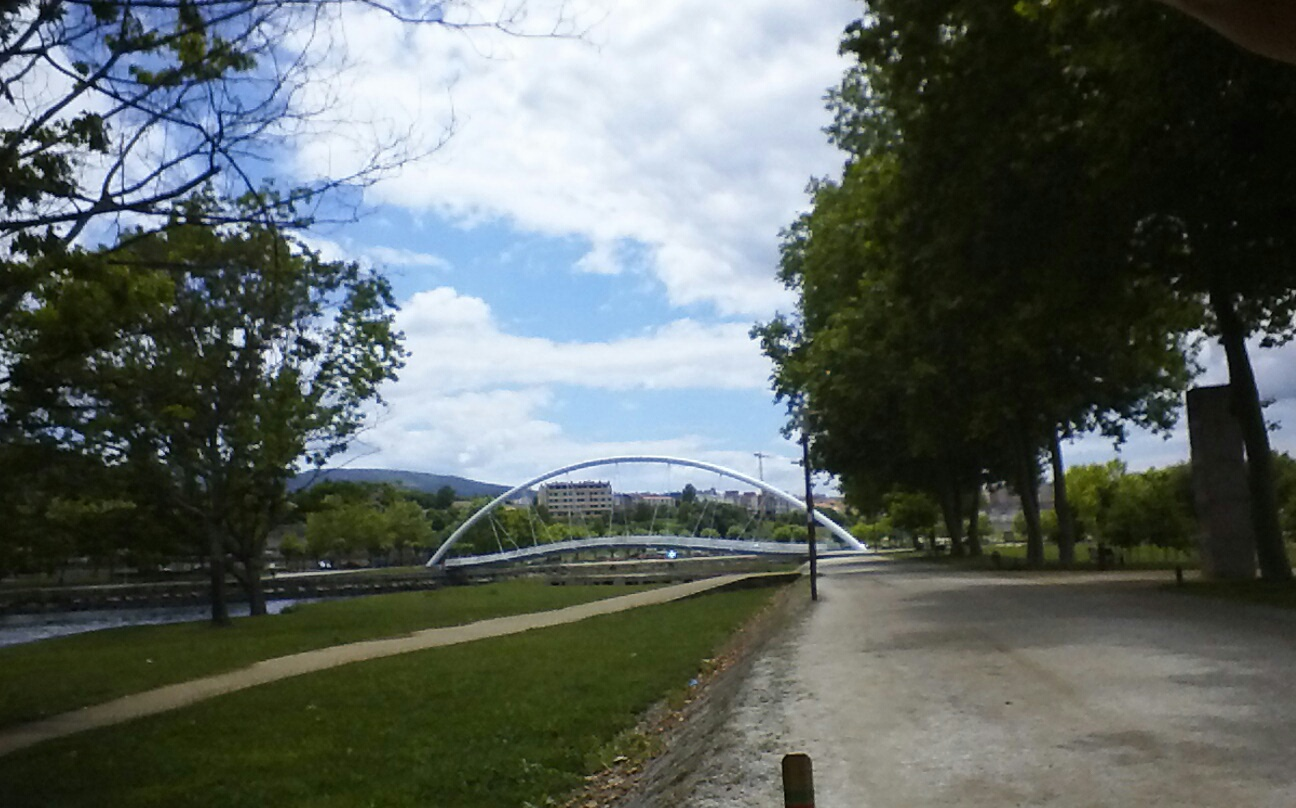
Park of the Island of Sculptures

- Marismas de Alba Natural Park. A large natural park that includes walkways for walking or cycling. The entrance is next to the Corrientes Bowstring Bridge on the north shore.
- Campolongo Park. In the Campolongo district. Here is an old granary on pillars typical of Galicia.
- Gafos River Park. This park borders this small river that runs through part of the city.
- Valdecorvos Park. In the Valdecorvos neighbourhood, park of 6 hectares.
- Seaside promenade – Lérez Banks. All along the Ria de Pontevedra and the River Lérez, with cycle and pedestrian paths. From the lookout point on the promenade the Tambo Island can be seen.
- Belvedere Park. In the Monte Porreiro district, where the UNED Associated Centre of Pontevedra is located (National University of Distance Education).
- Lourizán Park. In the Lourizán area, the most important botanical garden in Galicia, created in 1949.

The municipality also has three beaches: The beach of The Lérez, the beach of Placeres and the beach of Fontaíña.

Parks and walking areas

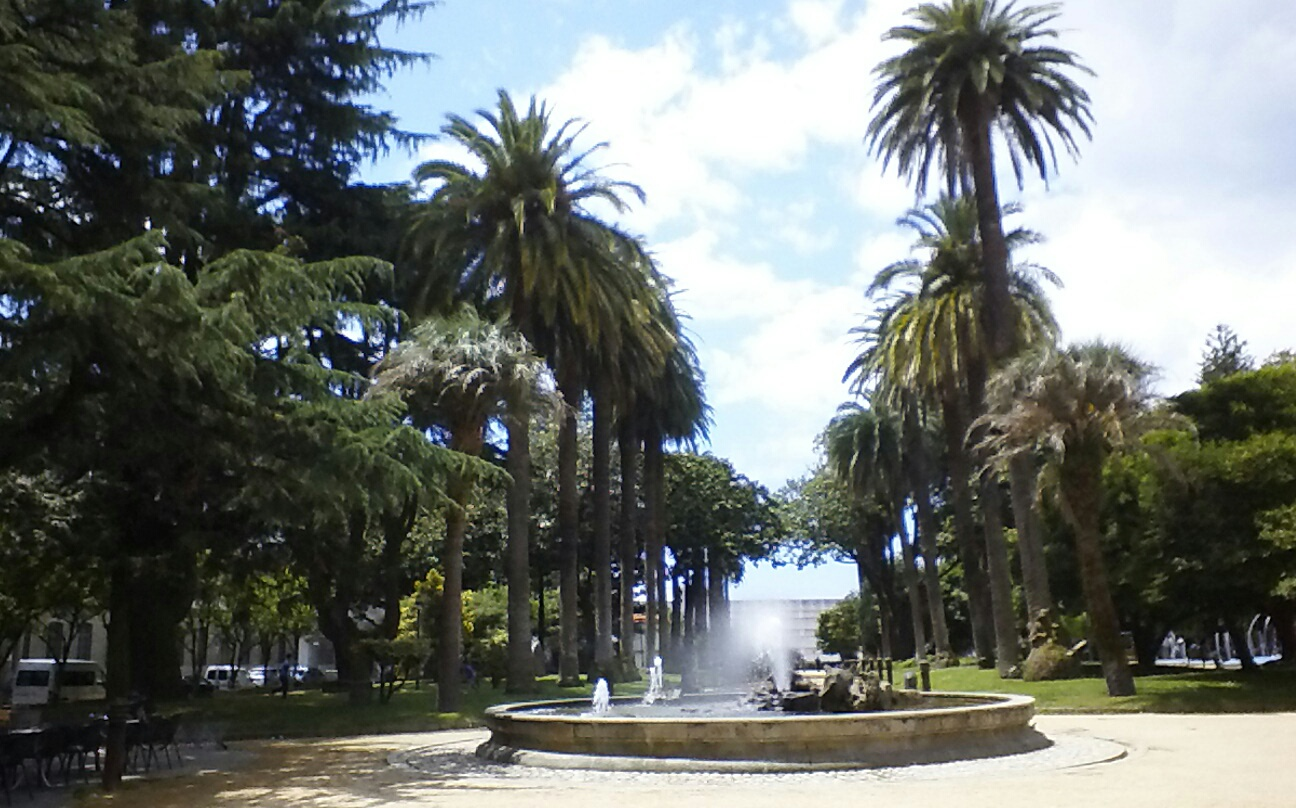
Palm Trees Park

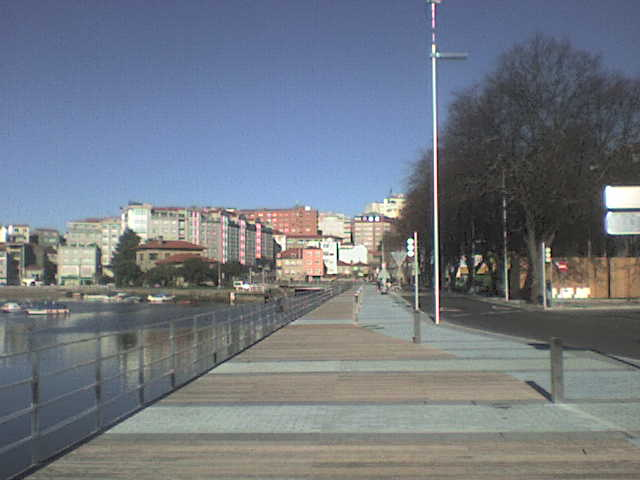
Pontevedra Seaside Promenade

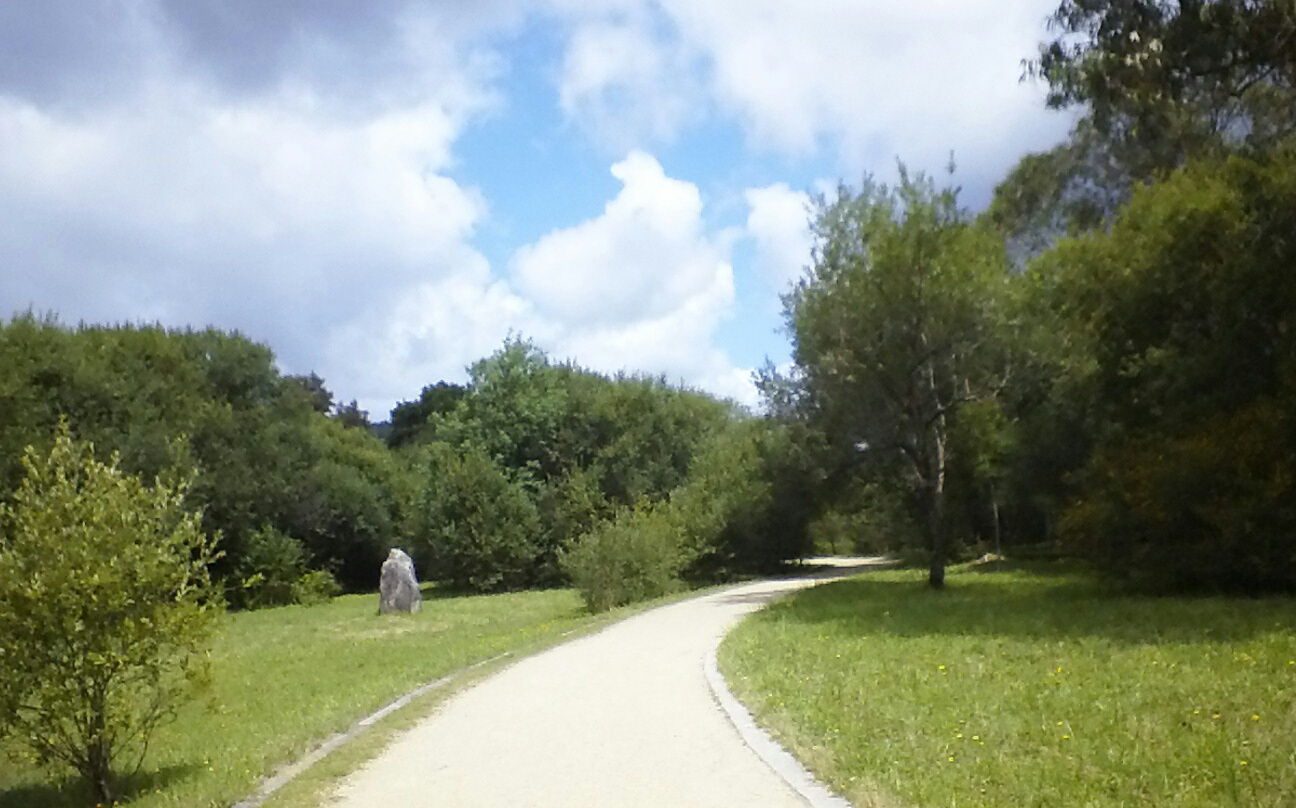
Marismas de Alba Park

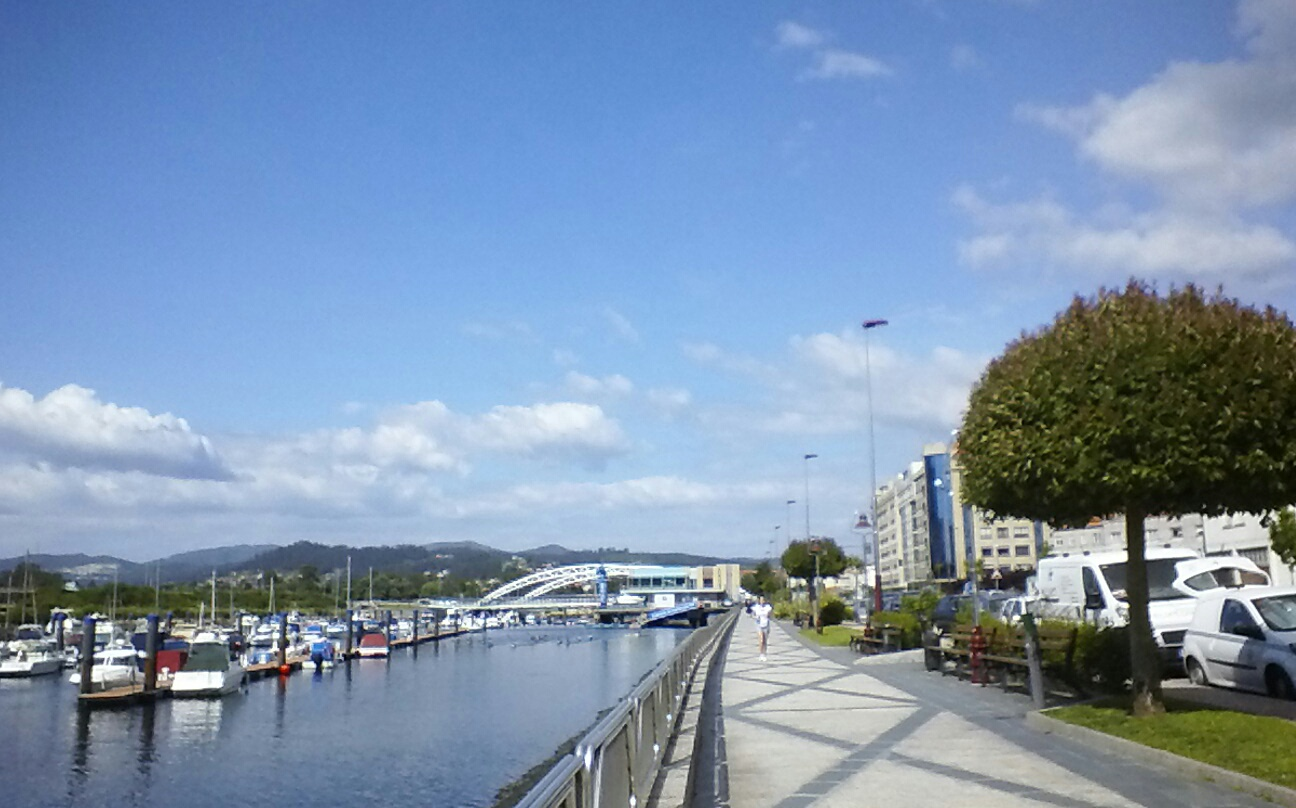
Seafront and Pontevedra marina

=== Beaches ===
The municipality has three beaches: the Lérez Beach, the Placeres Beach and the Fontaíña Beach. The Lérez Beach is opposite the Island of Sculptures park.

In the neighbouring municipalities, a few kilometres away, there are several Blue Flag beaches on both banks of the Ria de Pontevedra. On the southern shore are the beaches of Portocelo, Mogor or Aguete, as well as Lapamán. On the northern shore, Cabeceira is the closest, three kilometres from the city centre, and a little further away are the beaches of Raxó, Areas, Canelas, Montalvo, Pragueira and especially the famous La Lanzada, not far from La Toja Island and its luxury hotels and casino.

The Castiñeiras Lake is located 9 kilometres from the city. Around it there are large recreational areas with picnic areas, barbecues, fountains and children's playgrounds.

== Administration and politics ==
Pontevedra is a provincial and comarcal (shire/county, with no administrative role) capital, as well as seat of the district court. The city hosts the headquarters of the provincial government as well as offices of the Galician government, in addition to offices representing the Spanish government. The city provides a wide range of administrative services with an effect reaching far beyond its municipal limits. This makes Pontevedra a focal point for intense political struggles.

=== Governance ===
Since the restoration of democracy in 1977 after the dictatorship, Pontevedra's local government had traditionally been controlled by the conservative People's Party of Galicia (Partido Popular de Galicia, PPdeG-PP). However, after the 1999 elections the office of mayor was won by Miguel Anxo Fernández Lores, representing the Galician Nationalist Bloc (Bloque Nacionalista Galego, BNG), in coalition with the Socialists' Party of Galicia (Partido Socialista de Galicia, PSdeG-PSOE), until today. The local corporation is divided into a number of departments, or concellarias, each one dealing with a specific issue such as Planning, Environment, Revenue, Mobility and Transportation, Sports, Public Works, or Tourism.

=== Capital city ===
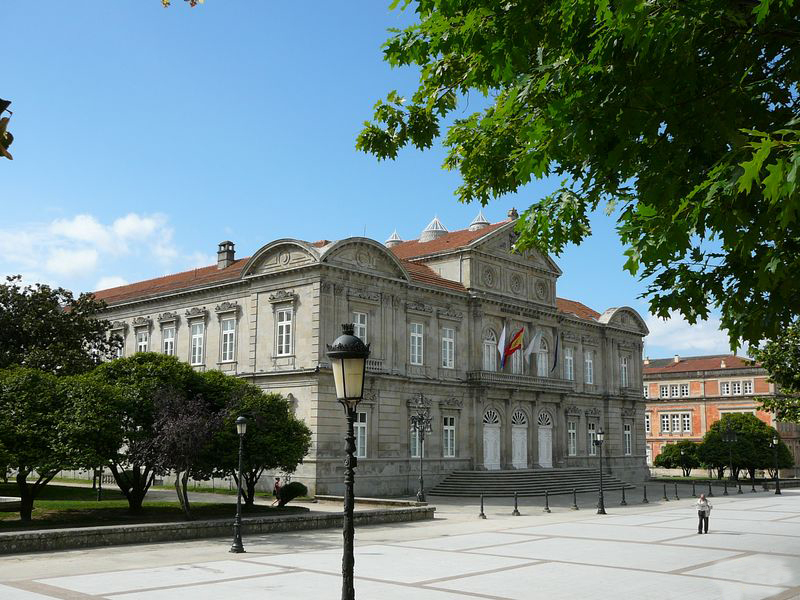
19th-century palace of the Provincial Council of Pontevedra in Gran Vía de Montero Ríos.

The city is the capital of the province of Pontevedra, and is therefore home to the provincial, autonomous and Central Government administrative bodies.

In the provincial aspect, the Provincial Deputation of Pontevedra stands out, which offers the municipalities of the province different services (fire extinction, sports,...) and is in charge of its government and administration.

On an autonomous level, the city has the Xunta de Galicia which, since the last reform of the Autonomous Administration, brings together the representation of all the areas of the Autonomous Government in Pontevedra. Since 2008, the Provincial Offices of the Xunta de Galicia offer their services in a large central building presided over by two twin towers built in the Administrative City in María Victoria Moreno Avenue 43, which agglutinates most of the provincial delegations, except some such as that of Environment, Territory and Infrastructures, located in another building very close to the Xunta de Galicia in Alcalde Hevia street.

Representing the Central Government is the Subdelegation of the Government, the former Civil Government, functionally dependent on the Delegate of the Government in Galicia, located in the Plaza de España, as well as the location in the city of the peripheral services of the State (provincial departments of the different ministries such as the Defence Department, provincial service of Shorelines, Provincial Service of Agriculture and Fishing, Provincial Service of Telecommunications (the latter located in the old building of the Bank of Spain).

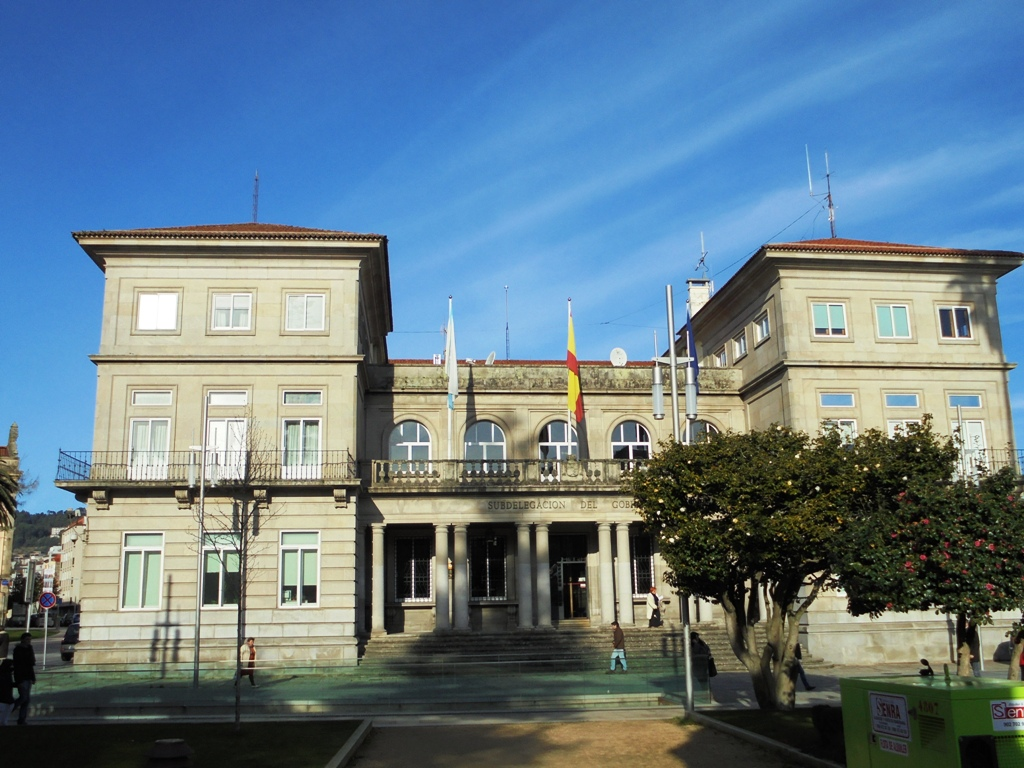
Subdelegation of the Government in Pontevedra capital city

Pontevedra is also the capital provincial judicial district. It houses the headquarters of the Provincial Court of Pontevedra, where sections 1, 2, 3 and 4 of this collegiate body are to be found in the Palace of Justice. It also houses other provincial bodies dependent on the Ministry of the Interior such as the Provincial Traffic Headquarters, the Provincial Police Department, the Provincial Headquarters of the Civil Guard as the capital of the province.

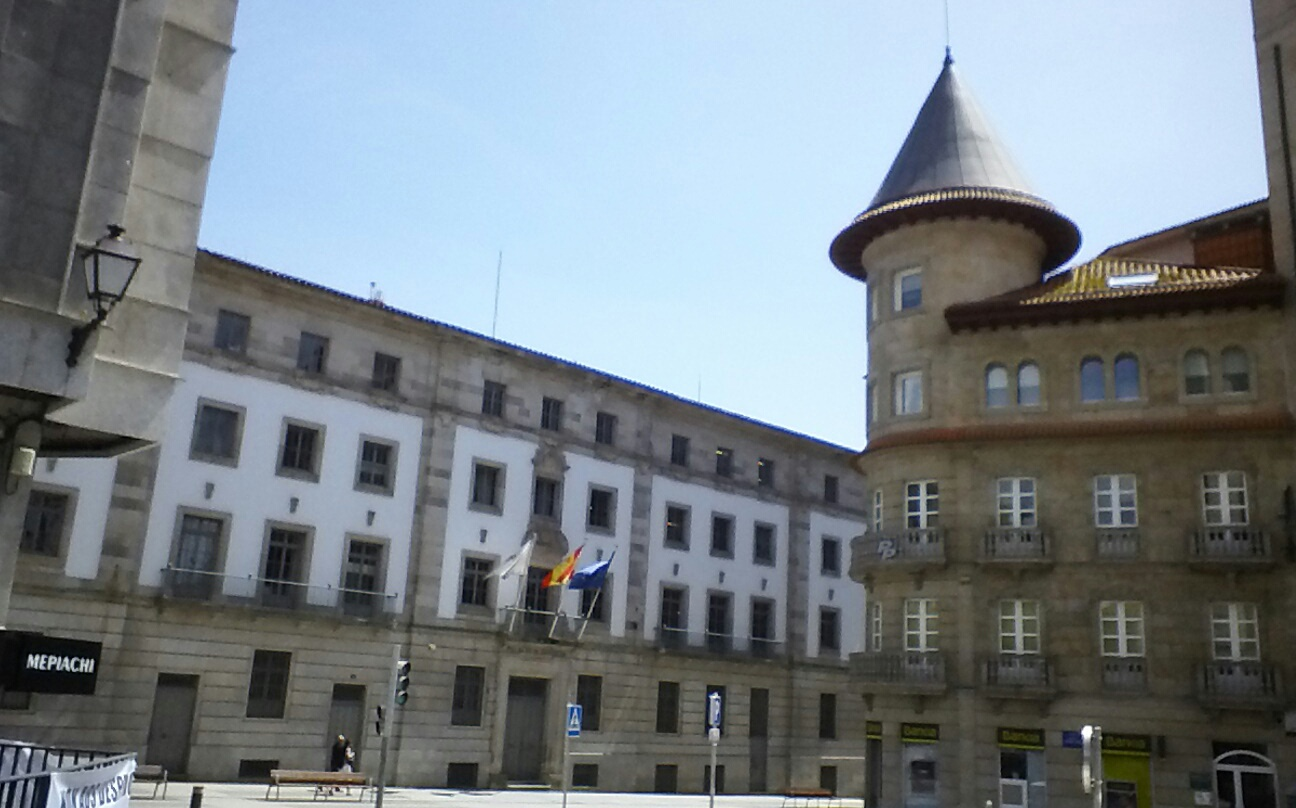
Palace of Justice and seat of the Provincial Court in the Province of Pontevedra

== Economy ==
Pontevedra has traditionally been a trading city. In the Middle Ages, guilds thrived in the old town, giving name to streets and squares still preserved today. During the 16thC Pontevedra was the main Galician port, providing for a very intense fishing and sea-trading activity.

In the 1833 territorial division of Spain Galicia was sub-divided into four provinces, and Pontevedra became capital of its own province. The city then became an administrative and commercial centre, in contrast with Vigo, which attracted the industrial activity, after Franco's dictatorship gave this city a free-trade zone and a Development Pole in 1947. In fact, the first modern industries to appear in Pontevedra would only do so in the 1960s.

Currently, the tertiary sector employs 65 per cent of the population, while industry employs 17 per cent. Industrial activity is reduced to a handful of companies, namely pulp mills (where the municipal authority is seeking the closure of the ENCE biofactory) and construction. The tertiary sector is not especially dynamic, although a number of policies have been implemented to improve the situation. Tourism is increasing, with visitors coming mostly from Spain and Portugal. The total unemployment rate is 7% (June 2021), according to data from the Xunta de Galicia (Galician Government). Pontevedra was the seat of the Caixa de Pontevedra credit union, eventually merged into other entities up to the current Abanca.

=== Service sector ===
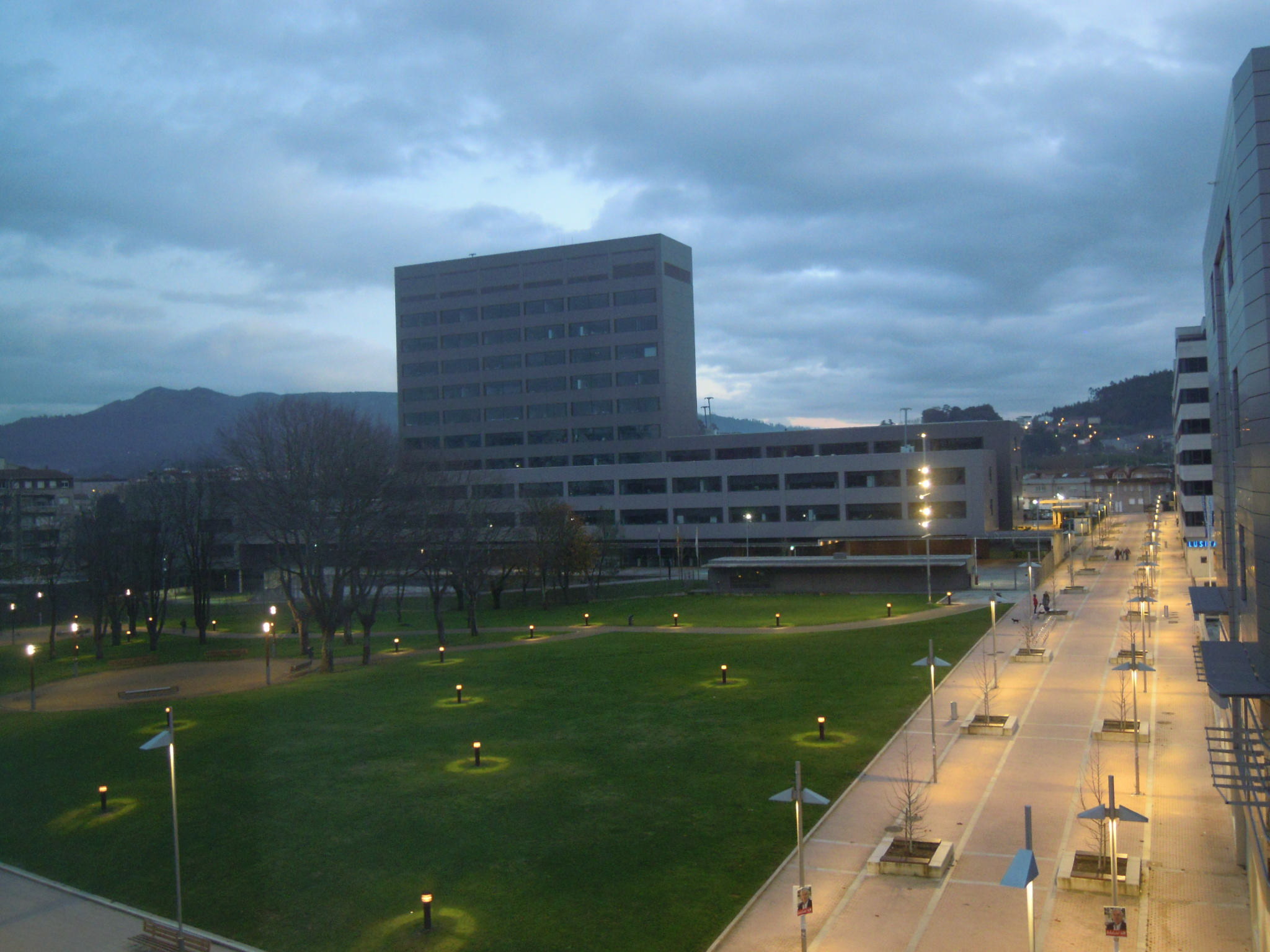
Administrative Complex of Pontevedra.

The majority of Pontevedra's citizens work in the service sector, which is evident when one considers that the city is the head of an area of influence of some 210,000 inhabitants, which means the existence of an important and diversified commercial sector. To this must be added its privileged location in the centre of the Rias Baixas, which makes it a tourist city and gives an important specific weight to the hotel industry in the economy. The city ranks among the Spanish cities with the highest annual income.

==== Public employment ====
As the capital of the province, Pontevedra has numerous offices, provincial offices and facilities of the different Public Administrations, in which a large number of civil servants work.

==== Institutions ====
As the capital of the province of Pontevedra and the centre of the Rias Baixas, Pontevedra is the seat of numerous institutions and bodies that have their headquarters in the city. In addition to the Provincial Departments of state, autonomic and provincial organisms, many institutions are located in the city, like: the Provincial Headquarters of Traffic, the Regulatory Board denomination of origin "Rias Baixas" (Albariño wine), the State Public Library, the Provincial Historical Archive of Pontevedra, the Provincial Headquarters of Post and Telegraphs, the Postal Treatment Centre of Pontevedra, the Provincial Office of the Spanish Red Cross, the Provincial Department of the National Institute of Statistics and the Electoral Census Office, the Illustrious Official College of Doctors of Pontevedra, the Official College of Dentists and Stomatologists of Pontevedra and Orense, the Illustrious Provincial College of Lawyers of Pontevedra, the State Highways Unit in Pontevedra, the Galician Centre of Sports Technology for elite and high level sportsmen/woman, the Galicia Biological Mission, the Forest and Environmental Research Centre of Galicia and so on.

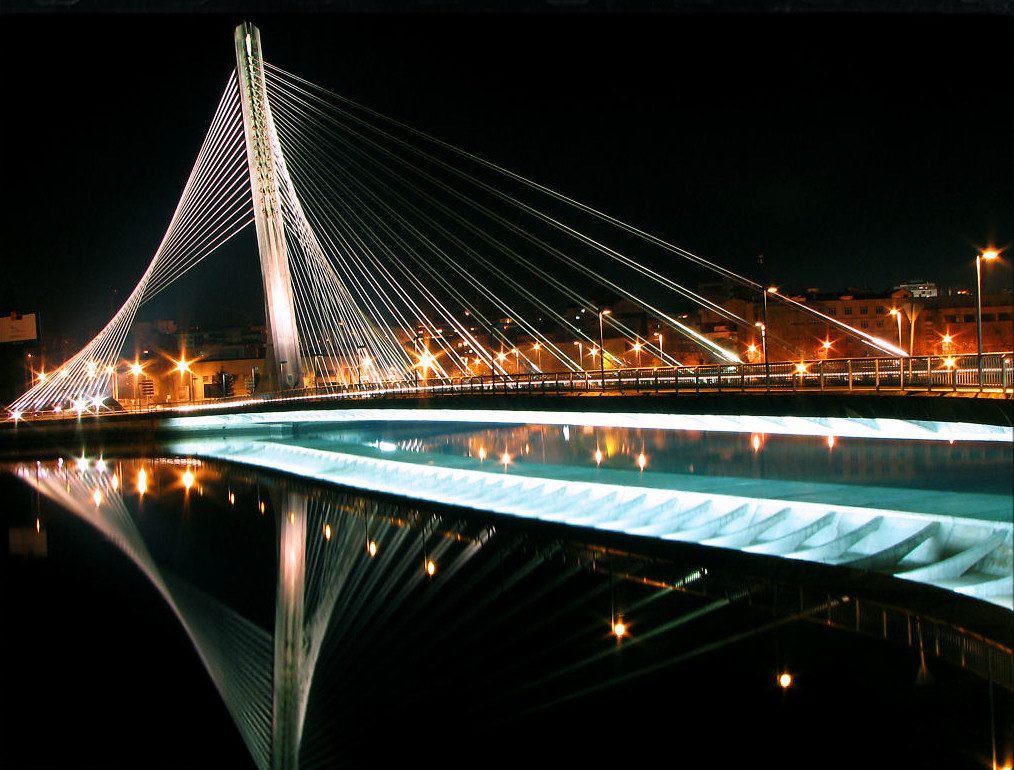
Tirantes Bridge, modern cable-stayed bridge over Lérez River

==== Tourism ====
The city is the capital of the tourist region of the Rias Baixas. It is currently a reference urban destination in Europe for trips to cities that are eminently pedestrian and without cars, and that stand out for their quality of life, at the level of Dubrovnik, Copenhagen or Capri. In addition, tourism has increased in the 21st century, positioning the city as a pole of attraction in Galicia and north of Portugal, being currently one of the preferred urban destinations next to A Coruña or Santiago de Compostela.

Likewise, the city is a pole of attraction for international tourists thanks to its old town, its urban model, the Ria de Pontevedra, the Lérez River and its bridges. Pontevedra city is a tourist enclave of relevance in Galicia, and at national level, having become in 2024 the most desired city to travel to in Spain according to data from the travel booking web portal Booking.com.

==== Fairs and congresses ====
Pontevedra is also the headquarters of the organization of trade fairs and congresses and especially of national and international sports events that also create an economic engine because of the number of visitors they attract to the city. It also hosts conferences of special relevance in Galicia such as Culturgal, the fair of the cultural industries of Galicia.

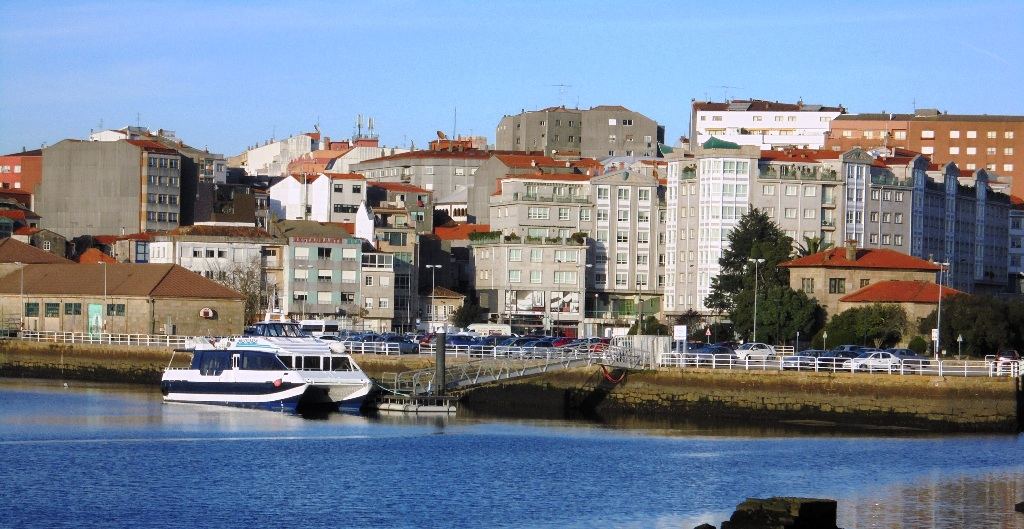
Corbaceiras port in A Moureira.

==== Trade ====
The city is the centre of attraction in the central and northern part of the province of Pontevedra. There are many traditional shops, national and international franchises in the city centre and shopping centres such as Carrefour Planet, La Barca and Vialia on the outskirts. The city is also home to e-commerce companies such as the company specializing in the sale of books and publishing products imosver.com.

==== Publishing activity ====
The city is home to one of the most important publishing houses in Galicia, Kalandraka. Others also focus their activity in the metropolitan area of Pontevedra, such as Cumio Publishing and the headquarters of the important chain of Nobel Bookstores.

=== Industry ===
In the municipality of Pontevedra and its metropolitan area of Pontevedra there are several industrial estates, as well as other companies located in other parts of the municipality.

==== Industrial areas ====
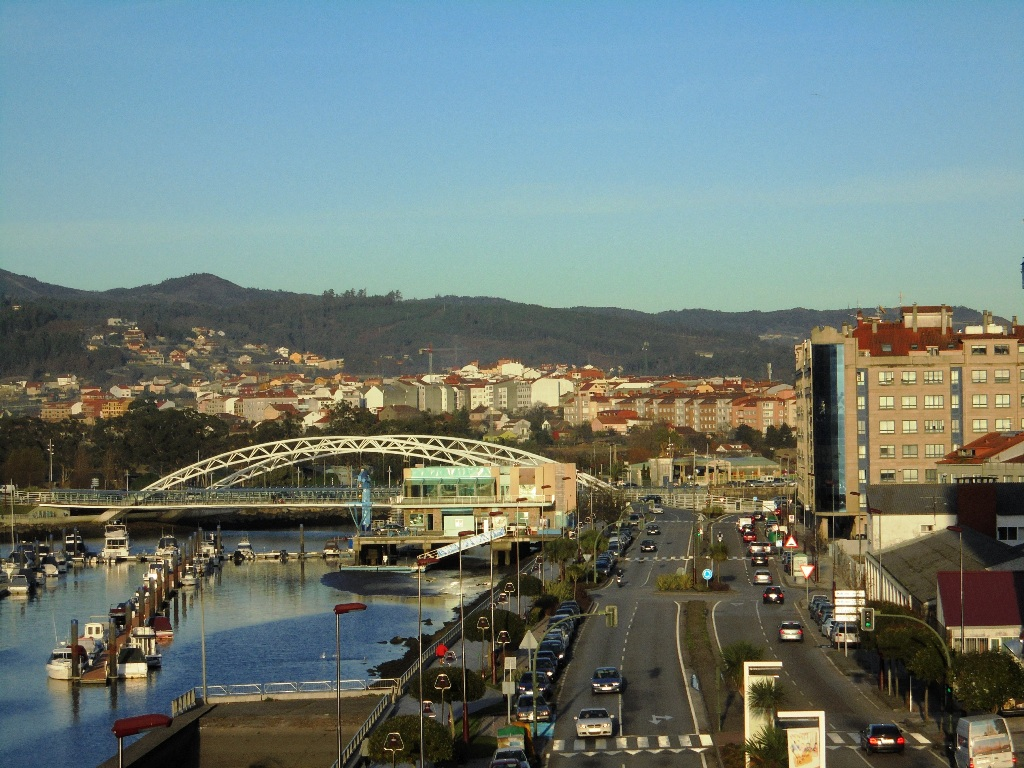
Beiramar Avenue, marina and modern bridge of As Correntes.

On the outskirts of the city and bordering the neighbouring municipality of Ponte Caldelas is O Campiño industrial estate, which houses important industries such as automobile auxiliaries among others, but which has remained insufficient in terms of space in the face of the demand for land by companies. There is also, although it is smaller, the "A Granxa do Bao" industrial estate, although this is more aimed at commercial than industrial purposes, with mechanical workshops, gymnasiums, a large area dedicated to do-it-yourself, etc. In the industrial estate O Campiño there are important companies in the automobile sector such as Aludec, which has 6 production centres (Galvanic 1 and 2, Components, Stamping and Injection 1 and 2).

The exhaustion of the soil of industrial estate O Campiño and the lack of development of more industrial land in the municipality of Pontevedra has led to the development of estates in areas of metropolitan area of Pontevedra such as Ponte Caldelas, Barro-Meis, Poio or Marín. The A Reigosa industrial estate, in the municipality of Ponte Caldelas, is particularly noteworthy for its development in recent years.

==== Other industries and companies ====
A very important point of settlement of several companies within metropolitan area of Pontevedra is the area of Port of Marín and Ria de Pontevedra.

Within the municipality of Pontevedra there are also other important companies among which the distribution company Froiz stands out. (supermarkets, hypermarkets). Other renowned ones are, among others, Setga. exterior lighting company design, signage and street furniture, chosen to illuminate the center of Amsterdam, Hifas da Terra, innovation and ecology company focused primarily on mycology, Krack (a shoemaking company) or EDF dedicated to photovoltaic energy.

The city is also the center of construction companies such as San José or Balboa and Buceta.

== Health ==
Pontevedra is well provided with quality private (like Quirón Hospital) and public clinics and health centres, where the Montecelo Hospital stands out as the largest health centre in the comarca and one of the largest in the province. This hospital is renowned for its oncology department. Public health is regulated by the Galician Health Service (Servizo Galego de Saúde). The University Hospital Complex of Pontevedra (CHOP) includes the Pontevedra Provincial Hospital founded in 1897 and located in the centre of the city and the Montecelo Hospital created in 1973 and located in the parish of Mourente; apart from other centres. There are also private hospitals of Quirónsalud such as the Quirónsalud Miguel Domínguez Hospital, founded as Hospital Domínguez in 1947, in Fray Juan de Navarrete street or the Institute of Neuro-Rehabilitation Quirónsalud Pontevedra. There are also health centres of Quirón Salud, Adeslas and Vithas in Pontevedra: the Quirónsalud Pontevedra Medical Centre, the Quirónsalud Pontevedra Rehabilitation Centre, the Adeslas Pontevedra Medical Centre and the Vithas Rehabilitation Centre.

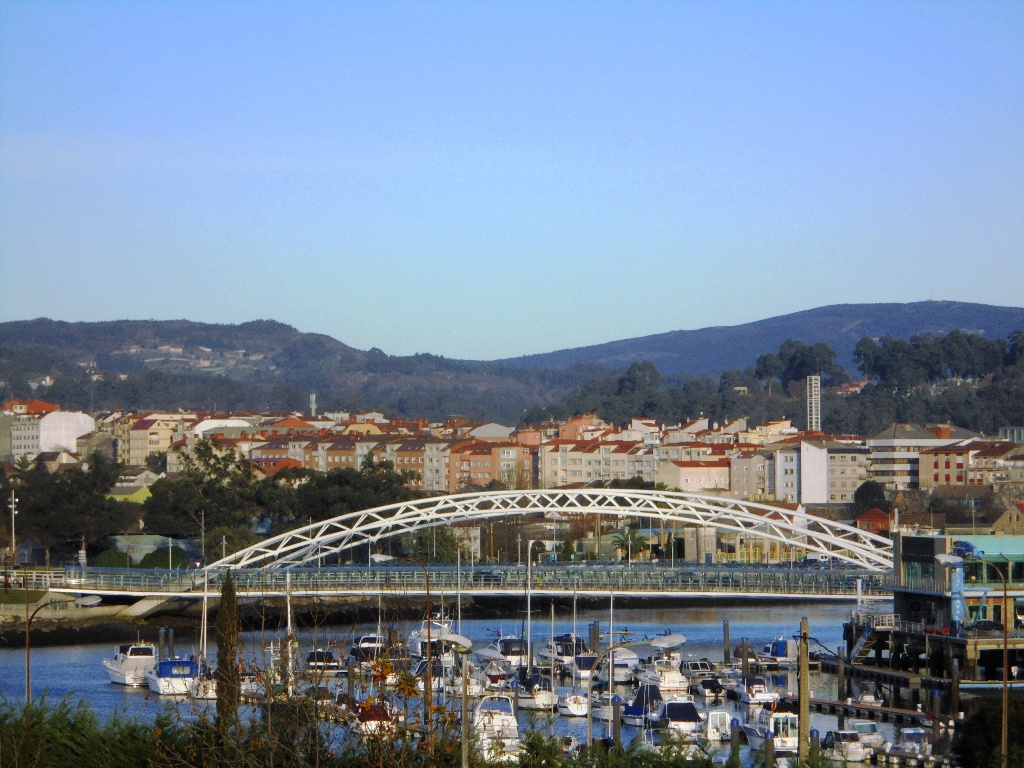
Currents Bridge and marina

The Health Department of the Xunta de Galicia projected for Pontevedra and the sanitary area of the north of its province the Monte Carrasco Hospital located to the south of the city in the parish of Tomeza., project that was subsequently replaced by political disagreements with the city council of the capital by the extension of a new hospital in Montecelo, taking as name this project the Gran Montecelo. This hospital will extend the assistance offer of the capital of the province and the northern area of the province with six new specialties: Radiotherapy, Nuclear Medicine, Hemodynamics complementary to Cardiology, Maxillofacial surgery, Neonatal ICU and Pediatric ICU, both integrated in the Maternal and Infant area. It will have a capacity of 724 beds.

== Education ==
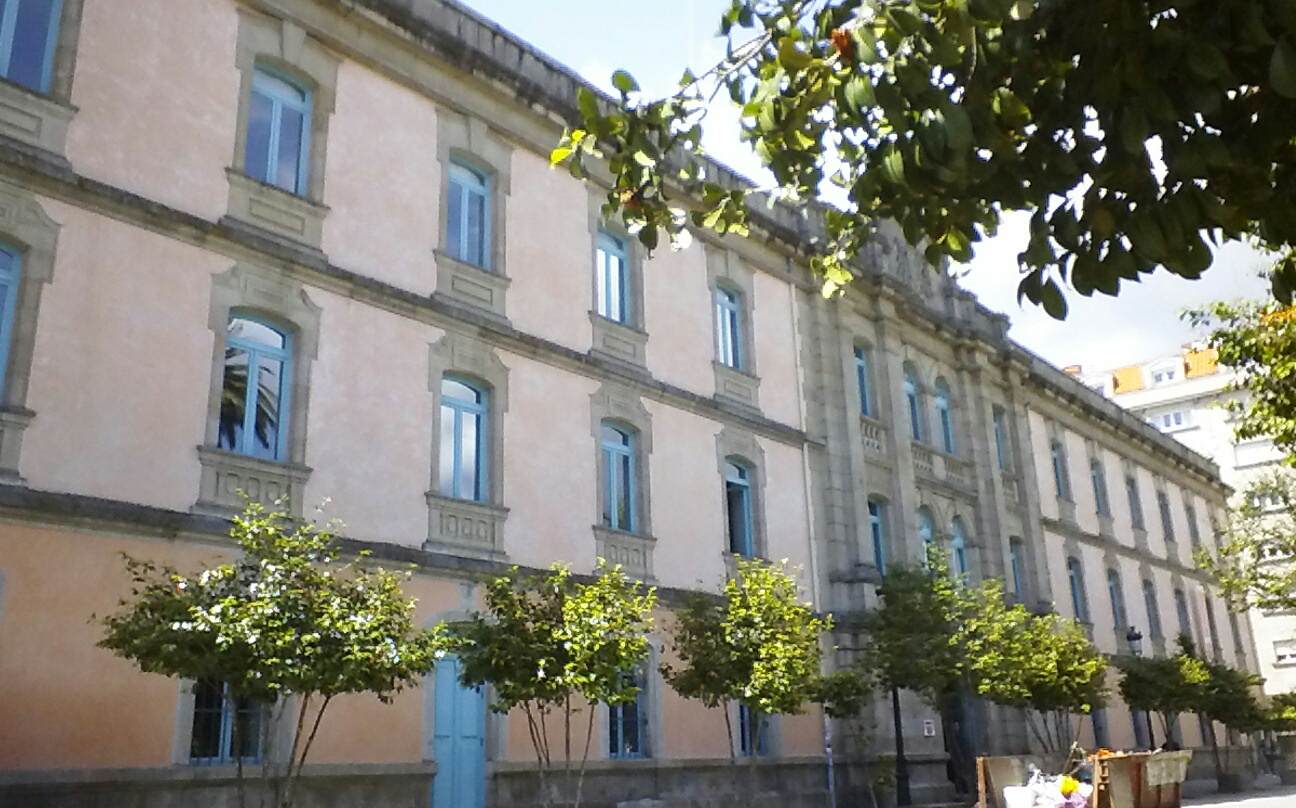
Faculty of Fine Arts.

The city houses a number of university departments in the Pontevedra Campus, which belongs to the Galician University System and acts as a branch of the University of Vigo, which have campuses in the cities of Pontevedra, Ourense and Vigo. Namely these are: Advertising and Public relations, Fine arts, Nursing, Physiotherapy, Forest Engineering, Fashion, Education Sciences and Sport sciences, Governance and Public Management, Design, and Media and Communication Sciences (Audiovisual Communication). Many come to Pontevedra to complete their studies in Fine arts, Advertising and Public Relations, Public Management and Design as this is the only location in Galicia where this disciplines can be studied at university level. In addition, Pontevedra has the Higher School of Conservation and Restoration of Cultural Heritage of Galicia, located in the San Fernando building in the centre of the city, as well as the Faculty of Fine Arts. The city also has the only school of Comic and Illustration in Galicia (private), called O garaxe hermético (the airtight garage), founded by the illustrator Kiko da Silva.

Pontevedra also hosts since 1973 a branch of the Spanish national distance university, the UNED university, the UNED Associated Centre of Pontevedra, where students can pursue numerous university studies. The city has its own Official School of Languages since 1988, regulated by the Galician Department of Education where students can study English, French, German, Italian, Portuguese and Galician.

== Culture ==
=== Museums ===
The city is home to the Pontevedra Museum. It consists of six buildings:

- The Pazo de Castro Monteagudo.
- The Pazo de García Flórez.
- The Fernández López House.
- The former Baroque College of the Society of Jesus, (now called Sarmiento).
- The ruins of the San Domingo Convent (Archaeology Museum).
- The Castelao Building, a large five-storey modern architectural building inaugurated in 2013.

In addition, in 2010 the authorities inaugurated the Archiepiscopal Towers Interpretation Centre (CITA): an underground museum, underneath the Avenida Santa Maria, where the remains of the ancient Archiepiscopal Towers can be seen.

=== Theatres and concert halls ===
Cultural infrastructure in Pontevedra is mainly represented by two venues: The Teatro Principal, in the old town, with a capacity of 434 seated spectators; and the Auditorium-Congress Hall, a modern complex composed by an auditorium with capacity for 772 seated people, a large congress hall, and a number of meeting rooms and smaller halls.

It also has the Afundación auditorium near the Campolongo district with more than 800 seats and concert halls such as the Karma Hall or alternative music and culture halls like the Liceo Mutante.

=== Libraries and research centres ===
The city is home to the Pontevedra State Public Library and other libraries such as the Pontevedra Museum Library, which is mainly dedicated to researchers, and university libraries such as the Central Library of the Pontevedra Campus and the UNED Library.

=== Other cultural activities and venues ===
In addition, every year the City Council organises a series of free, open and public activities, such as a Jazz festival, open air cinema sessions, a medieval fair reenactment, the Feira Franca and other festivities that normally take place in the streets and public squares of the old town.

The Pontevedra Conservatory was established in 1863 and is celebrating its sesquicentenary in 2013. It has been renamed the Conservatorio Profesional de Música Manuel Quiroga, in honour of one of the city's most famous sons, the violinist, composer and artist Manuel Quiroga (1892–1961).

=== Media and entertainment ===
Pontevedra has two daily newspapers: the Diario de Pontevedra, the oldest newspaper in the city still in circulation, and Pontevedra Viva, a daily online newspaper. The city also has a specific edition of the main Galician newspaper, La Voz de Galicia.

RTVE, the Spanish Public Radio and television, and CRTVG, the Galician Public Radio and television, broadcast local editions in their news programmes. Between 1994 and 2012, Pontevedra had a local TV station, Localia Pontevedra.

Most of the national radio stations broadcast their programmes in the Pontevedra area, including Radio Nacional de España, Cadena SER, Cadena COPE, Onda Cero and Punto Radio.

== Sports ==
Pontevedra has a long sporting tradition, with a number of teams competing professionally in different categories. For example:

- Cyclocross. The 2024 UEC European Cyclo-cross Championships were held at Pontevedra. The elite Women's race was won by Fem Van Empel
- Football: Pontevedra CF, playing in the Spanish Primera Federación. The football club plays at the Pasarón stadium
- Handball: BM Cisne, playing in the Spanish Liga ASOBAL (first division). There is also another team which used to be in first division, SD Teucro.
- Indoor football: Leis 26 Pontevedra, playing in the Spanish second division of the Spanish indoor football professional league (LNFS).
- Rugby: Pontevedra has two rugby teams, Mareantes Rugby Clube Pontevedra and Pontevedra Rugby Club. Both teams play in the Galician First Division. In the 2012/13 season, Mareantes RCP won the play-off final to become the league champions.
- Volleyball: C. Durán (amateur).
- Waterpolo: CN Pontevedra, playing in the Galician Waterpolo League.
- Fencing: Club Escola Hungaresa de Esgrima de Pontevedra, founded in 2007, this is the only fencing club in Galicia specialised in sabre. Members of this club compete regularly in the Galician leagues and in the Spanish Sabre Championship.

Pontevedra is the seat of the Centro Galego de Tecnificación Deportiva (High Performance Sporting Centre of Galicia), and it also hosts a number of rowing and canoeing clubs. World and Olympic canoeing champion David Cal used to train in the ria of Pontevedra.

== International relations ==
=== Twin towns – Sister cities ===
Pontevedra is twinned with:

- Barcelos, Portugal
- Merlo, Argentina
- Nafpaktos, Greece
- Salvador da Bahia, Brazil
- San José, Costa Rica
- Santo Domingo, Dominican Republic
- Vila Nova de Cerveira, Portugal

== Notable people ==
- Enrique MacDonell, Vice Admiral Spanish Navy
- Raul Villamarin Rodriguez (living), university vice-president
- Trahamunda, nun in the Middle Ages
- Pedro Mariño de Lobeira (1528–1594), conquistador and chronicler of the Arauco War in the Captaincy General of Chile
- Benito de Soto (1805–1830) Notorious pirate, considered the "Last Pirate of the Atlantic Ocean"
- Manuel Portela Valladares (1867–1952), politician
- Consuelo Acuña Iglesias (1876–1937), Galician resistance fighter
- A.D.R. Castelao (1886–1950), writer, artist and politician, often considered as the most influential figure in Galician contemporary history. Although he was not born in Pontevedra, Castelao expressed a clear wish to be considered an "adoptive son of the city" and to be buried there.
- Elisa Patiño Meléndez (1890–1919) (aka Chichana) was the first women of Galician descent to become a pilot
- Manuel Quiroga (1892–1961), violinist, composer, and artist
- Valentín Paz Andrade (1898–1987), magistrate, politician, and writer
- Alejandro de la Sota (1913–1996), architect
- Pío Cabanillas Gallas (1923–1991), politician
- María Inmaculada Paz-Andrade (1928–2022), physicist
- Fina Casalderrey (1951–), writer
- Alberto Casado Cerviño (1952–), civil servant, vice-president of the European Patent Office
- Mariano Rajoy (1955–), former Prime Minister of Spain
- Francis Lorenzo (1960–), actor
- Manel Loureiro (1975–), writer
- Diego Moldes (1977–), writer
- Pablo Cimadevila Alvarez (1978–), Paralympic Gold Medalist, jeweler, and YouTube content creator
- Celso Míguez (1982–), racing driver
- Francisco Javier Gómez Noya (1983–), triathlete, World Champion
- David Amor (1980–), host and comedian
- Julia Varela (1981–), journalist
- Paula Cheshire (1993–), illustrator and cartoonist
- Teresa Abelleira (2000-), football player for the Spain national team

== Gallery ==
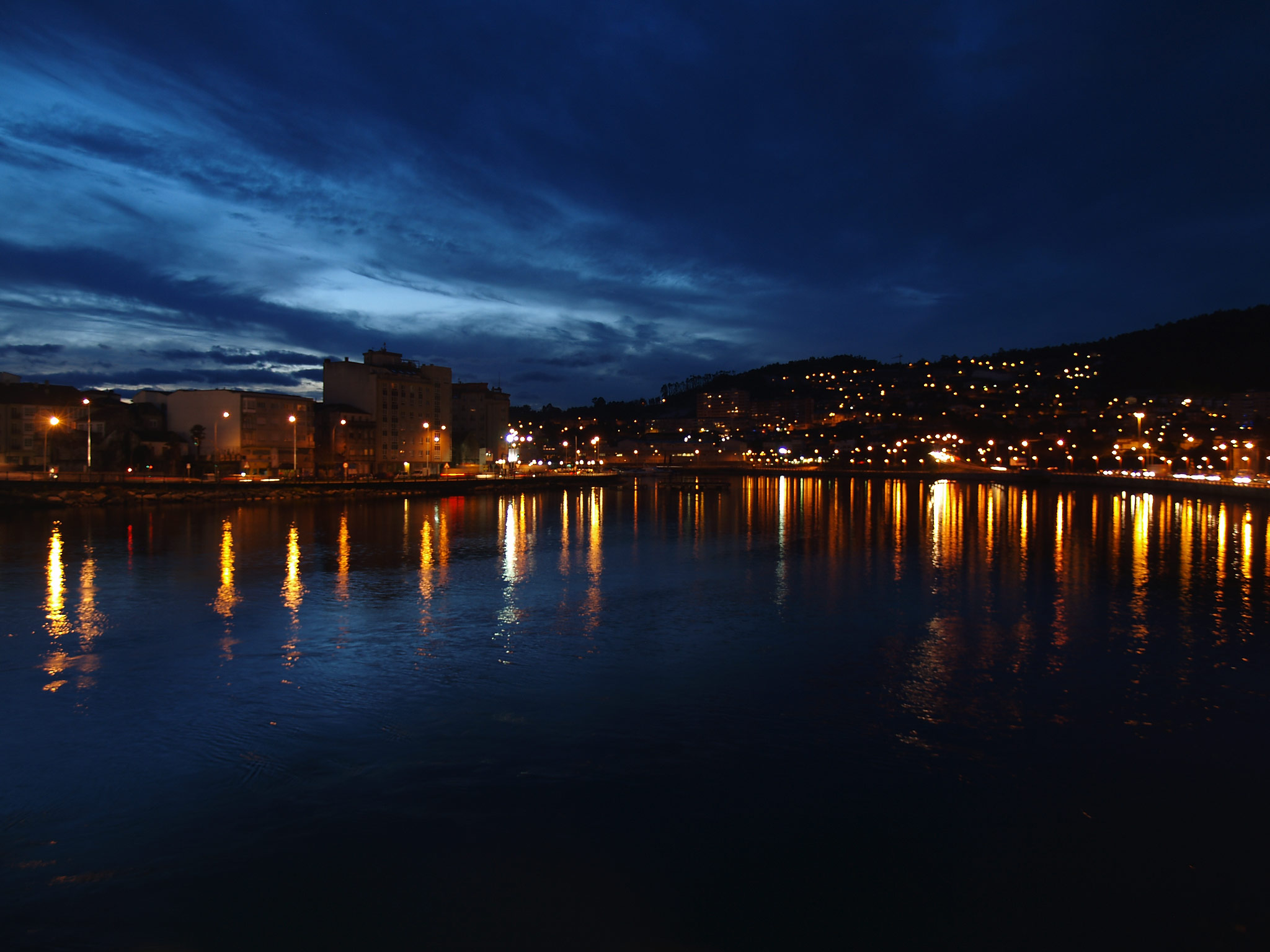
The city by its Ria

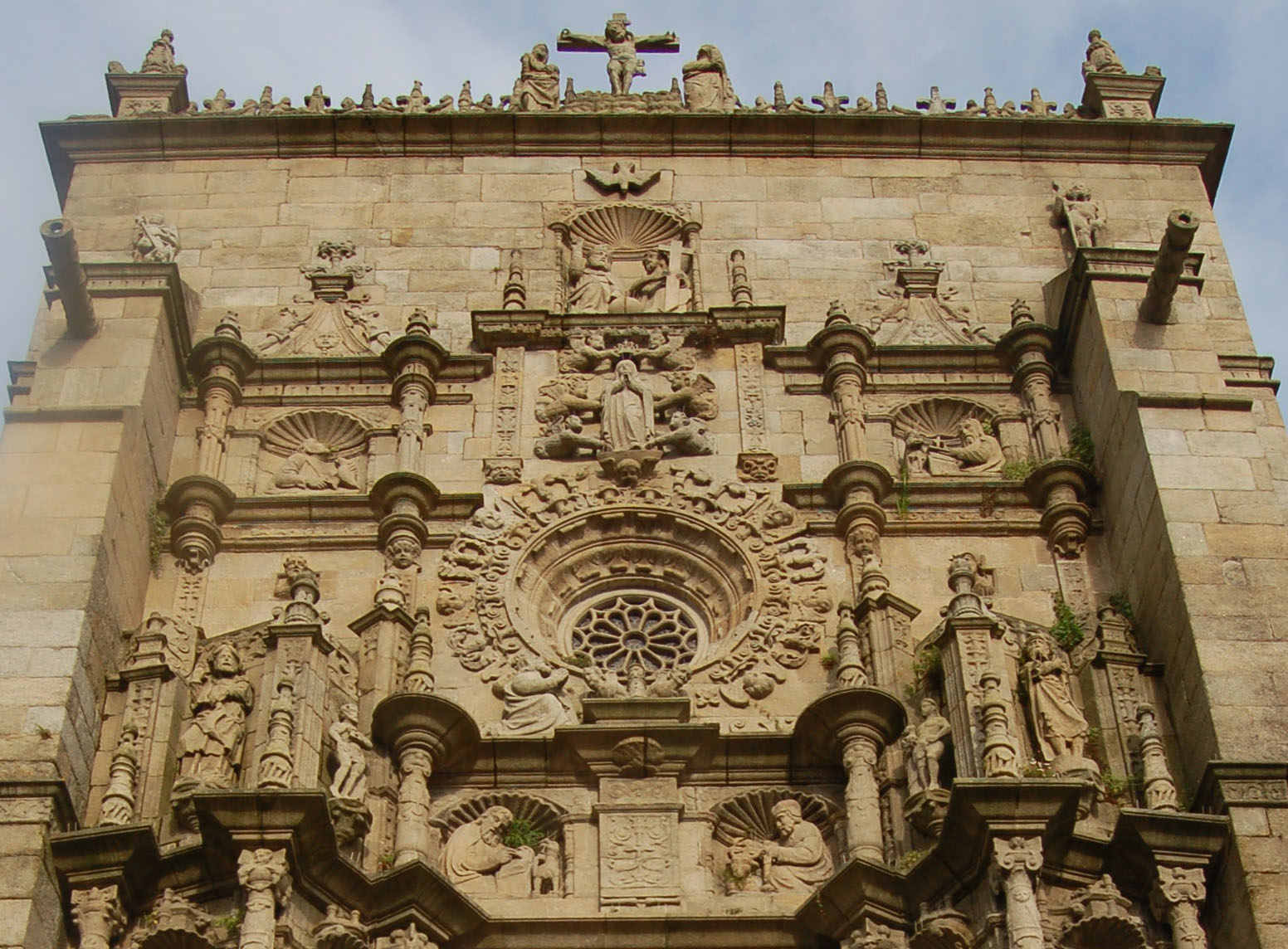
Upper part of Santa María Basilica façade

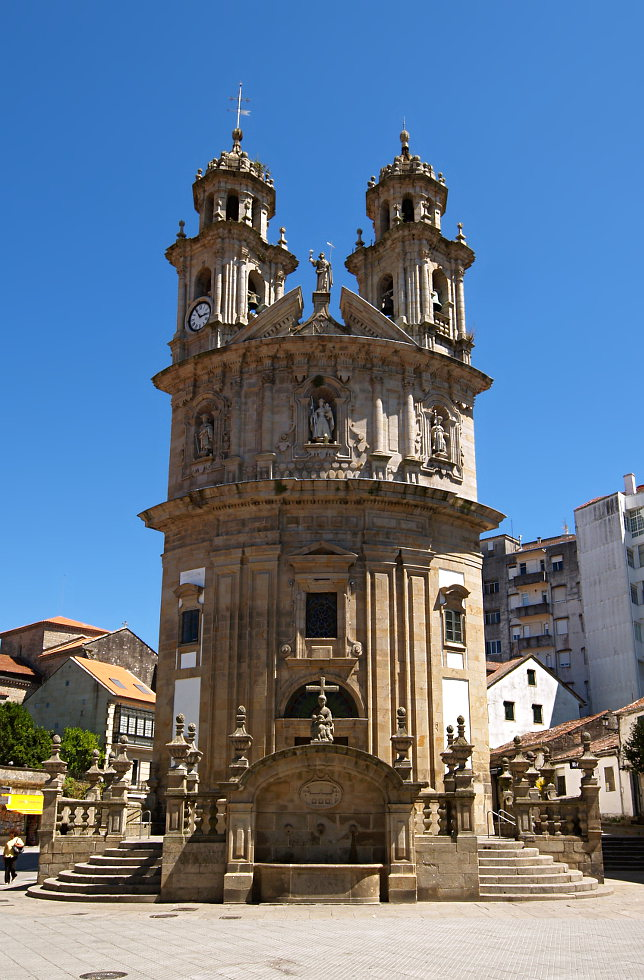
Round Baroque Pilgrim Church

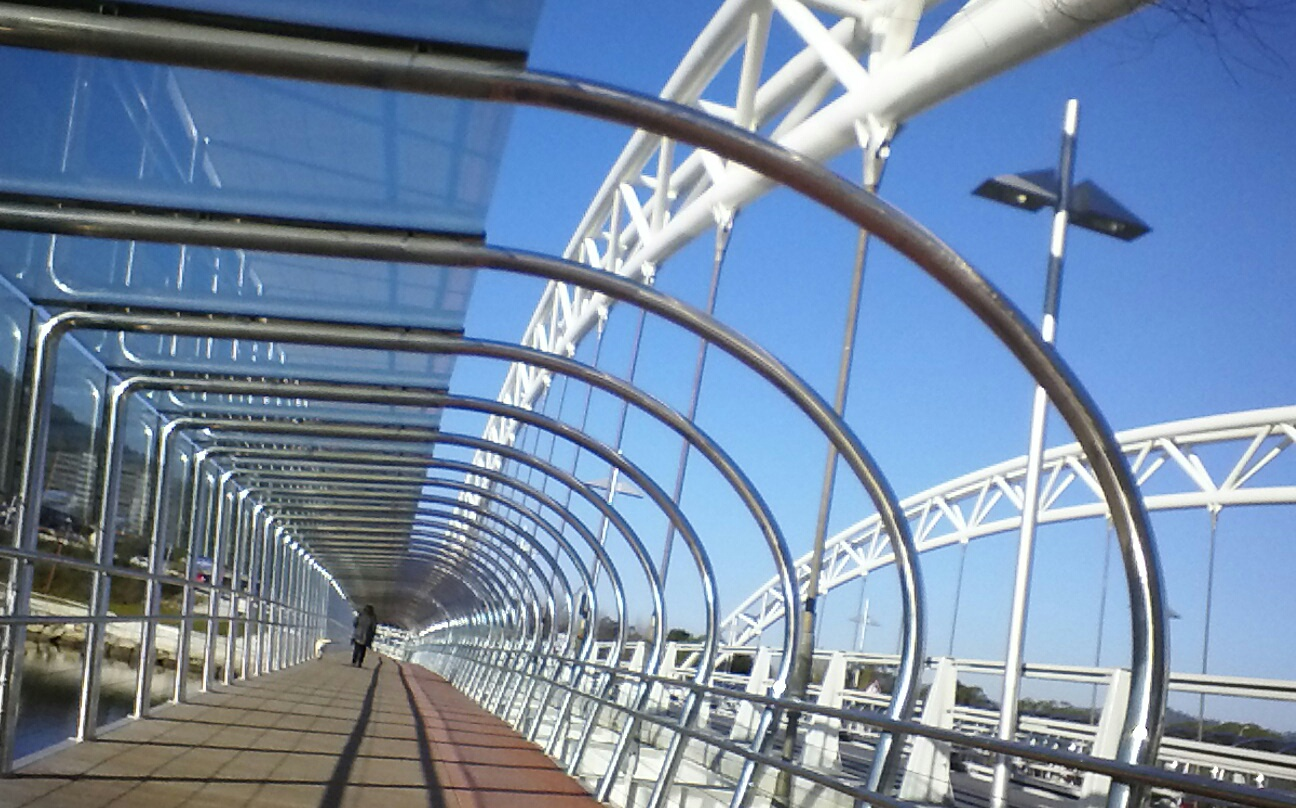
Correntes Bridge, from the inside

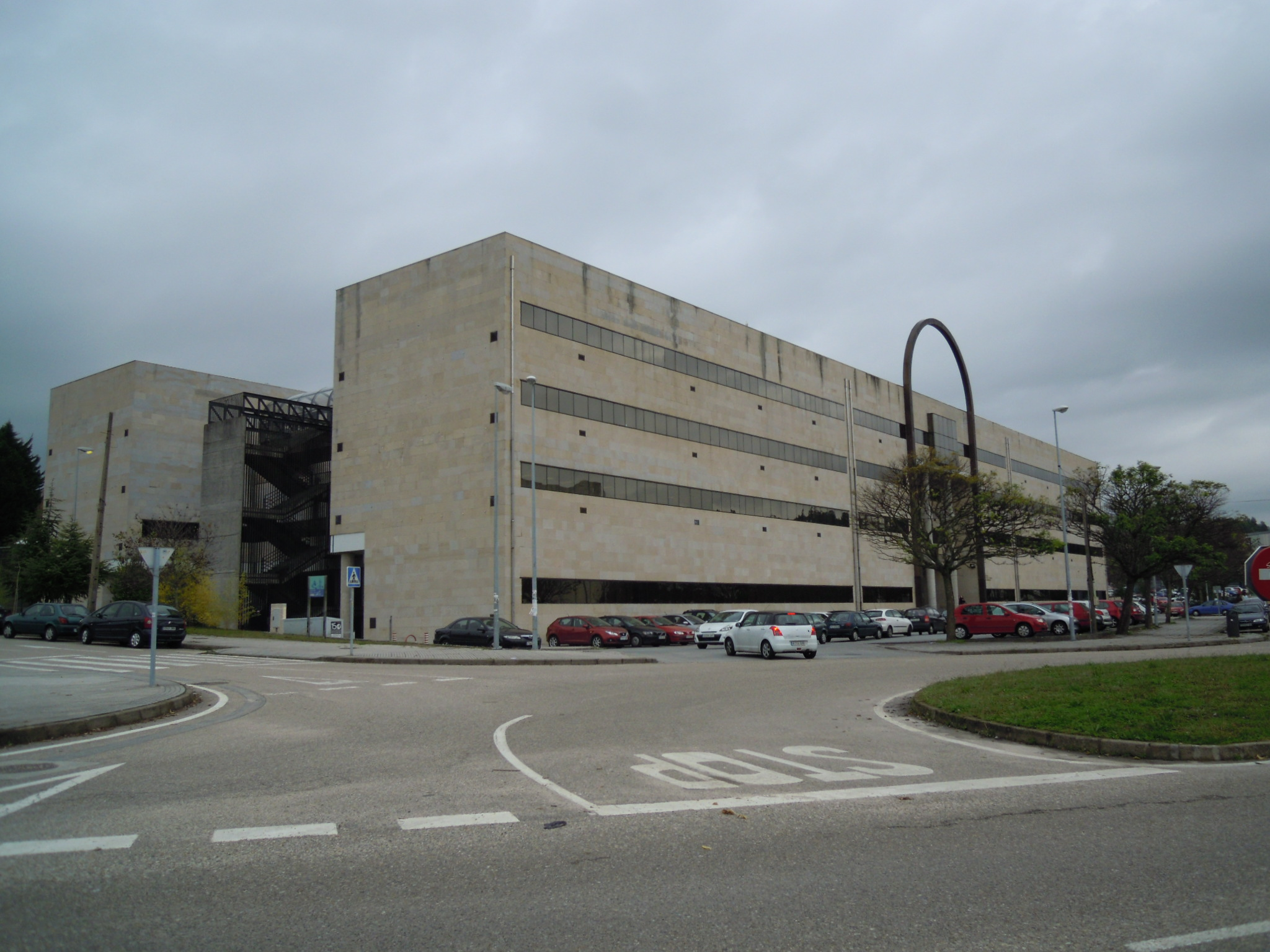
Faculty of Social and Communication Sciences

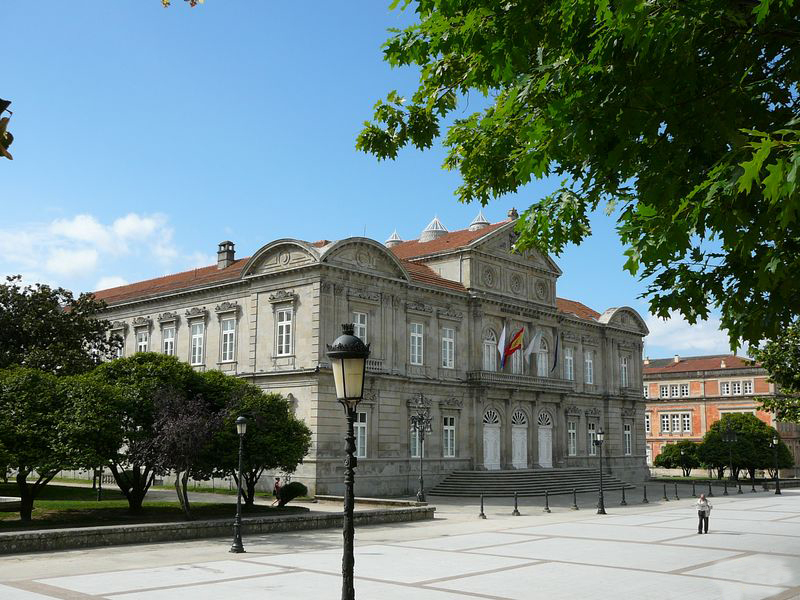
19th century palace, Headquarters of the Provincial Council

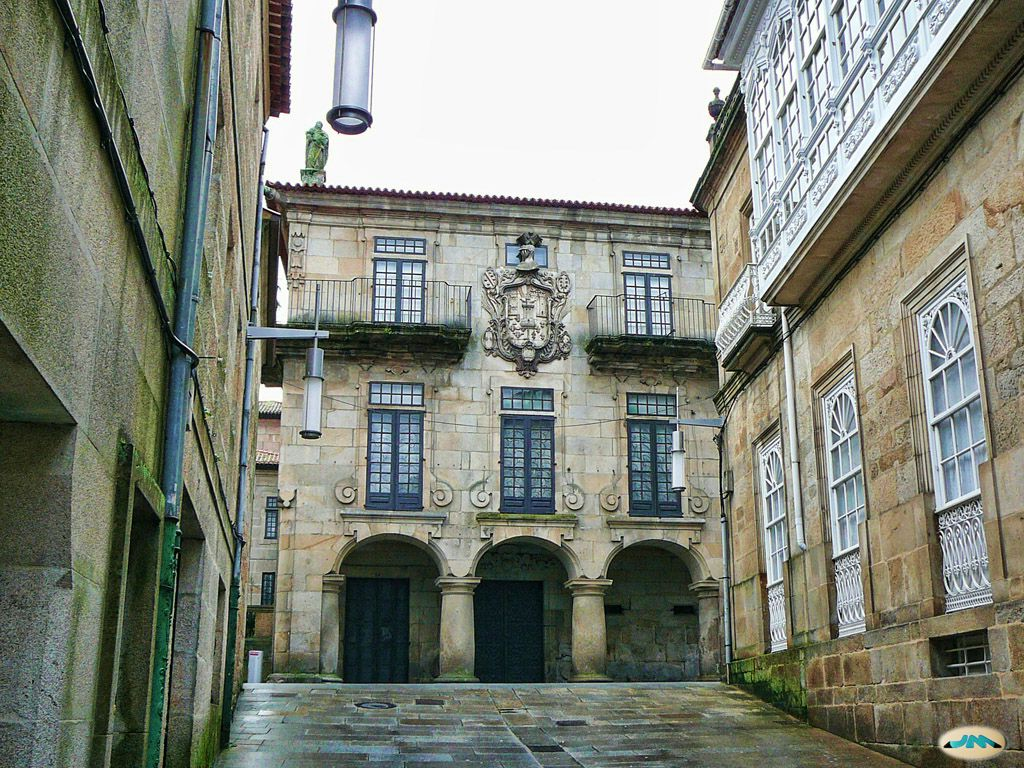
Museum of Pontevedra Baroque Palace

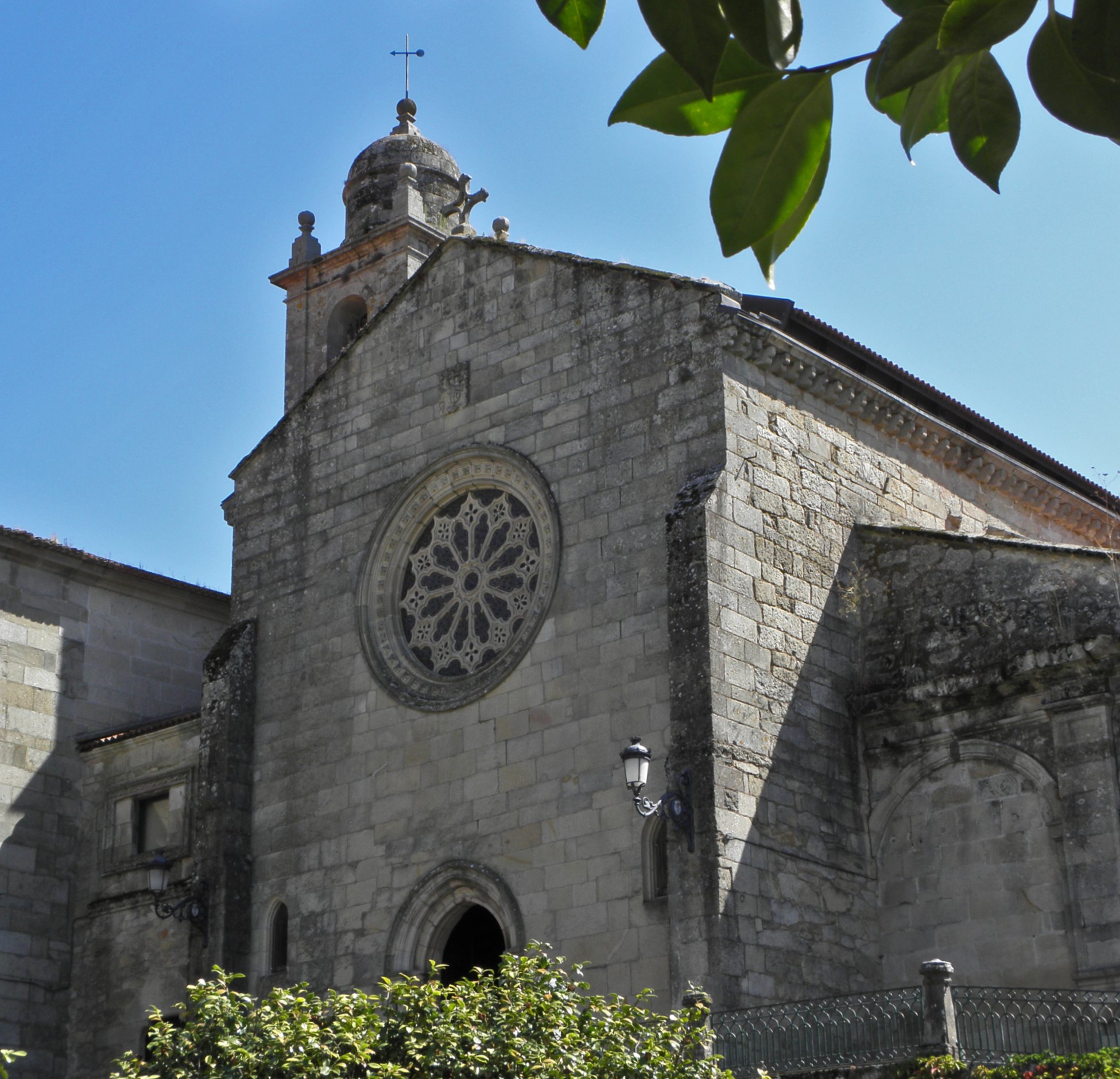
Gothic church of San Francisco

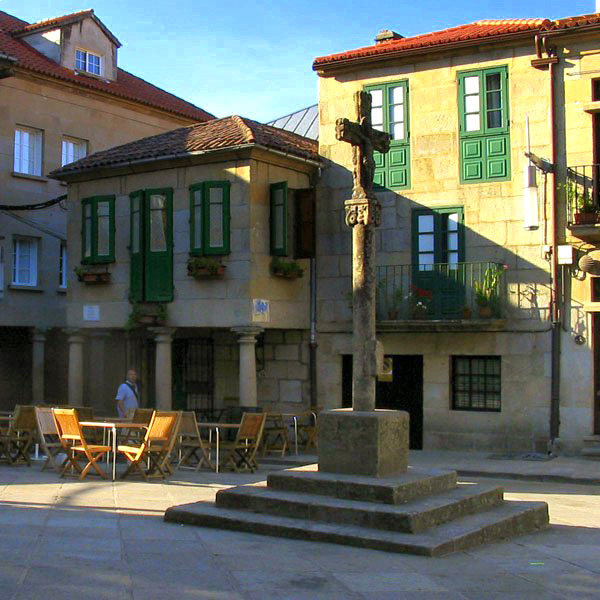
Leña square

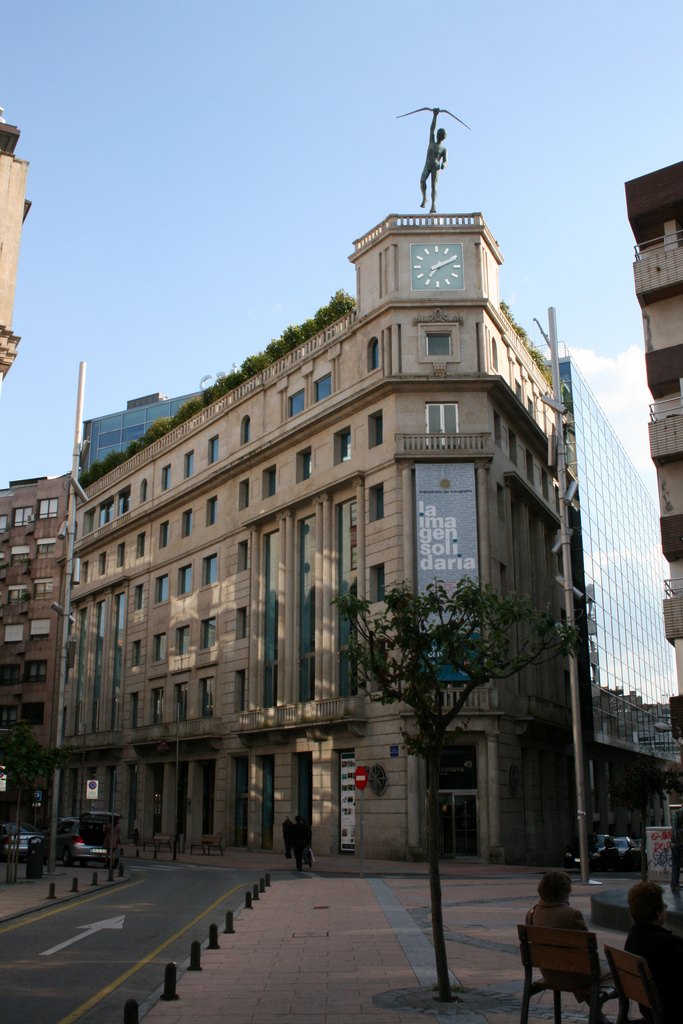
Cultural Centre and Concert Hall

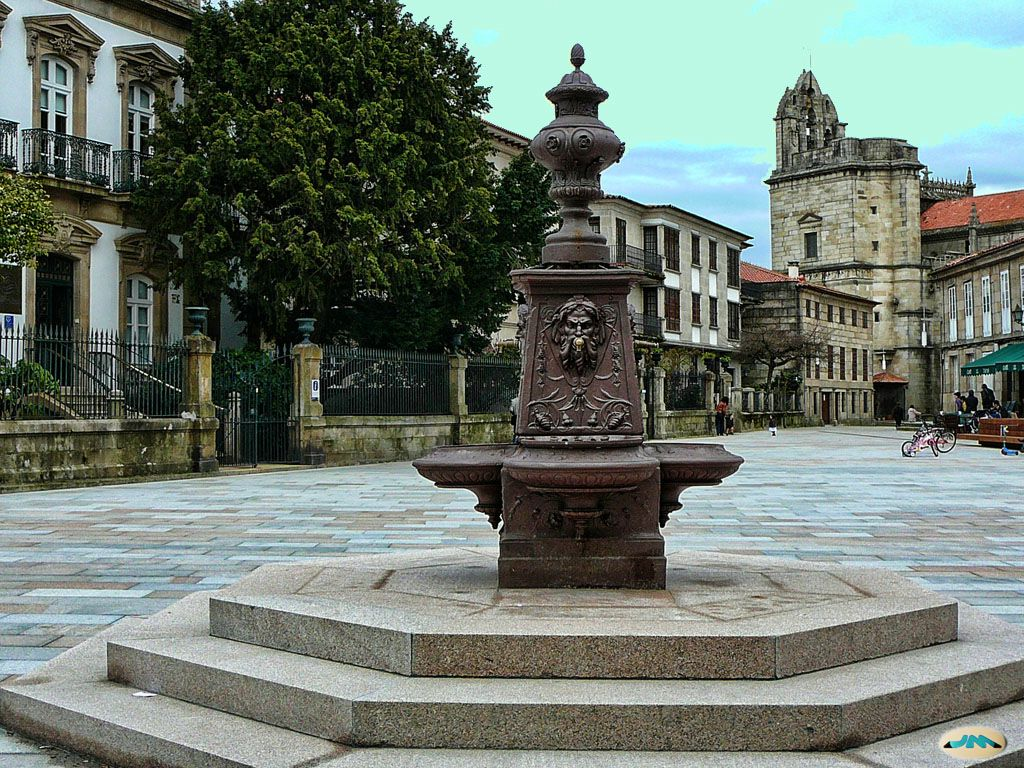
Santa Maria square

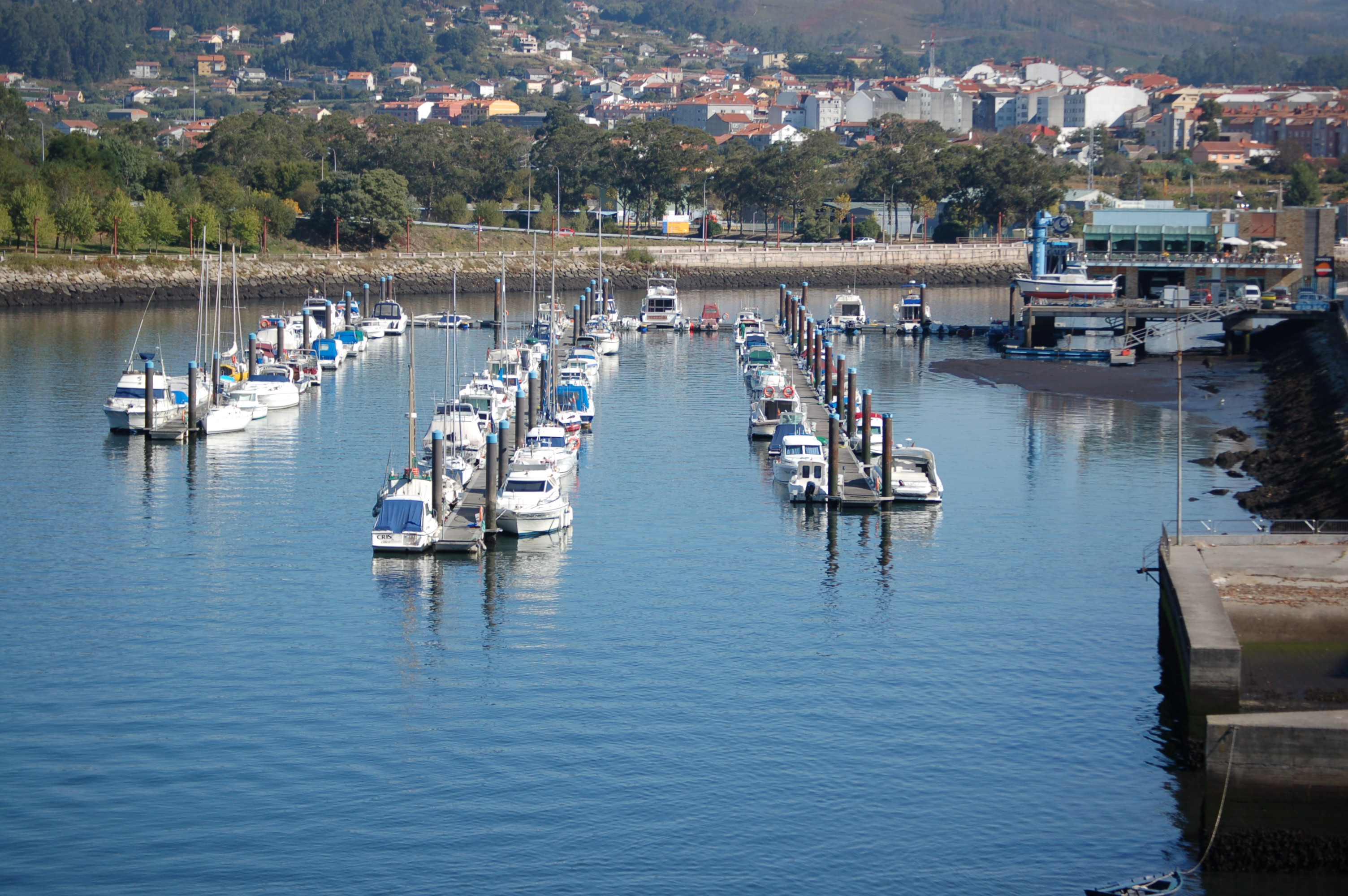
Marina of Pontevedra, between Barca Bridge and Correntes Bridge

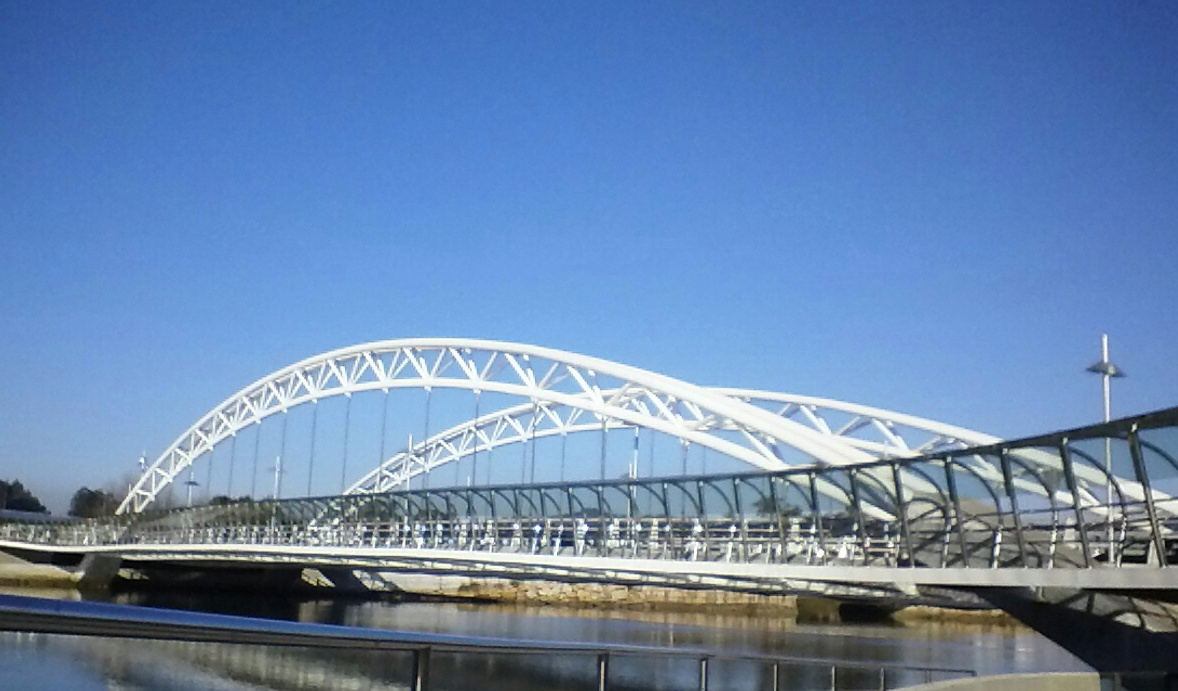
Correntes Bridge

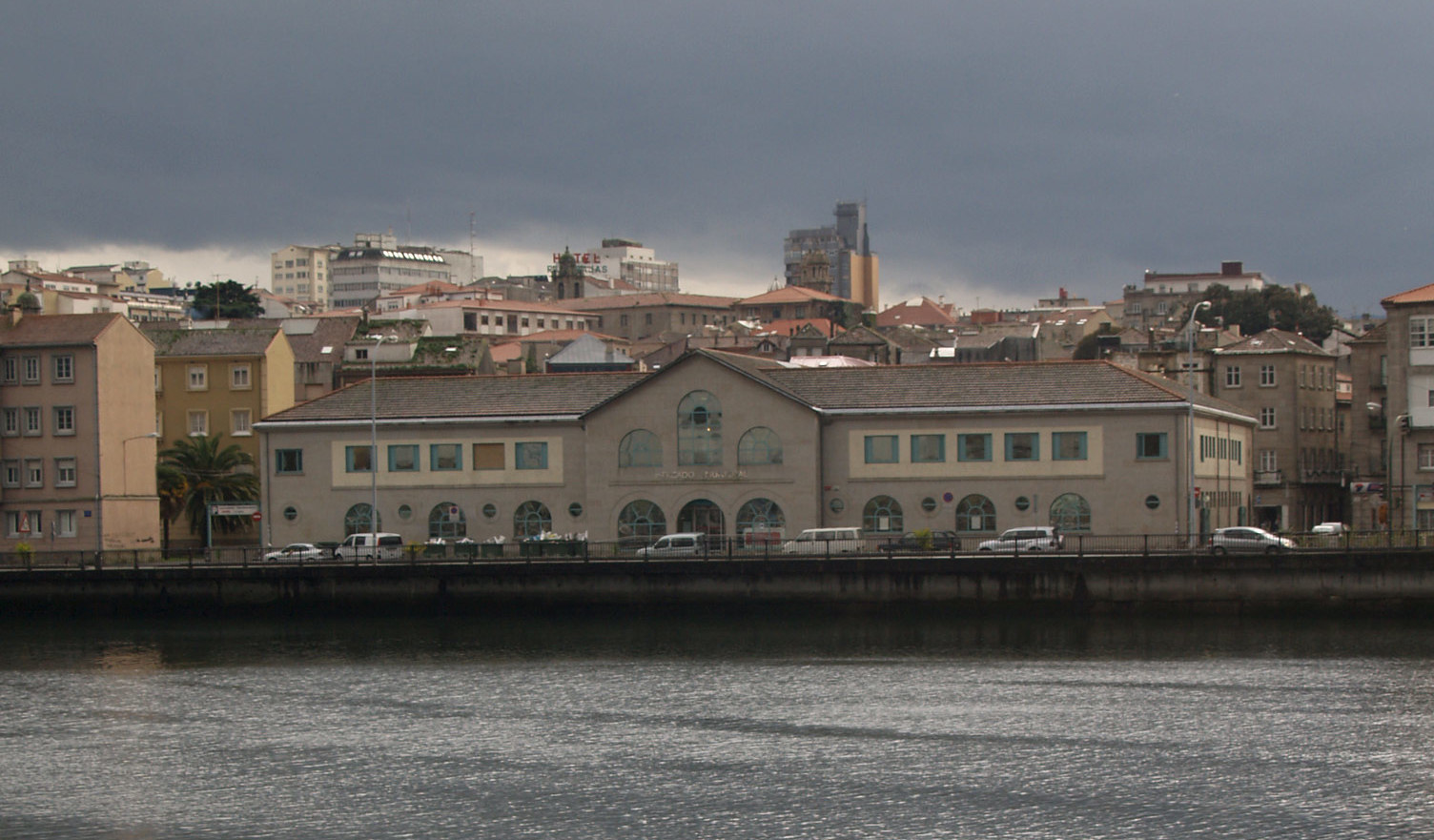
Market and Lérez River

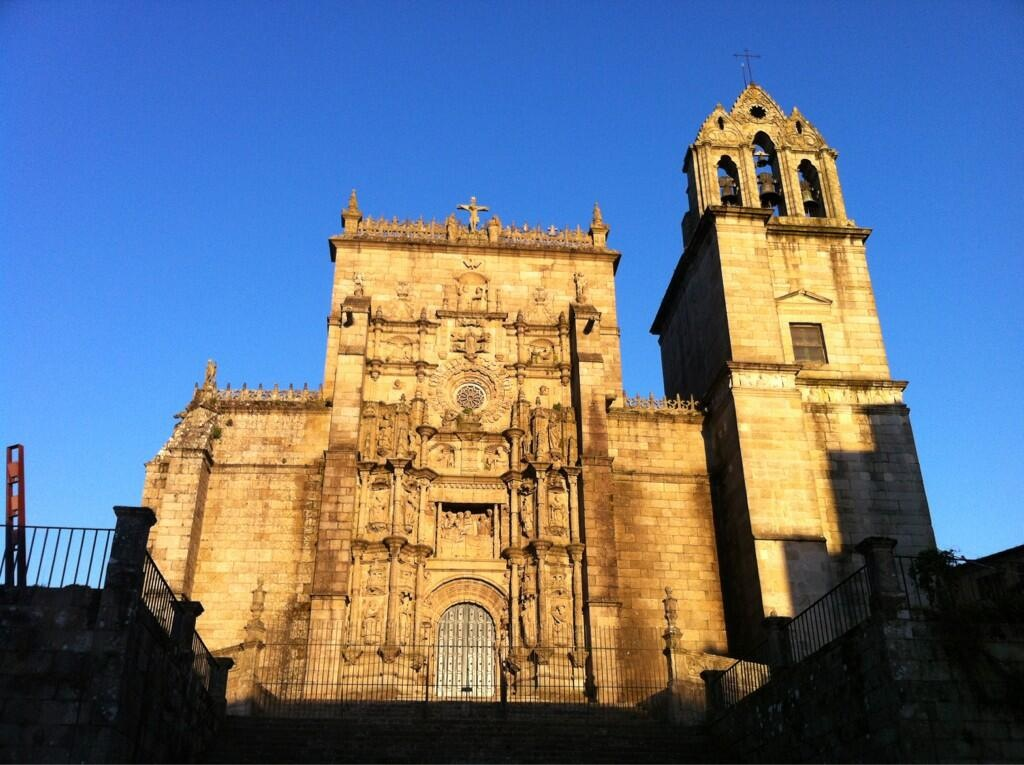
Renaissance basilica Santa Maria

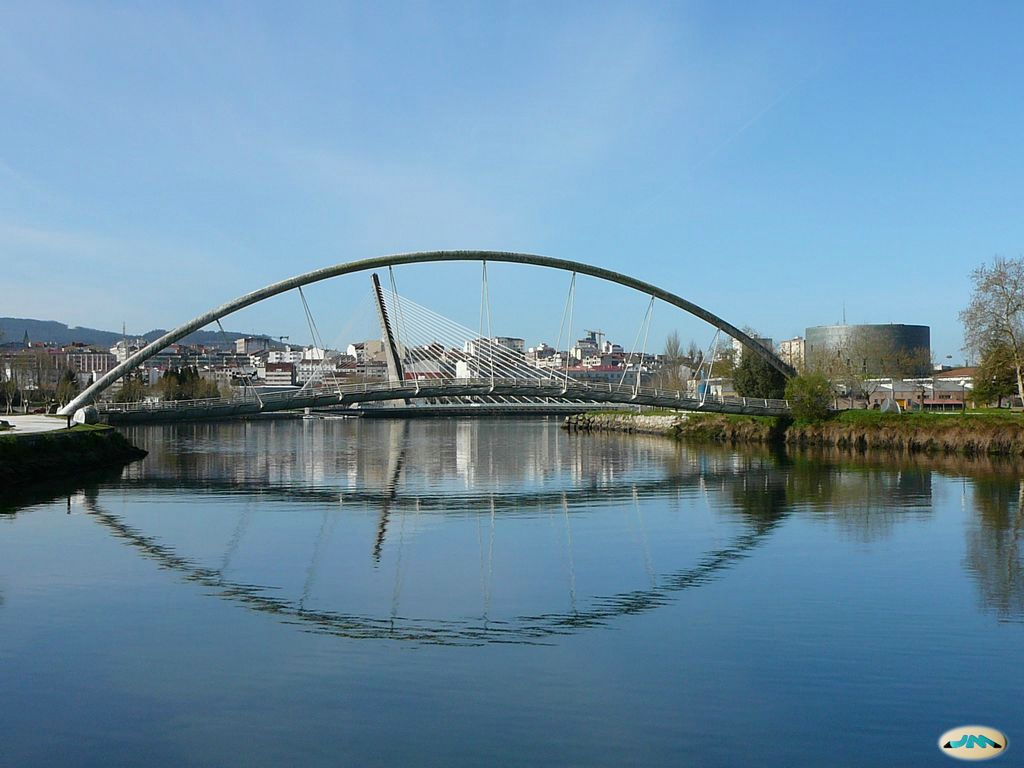
Footbridge and Tirantes Bridge over Lérez River

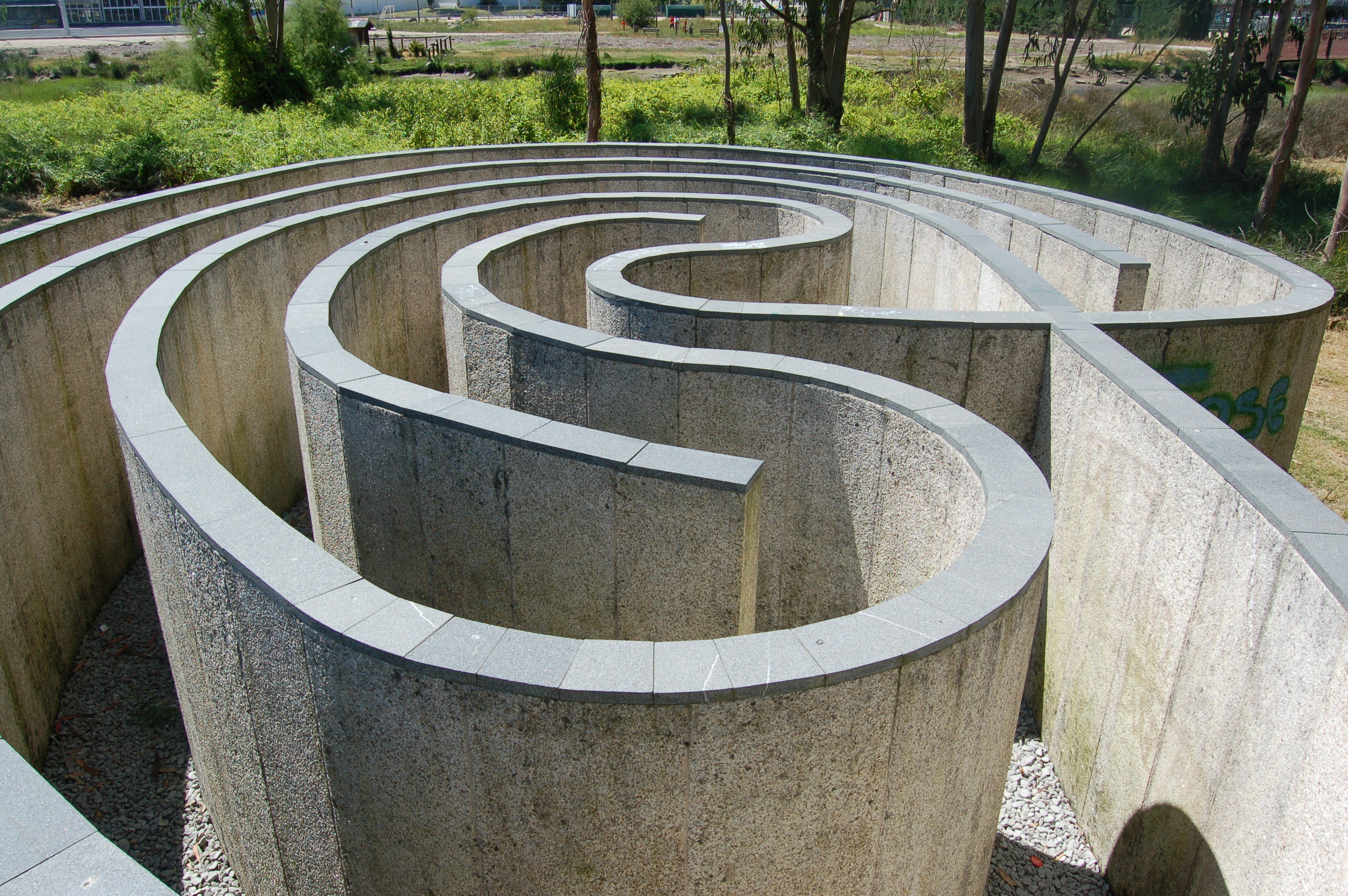
Labyrinth of Pontevedra, Robert Morris

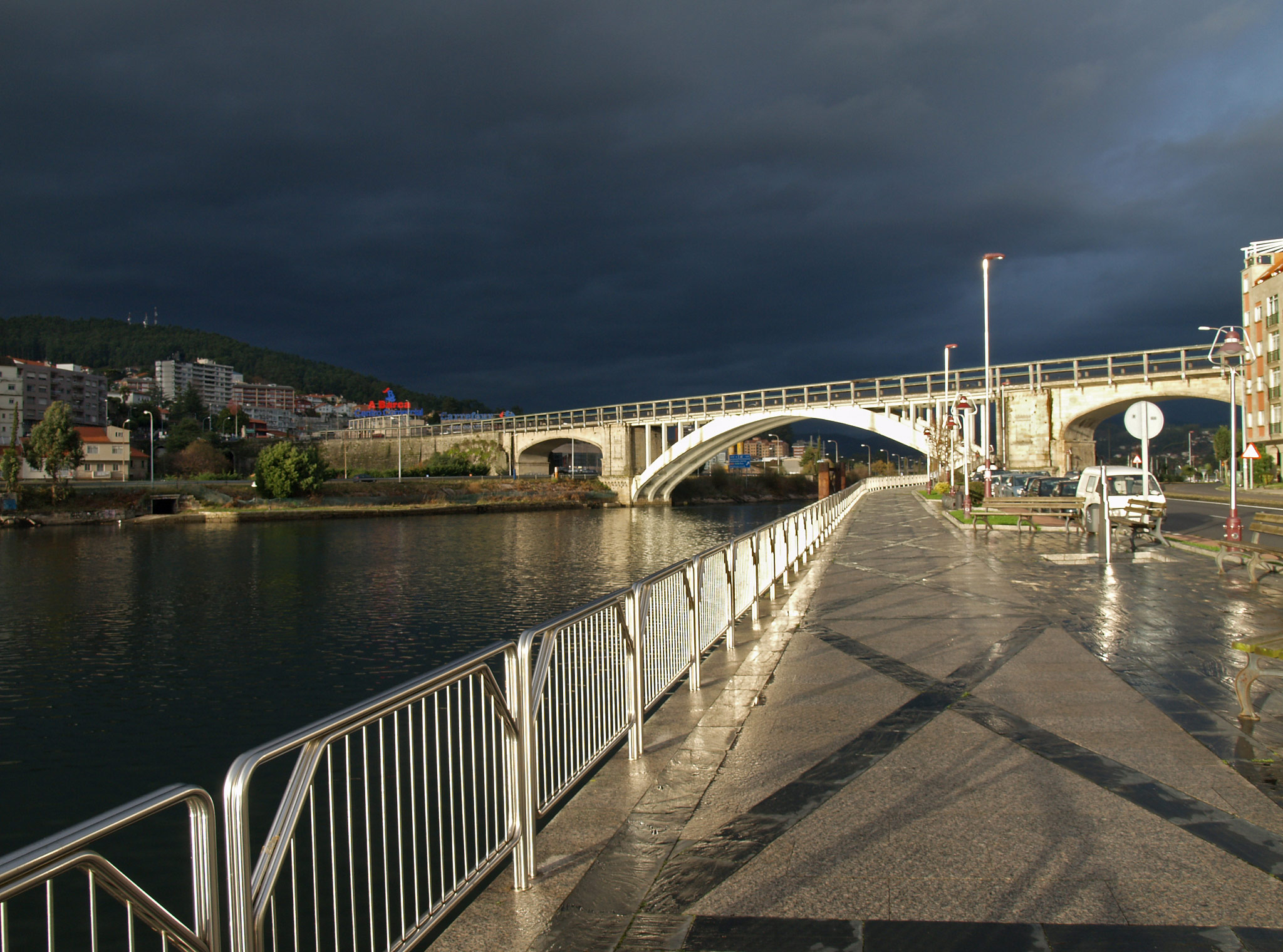
Pontevedra Ria and Barca Bridge

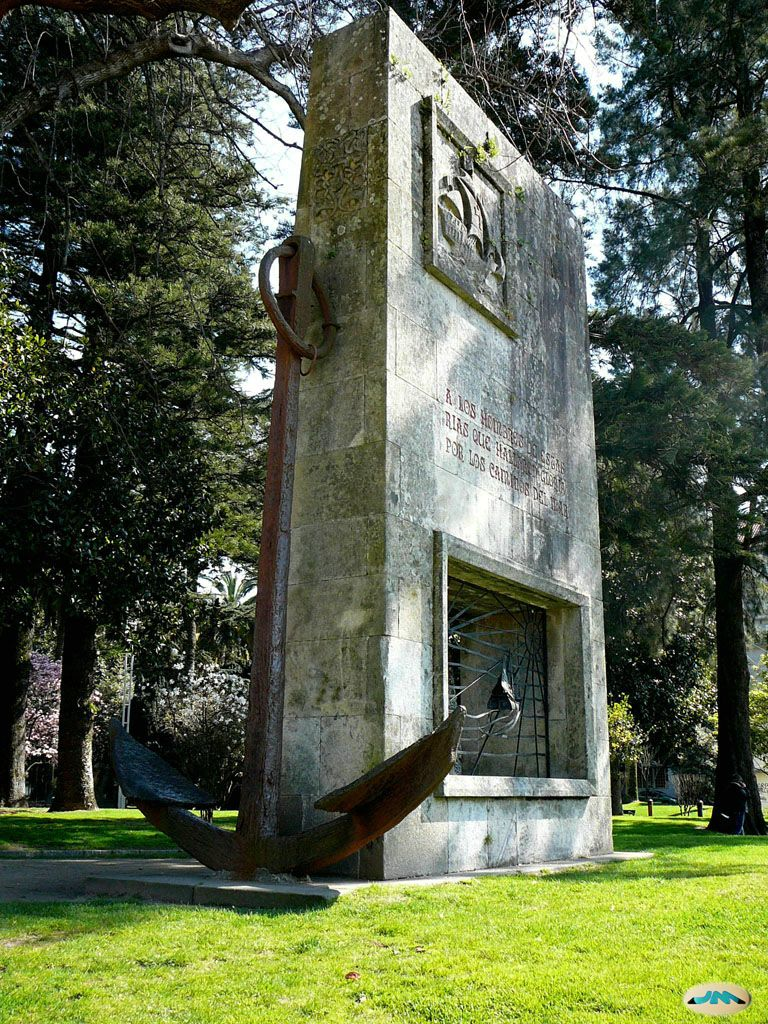
Sailors Monument

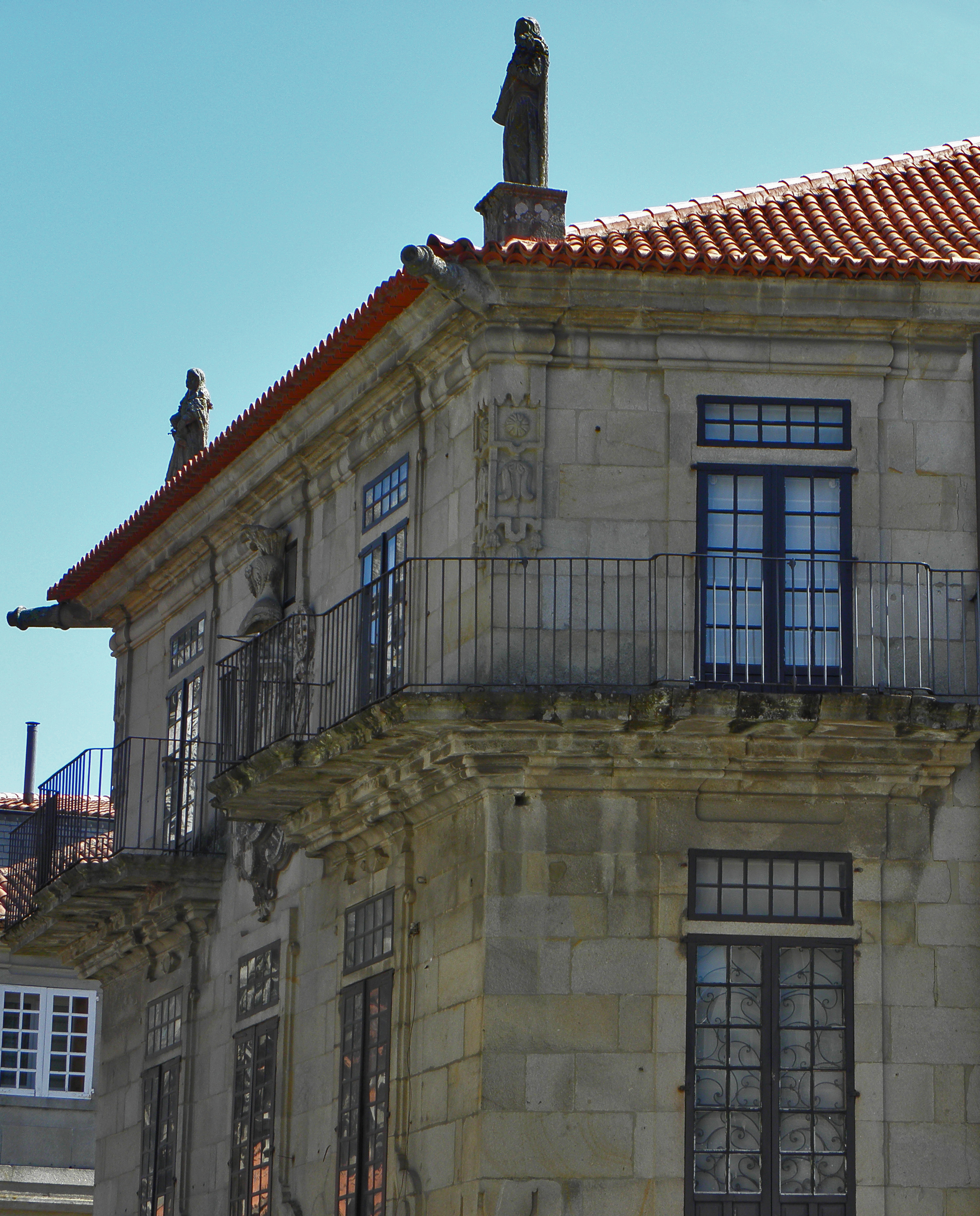
García Flórez Palace, Pontevedra Museum

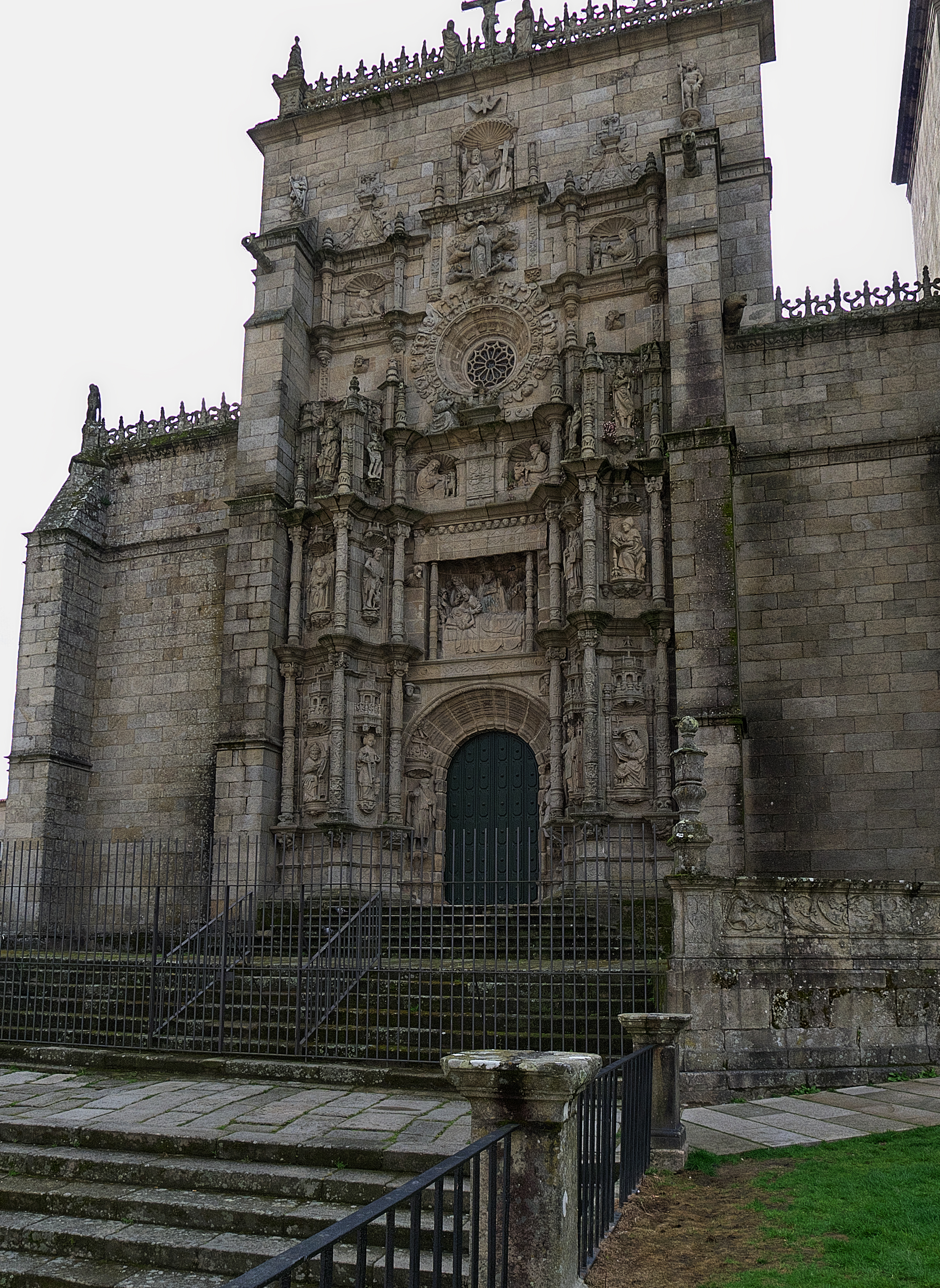
Santa María Basilica

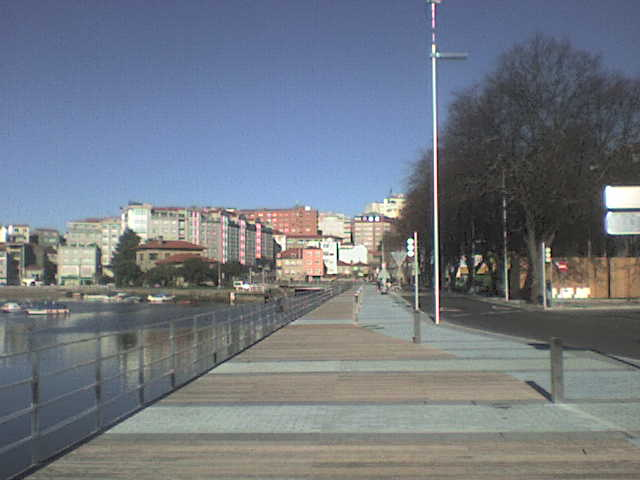
Promenade by the sea

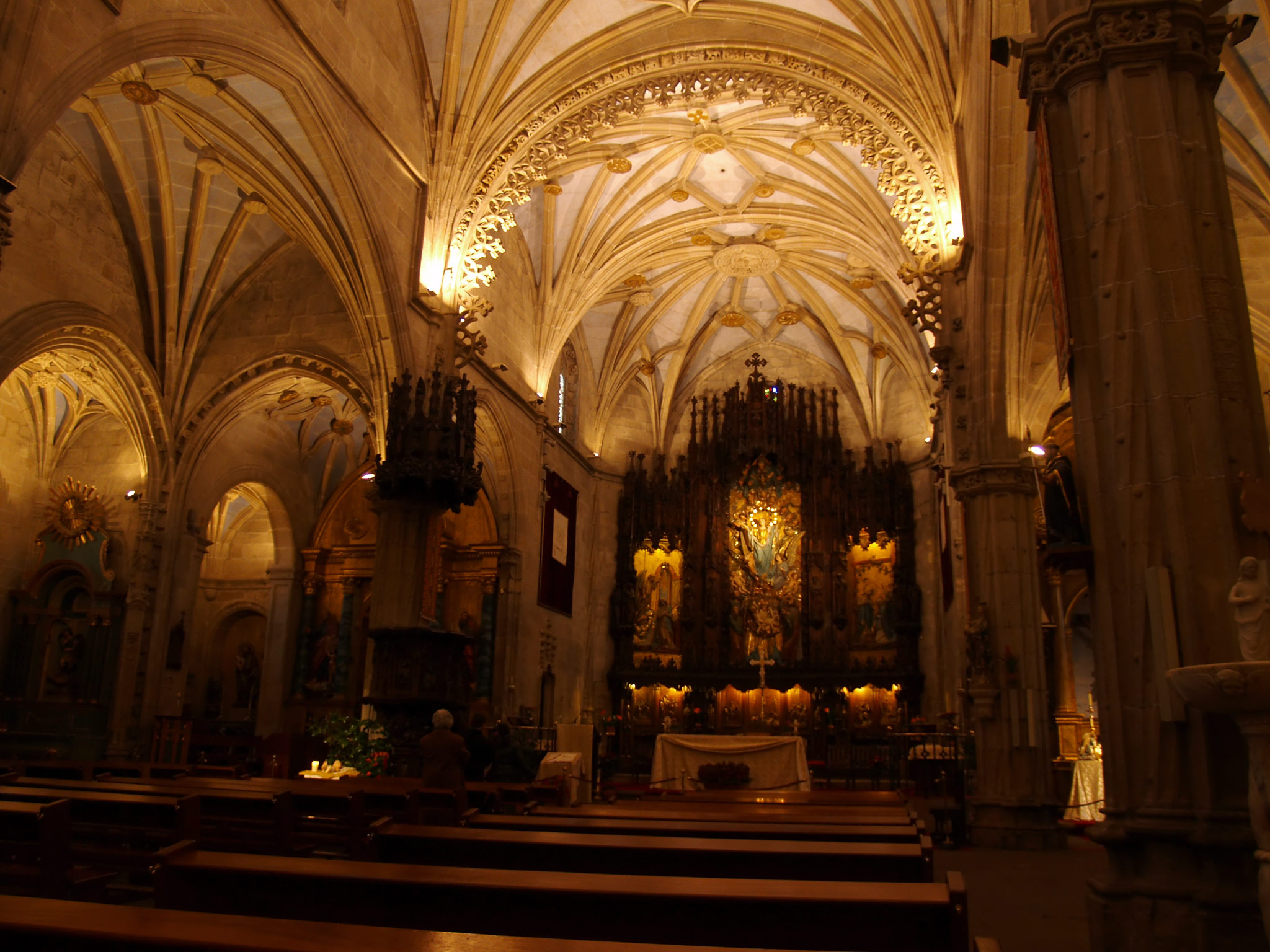
Santa Maria Basilica, inside

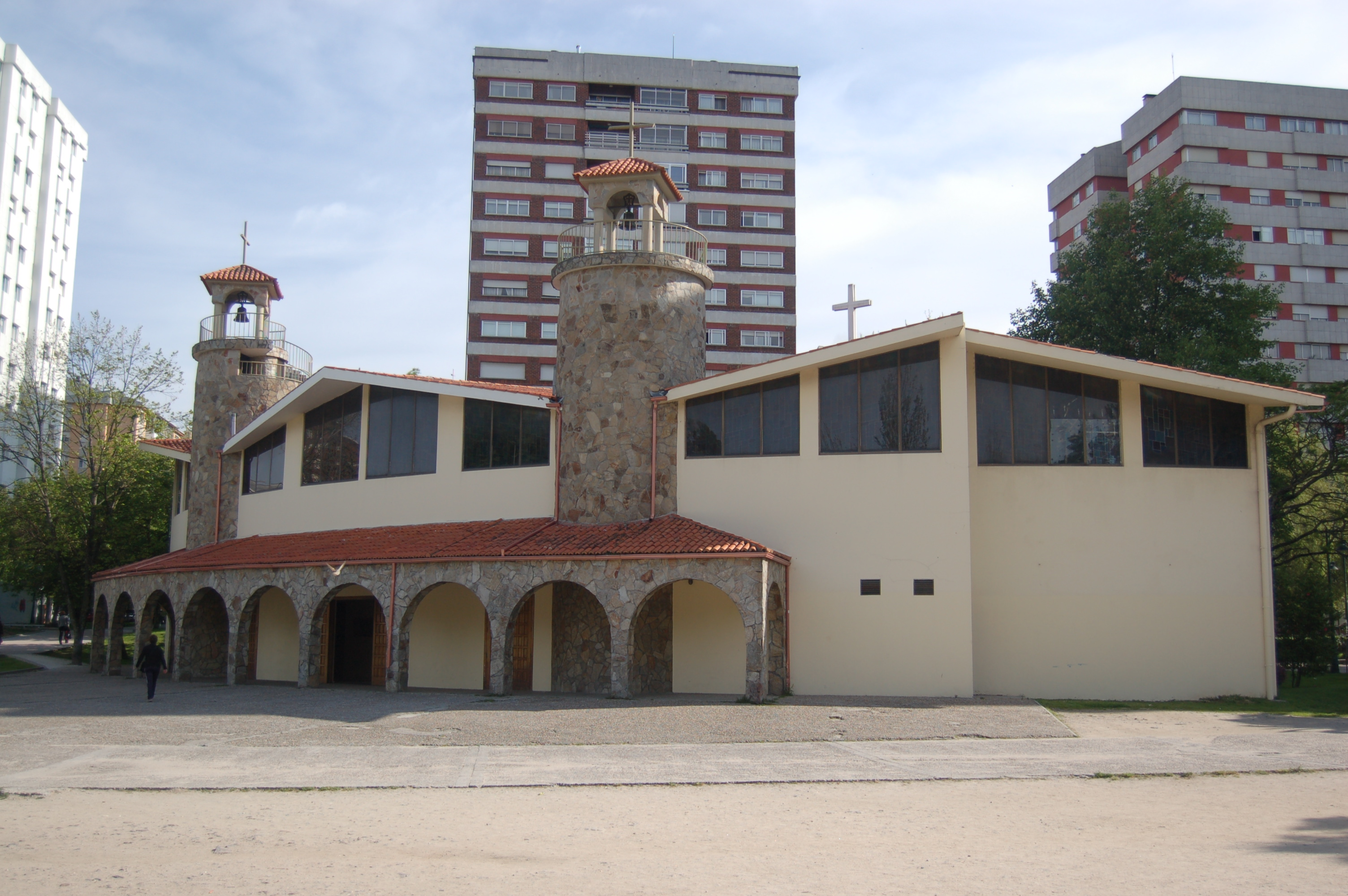
San Xosé church in the Campolongo district

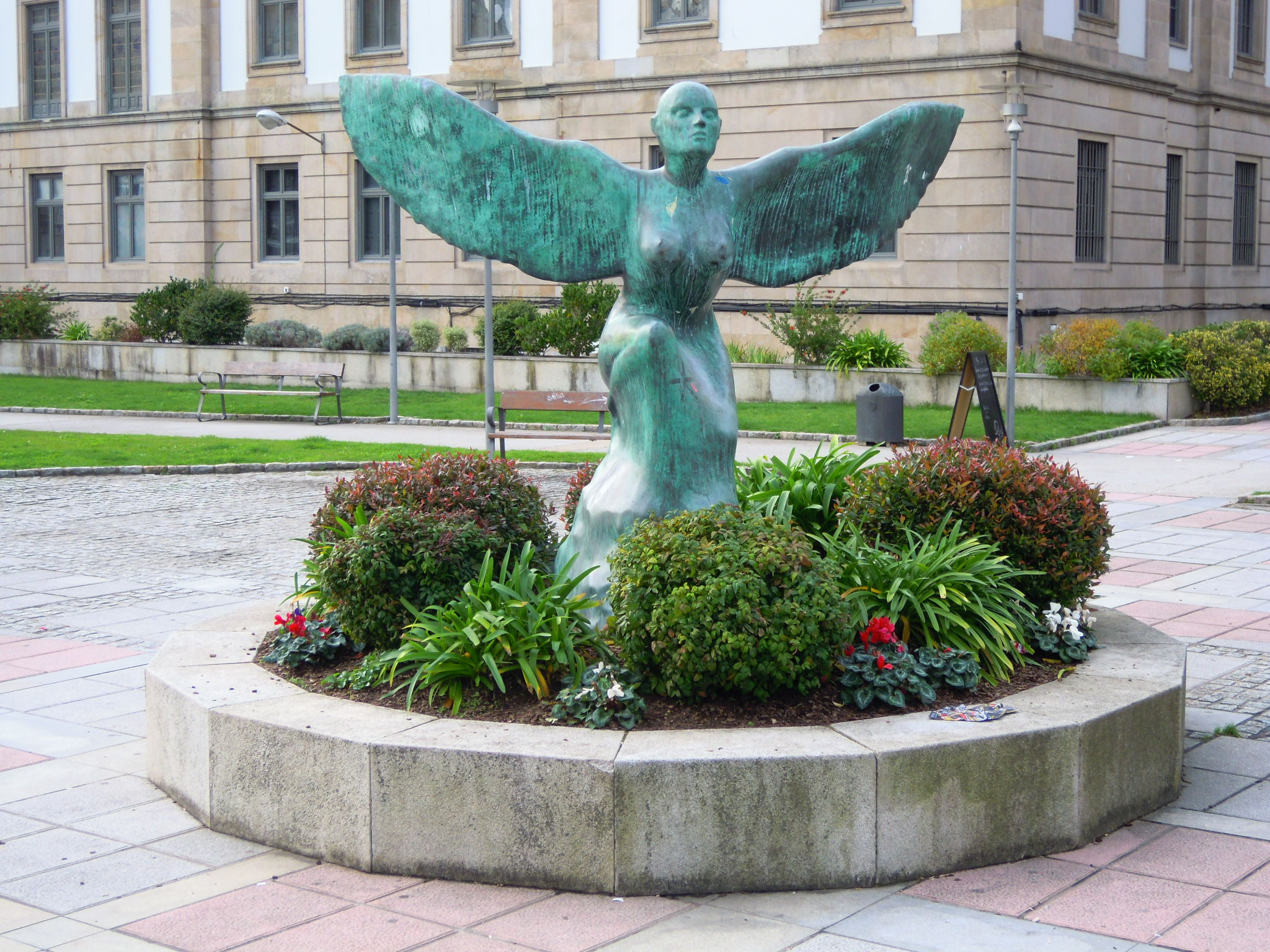
Liberty square

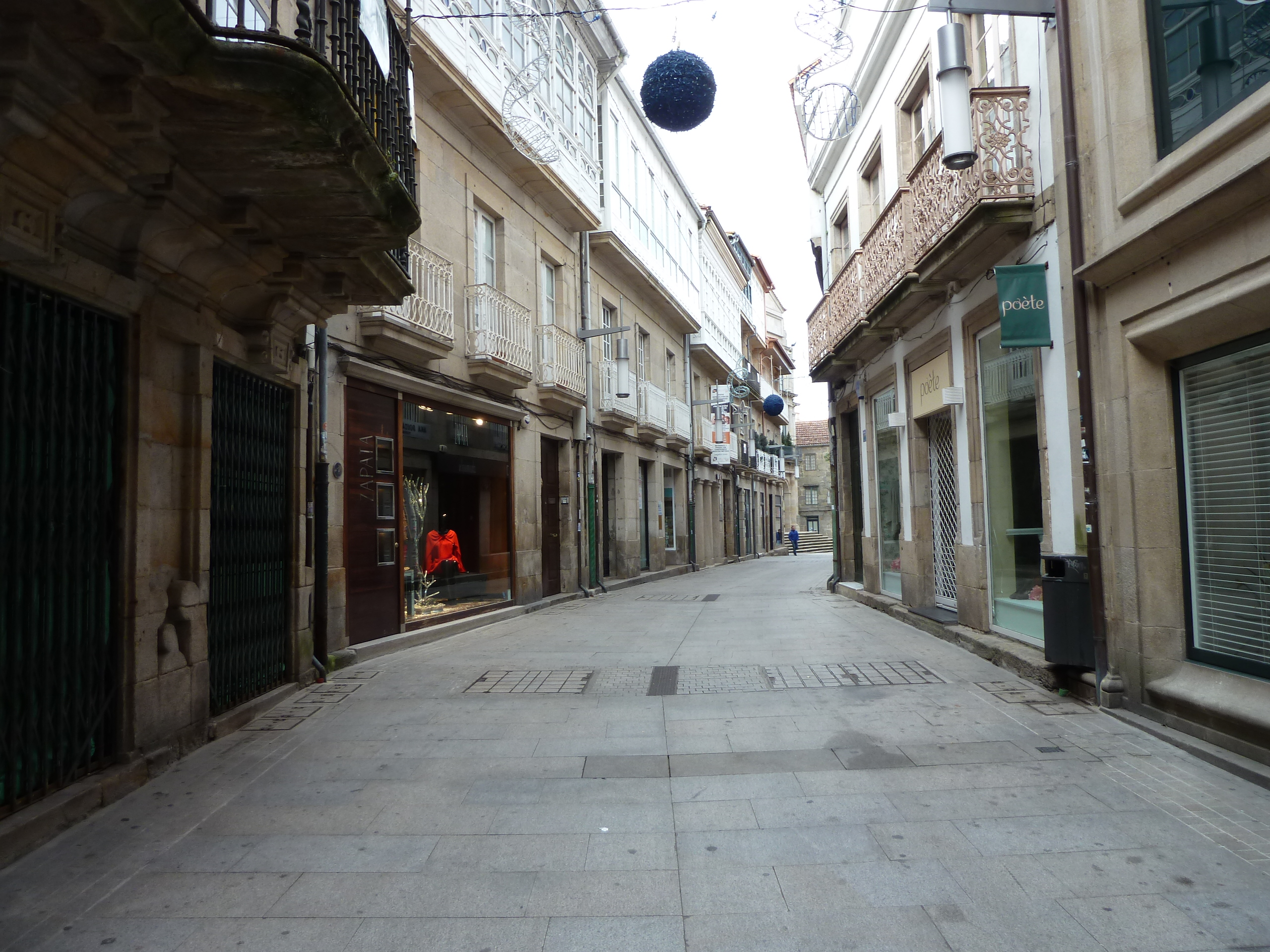
Manuel Quiroga street

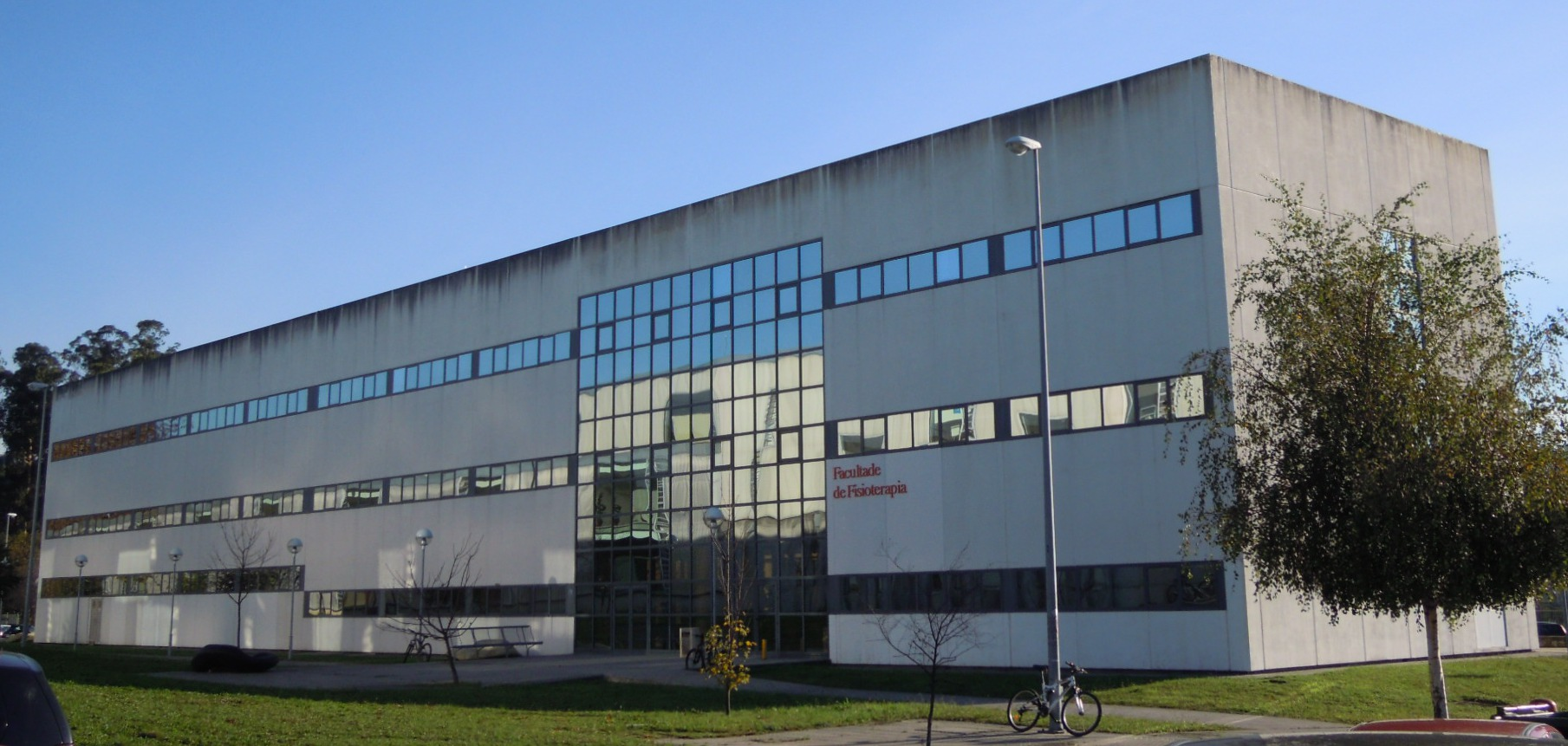
Physiotherapy Faculty

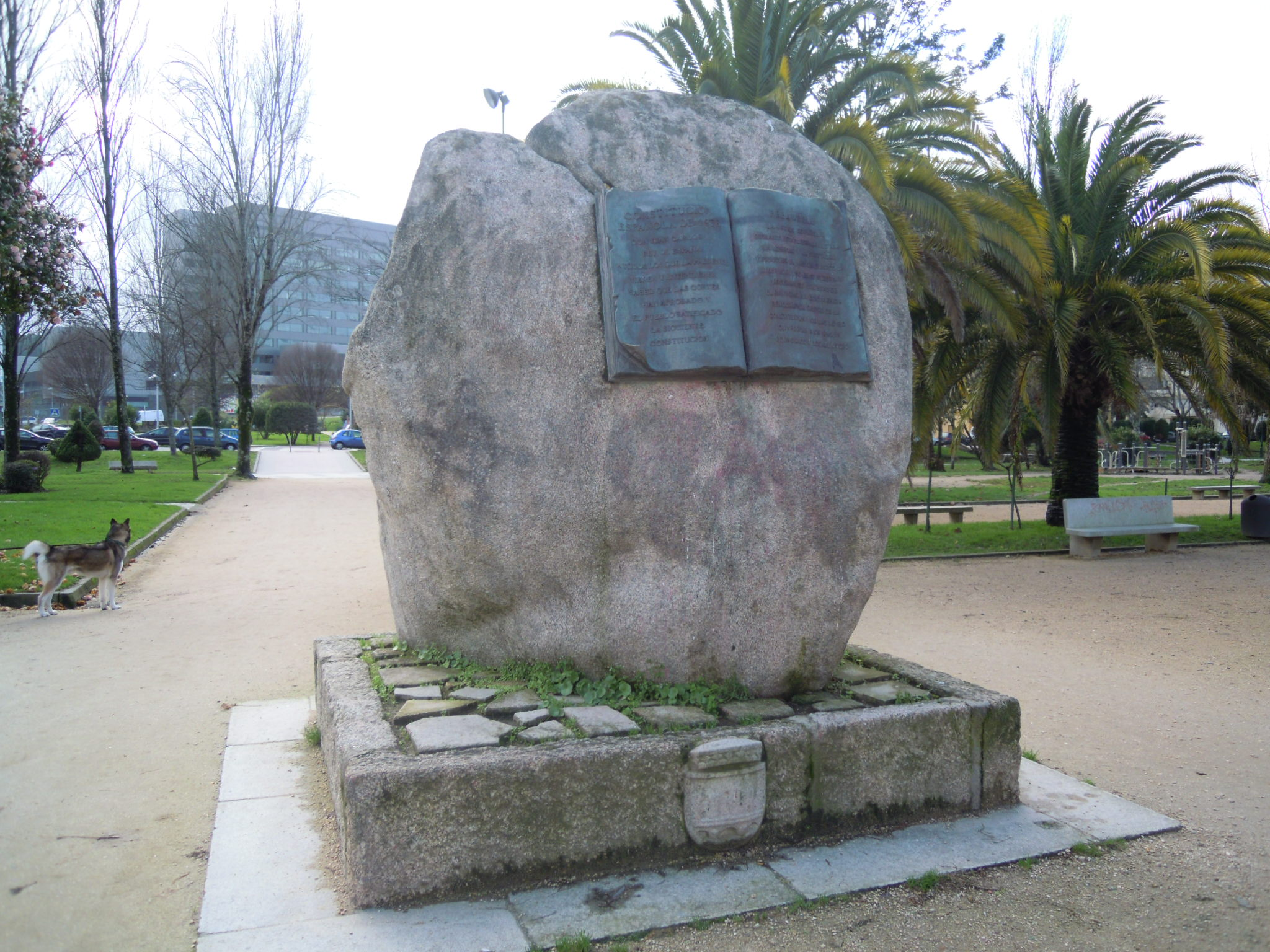
Constitution square

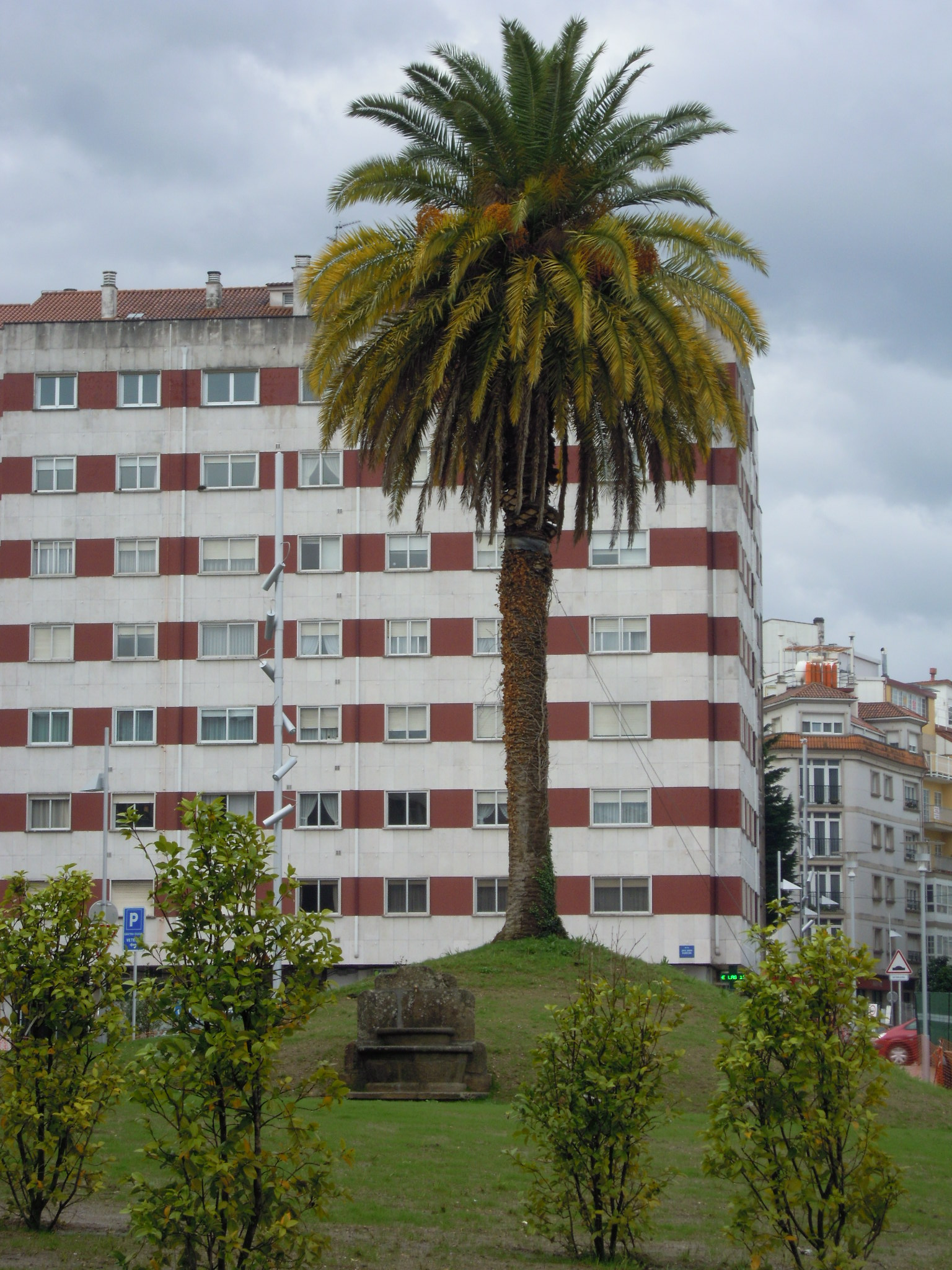
Eiriña Fountain

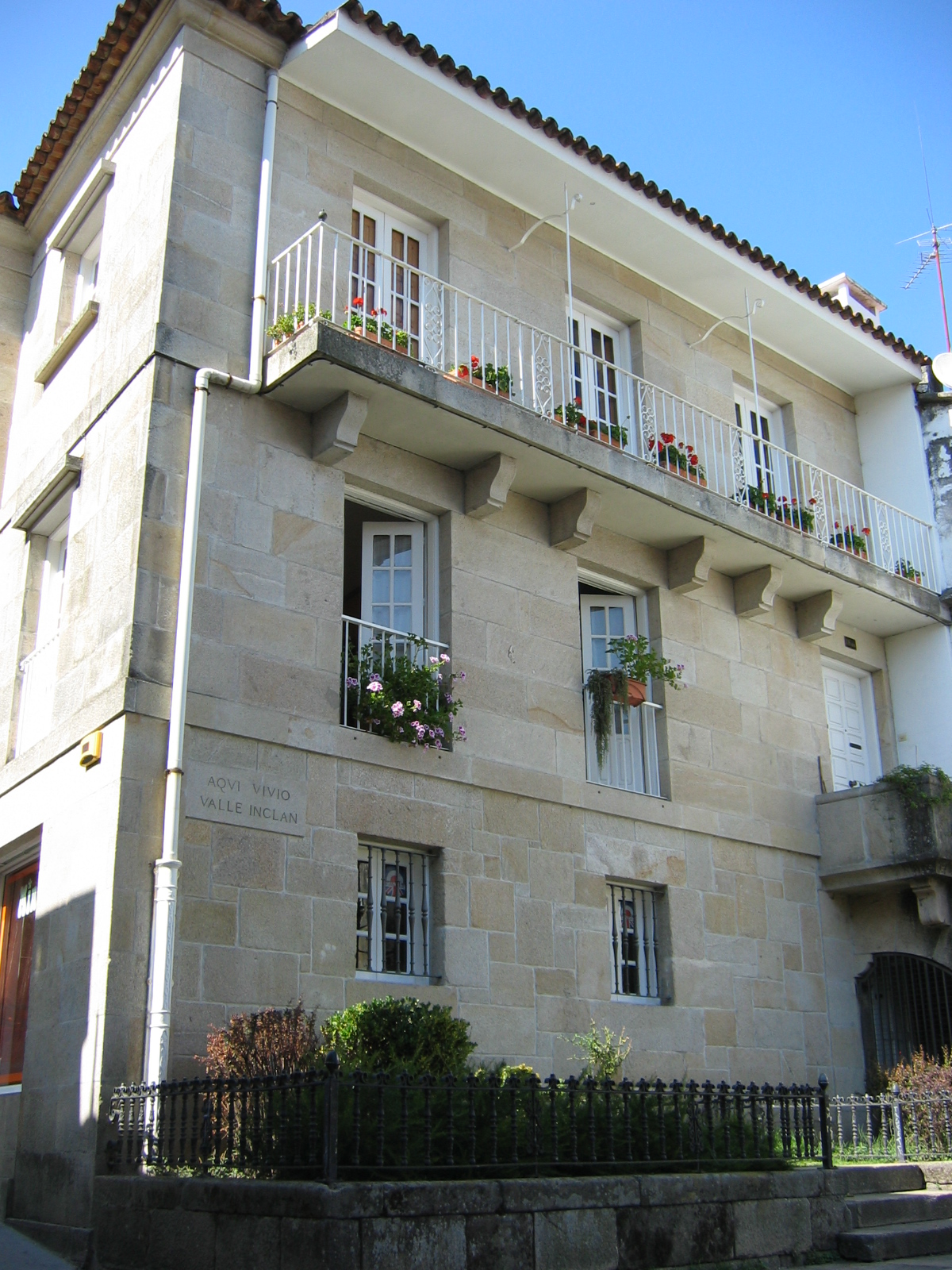
Valle-Inclán's House

== See also ==
- Asociación pola defensa da ría
- List of municipalities in Pontevedra
- Pontevedra apparitions
- Pontevedra (comarca)
- Rias Baixas
