= Building of the Official Association of Building Engineers and Technical Architects of Pontevedra =

Building in Pontevedra, Spain

- Edificio del Colegio Oficial de Aparejadores y Arquitectos Técnicos de Pontevedra
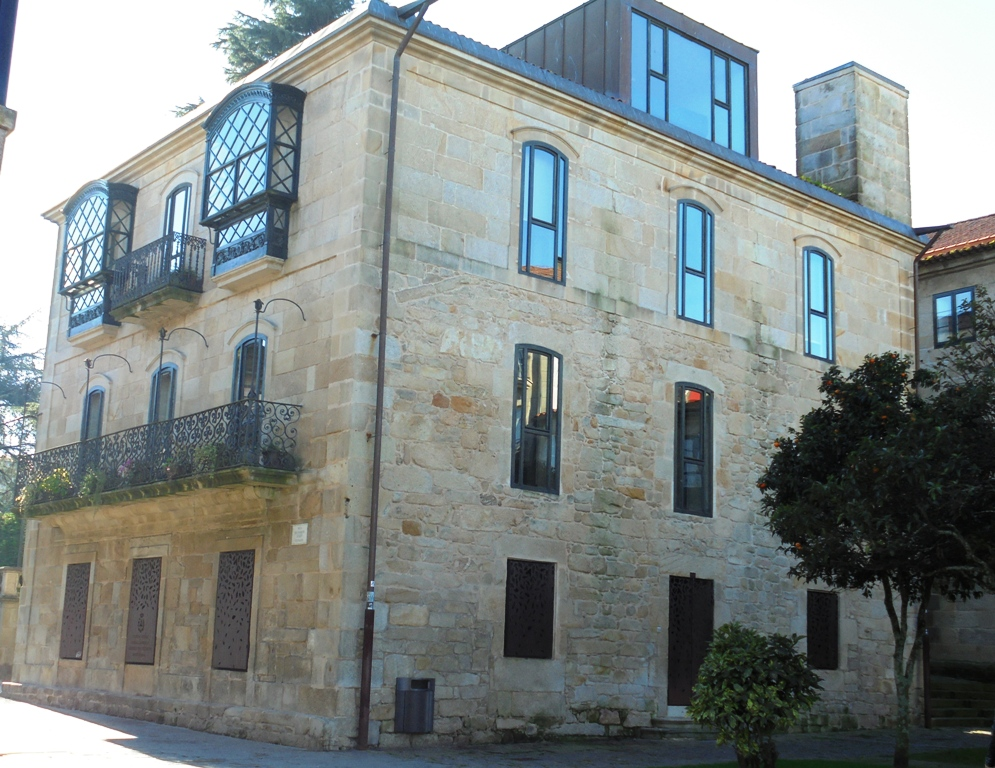
- Facades of the Quay Square and Barón Street
- Interactive map of the Building of the Official Association of Building Engineers and Technical Architects of Pontevedra area

General information
- Type: House
- Location: Pontevedra, Galicia, Spain
- Coordinates: 42°26′4.6″N 8°38′44.7″W
- Construction started: 19th century
- Completed: 1955
- Owner: Official Association of Building Engineers and Technical Architects of Pontevedra

Technical details
- Floor count: 4

Design and construction
- Architects: Juan Argenti Navajas and Celestino García Braña

The building of the Official Association of Building Engineers and Technical Architects of Pontevedra is an early 20th century stately home in the city of Pontevedra, Spain.

== Location ==
The building is located at number 23, Enfesta de San Telmo street, in the old town of Pontevedra, with facades overlooking the Muelle square and Barón street. It is located opposite the Palace of the Counts of Maceda, currently the Pontevedra Tourism Parador.

== History ==
There are references to a building in this place since the 15th century. A map of the city dating from 1856, drawn up by the cartographer and Lieutenant-Colonel of Engineers Francisco Coello de Portugal y Quesada, already mentions the existence of a building in this place. The house belonged to the businessman and philanthropist Casimiro Gómez Cobas. In 1931, a floor was added to the existing one, but it was not until the mid-1950s that, according to the project of the architect Juan Argenti Navajas, an additional floor was added with an attic under the roof, which shaped its current structure.

In 2002, the Official Association of Quantity Surveyors and Technical Architects of Pontevedra bought the building and entrusted its restoration to the architect Celestino García Braña. Work began in March 2004 and the building was inaugurated on 25 May 2005 as the headquarters of the Association of Technical Architects of the Province of Pontevedra, serving members of the Association throughout the province.

== Description ==
The building has an area of 1800 square metres, divided into a ground floor, two floors and an attic.

It is a free-standing stone building with a rectangular plan. The exterior façade has a large stone chimney on the right-hand side of the north façade and segmental arches on the first and second floor windows. On the Baron Street façade, the first floor has a balcony along the façade and the second floor a balcony in the centre and two galleries at each end. On the ground floor, the windows and doors are protected by weathering steel elements, which have a cut-out oak leaf pattern that brings light into the interior. On the roof, the tiled roof is finished on the sides of the south and north facades with prominent copper gargoyles.

Inside, the building is dominated by a 12-metre high blue inverted vault that crowns the building's stairwell, where the lights simulate a starry appearance. The staircase ends in an open space on the ground floor, where the two entrances meet. In the attic, a window opens onto the north façade, illuminating the interior diagonally. The floors are made of wood and exposed concrete and wood form the basis of the structure. The interior partitions are oil-painted and the stair railings are made of glass. The ground floor houses a showroom and customer service, the first floor offices and a library, the second floor a meeting room, training rooms and the office of the dean of the association, and the attic the archives.

== Gallery ==
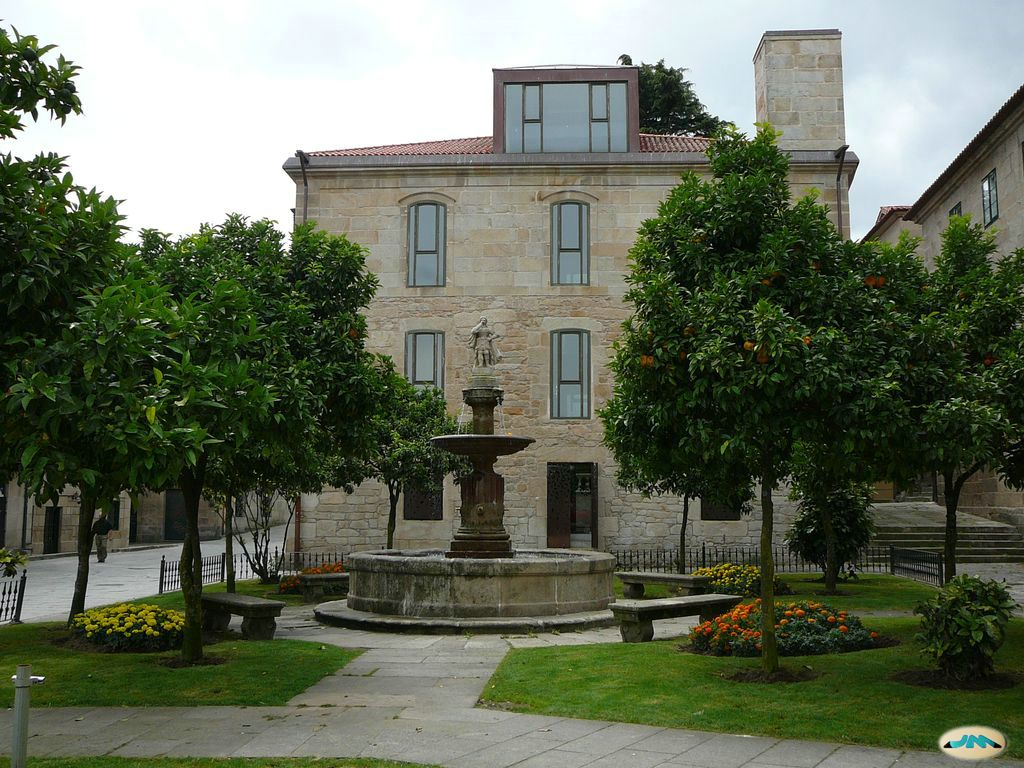
North side of the building

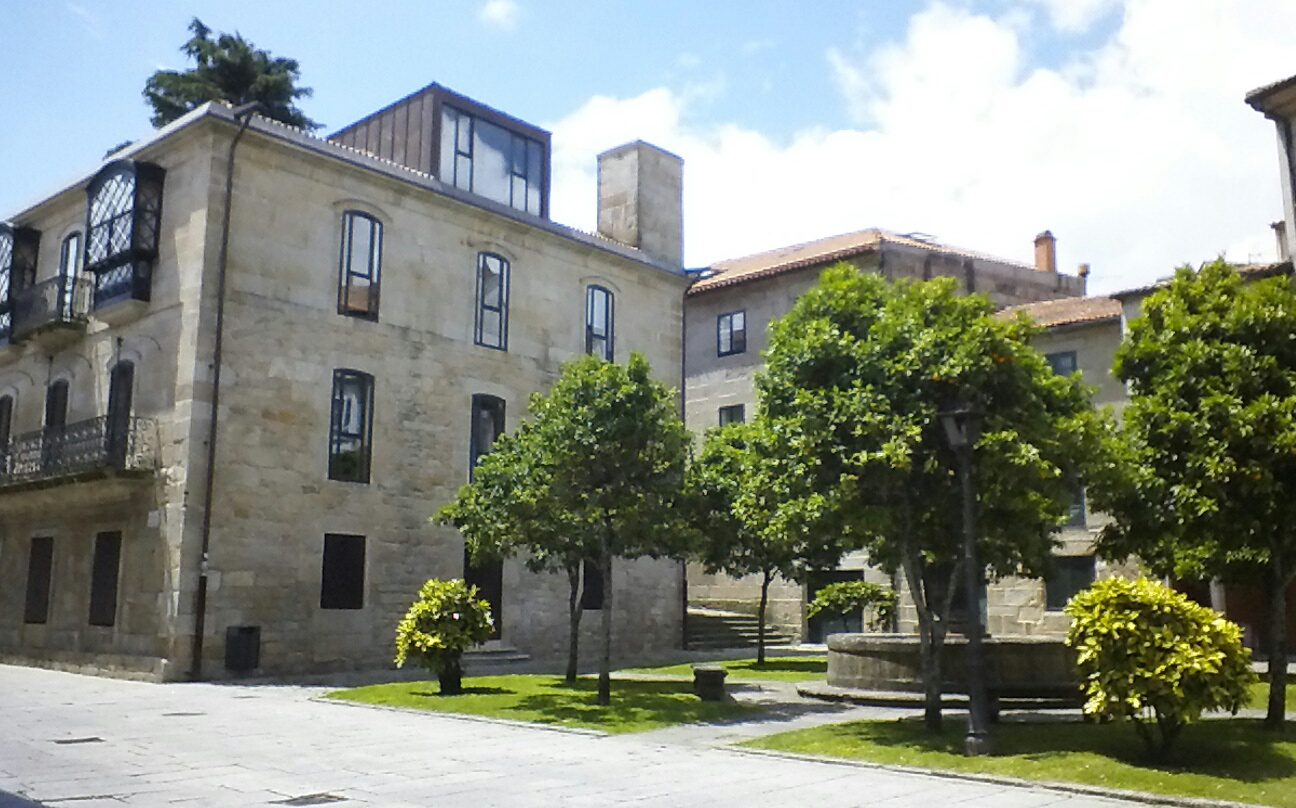
The building on the Muelle Square

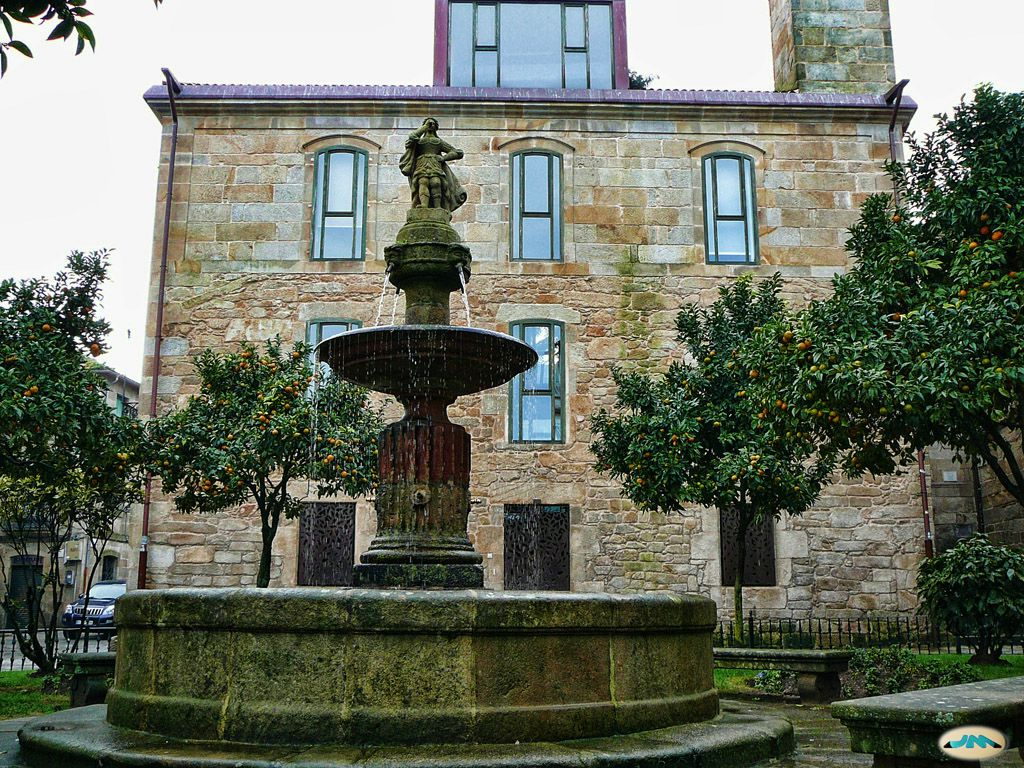
The building and the 1876 fountain designed by Alejandro Sesmero with the sculpture of the Roman goddess Fama

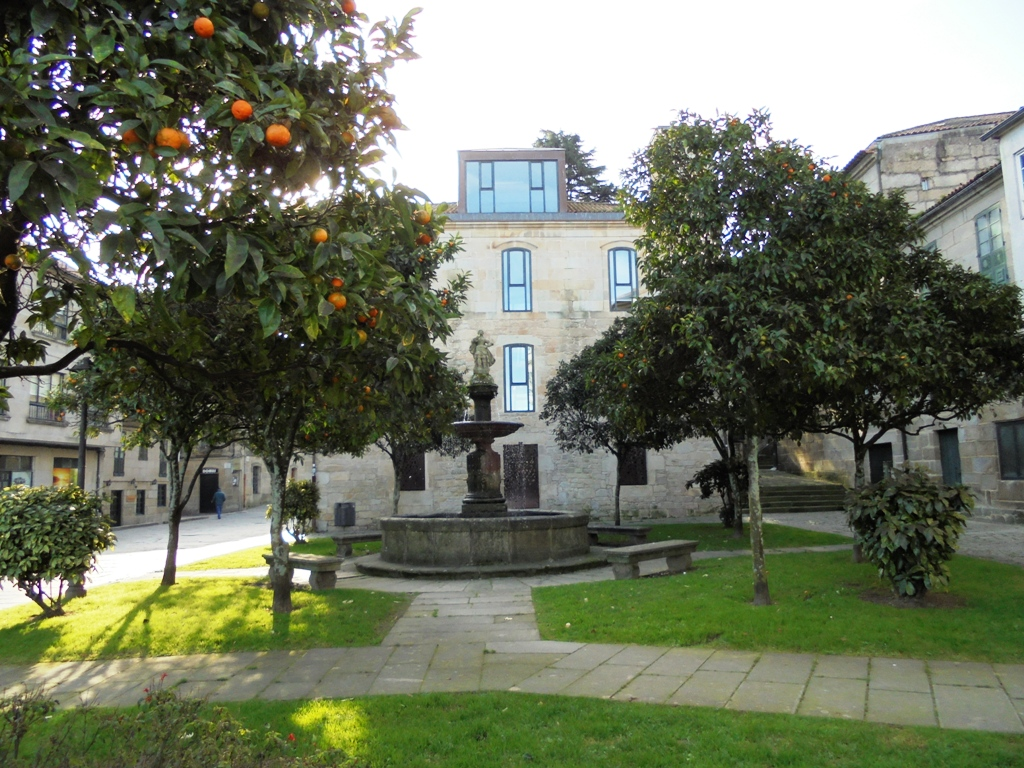
The building behind the orange trees in the square

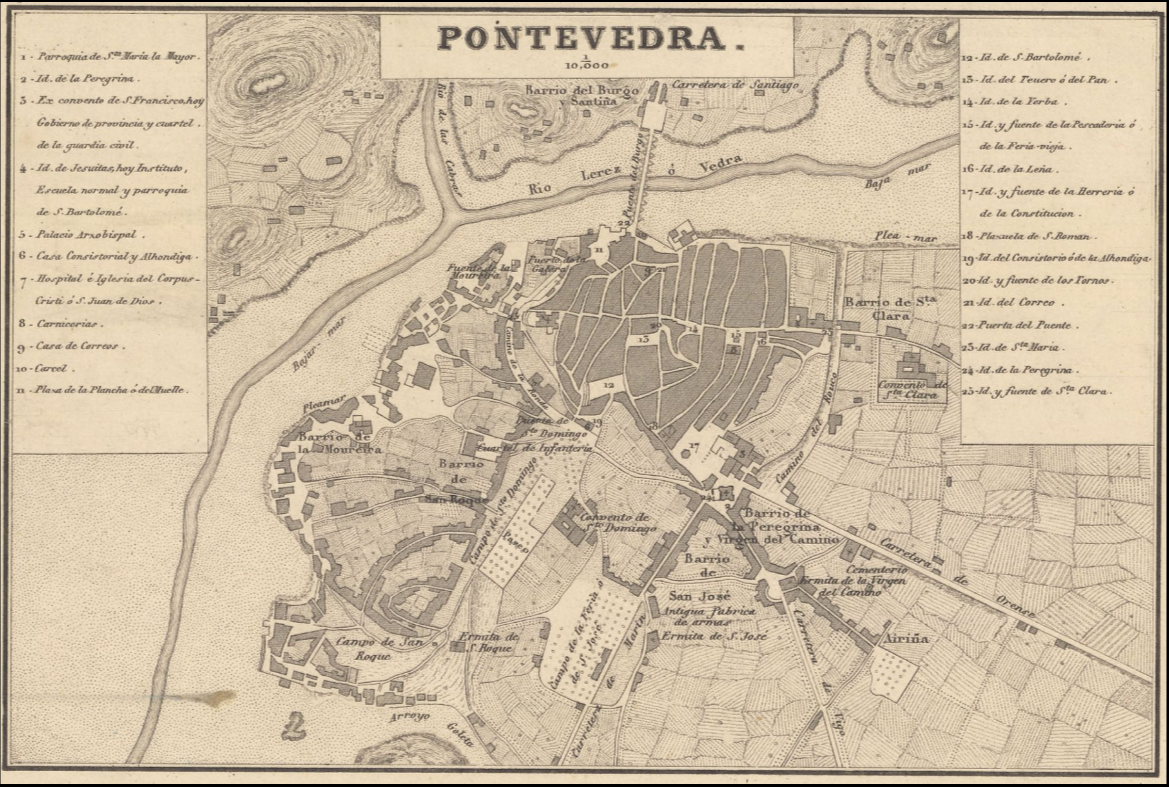
Plan of 1856 with the buildings of the Muelle Square or the Plancha at number 11

== See also ==
=== Bibliography ===
- (es) AA.VV., Sede del Colegio Oficial de Aparejadores y Arquitectos de Pontevedra. Pontevedra, COAAT, 2006.

=== Related articles ===
- Plaza del Muelle
- Old town of Pontevedra

=== External links ===
- Headquarters of the Official Association of Technical Architects of Pontevedra
