= Pazo of the Counts of Maceda =

Manor house in Pontevedra, Spain

Palace of the Counts of Maceda
- Pazo de los Condes de Maceda
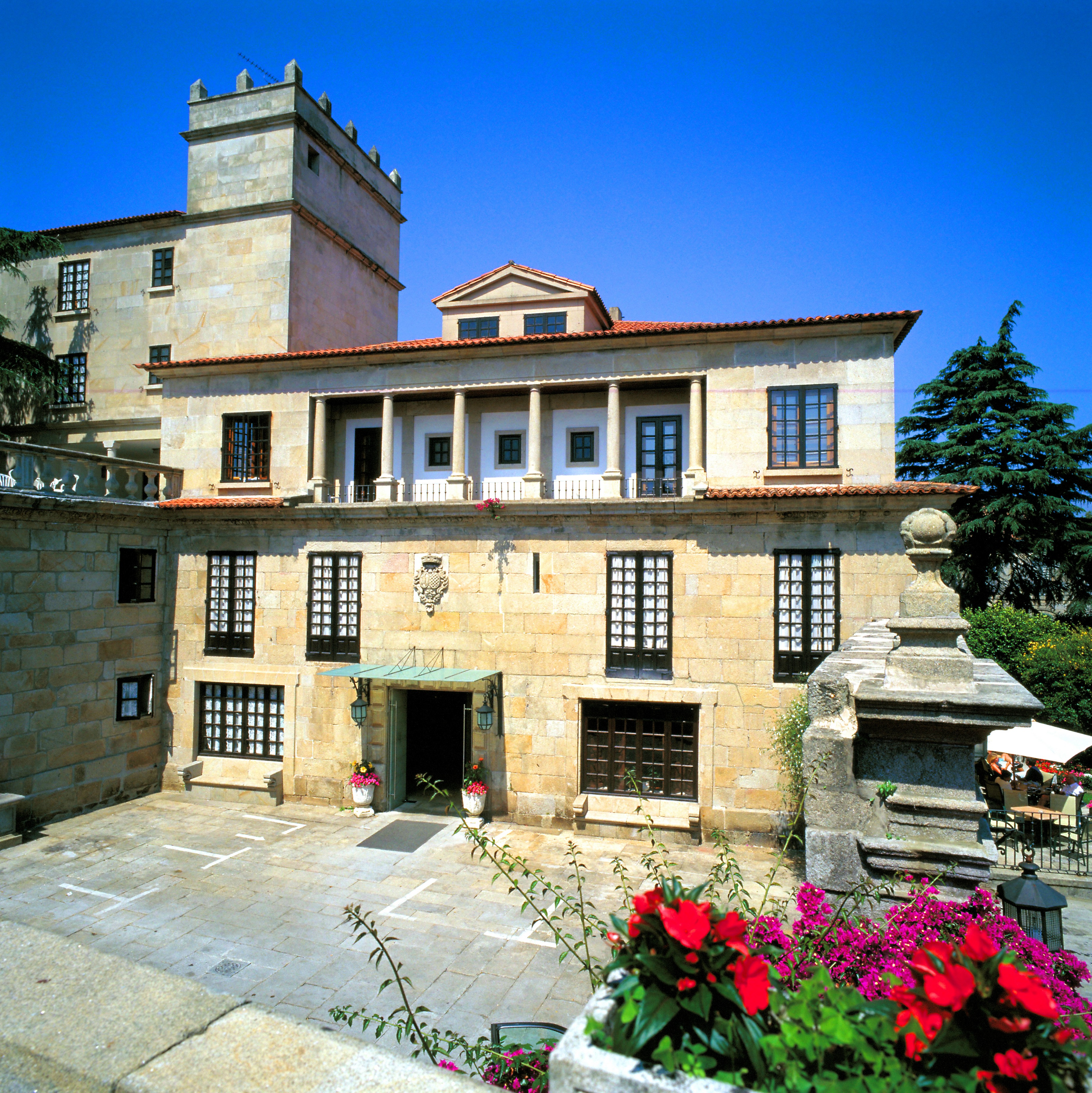
- Interactive map of the Palace of the Counts of Maceda area
- Alternative names: Parador de Pontevedra
- Hotel chain: Paradores

General information
- Type: Pazo
- Location: Pontevedra, Spain
- Coordinates: 42°26′03.1″N 8°38′45.9″W
- Construction started: 16th century
- Completed: 18th century
- Opening: 1955 (as a Parador)

Technical details
- Floor count: 4

Design and construction
- Architect: Pedro de Monteagudo (18th century)

Website
- Parador de Pontevedra

The Palace of the Counts of Maceda, or Casa del Barón in Pontevedra, Spain, is an original Renaissance pazo dating from the 16th century. It is currently a four-star hotel belonging to the Paradores network.

== Location ==
It is located in Barón street, in the heart of the old town of Pontevedra, close to the medieval Burgo Bridge.

== History ==
The building has its origin in a Roman villa. In the 16th century, the building was transformed into a Renaissance pazo. In the 18th century, the building was completely refurbished by the architect Pedro de Monteagudo and it became the property of the illustrious Counts of Maceda. Later, the property was passed on to the Marquis of Figueroa and Atalaya (also a count of Maceda) who filled it with antiques.

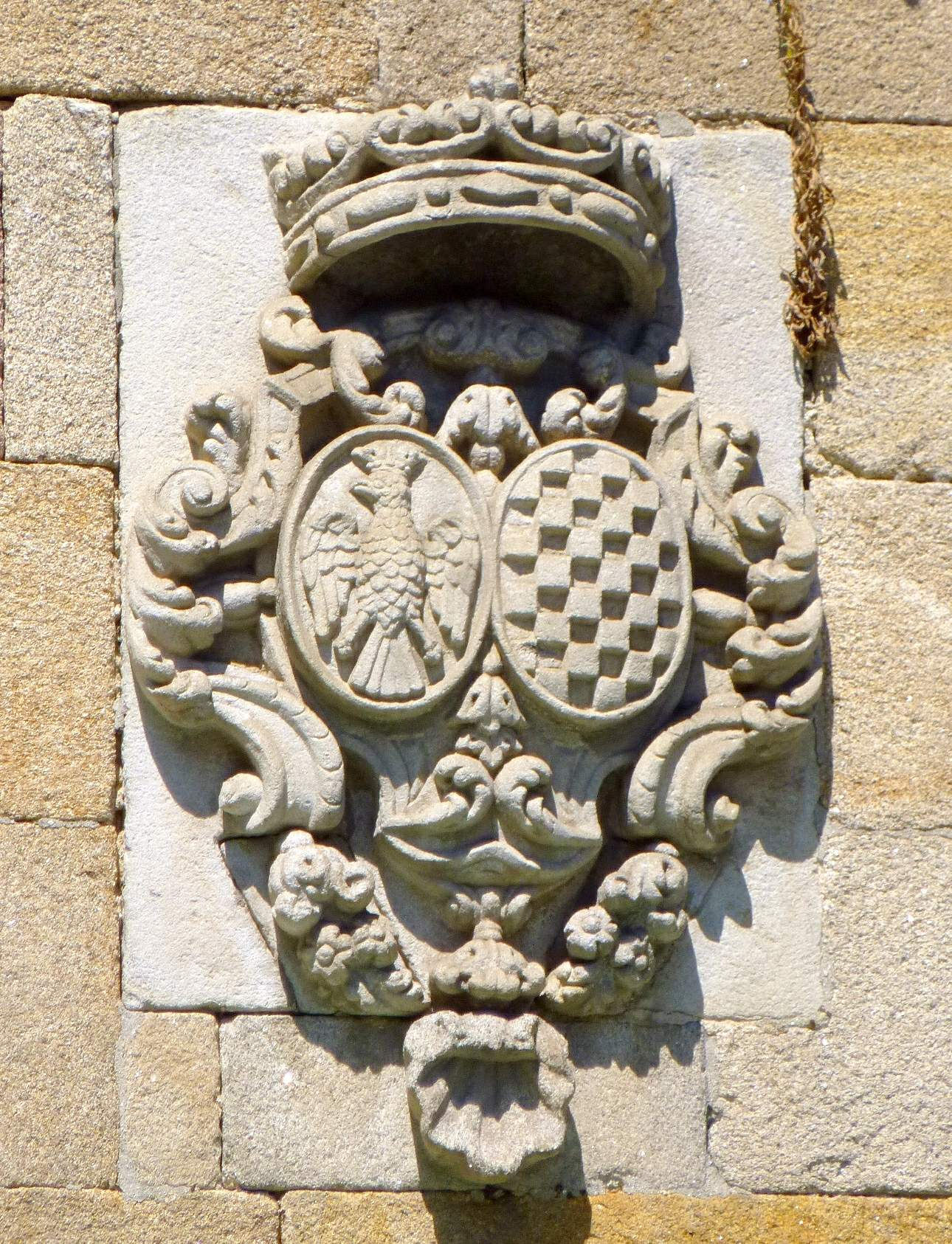
Coat of arms of the Palace

In the 19th century, the palace went into decline, and its uninhabited rooms were used as a sea salt warehouse and a school for poor children. It is even said that the building became a Masonic lodge. Later, it was transformed into a place where dozens of families lived. The Baron of Casa Goda, Eduardo de Vera y Navarro, put an end to this decadence, recovering its possessions and restoring much of its former splendour. This is why the Parador de Turismo de Pontevedra is called Casa del Barón.

In the 20th century, the first floor of the palace became the headquarters of the Graduada Álvarez Limeses School and the second floor was used as a house, being the family residence of the directors of this school until 1950, when the Pontevedra City Council became the owner.

The building was refurbished as a luxury hotel managed by the Spanish State, becoming on 15 January 1955 the first National Parador of Turism in Galicia. In 1974 the hotel underwent its first extension and in 2002 a major upgrade worth 2.34 million euros was carried out.

== Description ==
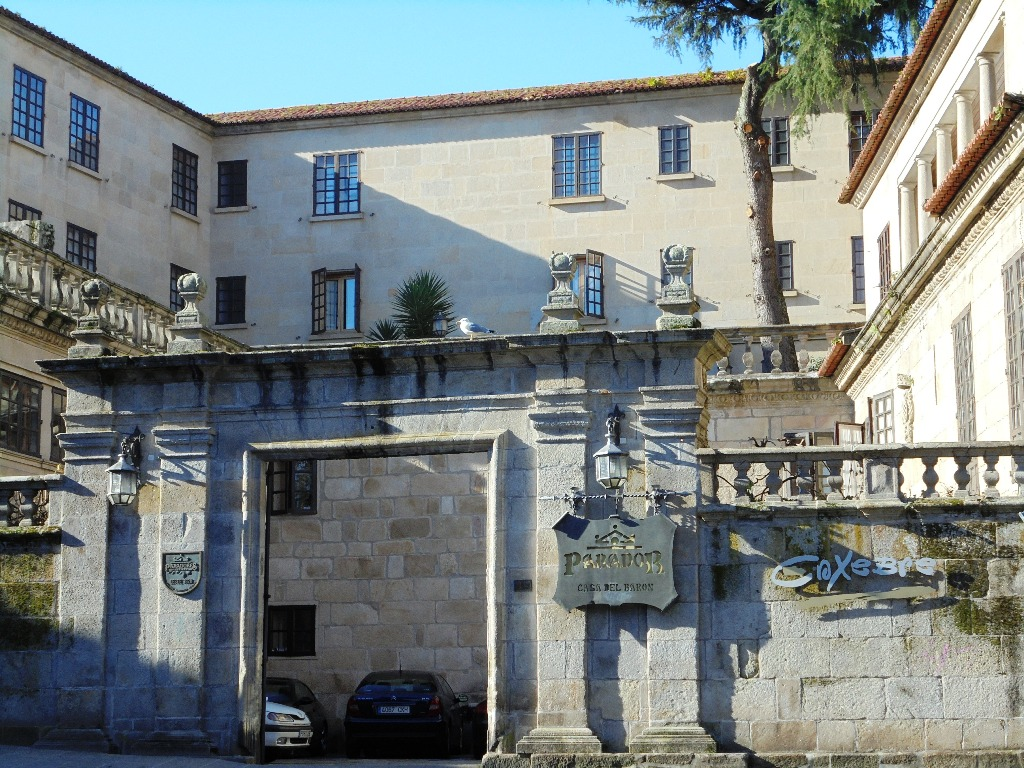
Portico

The pazo stands out for its imposing dimensions and stately ornamentation.

On the outside, there is a neoclassical portico at the entrance to the building. The façade of the building, covered with a frieze of oval shapes, is decorated with coats of arms and is topped by a colonnade of four granite columns. The palace has a crenellated tower added in the 18th century and a stone terrace. It also has a courtyard (originally designed for horses) and a garden.

Inside, there is large stone staircase, a Galician stone fireplace, and other baroque features. There are numerous drawing rooms. The building is decorated with antiques, tapestries, antique paintings, and classical and royal furniture.

== Hotel ==
The palace is now the Parador de Pontevedra, a 47-room luxury hotel. It is one of the four most popular paradors in Galicia. In 2019, its average annual occupancy rate was 72.75%, only behind the parador of Santiago de Compostela, the Hospital of the Catholic Monarchs.

King Felipe VI, the reigning king of Spain, used to spend the night here during his stay at the Spanish Naval Academy.

== Gallery ==
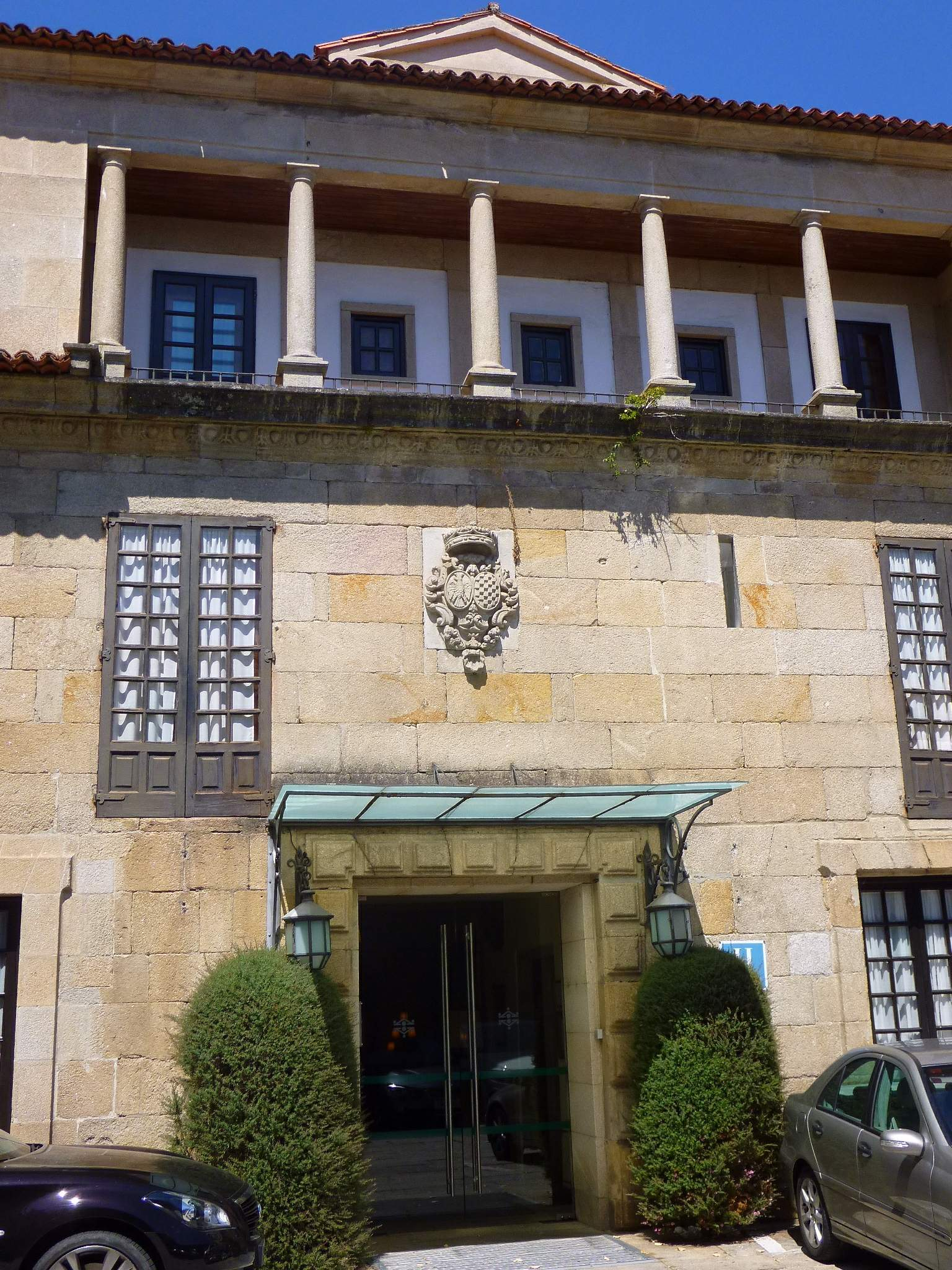
Façade

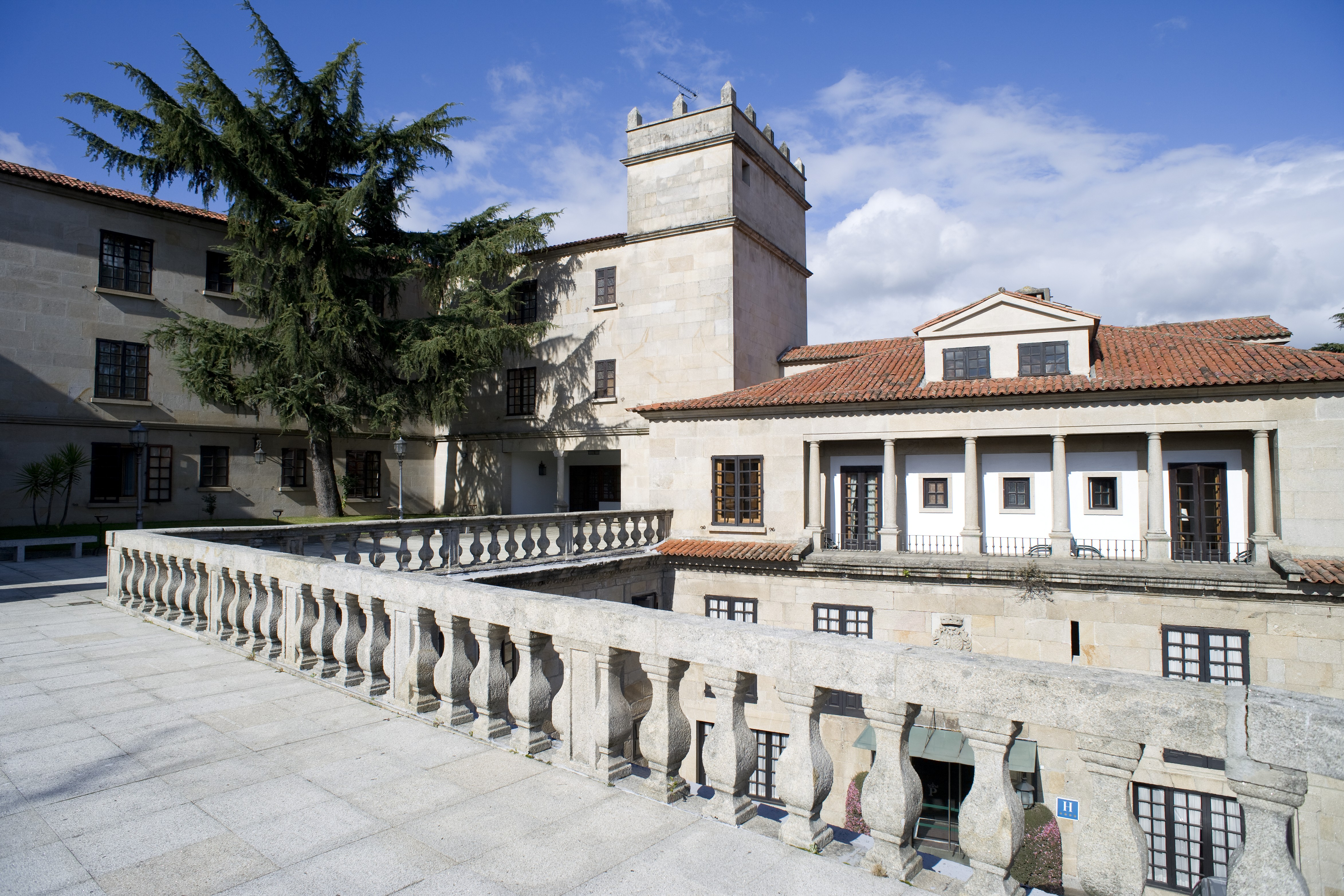
Main facade from the stone terrace of the building

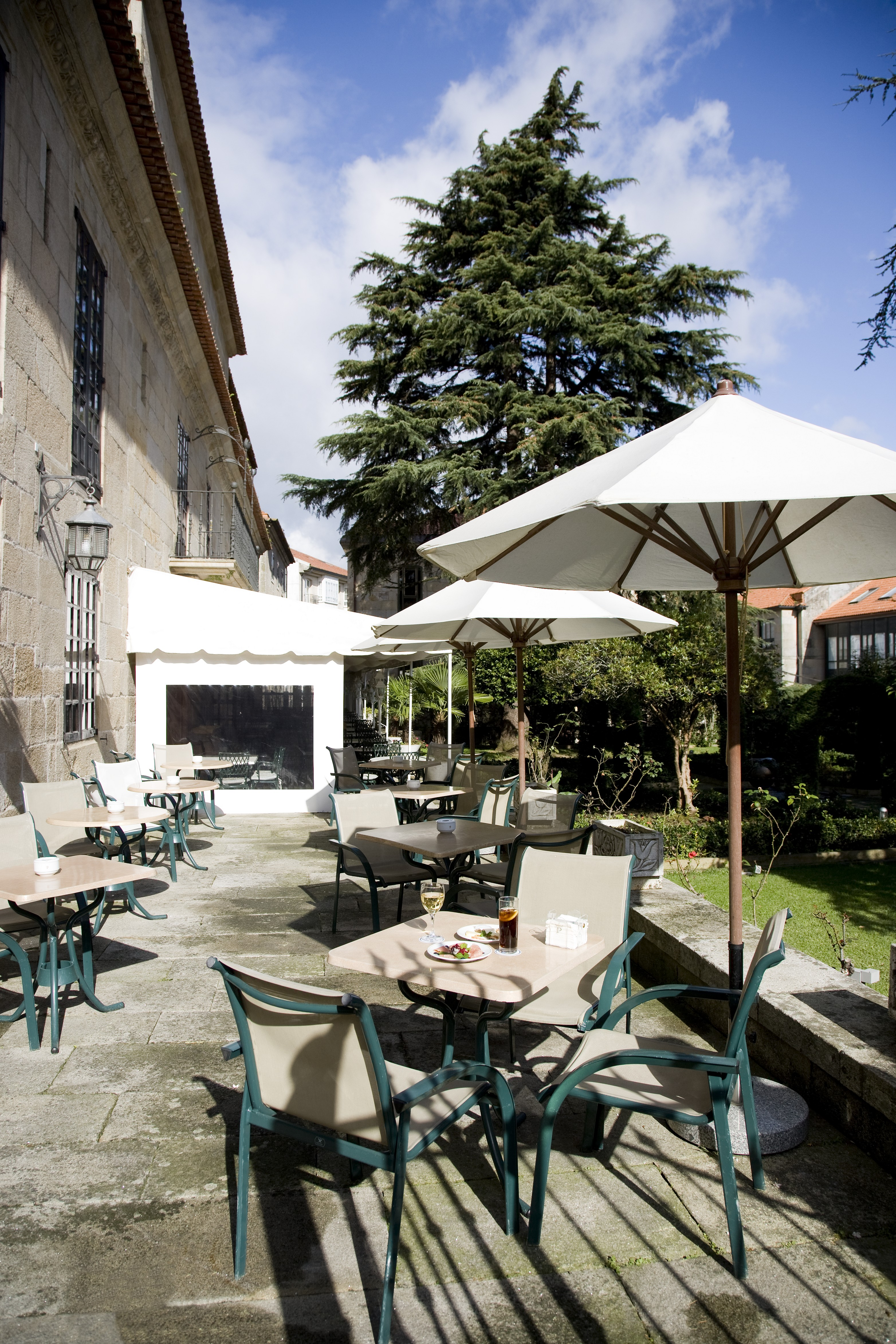
Partial view of the gardens

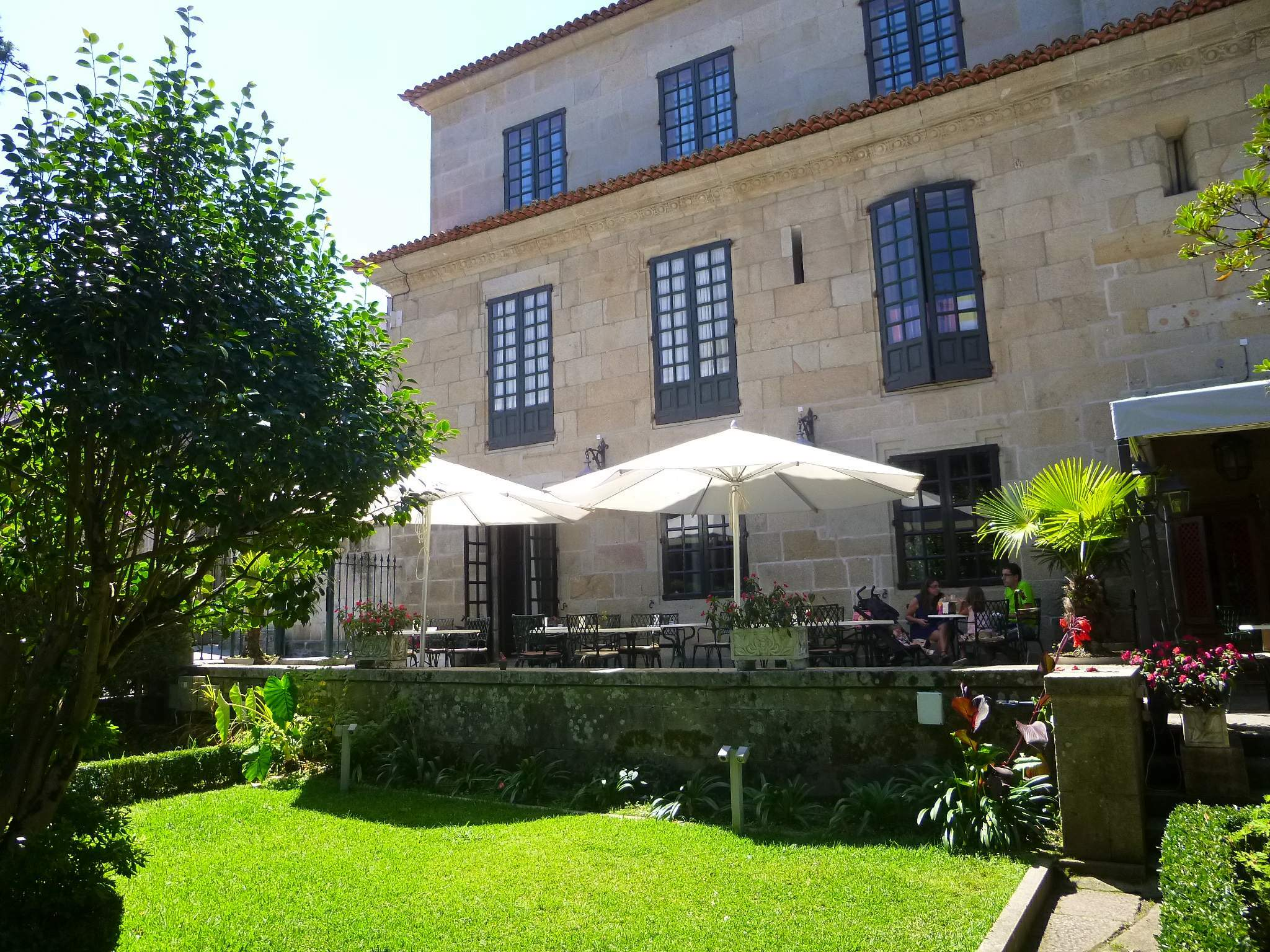
Gardens

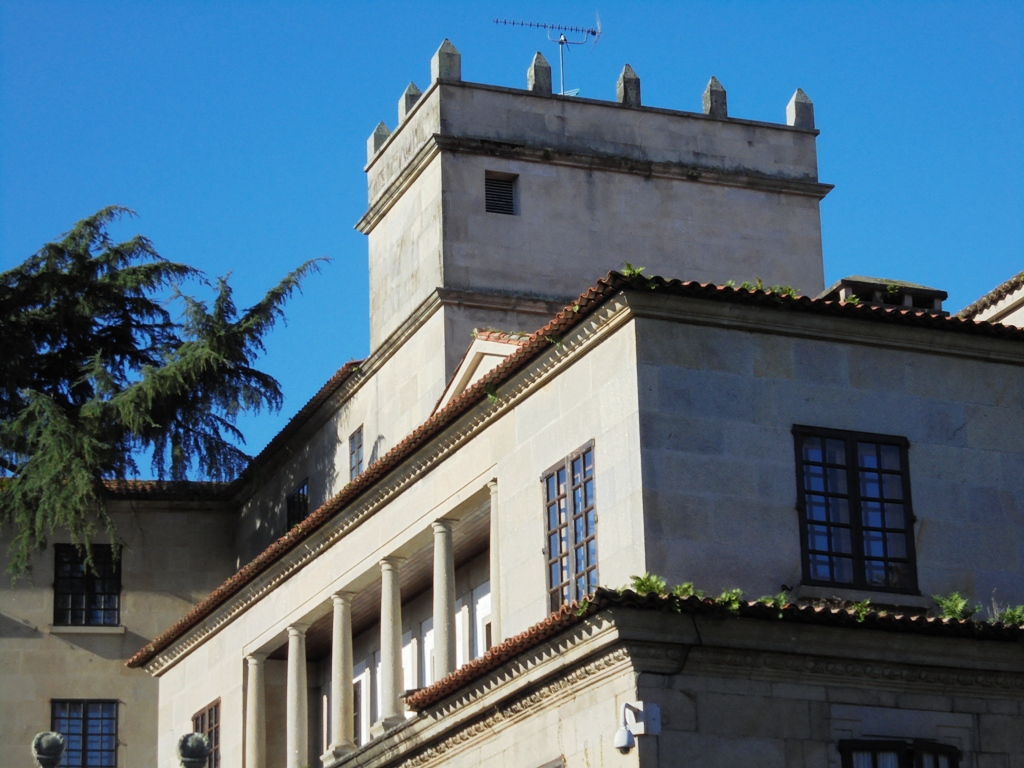
18th century crenellated tower

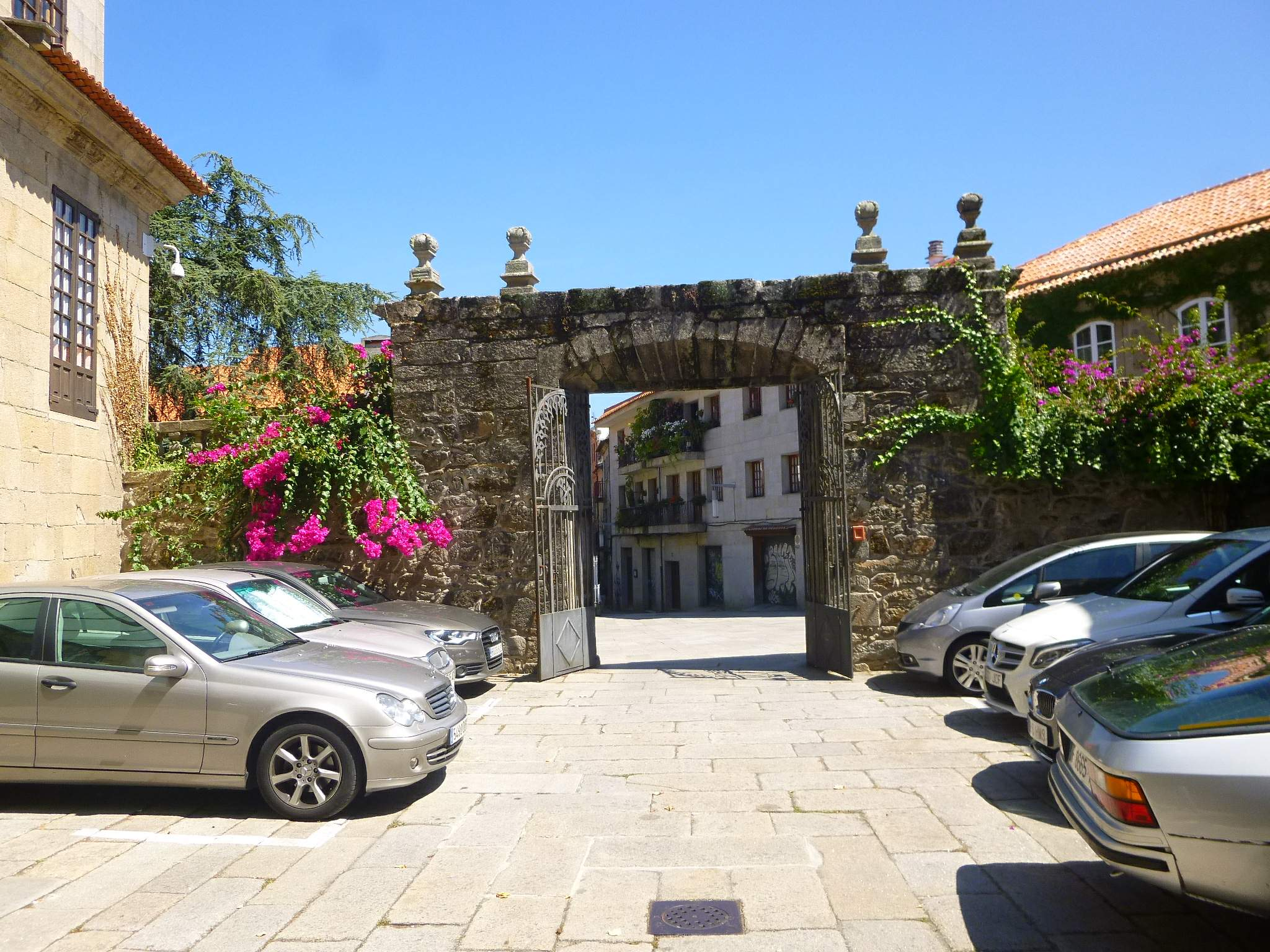
Courtyard and small car park

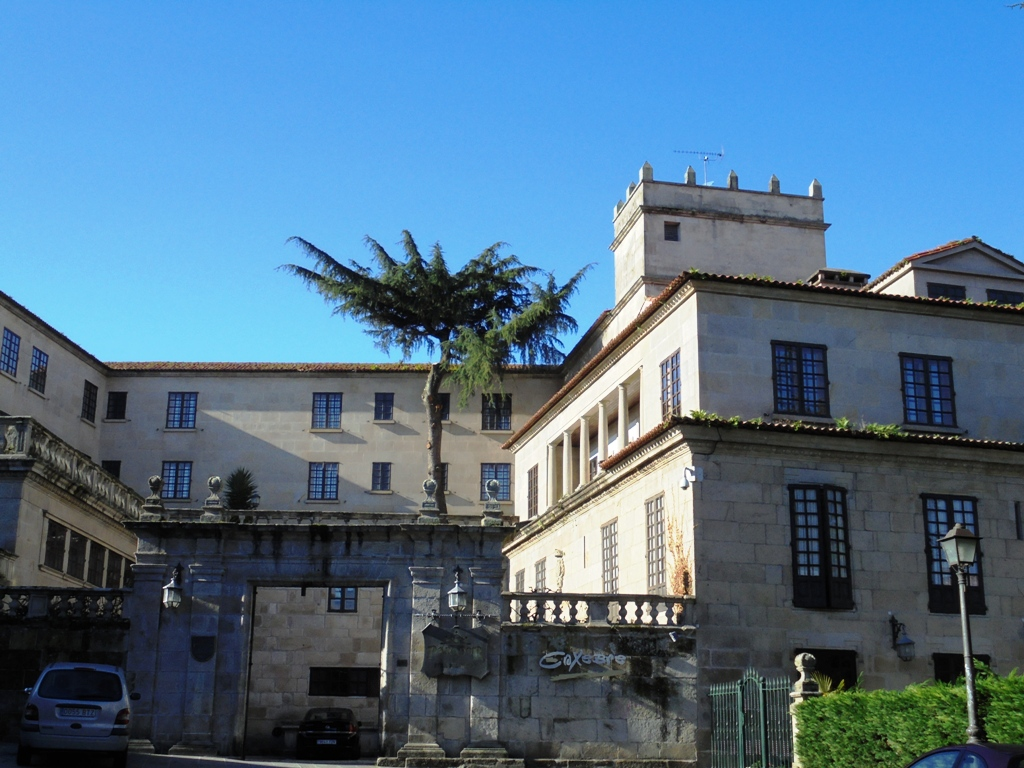
View of the entrance gate

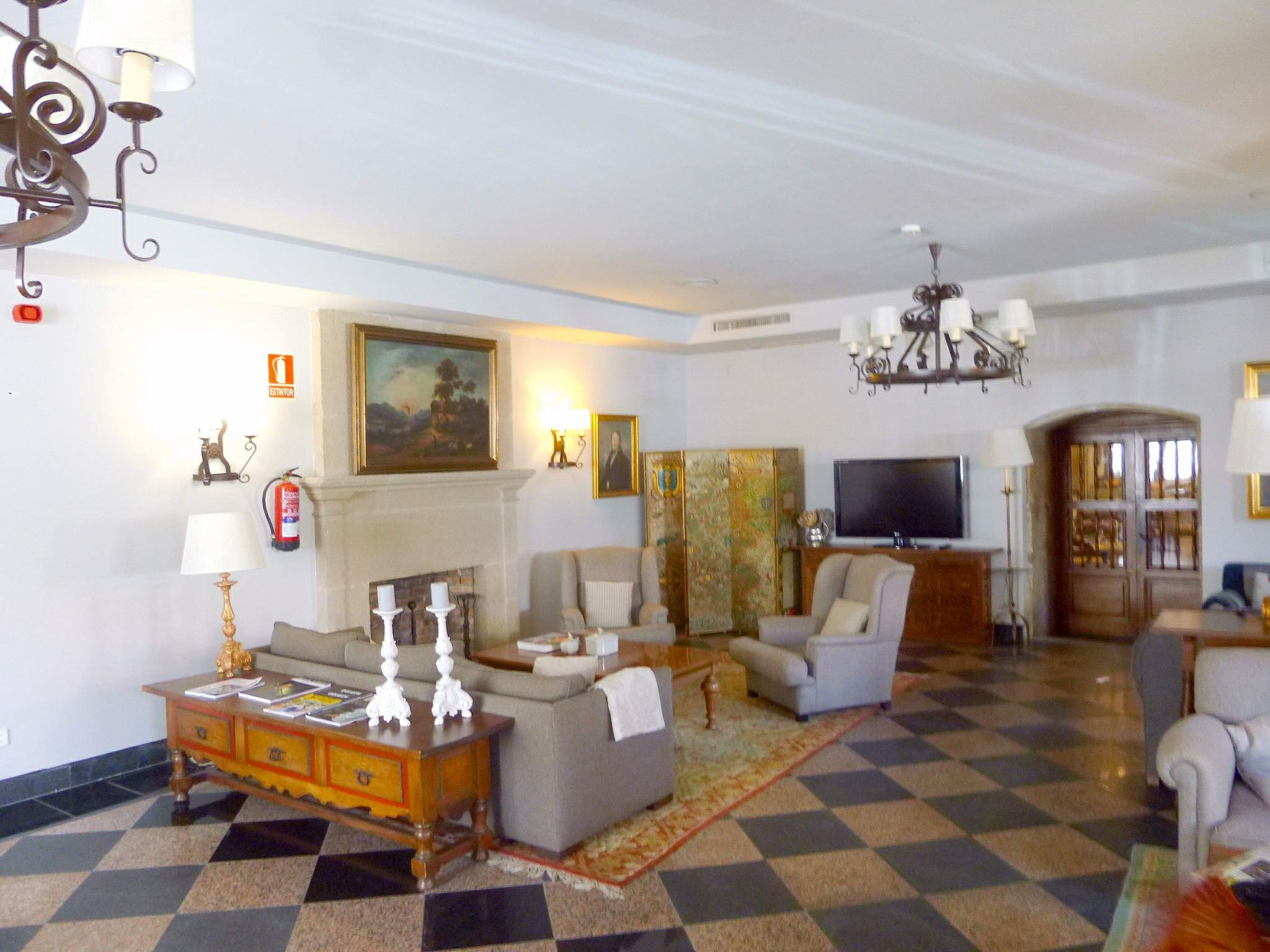
Interior

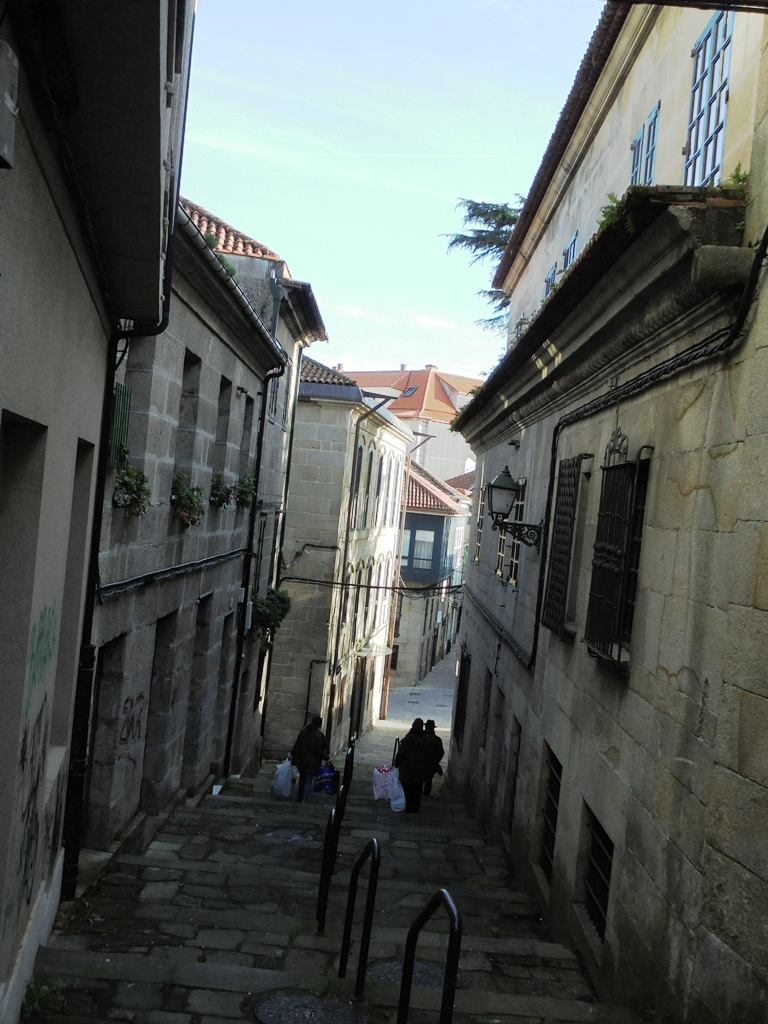
Side of the Pazo Casa del Barón

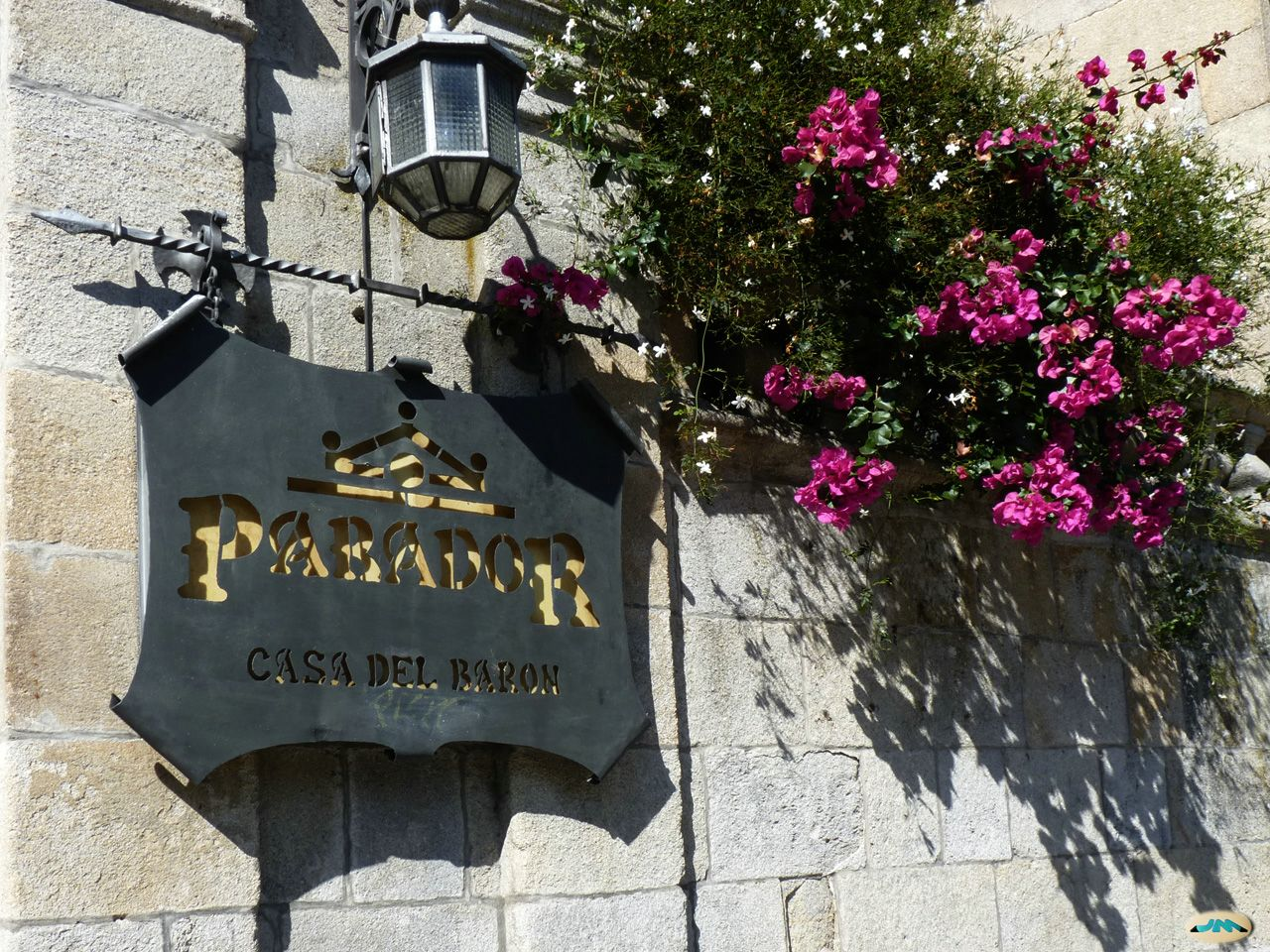
Parador plate

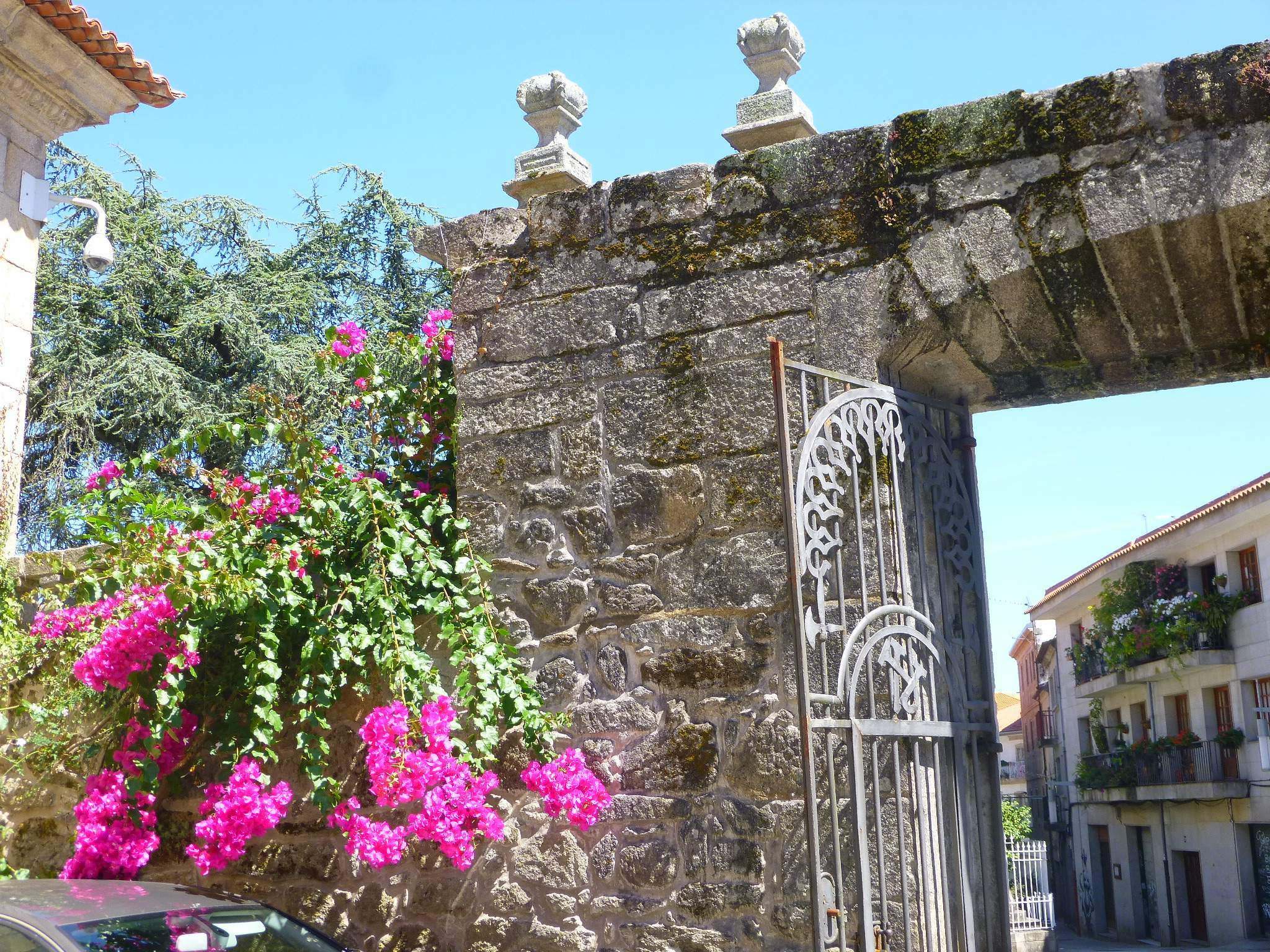
Portico from the inside

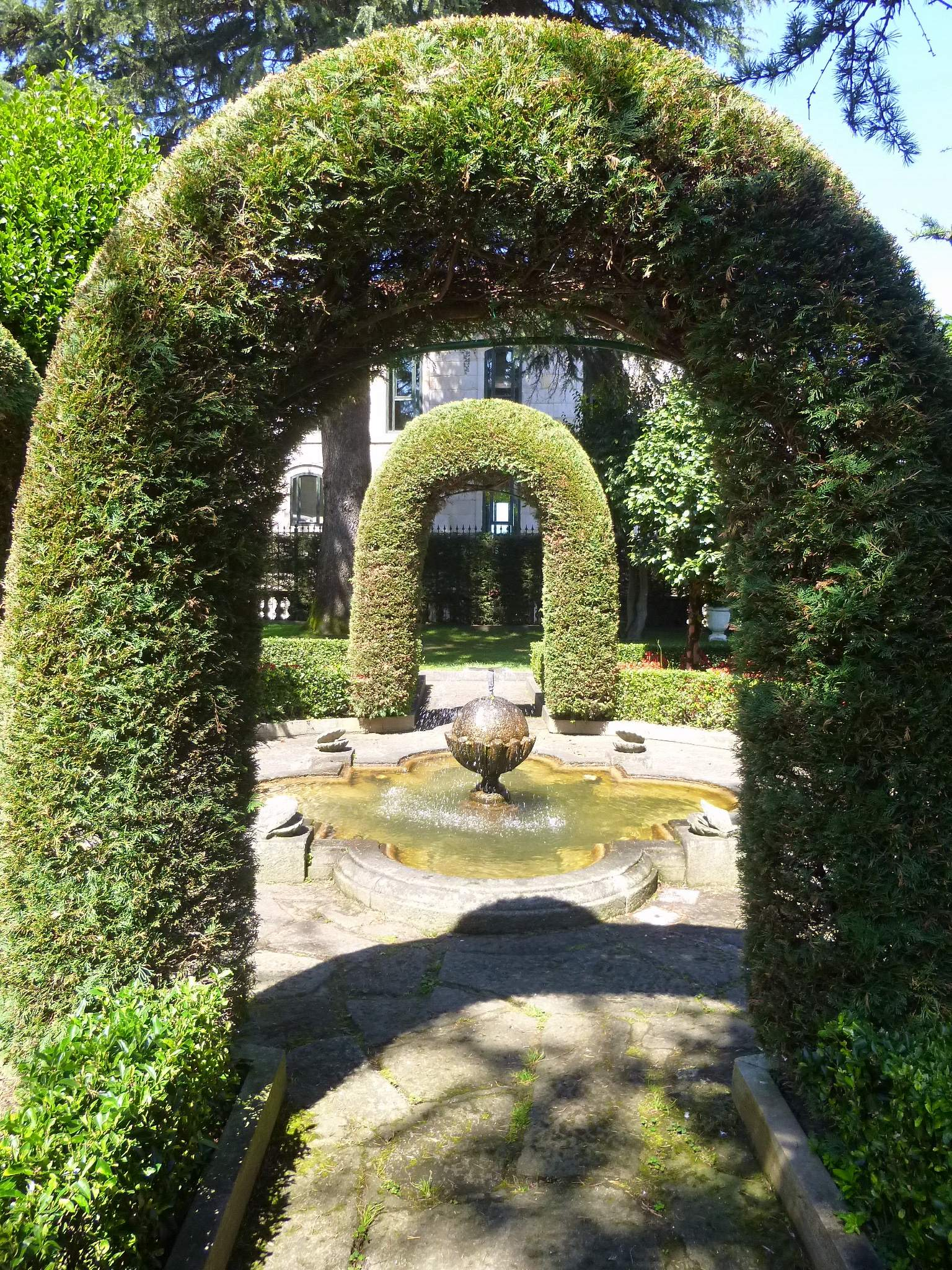
Parador gardens

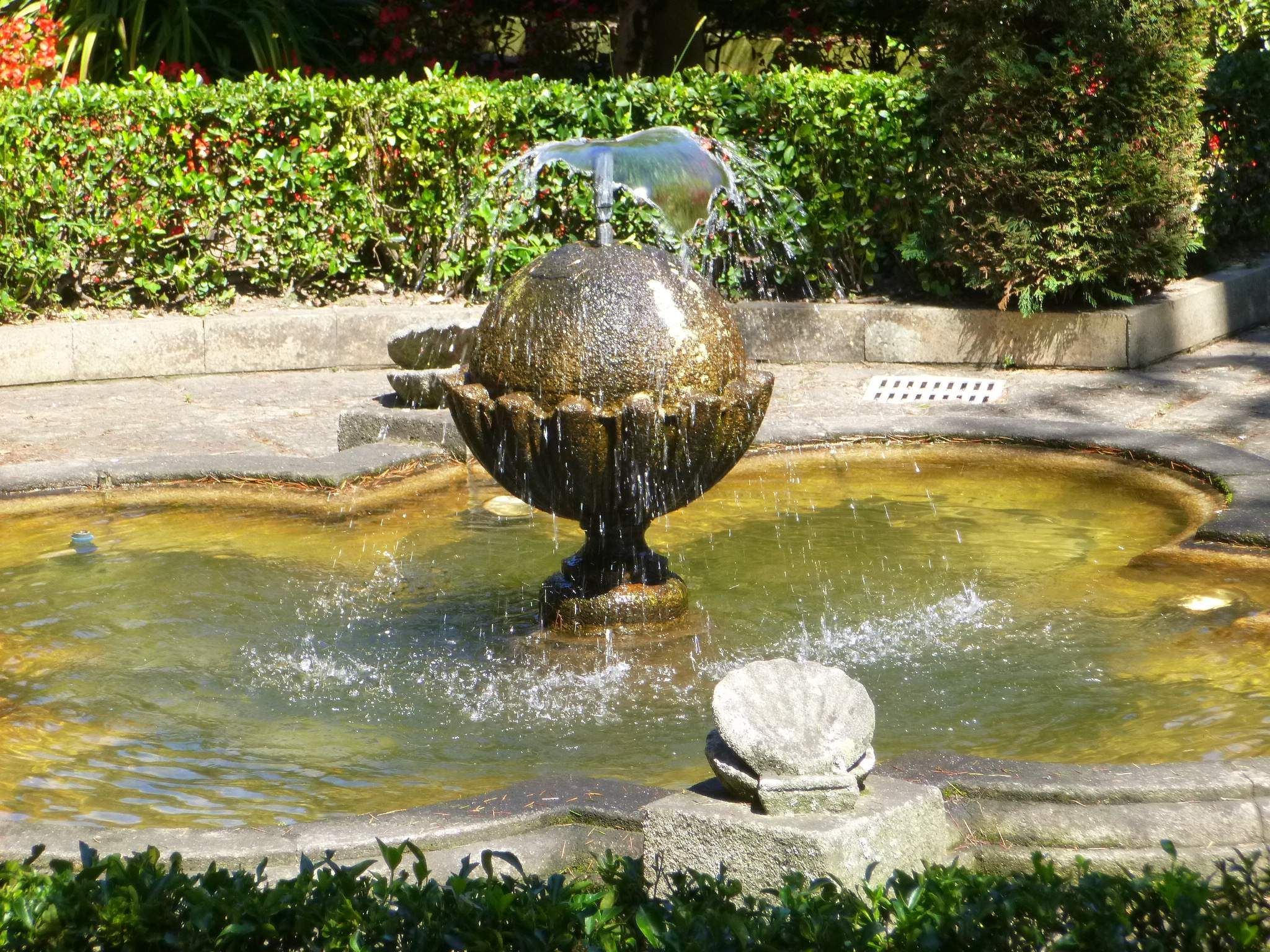
Pond

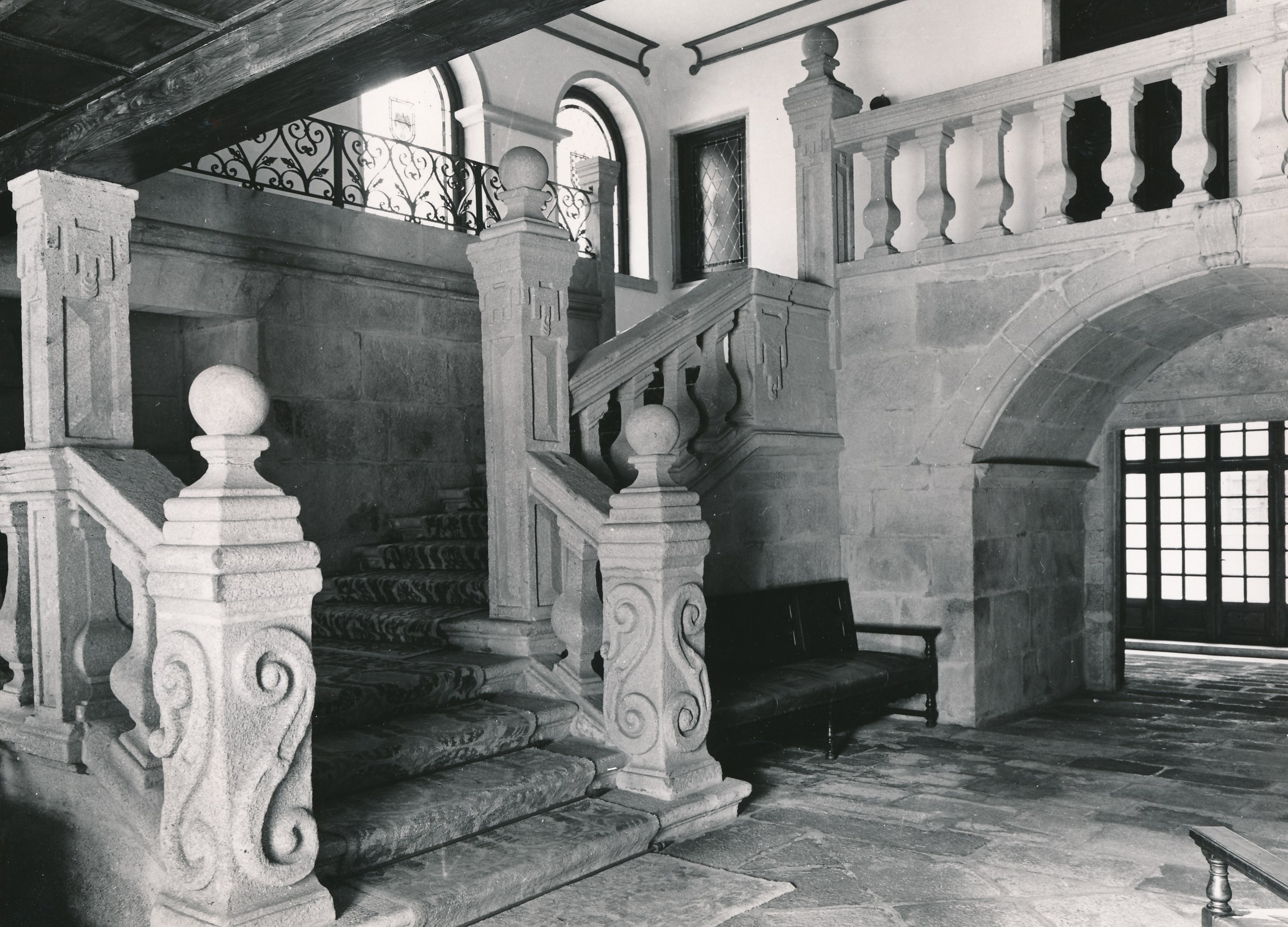
Internal staircase

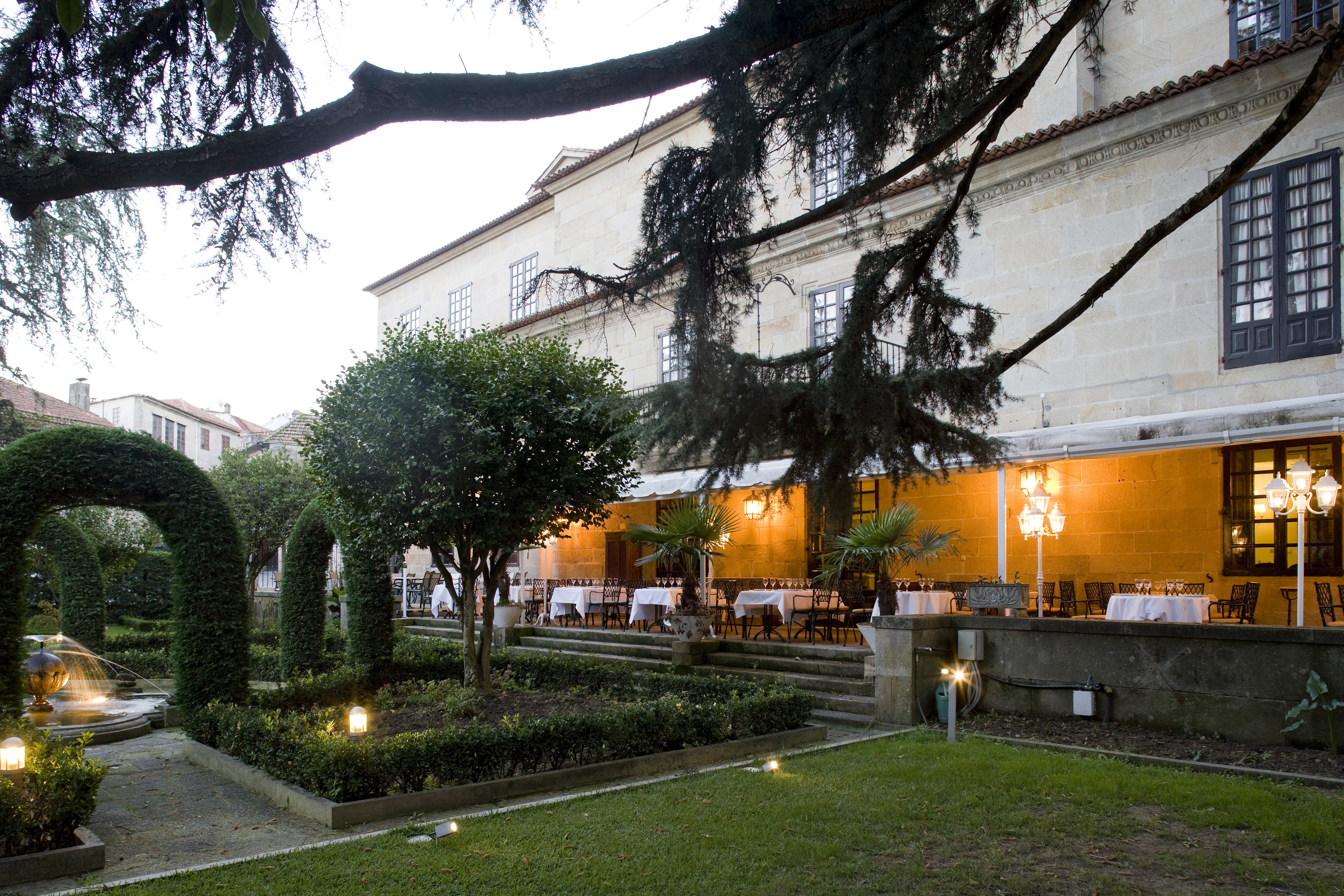
Gardens

== See also ==
=== Bibliography ===
- Aganzo, Carlos (2010). Pontevedra. Ciudades con encanto (in Spanish). Madrid: El País-Aguilar. pp. 81–82. ISBN 978-8403509344.
- Fontoira Surís, Rafael (2009). Pontevedra monumental (in Spanish). Pontevedra: Diputación Provincial de Pontevedra. p. 291. ISBN 978-84-8457-327-2.
- Riveiro Tobío, Elvira (2008). Descubrir Pontevedra (in Spanish). Pontevedra: Edicións do Cumio. p. 25. ISBN 9788482890852.

=== Related articles ===
- Building of the Official Association of Building Engineers and Technical Architects of Pontevedra

=== External links ===
- Casa del Barón
- Spain Paradors – Casa del Barón
