= Plaza del Muelle =

Medieval square in Pontevedra, Spain

Quay square
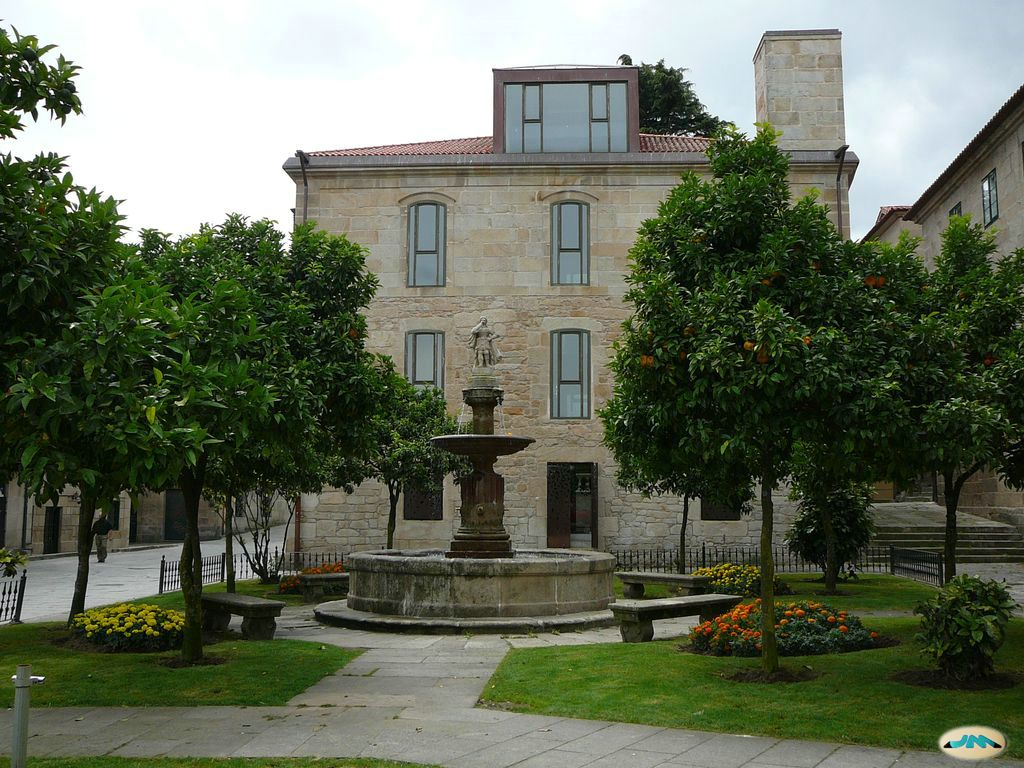
- The square with its 19th century fountain
- Native name: Plaza del Muelle (Spanish)
- Type: plaza
- Maintained by: Pontevedra City Council
- Location: Pontevedra, Spain
- Postal code: 36002
- Coordinates: 42.434833°N 8.645778°W

The Plaza del Muelle or Praza do Peirao ("Quay Square") is a square of medieval origin located at the northern edge of the historic centre of Pontevedra (Spain), very close to the Burgo Bridge and the old port neighbourhood A Moureira.

== Origin of the name ==
The square owes its name to its location in the space occupied, five centuries ago, by one of the most important quays of the city before the successive fillings, when the sea still reached this place at the bottom of the Lérez river.

== History ==
The space occupied by the square was the centre of the town's port activity in the 15th and 16th centuries and was known as Plancha (Plank). The name was derived from the fact that a plank held up by wooden pillars reached the quay and was used for landing ships. This square had the condition of an urban shoreline as an immediate and external space of the walled town when the city was the main port of Galicia. Some of its first fences ended in the old Cans street. In the 16th century, there was a salt warehouse to the west of the square where salt was stored for salting fish unloaded at the port. Also at this time, there was a wicket gate in the medieval walls at the junction of the current Valentín García Escudero Square with Arzobispo Malvar Street and the Quay Square, which, near the Lérez river, served as a link between the medieval city and the docks of that time. The walls reached down to the river, protecting the quays.

In the 19th century, there were still quays and piers here. In 1848, ships were still arriving and unloading in the square known as the Plaza de la Plancha, and there were also still the salt warehouses where shipments of salt entered and left to be consumed in Pontevedra and its surroundings and in the province of Ourense. In 1856, the square was still irregularly shaped and was called Plank Square or Quay Square.

In 1876, the municipal architect Alejandro Sesmero proposed to carry out "improvements to the ornamentation and alignments of the Quay Square and the location of a new fountain". With these improvements, the square was presided over by a neoclassical stone fountain crowned in 1950 by the statue of the Roman goddess Fama from the old fountain in the Herrería Square.

In 1931, a floor was added to an existing one for the current Building of the Official Association of Building Engineers and Technical Architects of Pontevedra, to the south of the square, but it was not until the mid-50s of the 20th century that, according to the project of the architect Juan Argenti Navajas, an additional floor was added with an attic under the roof, which configured its current structure.

In 1993, a stone monolith was installed in the square with an inscription recalling that the caravel Santa María was built on the docks in Pontevedra.

== Description ==
It is a very irregular rectangular square bordered on the east by Valentín García Escudero Square and where Barón and Arzobispo Malvar streets converge. It is paved and pedestrianised, like the rest of the historic centre of the city.

The square is dominated on the south side by the noble Building of the Official Association of Building Engineers and Technical Architects of Pontevedra (Colegio Oficial de Aparejadores y Arquitectos Técnicos de Pontevedra). The central part of the square is a landscaped area, with small paved paths between the lawns, which converge in the centre on a neoclassical fountain dating from 1876, topped by the statue of the Roman goddess Fama. The lower part of the fountain imitates a classical shaft, with a small basin and four mascarons.

In the northern part of the garden, there is a stone monolith with the following inscription: "More than half a millennium ago, the caravel Santa María "la Gallega" was built on this bank of the Lérez, where Admiral Christopher Columbus changed the fate of the world".

To the north of the square, at the end of Arzobispo Malvar Street, is the former birthplace of the intellectual and mayor of Pontevedra Xosé Filgueira Valverde. The remains of the house in which the poet, admiral and gentleman Paio Gómez Chariño lived are preserved on the site. He lies in the church of the Convent of Saint Francis.

== Outstanding buildings ==
On the south side of the square is the building of the Building of the Official Association of Building Engineers and Technical Architects of Pontevedra. It is a large detached stone house that took on its current appearance in the mid-20th century. It has a ground floor, two upper floors and an attic. The northern façade, which faces the square, has a large stone chimney on the right-hand side and segmental arches in the windows of the first and second floors. On the Baron Street façade, the first floor has a balcony along the façade and the second floor has a balcony in the centre and two galleries at each end. On the ground floor, the windows and doors are protected by weathering steel elements. On the roof, the tiled roof is finished on the sides of the south and north facades with prominent copper gargoyles

At the end of Arzobispo Malvar Street, on the north side of the square, is the old house where Xosé Filgueira Valverde was born. It was once the house of the doctor and mayor of the city, Ángel Cobián Areal, and has undergone many transformations. It was rebuilt on the former Pazo of Admiral Paio Gómez Chariño, and hides the remains of a tower of the old medieval wall.

== Gallery ==
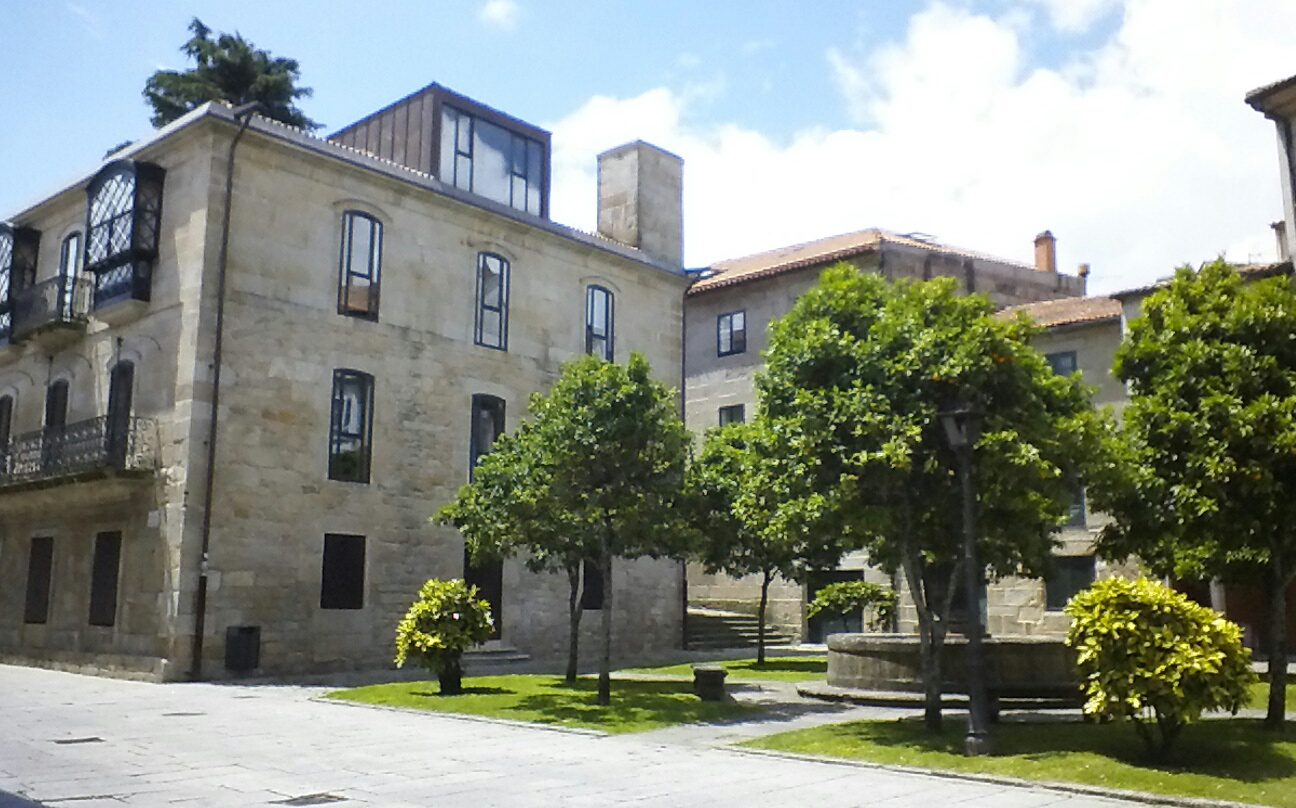
Quay Square

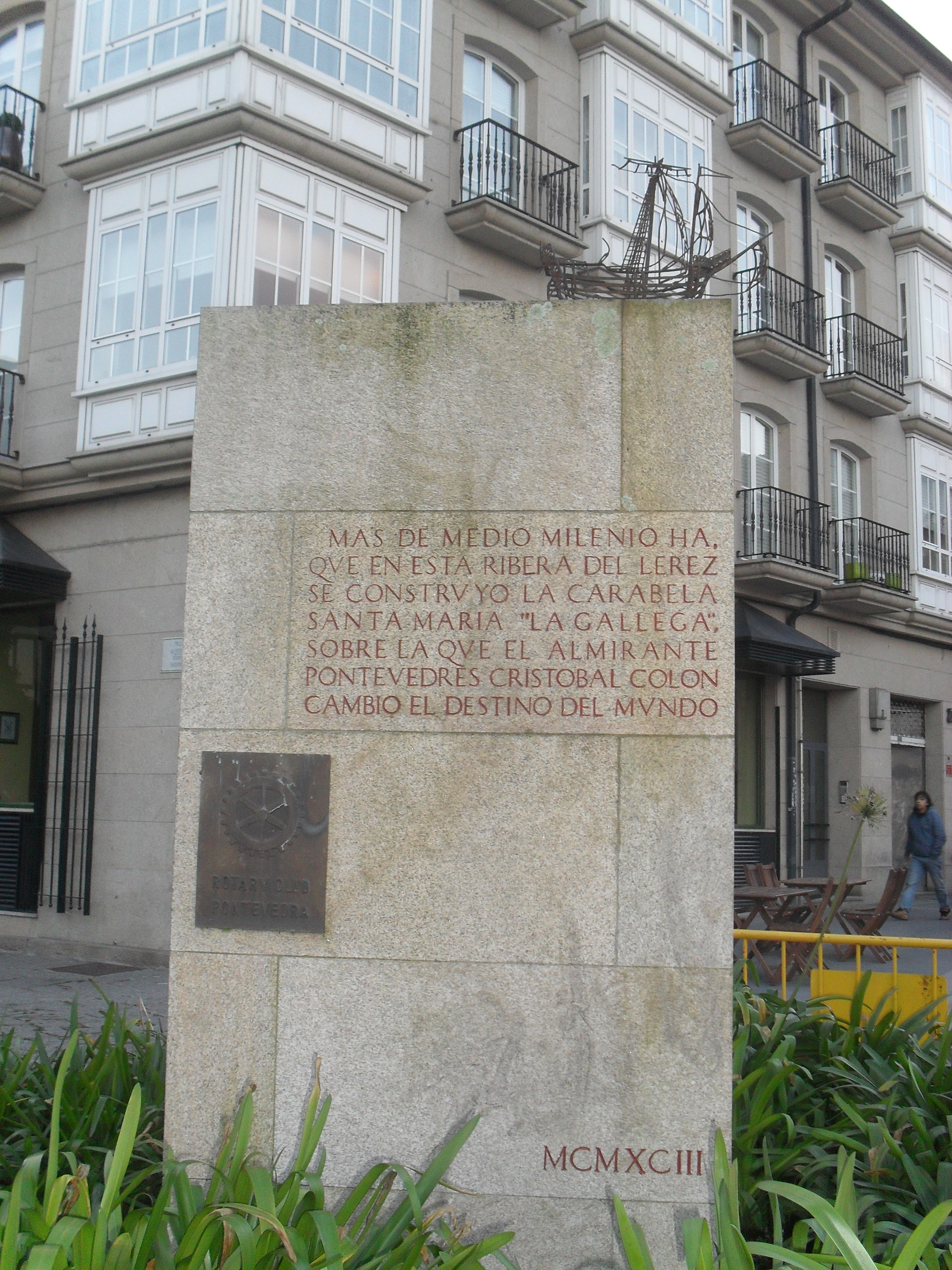
Monolith and monument to the construction of the caravel Santa María

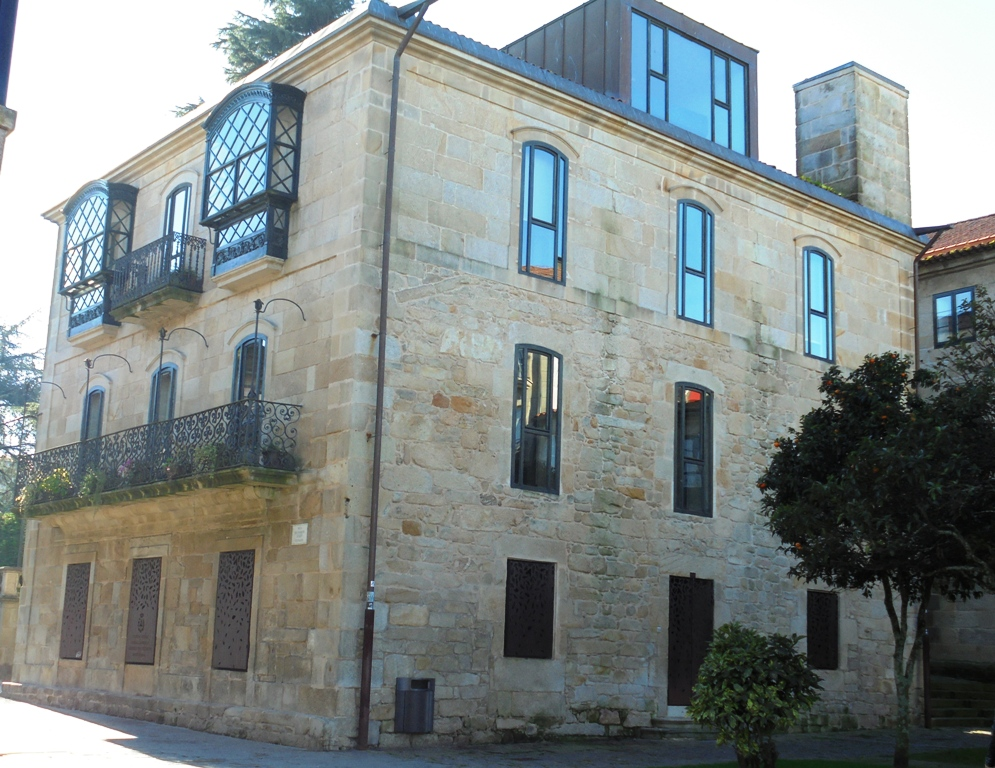
Building of the Official Association of Building Engineers and Technical Architects of Pontevedra

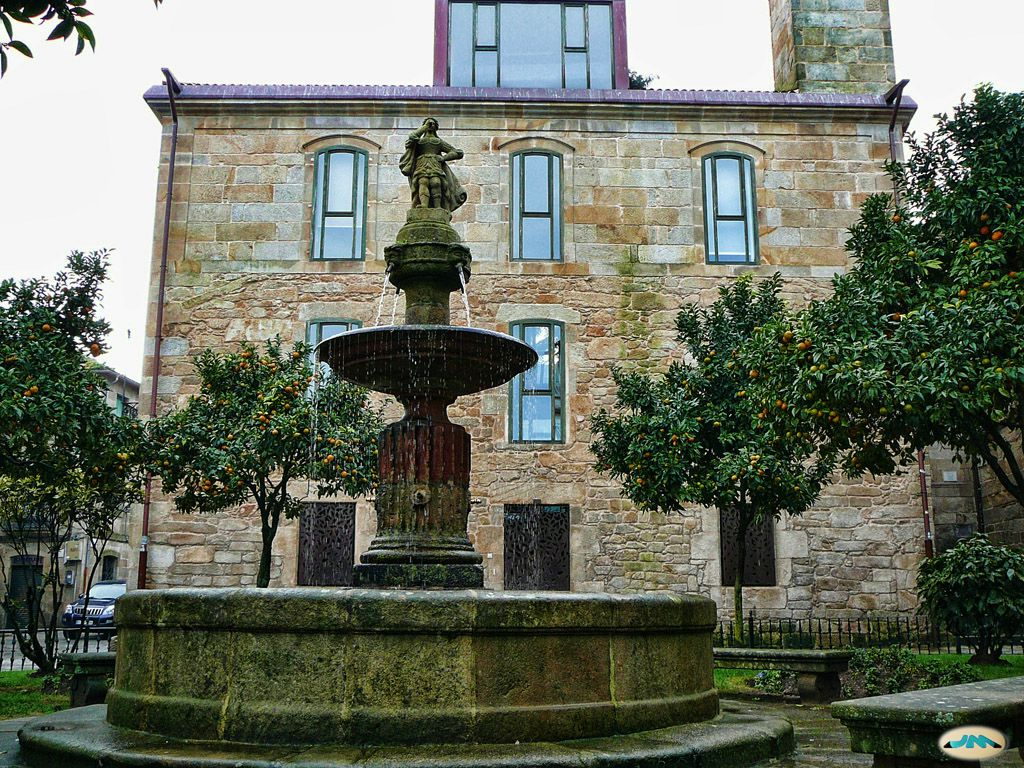
Neoclassical fountain from 1876 by Alejandro Sesmero

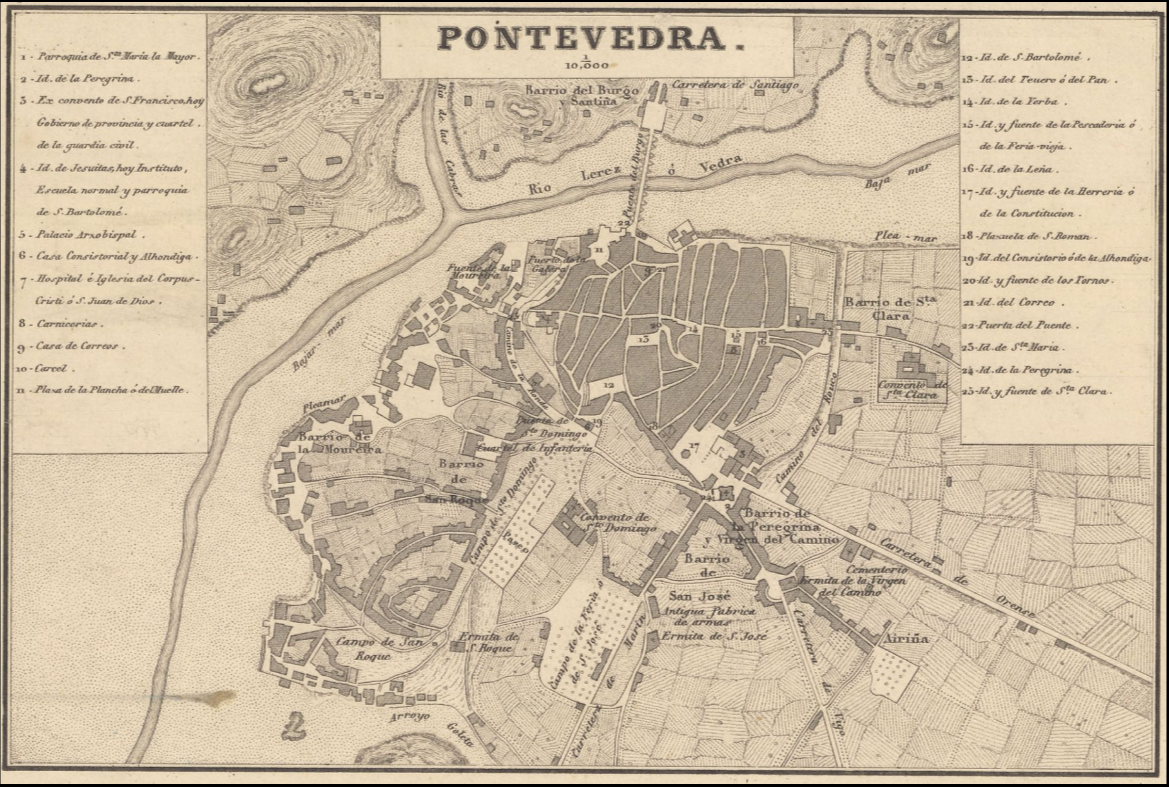
Map of 1856 with the square at number 11

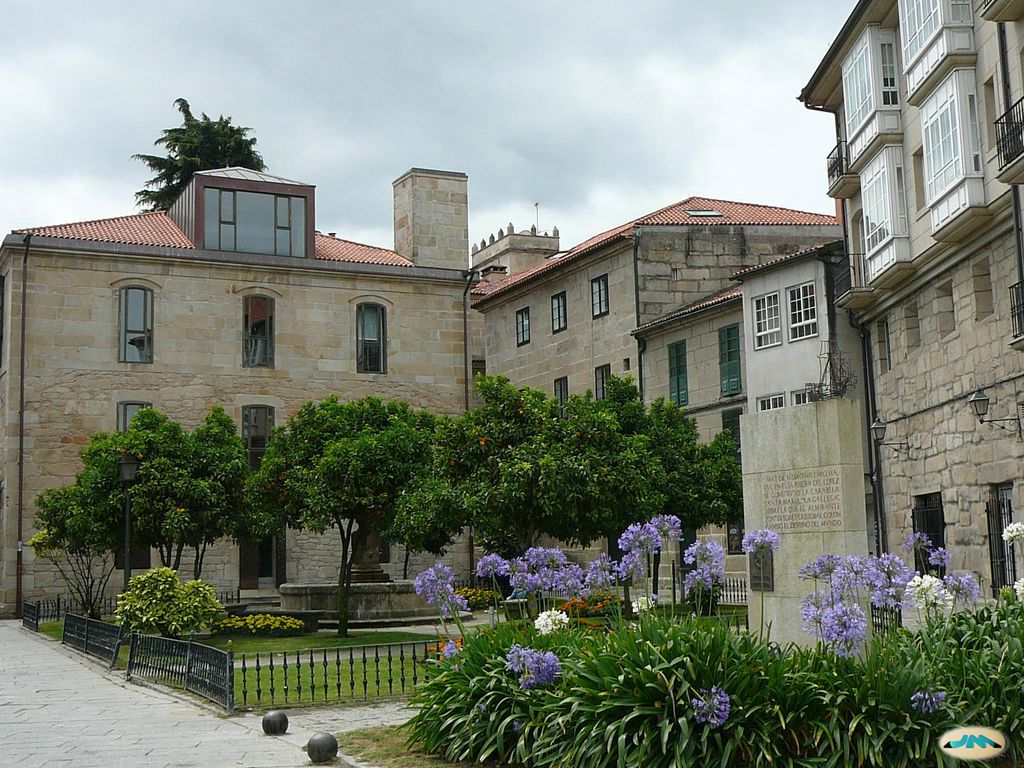
Flowers in the square

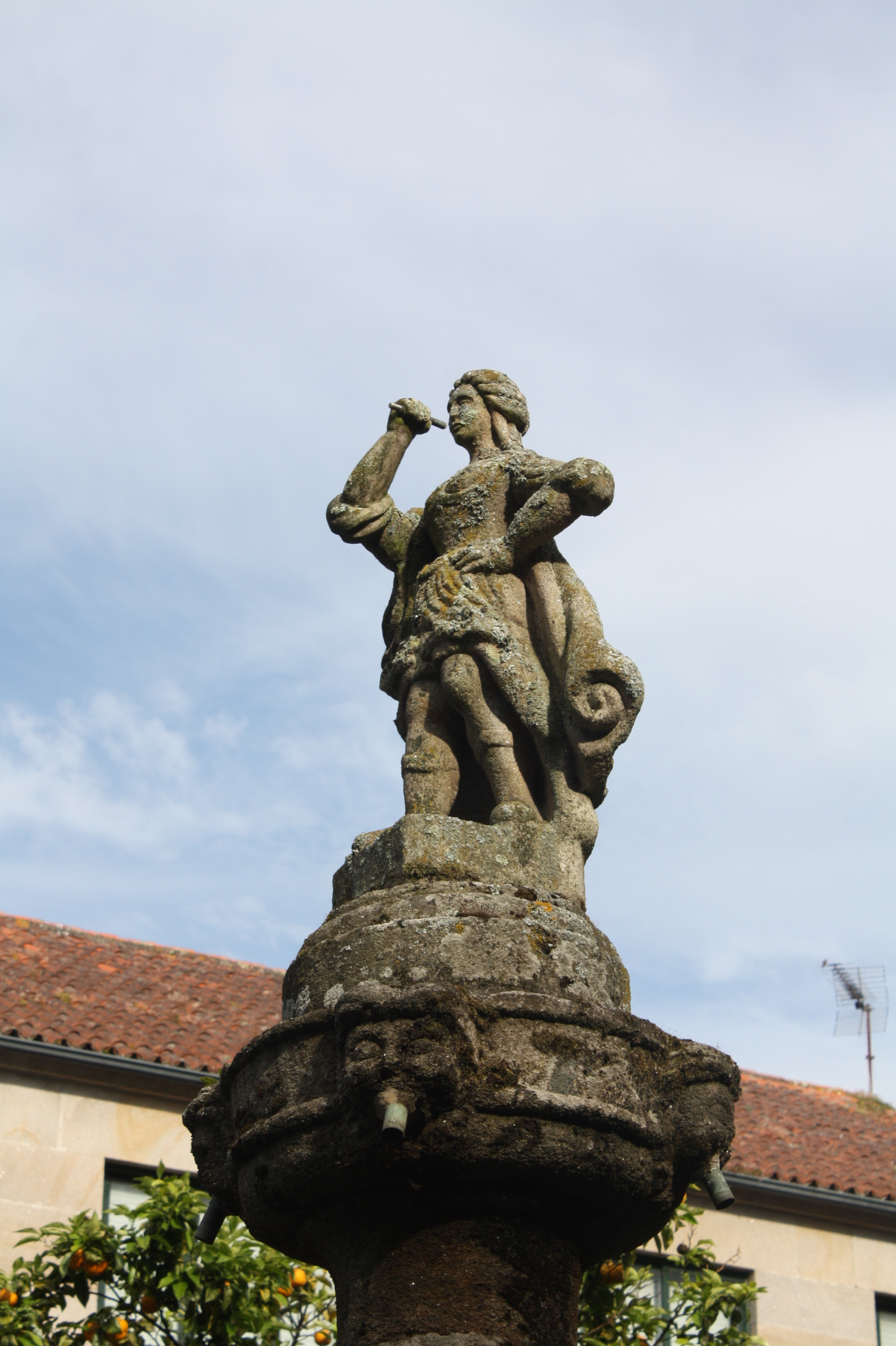
Statue of the Roman goddess Fama crowning the fountain in the square

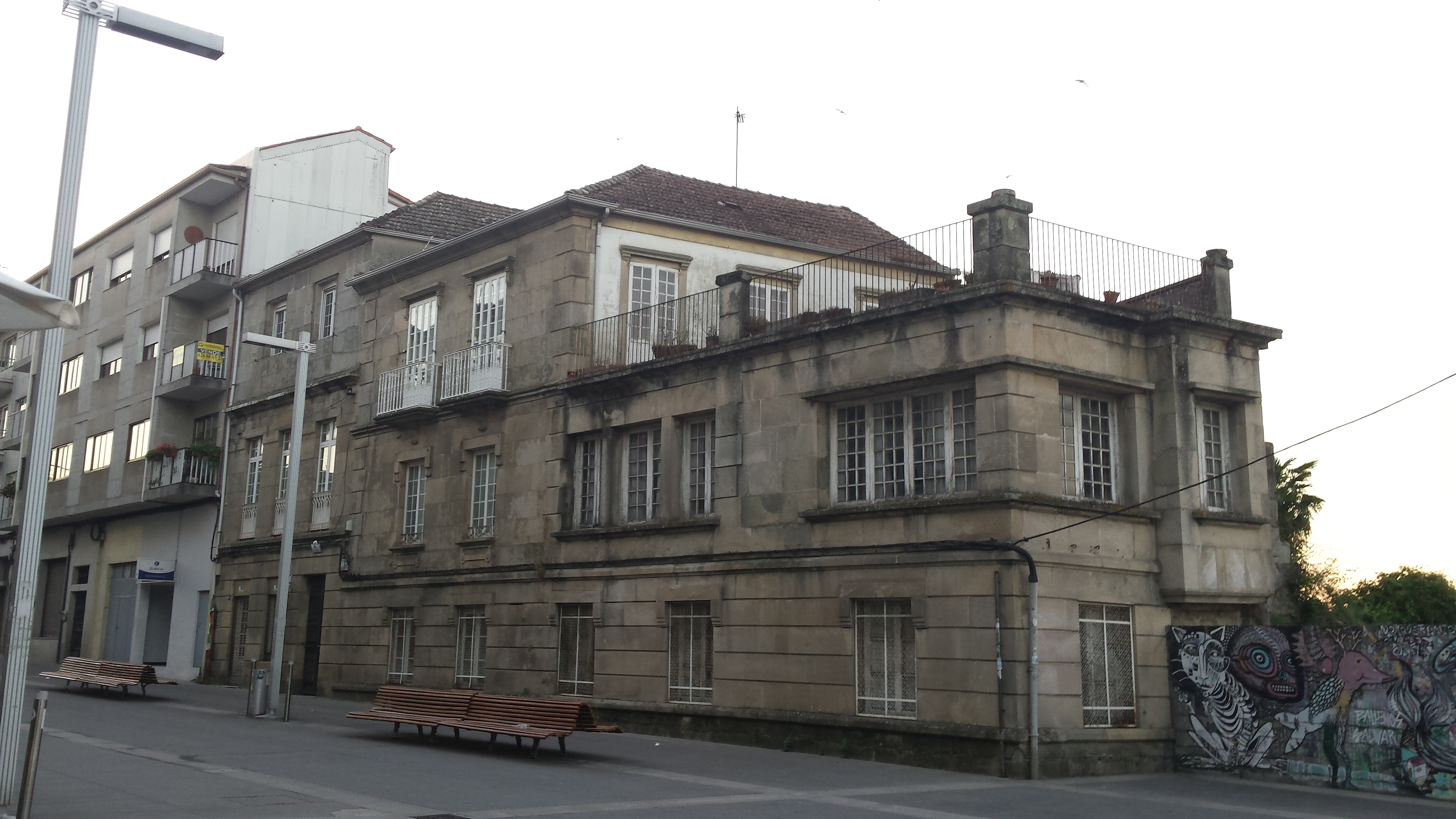
Birthplace of Xosé Filgueira Valverde

== See also ==
=== Bibliography ===
- Aganzo, Carlos (2010). Pontevedra. Ciudades con encanto (in Spanish). Madrid: El País-Aguilar. p. 82. ISBN 978-8403509344.
- Fontoira Surís, Rafael (2009). Pontevedra Monumental (in Galician). Pontevedra: Diputación de Pontevedra. p. 531. ISBN 9788484573272.
- González Zúñiga, Claudio (1848). Descripción Geográfica, Estadística, Económica e Histórica de la Ciudad Capital de Pontevedra (in Spanish). Pontevedra: Establecimiento Tipográfico de la Viuda de Pintos. p. 6.
- Nieto González, Remigio (1980). Pontevedra. Guía monumental ilustrada (in Spanish). Pontevedra: Asociación de comerciantes de la calle Manuel Quiroga. p. 32.
- Riveiro Tobío, Elvira (2008). Descubrir Pontevedra (in Spanish). Pontevedra: Edicións do Cumio. pp. 55–56. ISBN 9788482890852.

=== Related articles ===
- Old town of Pontevedra
- Building of the Official Association of Building Engineers and Technical Architects of Pontevedra
- A Moureira

=== External links ===
- Quay Square in the city hall's tourist breviary
