= Pontevedra Auditorium and Convention Centre =

Congress hall in Pontevedra, Spain

- Auditorio y Palacio de Congresos de Pontevedra
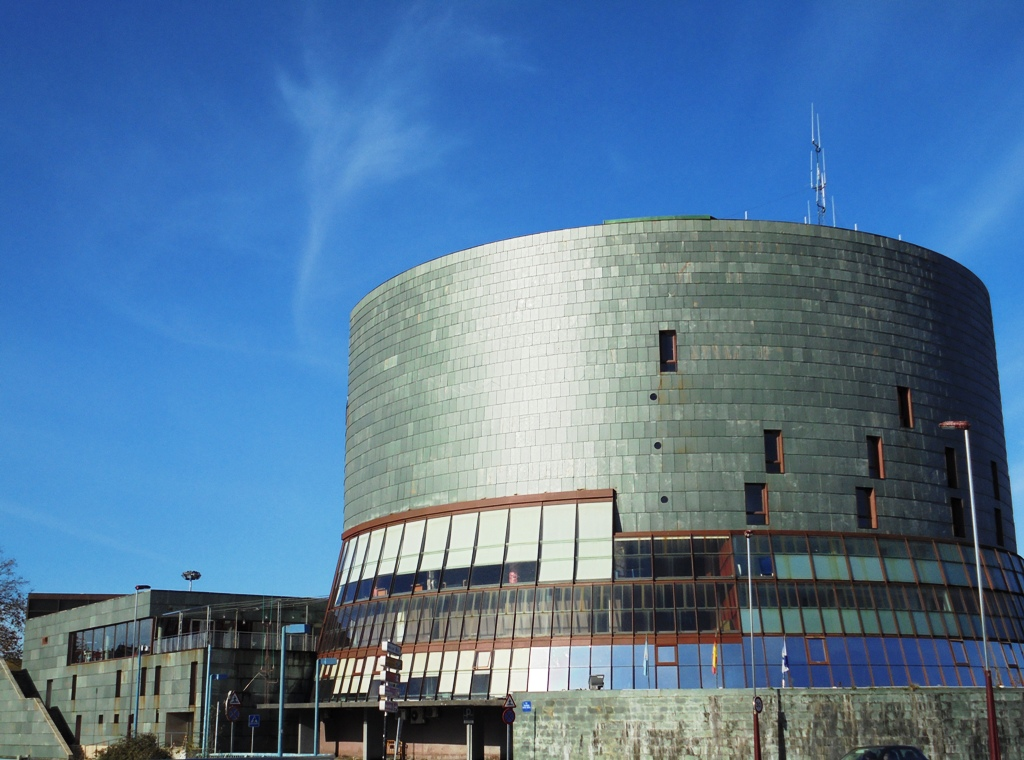
- Interactive map of the Pontevedra Auditorium and Convention Centre area
- Alternative names: Pazo da Cultura

General information
- Type: Auditorium and Convention Centre
- Location: Pontevedra, Galicia, Spain
- Coordinates: 42°26′08.1″N 8°38′13.9″W
- Construction started: 1993
- Completed: 1997
- Opening: 1997
- Owner: City Council of Pontevedra
- Management: Pazo de Congresos e Exposicións

Design and construction
- Architect: Manuel de las Casas

Website
- Official website

The Pontevedra Auditorium and Convention Centre is a building that hosts conventions, exhibitions, concerts, plays and ballet and dance performances in Pontevedra (Spain). It is located in the northern part of the city, next to the Lérez river and the Tirantes bridge and was designed by the architect Manuel de las Casas.

== History ==
The construction of the Pontevedra Auditorium and Convention Centre was planned at the beginning of the 1990s as part of an extensive urban planning project for the development of the north-eastern part of the city, on the reclaimed land of an old marsh.

The project included the construction of a cable-stayed bridge, the Tirantes Bridge, to serve the auditorium and as an exit from the city to the north, an exhibition centre annexed to the Auditorium in front of the Rosalía de Castro Park, and the development of the banks of the Lérez River and the Island of Sculptures park.

The architect Manuel de las Casas won the preliminary design competition for the construction of the convention centre, the resolution of which was announced on 2 November 1991. He designed the project in 1992. Construction of the Convention Centre began in 1993 and the auditorium was opened in 1997, while the exhibition centre was inaugurated in 1998.

The palace was inaugurated on 20 September 1997, with the exhibition The Neutrality of the Order by Manuel de las Casas and a concert by mezzo-soprano Teresa Berganza and the Royal Galician Philharmonic conducted by Maximino Zumalave.

Just afterwards, on 24 and 25 September 1997, a congress on Infrastructure, Environment and Regional Development was held in the convention centre.

== Description ==
With its contemporary architecture, the palace comprises a complex of buildings covering 10,000 m^{2}, which includes an exhibition area, plenary rooms, an auditorium and a restaurant area. It is a multi-purpose building that allows all its spaces to be used at the same time.

The most characteristic aspect of the exterior of the palace are the green slate slabs, corten steel, copper and glass which, together with the harmonious ensemble of the building's volumes, such as the cube of the exhibition hall, favour its integration into the surrounding landscape and greenery. Manuel de las Casas organises the terrain by designing artificial platforms, squares and stone terraces that overlook the ria, the Lérez and the city.

The complex is composed of pure volumes with a cylinder for the Auditorium and two prisms on different floors, housing a large exhibition hall, the Convention Centre, a restaurant and a cafeteria. The congress hall and meeting rooms are located inside the trapezoidal prism. On the square-based prism, the entrance and the large skylight lead to the exhibition hall on the lower level. At the edge of the Lérez, the building is accessed by a stone staircase covered by the green slate wall.

The Pontevedra Convention Centre has been designed to host different types of events, conventions, trade fairs, public fairs, exhibitions, corporate events, business conventions, seminars, symposiums, conferences - whatever format or tone the organisers wish to give it. Its advantages can be summed up in two words: modularity and functionality.

=== Surfaces and number of seats ===
The convention centre offers :

- a total net floor area of 10,000 m2
- a main auditorium with 772 seats. According to the architect Manuel de las Casas, in the concert hall or main auditorium, undulating and even whimsical shapes were sought to avoid sound bouncing.
- an auditorium or conference room with 276 seats
- a 100-seat meeting room
- a light and bright exhibition hall of 1,220 m2
- a panoramic restaurant with a view of the Lérez River and the Tirantes Bridge
- 8 seminar rooms
- a workshop room for 40 people
- a press room
- a VIP room
- rehearsal room, rest room, sewing room, 10 dressing rooms.
- a public car park for 1300 vehicles

== Events ==
In addition to concerts and shows, it hosts conventions and exhibitions such as Culturgal, the fair of cultural activities in Galicia and publishing houses, Pont Up Store, Cantos na maré, Etiqueta Negra, Edugal, Debut, etc.

== Gallery ==
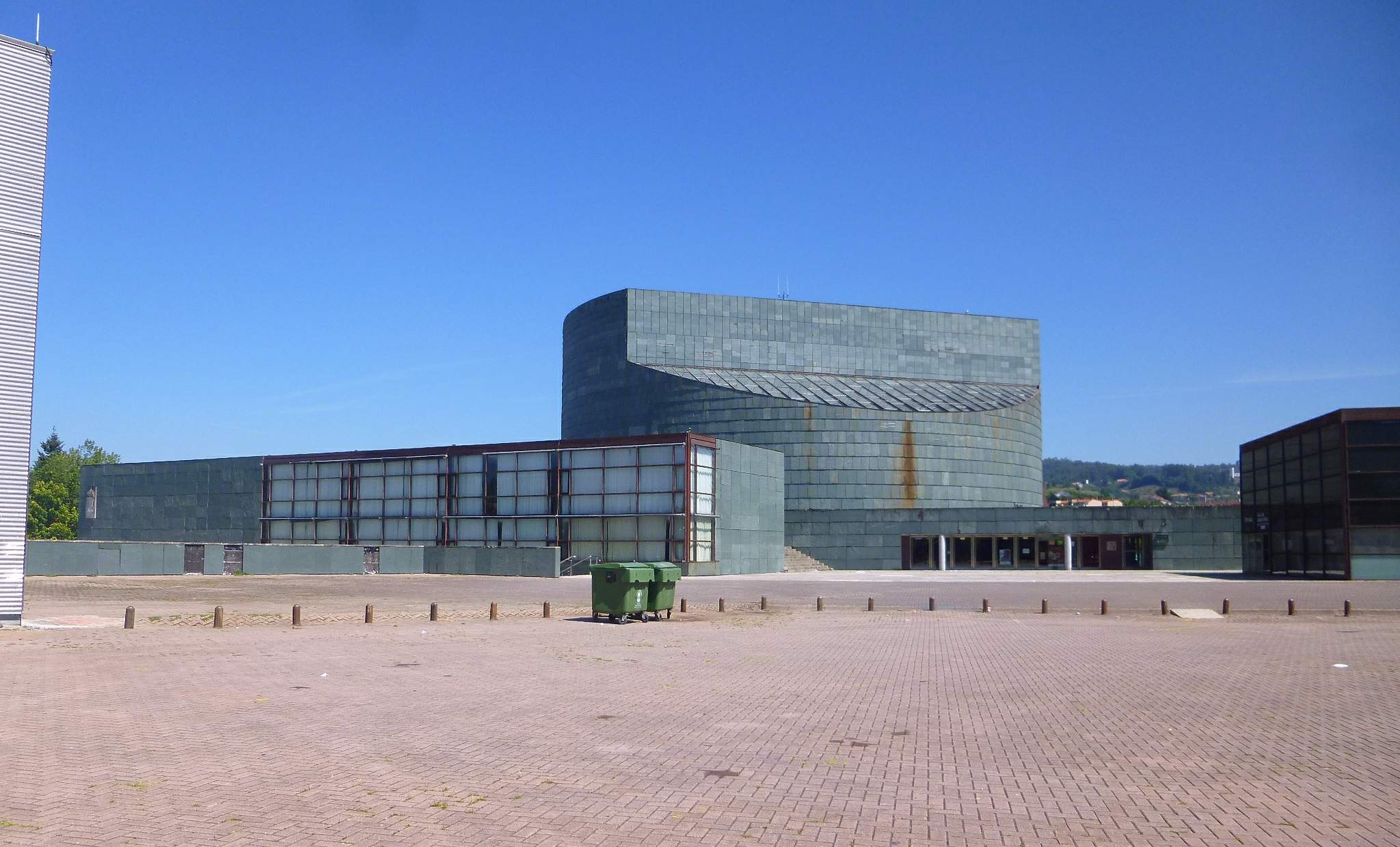
Upper section

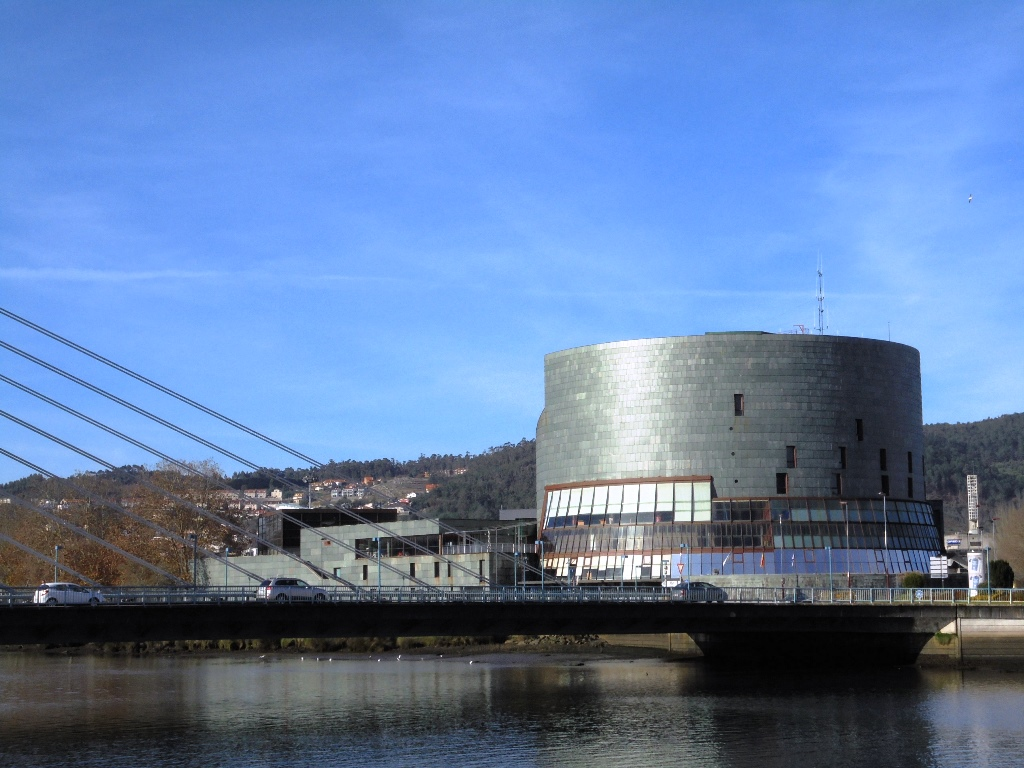
Façade

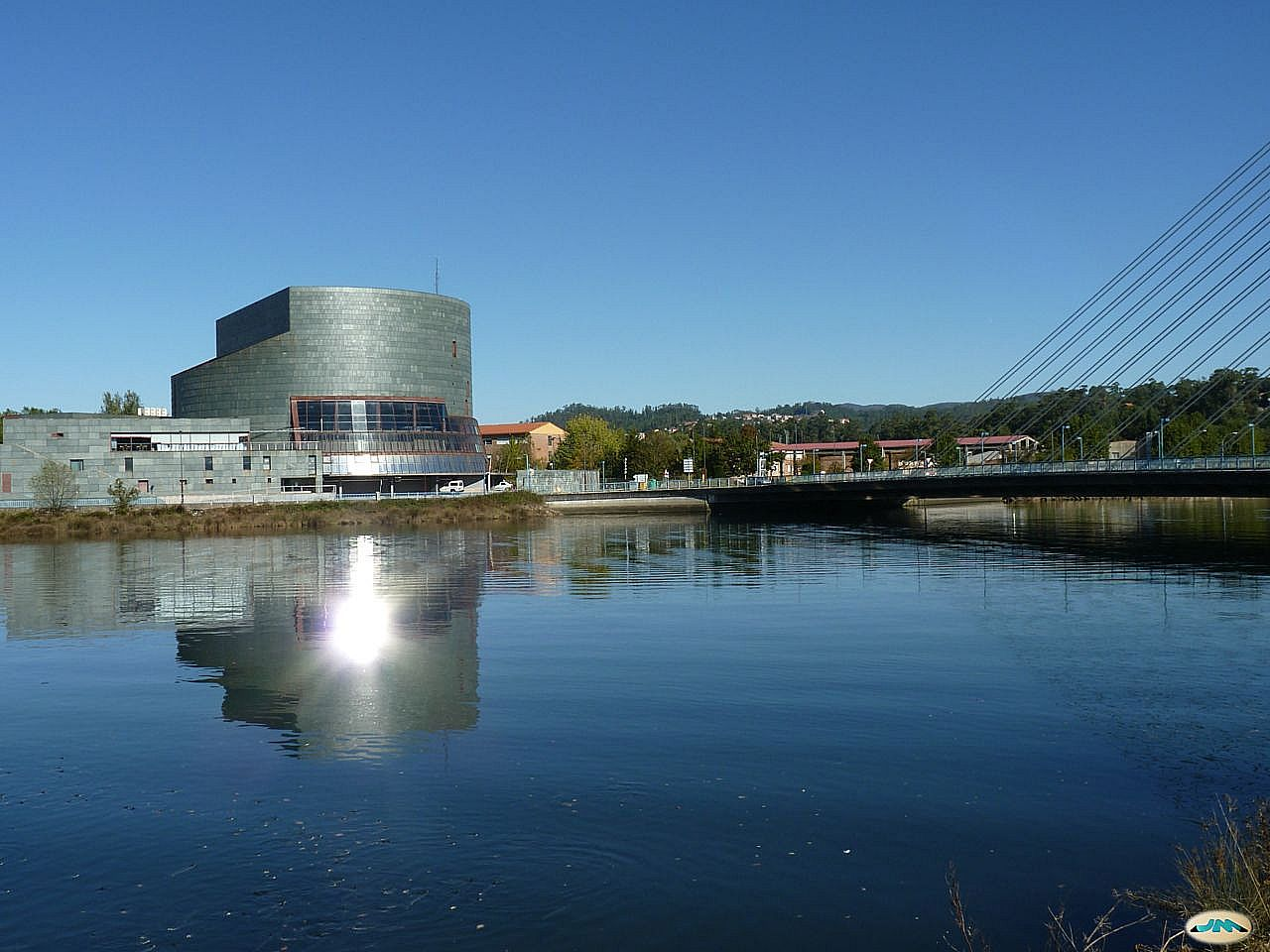
Façade integrated into the landscape

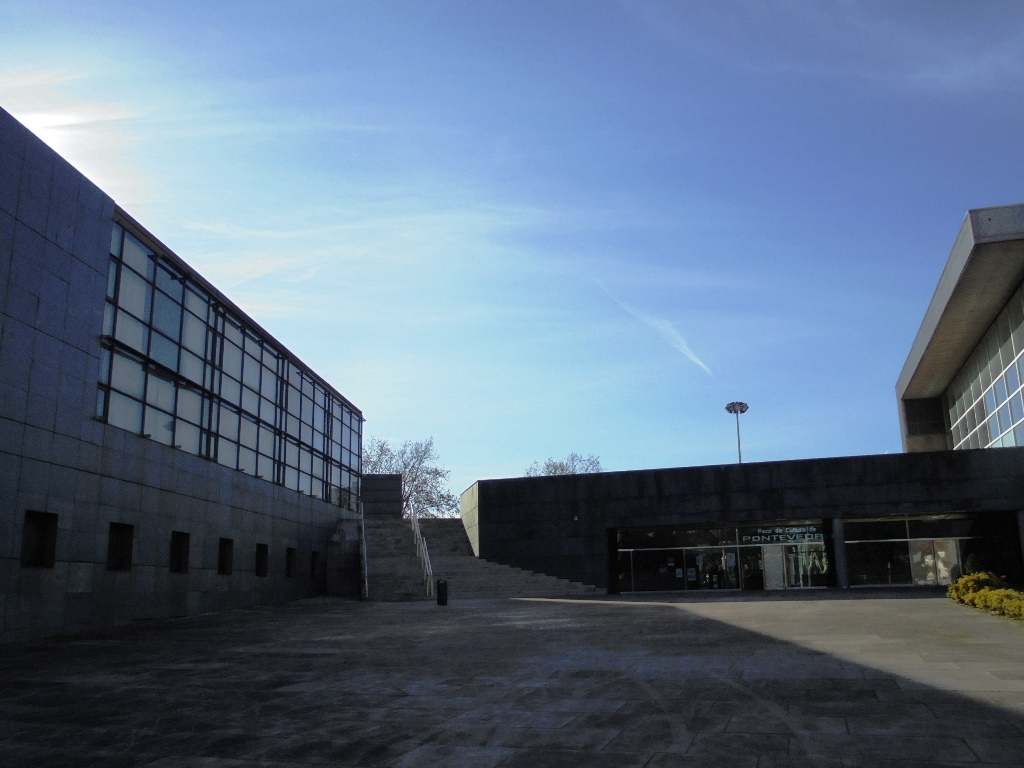
Entrance hall

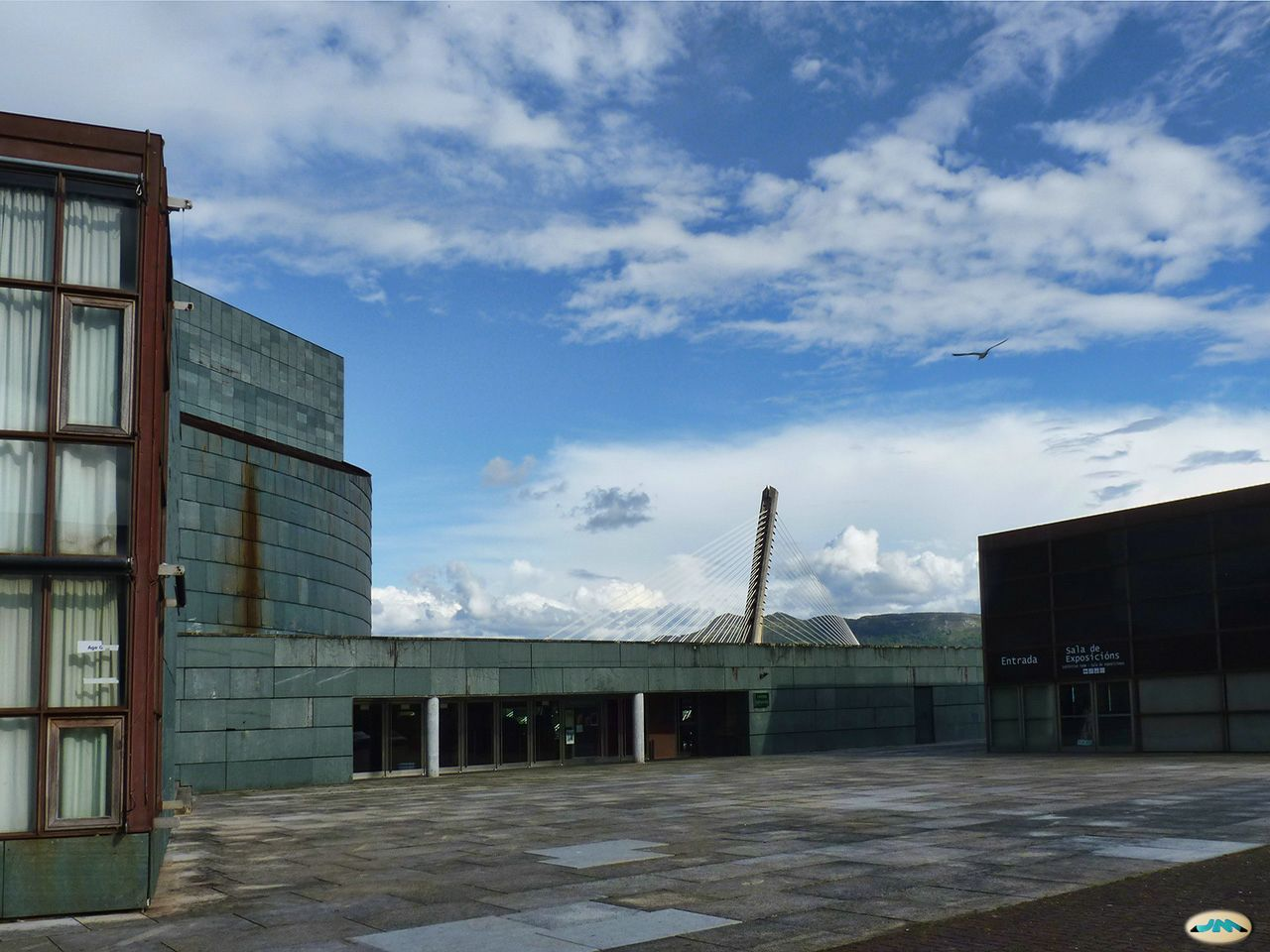
Entrance

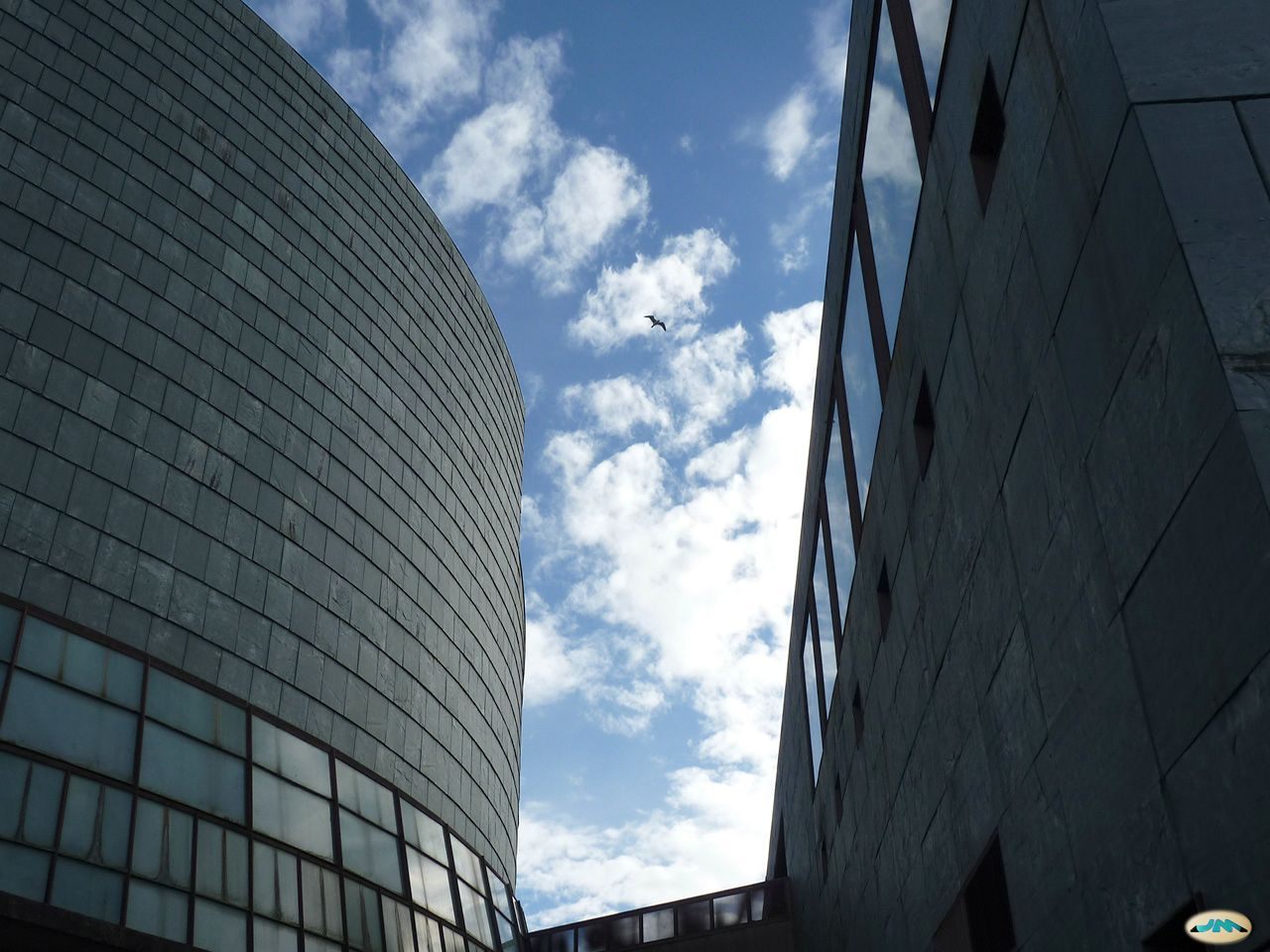
Auditorium in the foreground

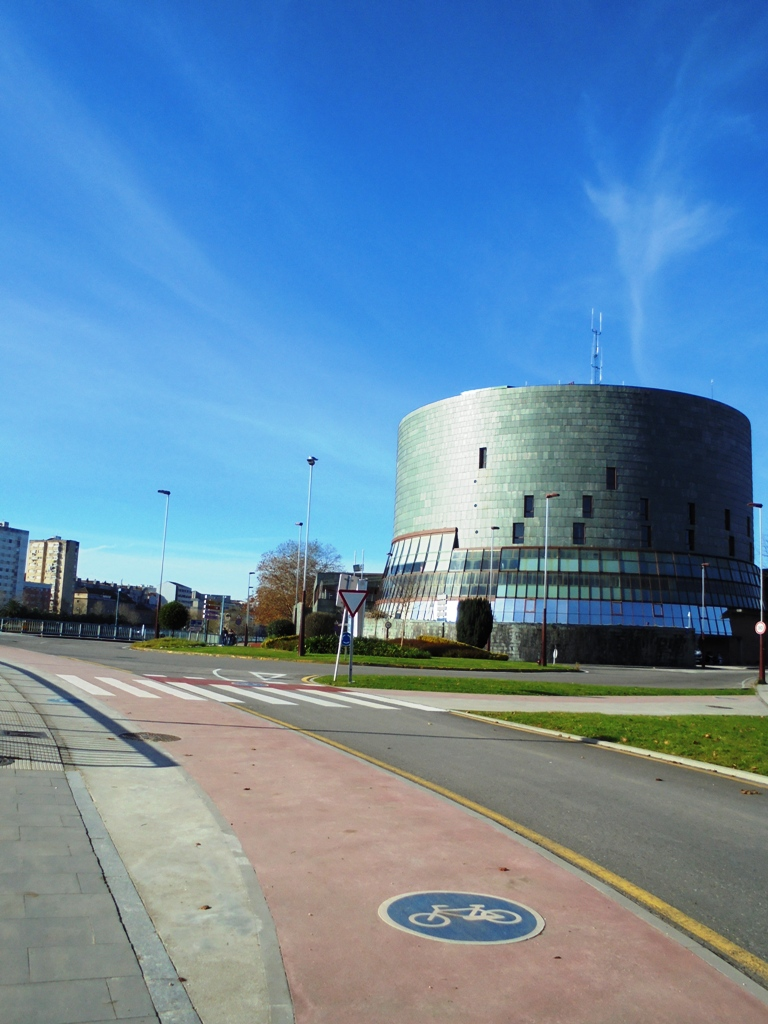
Cycle path in front of the palace

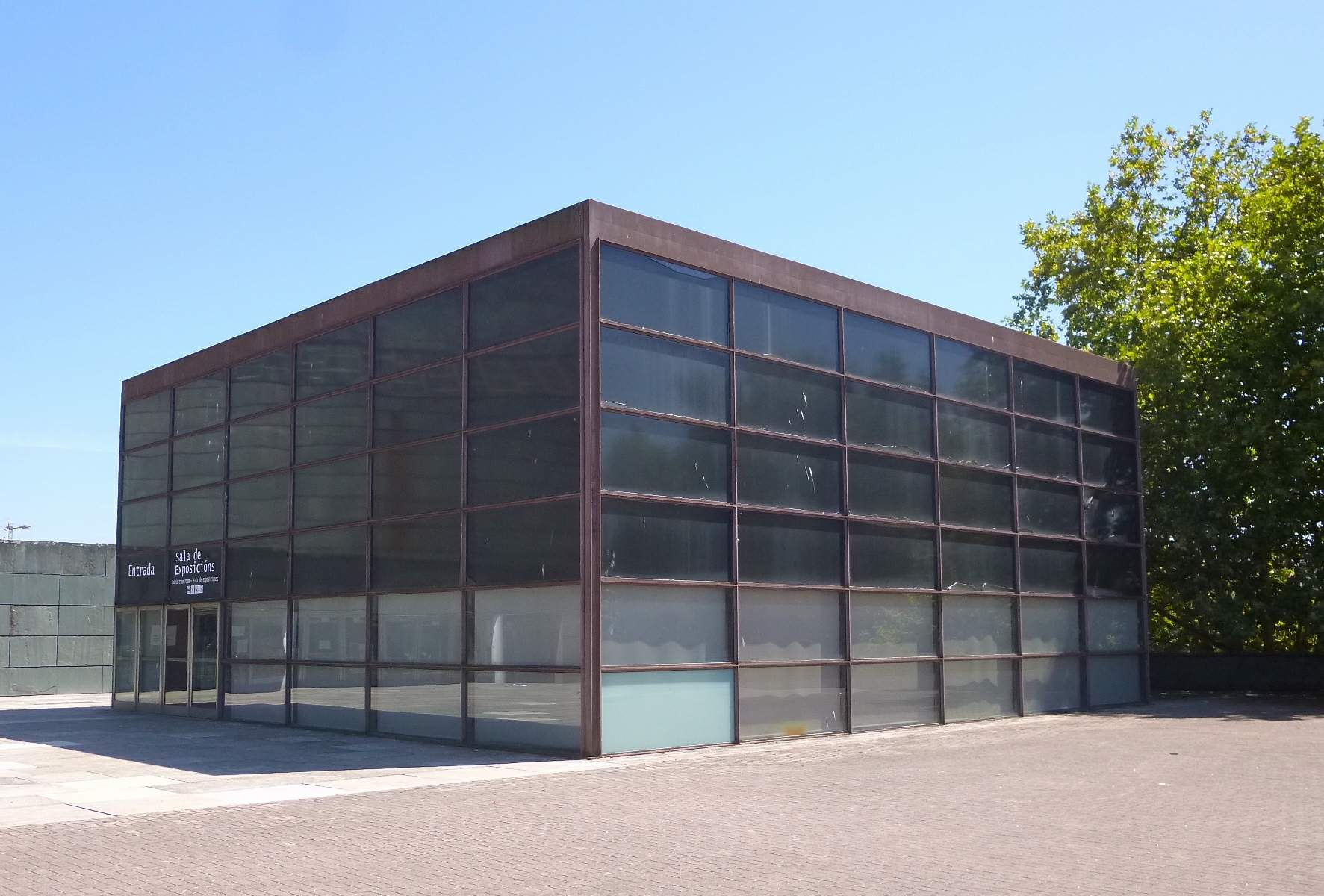
Glass cube in the exhibition hall

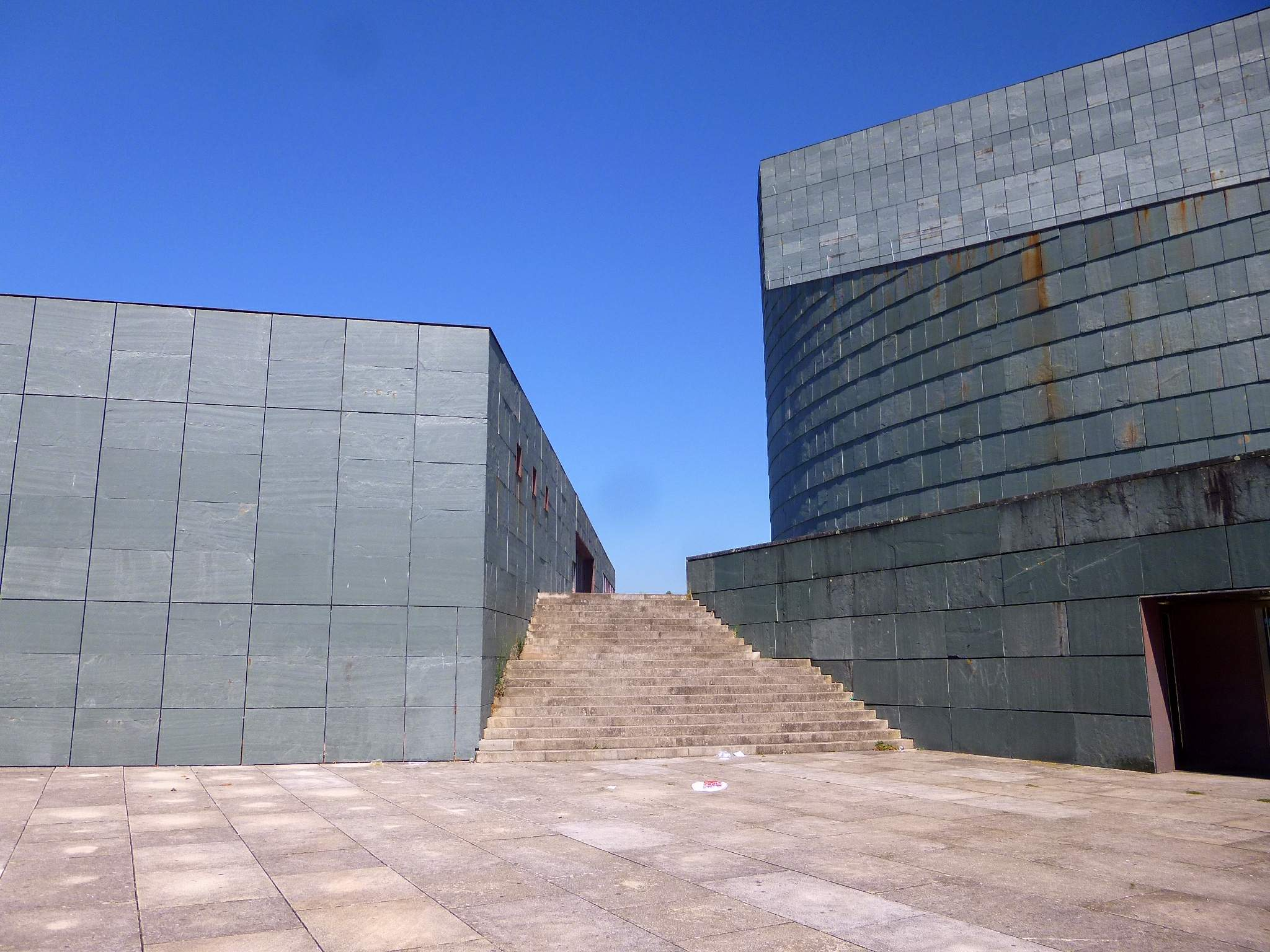
Stairs that are part of the palace

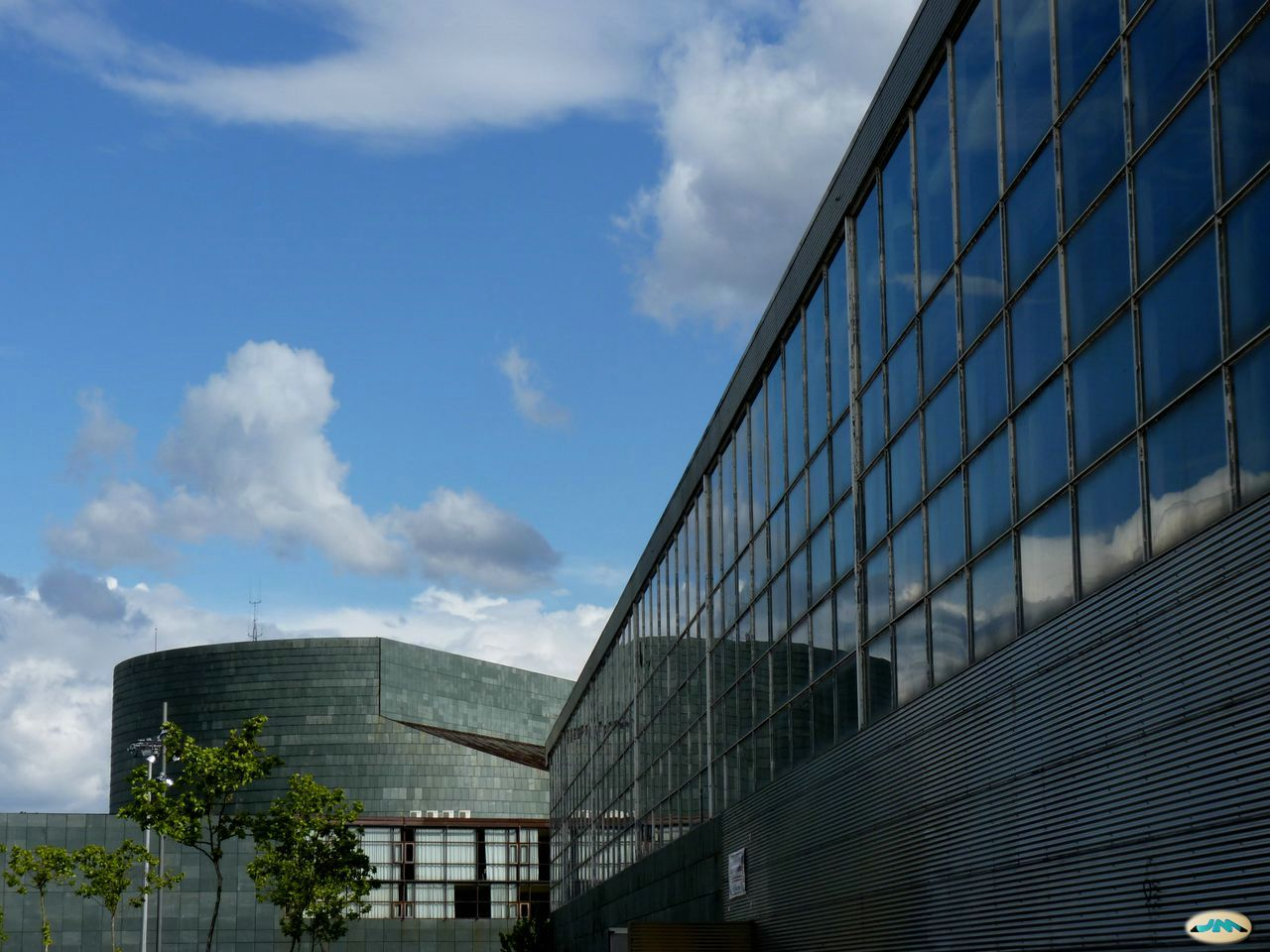
Exhibition centre

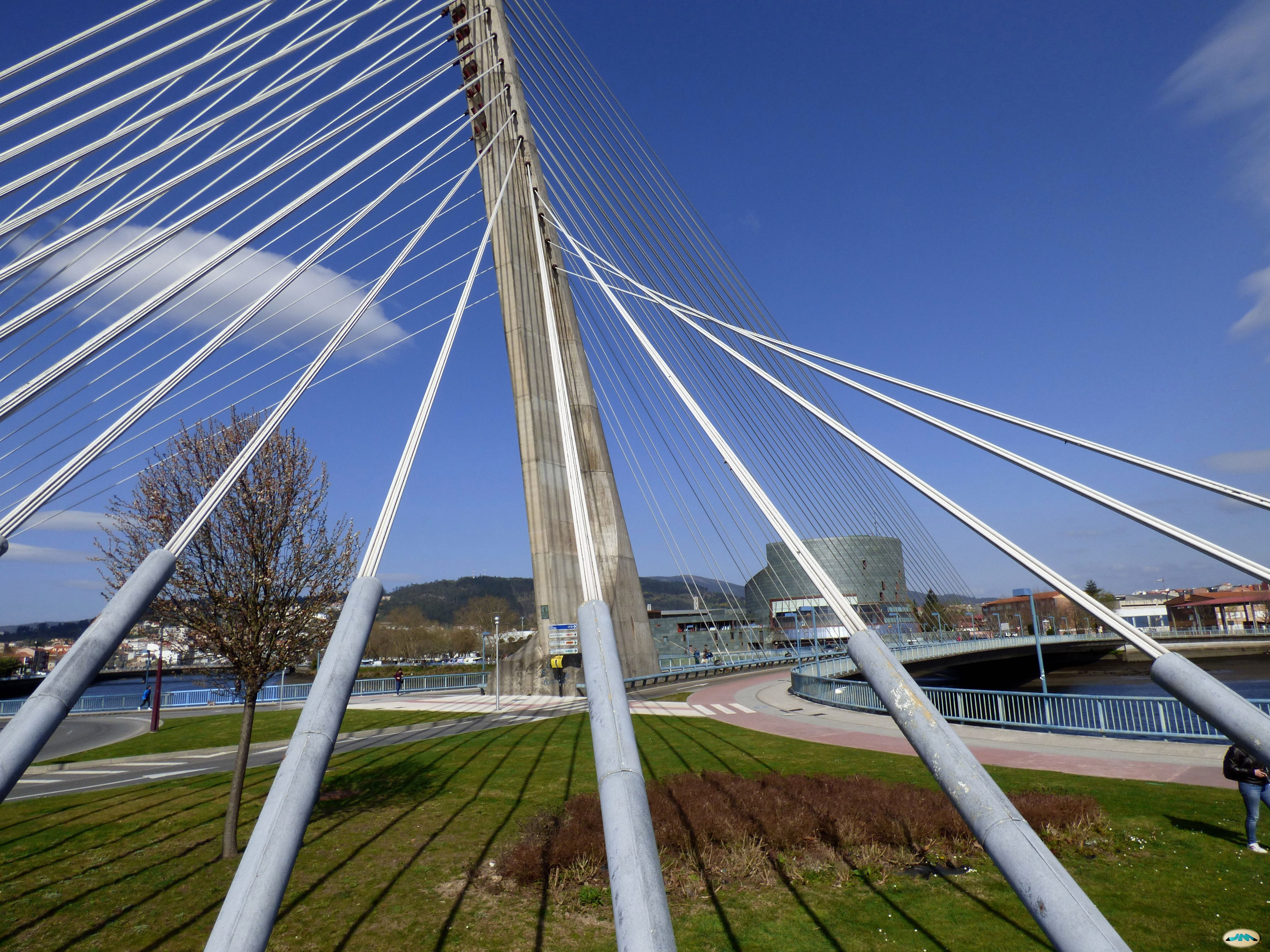
View of the palace from the Tirantes Bridge

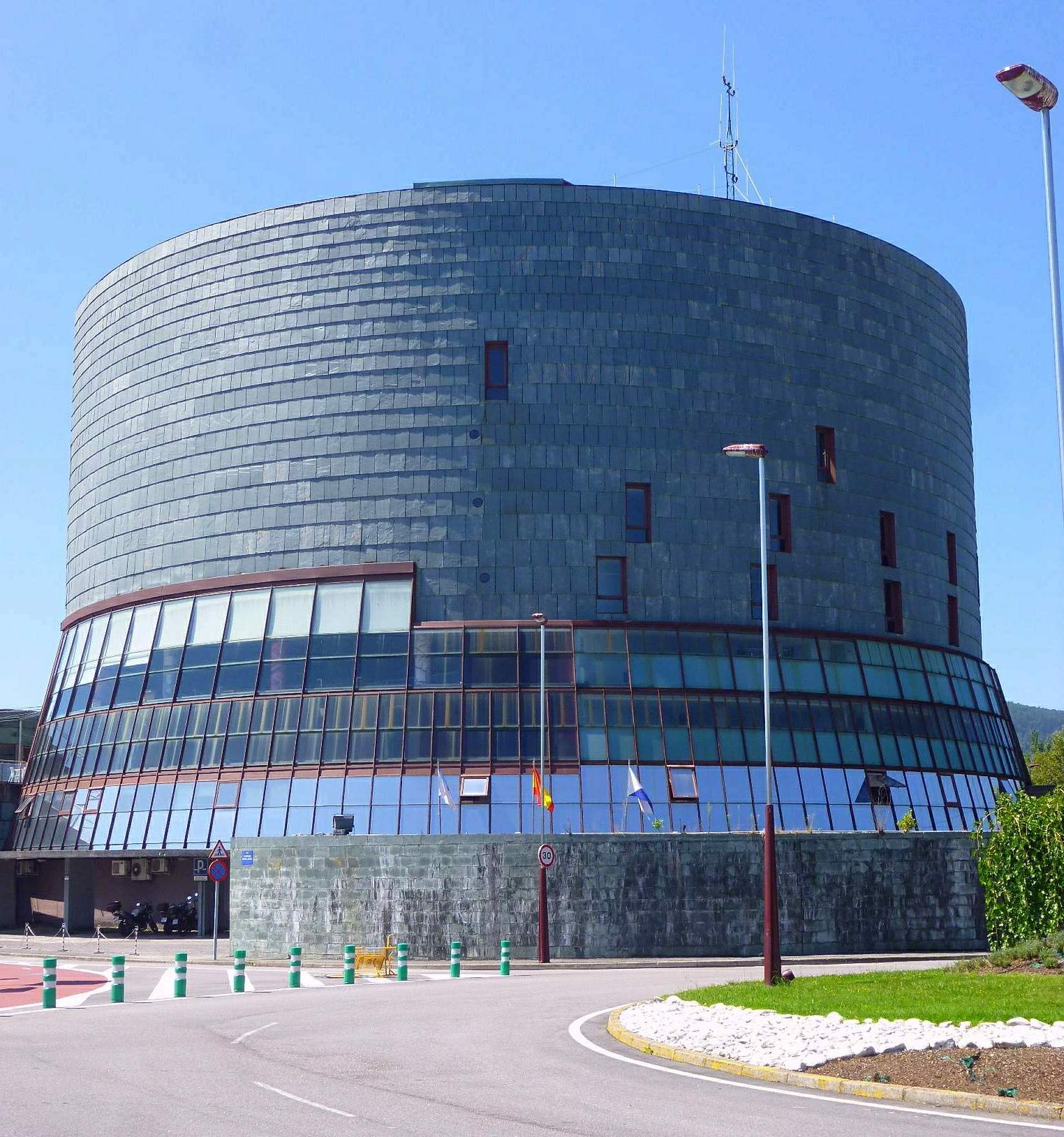
Auditorium

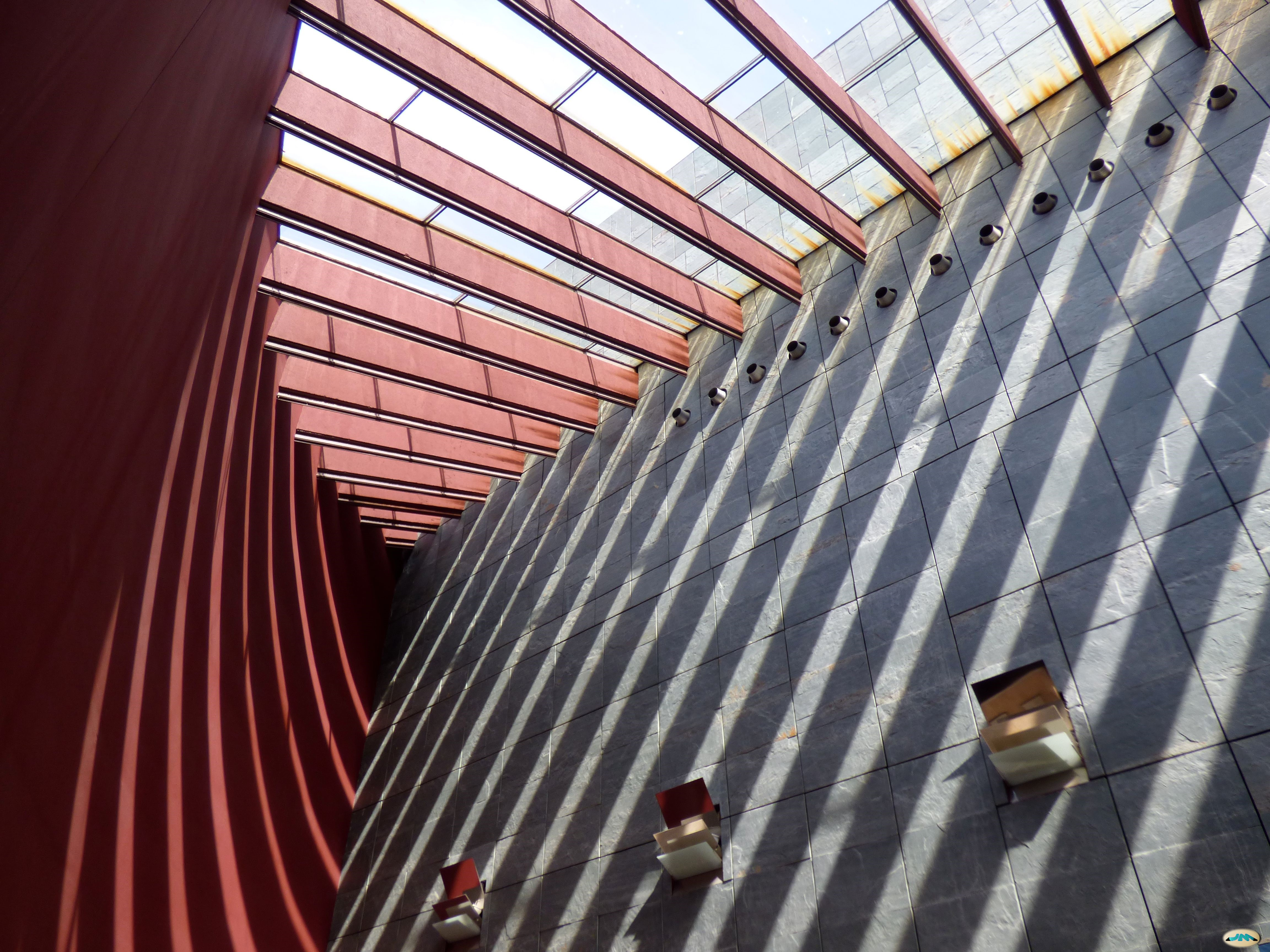
Auditorium Hall

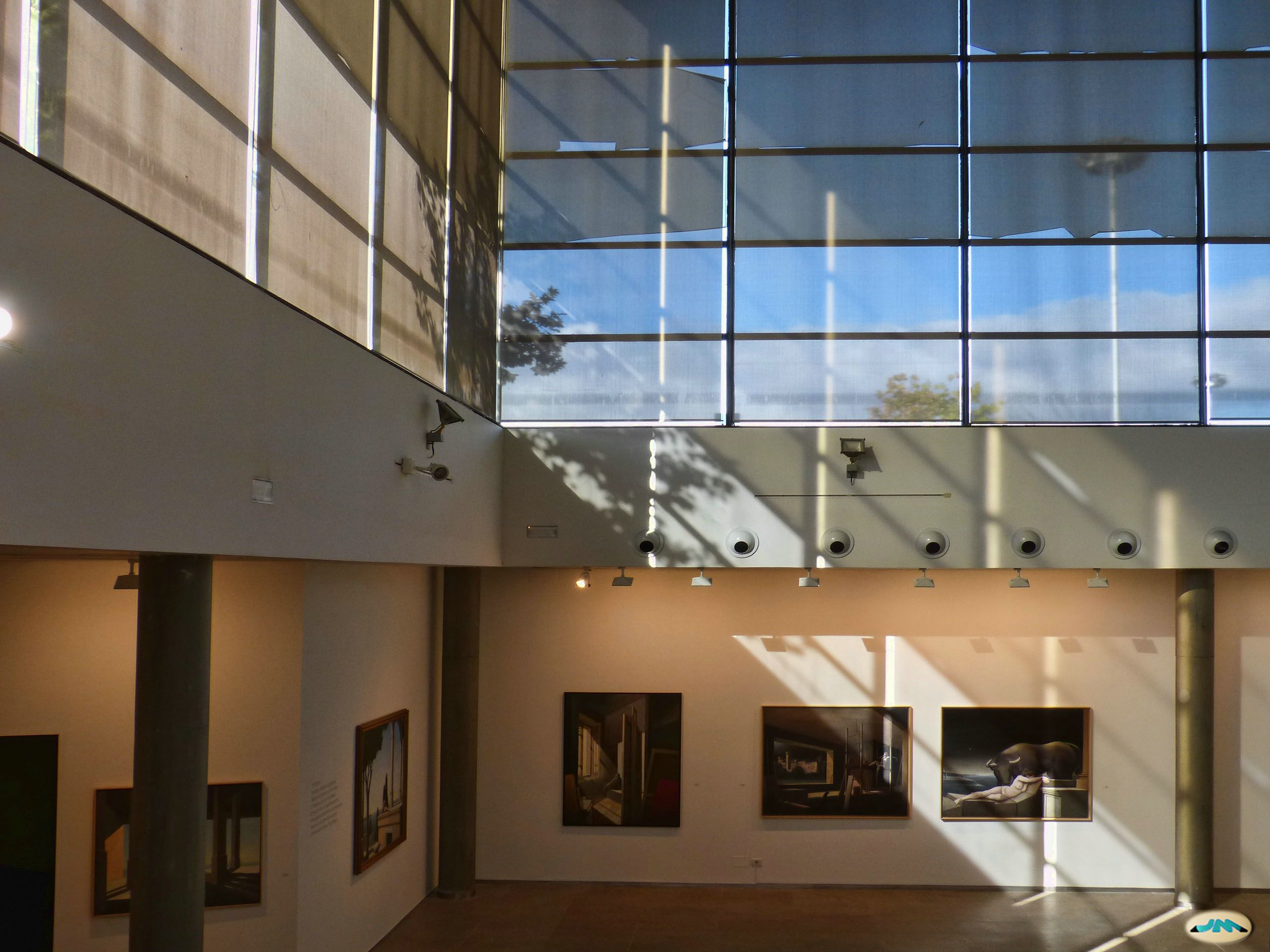
Interior of the exhibition hall

== See also ==
=== Bibliography ===
- Aganzo, Carlos (2010). Pontevedra. Ciudades con encanto (in Spanish). Madrid: El País-Aguilar. pp. 106–107. ISBN 978-8403509344.
- Riveiro Tobío, Elvira (2008). Descubrir Pontevedra (in Spanish). Pontevedra: Edicións do Cumio. p. 69. ISBN 9788482890852.

=== Related articles ===
- Pontevedra Exhibition Centre
- Principal Theatre
- Manuel de las Casas

=== External links ===
- Palacio de Congresos y Exposiciones de Pontevedra on the Structurae website
- Palacio de Congresos y Exposiciones de Pontevedra on the website Galicia Tourism
- Pazo da Cultura website
- Culturgal website
