= Manuel de las Casas =

Spanish architect (born 1940)

- Born: Manuel de las Casas Gómez; 1940; Talavera de la Reina, Spain
- Died: February 8, 2014 (aged 74); Madrid, Spain
- Occupation: Architect
- Awards: Spain National Architecture Award(1999); Gold Medal of Fine Arts (Ministry of Culture)(1995)
- Buildings: Pontevedra Auditorium and Convention Centre; Pontevedra Exhibition Centre

Manuel de las Casas (1940 - 8 February 2014) was a Spanish architect.

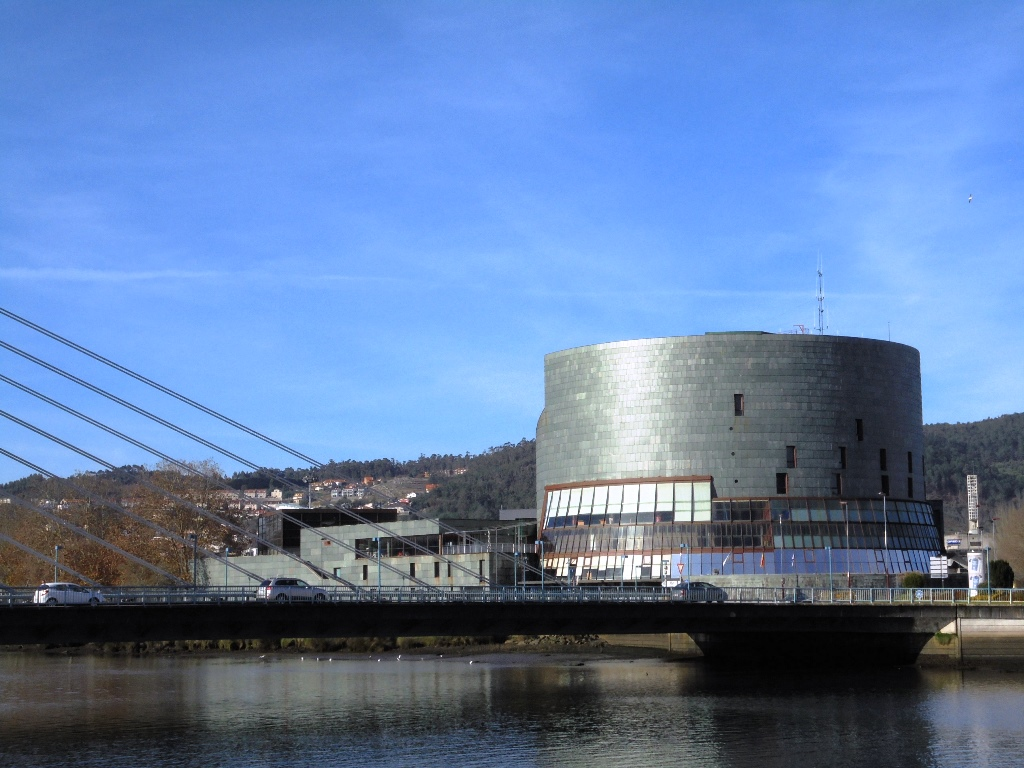
Pontevedra Auditorium and Convention Centre.

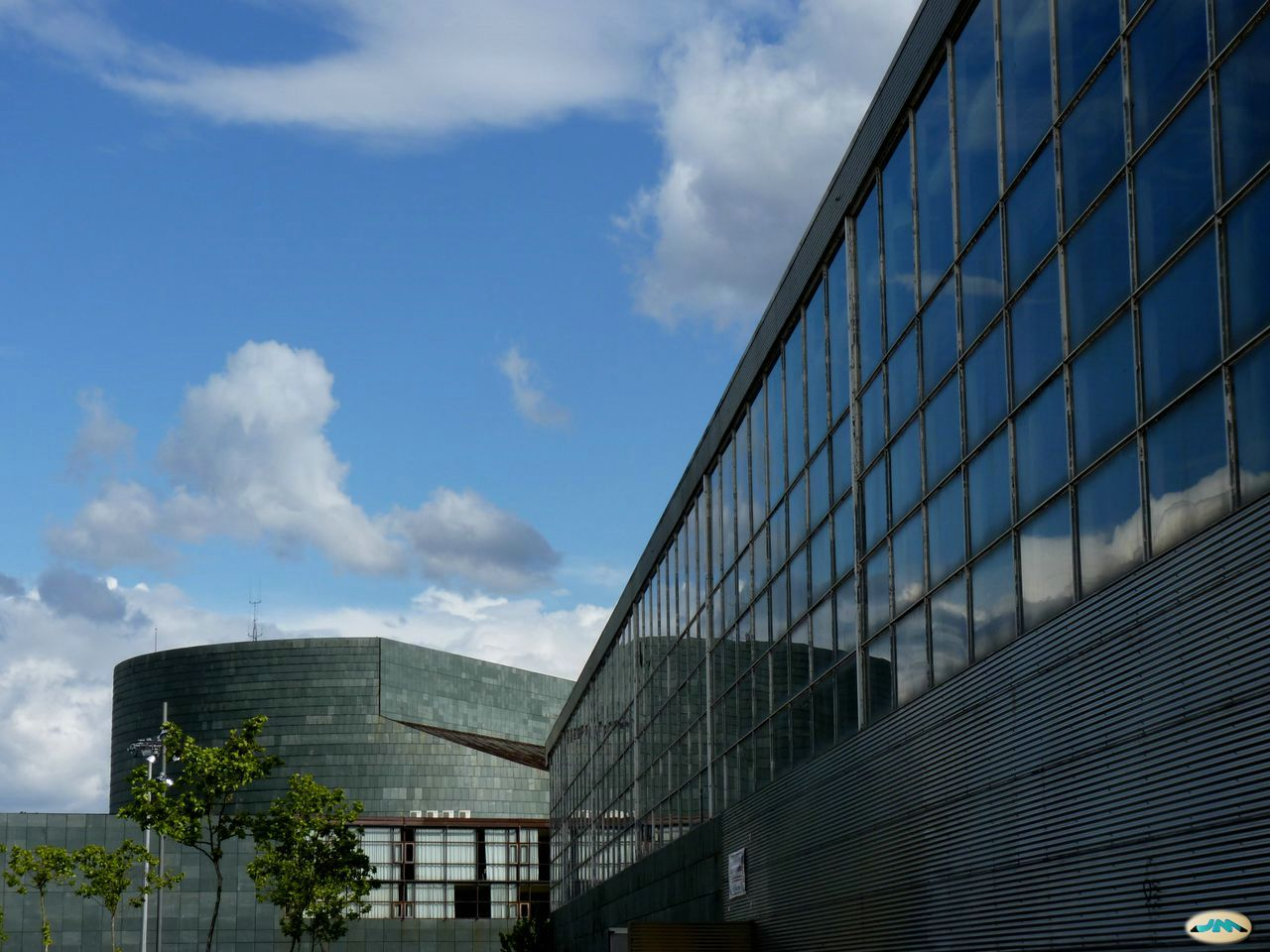
Pontevedra Auditorium and Exhibition Centre.

== Biography ==
He graduated from the Higher Technical School of Architecture of Madrid in 1964 and received his doctorate from the same school in 1966, where he also taught in the Projects Department.

In addition, he was appointed Chief Inspector of the Monument Restoration Service (Ministry of Culture) in 1979, first Deputy Director General of Projects and Works, then Director General of the General Directorate of Architecture and Construction (Ministry of Public Works) and Director of the Architecture Biennale in 1983.

== Notable works ==
- Restoration of Toledo Cathedral (Toledo, 1982)
- Church and parish centre of Santa Irene (Madrid), 1984
- Castilla-La Mancha Pavilion in Seville Expo '92, (Seville, 1991)
- King Alfonso Enriques Hispano-Portuguese Institute (Zamora): renovation of a Franciscan convent, 1993
- Ministry of Agriculture (Toledo), 1993
- 198 social housing units (Alcobendas)
- Pontevedra Auditorium and Convention Centre (Pontevedra), 1997
- Faculty of Health Sciences (A Coruña), 1998
- Royal Foundation of Toledo (Toledo), 1998
- Pontevedra Exhibition Centre (Pontevedra), 1998
- Cultural Centre (Villaviciosa de Odón)
- Sánchez-Médina House (Toledo), 2004

== Awards ==
- Urban Planning and Architecture Award (Madrid City Council 1986)
- Urban Planning and Architecture Prize (Madrid City Council 1991)
- I Spanish Architecture Biennial (Ministry of Public Works, 1991)
- II Spanish Architecture Biennial (MOPU, 1993)
- Hispano-Portuguese Institute "Rei Alfonso Henriques" (Ministry of Education and Culture and the Deputation of Zamora, 1993)
- Gold Medal of Fine Arts (Ministry of Culture, 1995)
- Gold Medal of the City of Toledo (Toledo City Council, 1998)
- Iberoamerican Biennial of Architecture and Civil Engineering (1998)
- Quality Award for Aesthetics (Community of Madrid, 1998)
- VIII Edition of the COAG Architecture Award: Best New Plant Buildings (Official College of Architects of Galicia, 1998)
- National Architecture Award (Spain, 1999)
- Anthological Award for Contemporary Architecture for the best private housing (Castilla-La Mancha, 2006)

== Bibliography ==
- M. de las Casas. Instituto Hispano-Luso Rei Alfonso Enriques, Ministerio de Fomento, General Directorate of Housing, Architecture and Urbanism, 1999 ISBN 84-498-0394-2.
