= Pontevedra Exhibition Centre =

Exhibition and Trade Fair centre in Pontevedra, Spain

- Recinto Ferial de Pontevedra
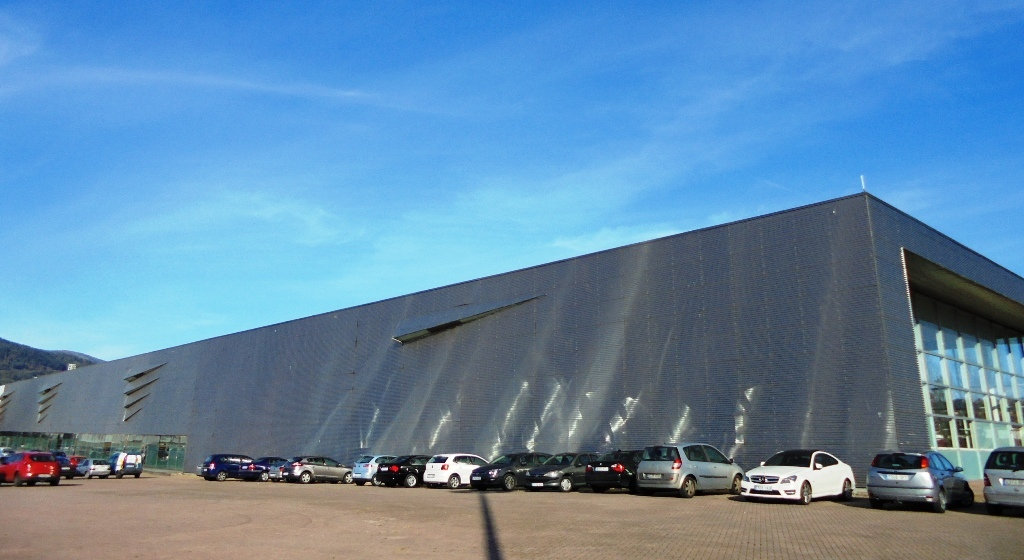
- Interactive map of the Pontevedra Exhibition Centre area
- Alternative names: Recinto ferial

General information
- Type: Exhibition and Trade Fair Centre
- Location: Pontevedra, Galicia, Spain
- Coordinates: 42°26′09.9″N 8°38′21.8″W
- Construction started: 1997
- Completed: 1998
- Opening: 17 December 1998
- Owner: City Council of Pontevedra
- Management: Pazo de Congresos e Exposicións

Design and construction
- Architect: Manuel de las Casas

Website
- Official website

The Pontevedra Exhibition Centre is a complex for events such as exhibitions, fairs and conventions. It is in the Rosalía de Castro Park, near the banks of the Lérez River in Pontevedra, Galicia (Spain).

== History ==
The exhibition centre was built in 1997, on the initiative of the Galician Government, with a modern architecture. It is the work of the architect Manuel de las Casas, who was entrusted with the project as an annex to the Pontevedra Auditorium and Convention Centre. He presented the project that best integrated the two buildings, achieving harmony between the whole complex and the spaces on the banks of the Lérez.

The Exhibition Centre was inaugurated on 17 December 1998 and opened to the public with the Pomóvil Automobile Fair inaugurated by the President of the Xunta de Galicia.

The Exhibition Centre was managed from 1998 until 2020 by the autonomous body Palacio de Congresos y Exposiciones, on behalf of the City Council of Pontevedra.

== Facilities ==
The exhibition centre has an area of 7,500 m2. It consists of a building 163 metres long, 34.4 metres wide and 15.2 metres high.

The Pontevedra Trade Fair Centre has an open-air car park with a capacity of 230 vehicles. The tetrahedral-shaped building is made of steel with aluminium and glass finishes and has a total surface area of approximately 6,000 m2. The multi-purpose building has a fully covered exhibition area, prepared to host all kinds of Fairs and Exhibitions, as well as an accreditation area for conferences in the entrance hall. It offers a wide range of layout options to best adapt to and customise events.

This vast complex is complemented by the adjacent auditorium, with a total capacity of 1,118 seats and a total area of 10,000 m2. The tetrahedral-shaped building of the exhibition centre, with its hard, cold steel texture, aluminium walls and large windows, contrasts with the green slate slabs of the annex, the Pontevedra Congress Centre, to which it has direct access from the inside, allowing great versatility in the joint use of all its rooms, so that the restaurant, cafeteria and terrace services are for shared use.

The dimensions of the spaces at the Pontevedra Trade Fair Centre are as follows:

- Access hall for exhibitions and congresses : 350 m².
- Main building area: 4,140 m².
- First floor hall: 750 m².
- Warehouse of the exhibition centre: 368 m².
- Outdoor parking: 1,800 m².

It is a harmonious combination of spatiality, versatility and luminosity; a multi-purpose space, surrounded by ten thousand square metres of gardens and green spaces.

== Events ==
The exhibition centre hosts various professional and public events each year, including the Culturgal fair, the Etiqueta Negra fair (Galician gourmet products fair), the Pont Up Store fair, the Stock fair or the Si quero wedding fair, the Móvete car fair and the Mundonenos family and children's fair among others.

In addition to this, the Pontevedra Trade Fair Centre is used for a wide range of leisure activities such as the installation of an ice rink at Christmas or the celebration of open-air concerts on the outdoor esplanades.

In the past, the exhibition centre has hosted important fairs such as Ferpalia (Galician tourism fair) or events such as the Galician fashion show Pontus Veteris.

== Gallery ==
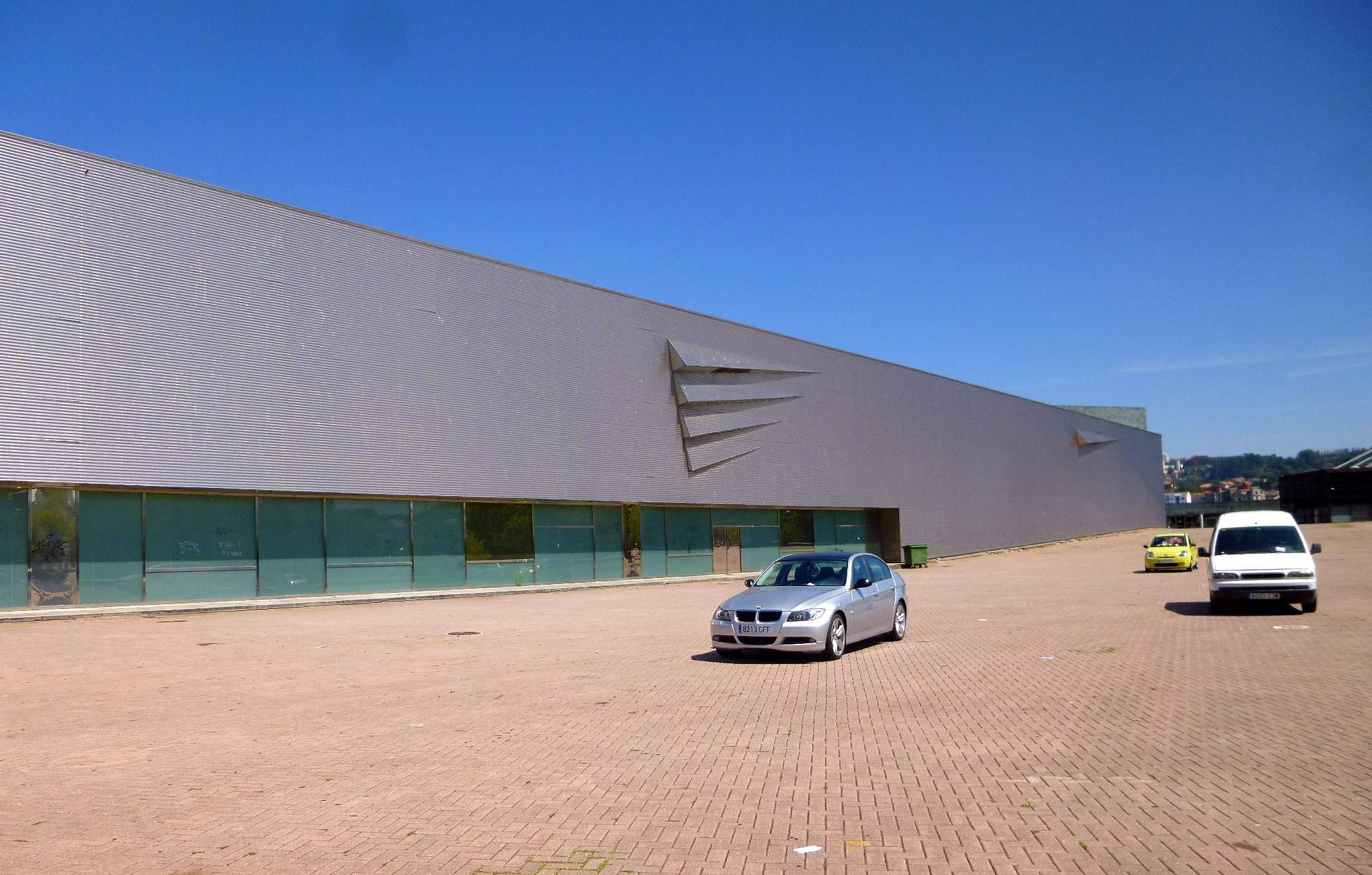
Aluminium and glass facade.

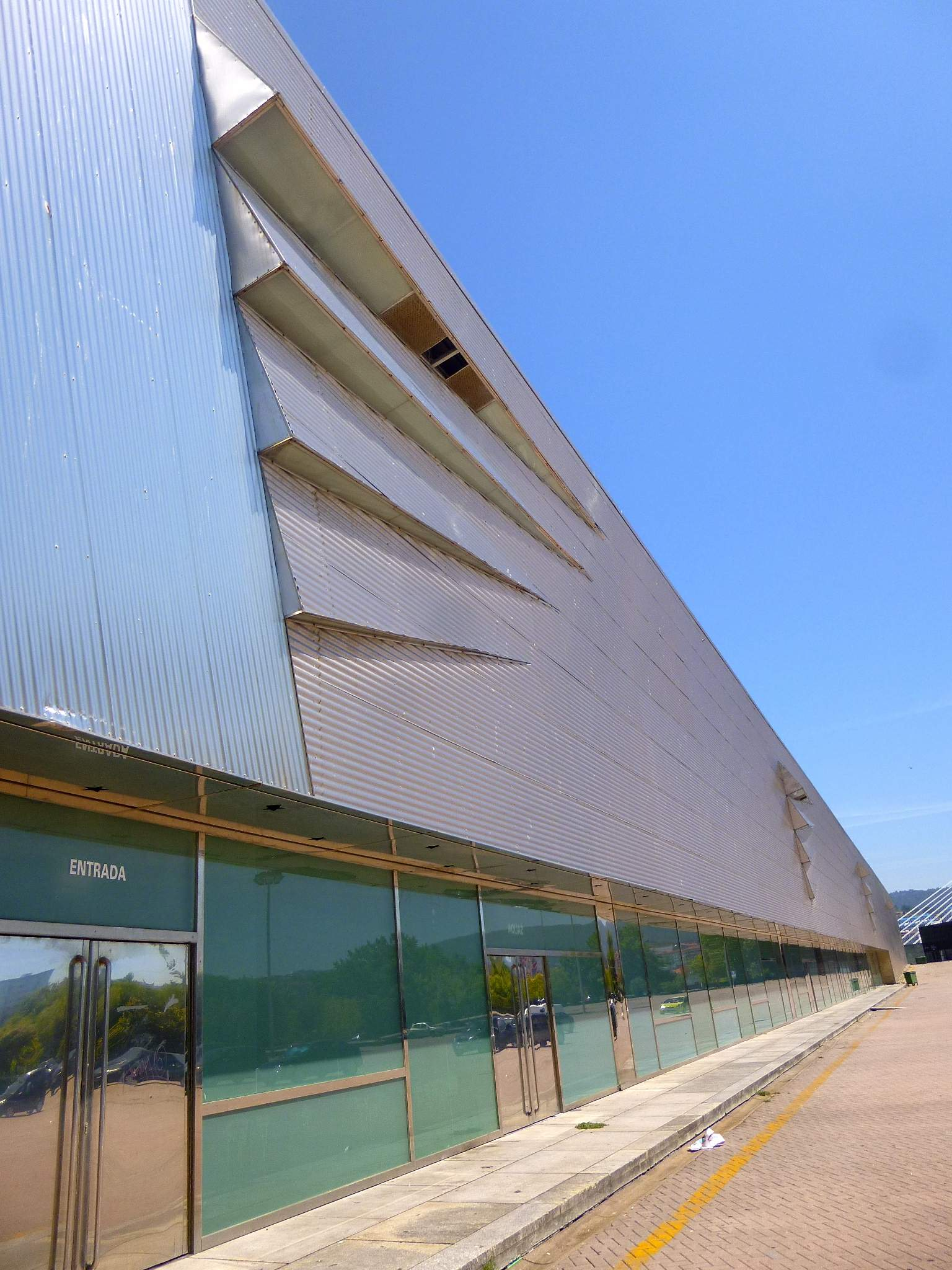
Entrance

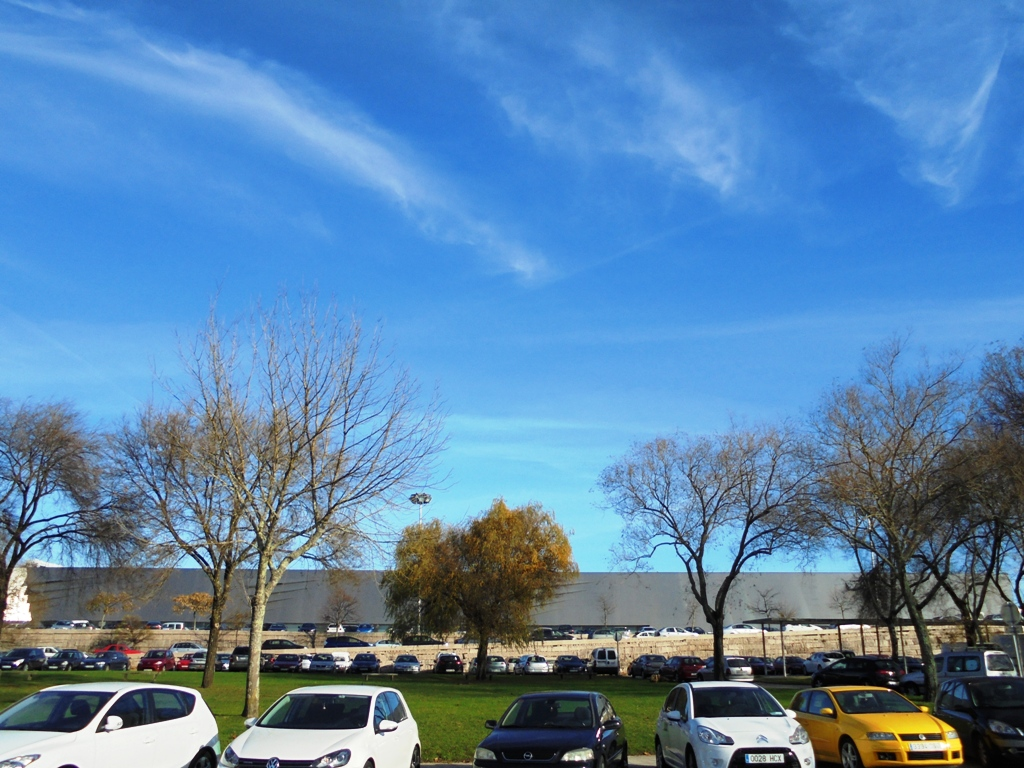
General view in the Rosalía de Castro Park

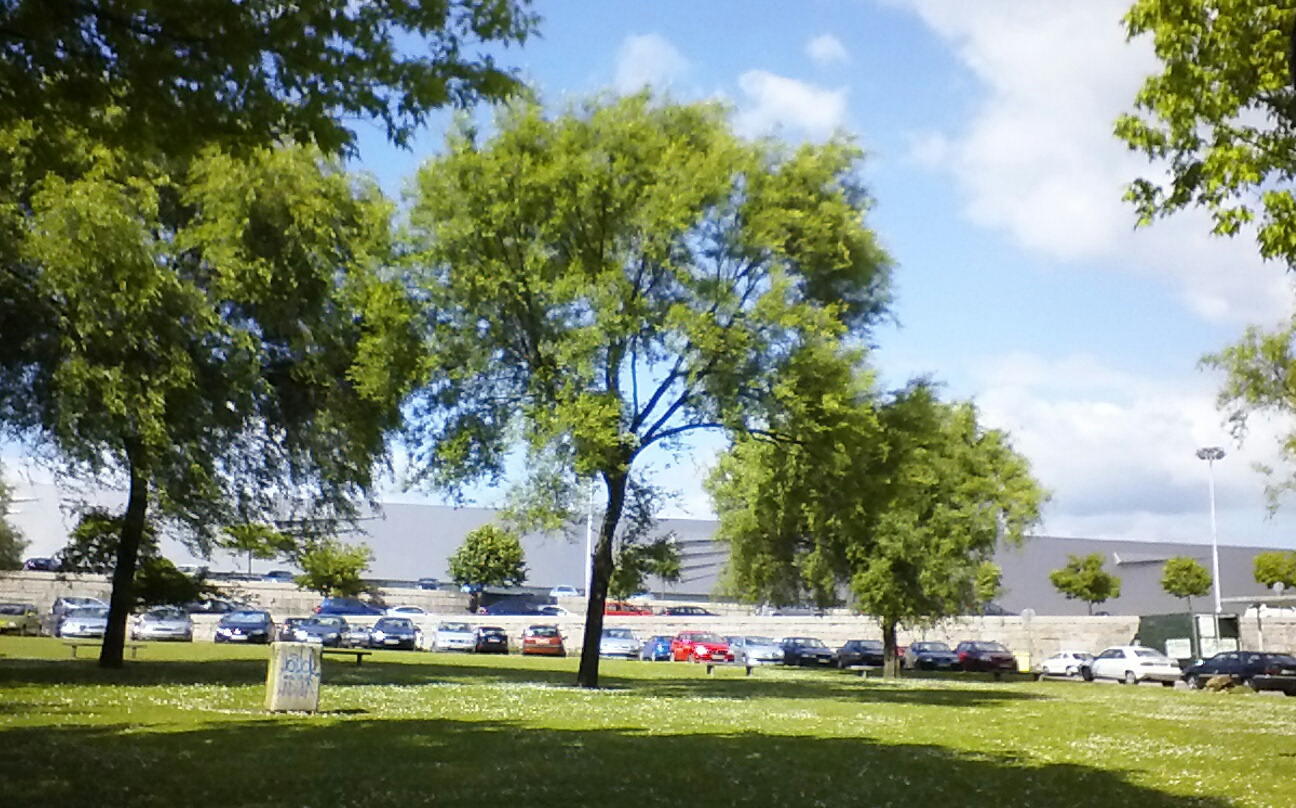
Main façade and Rosalía de Castro Park near the banks of the Lérez.

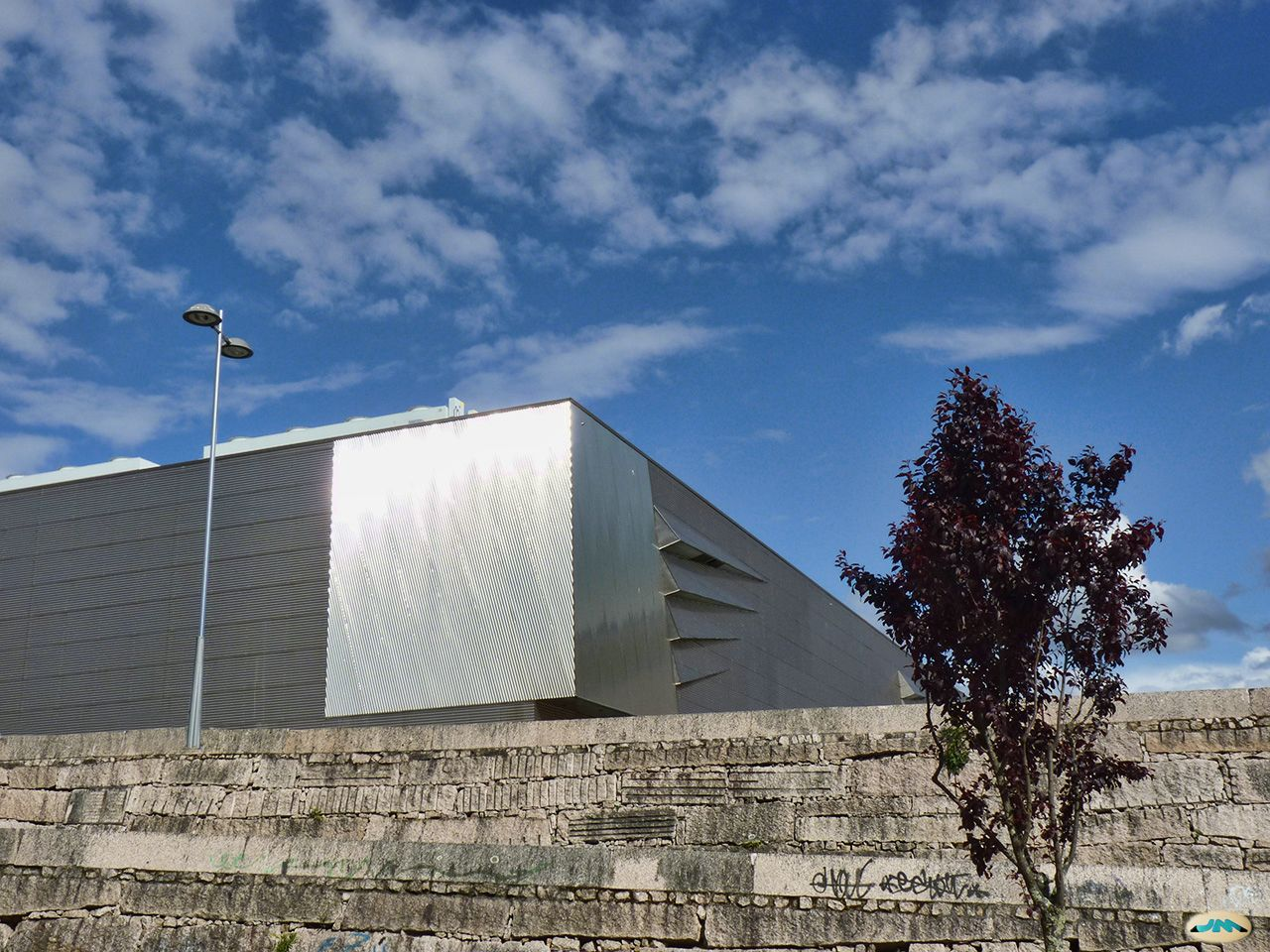
Side view

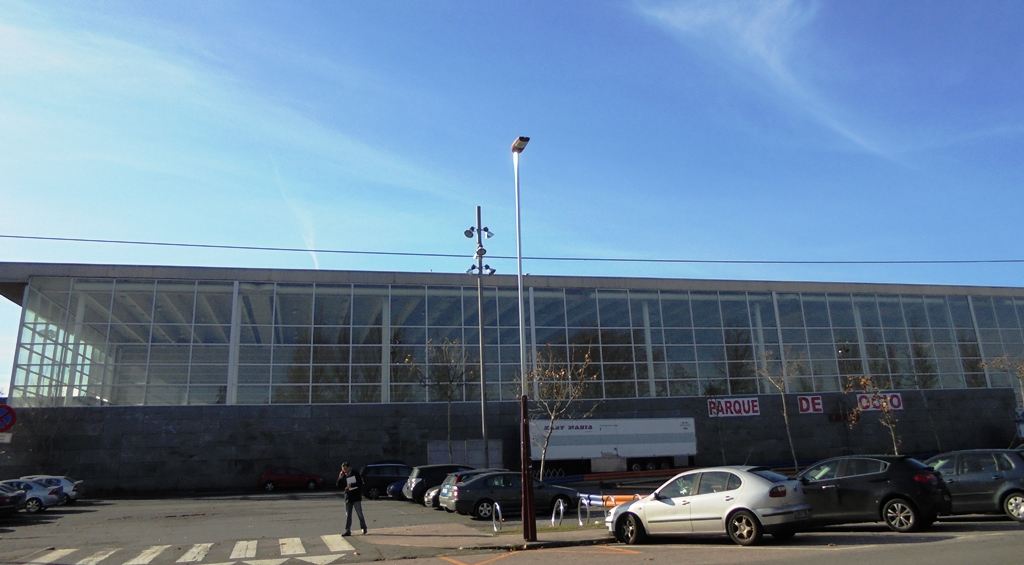
Back side

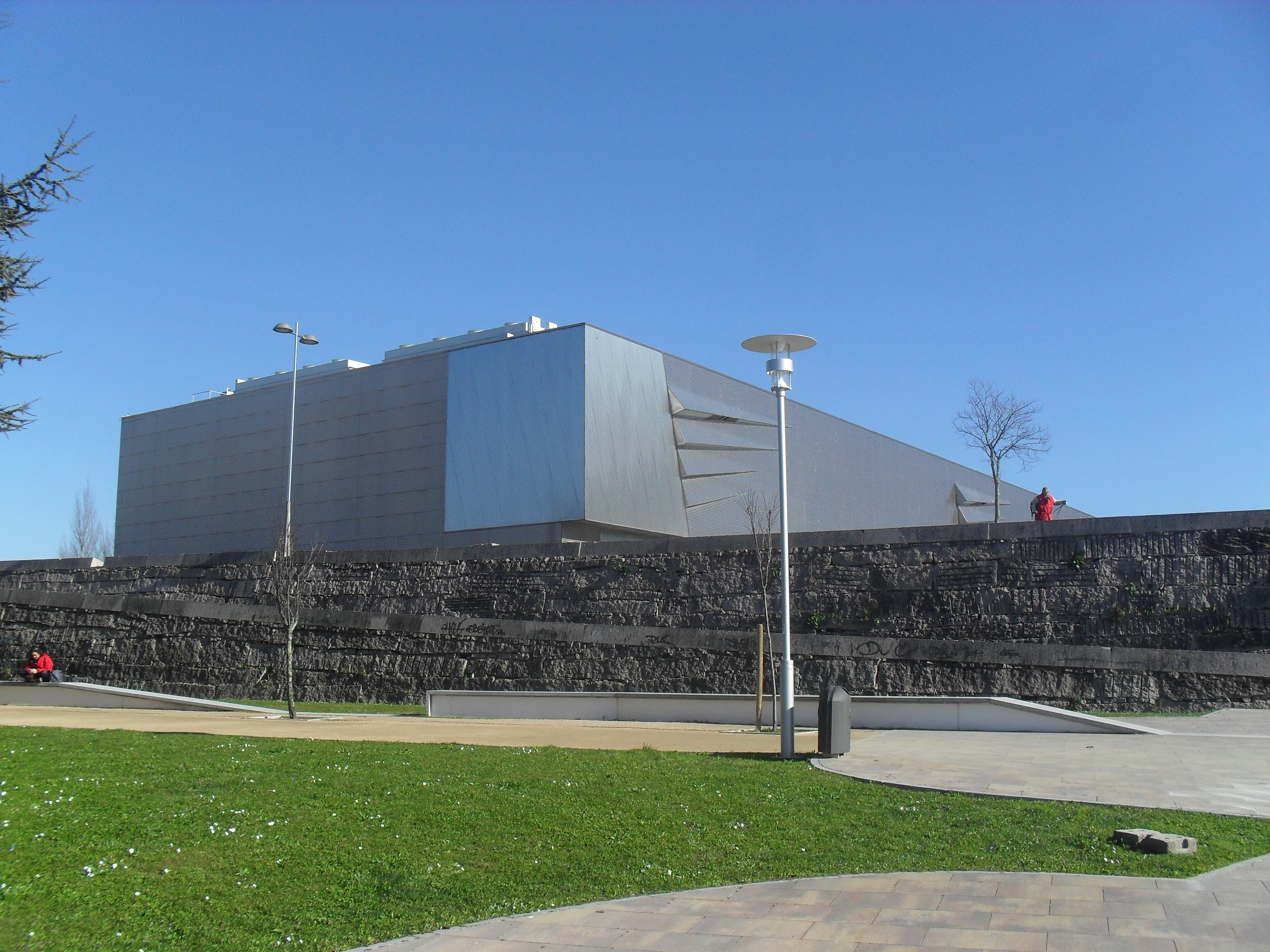
Side view

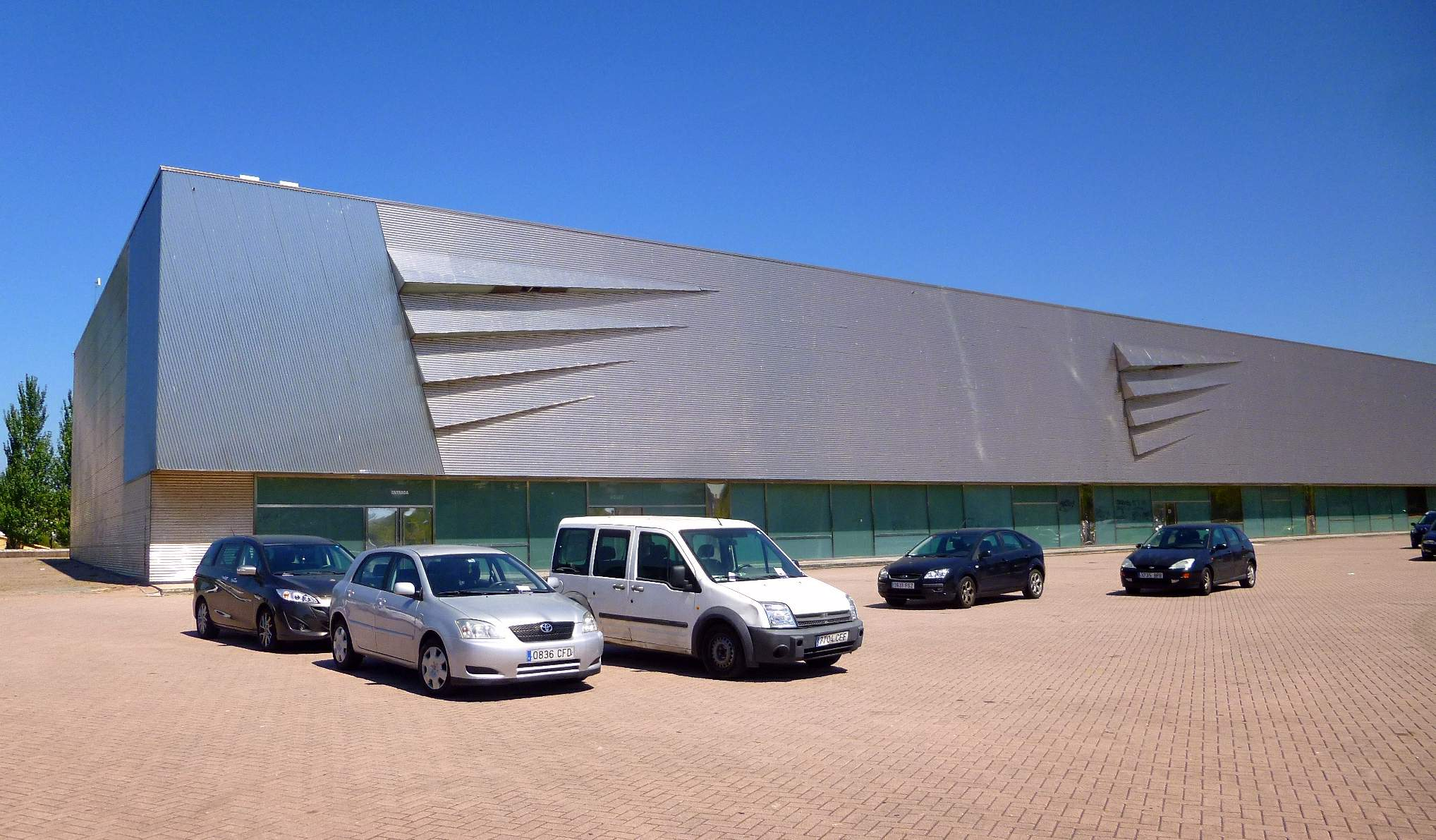
Façade

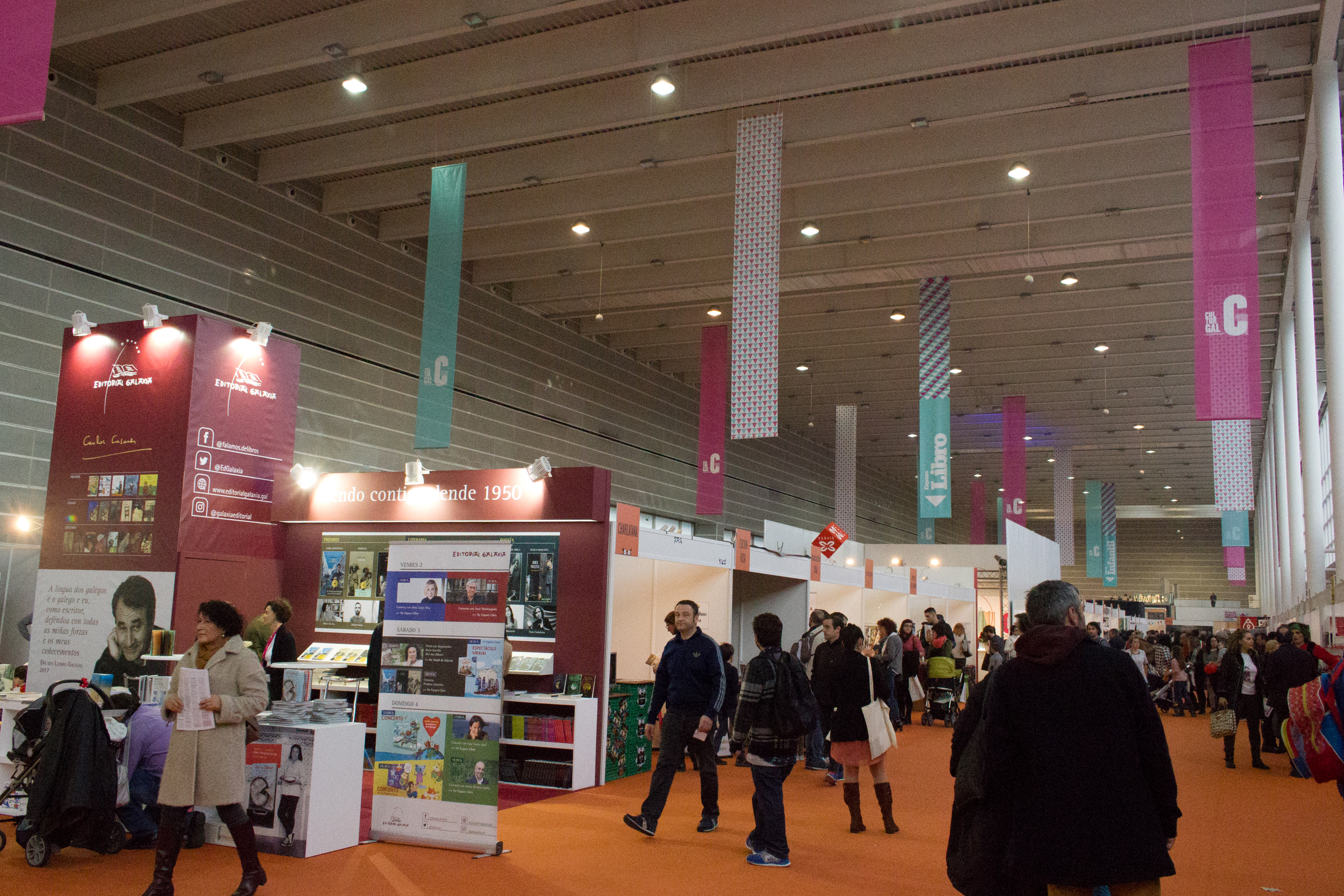
Culturgal in 2016

== See also ==
=== Bibliography ===
- Aganzo, Carlos (2010). Pontevedra. Ciudades con encanto (in Spanish). Madrid: El País-Aguilar. p. 106. ISBN 978-8403509344.
- Riveiro Tobío, Elvira (2008). Descubrir Pontevedra (in Spanish). Pontevedra: Edicións do Cumio. p. 69. ISBN 9788482890852.

=== Related articles ===
- Pontevedra Auditorium and Convention Centre
- Manuel de las Casas

=== External links ===
- Culturgal website
