= Pontevedra Viva =

Galician daily online newspaper

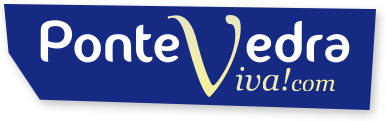
- Type: Daily newspaper
- Format: Online newspaper
- Owner: Virtual Vedra Comunicación S.L.
- Editor: Ramiro Espiño Castro
- Founded: 1 October 2012
- Language: Spanish; Galician
- Headquarters: Pontevedra, Spain
- Website: www.pontevedraviva.com

Pontevedra Viva is a Galician daily online newspaper founded in Pontevedra (Spain) in 2012.

It focuses on news related to the city of Pontevedra and the province of Pontevedra. It also deals with national and international issues.

The newspaper is published in Spanish and Galician. Its audience or number of readers is 207,399 in July 2022.

== See also ==
=== External links ===
- Website of the newspaper Pontevedra Viva
