= Gafos Park =

Park in Pontevedra (Spain)

Parque del Gafos
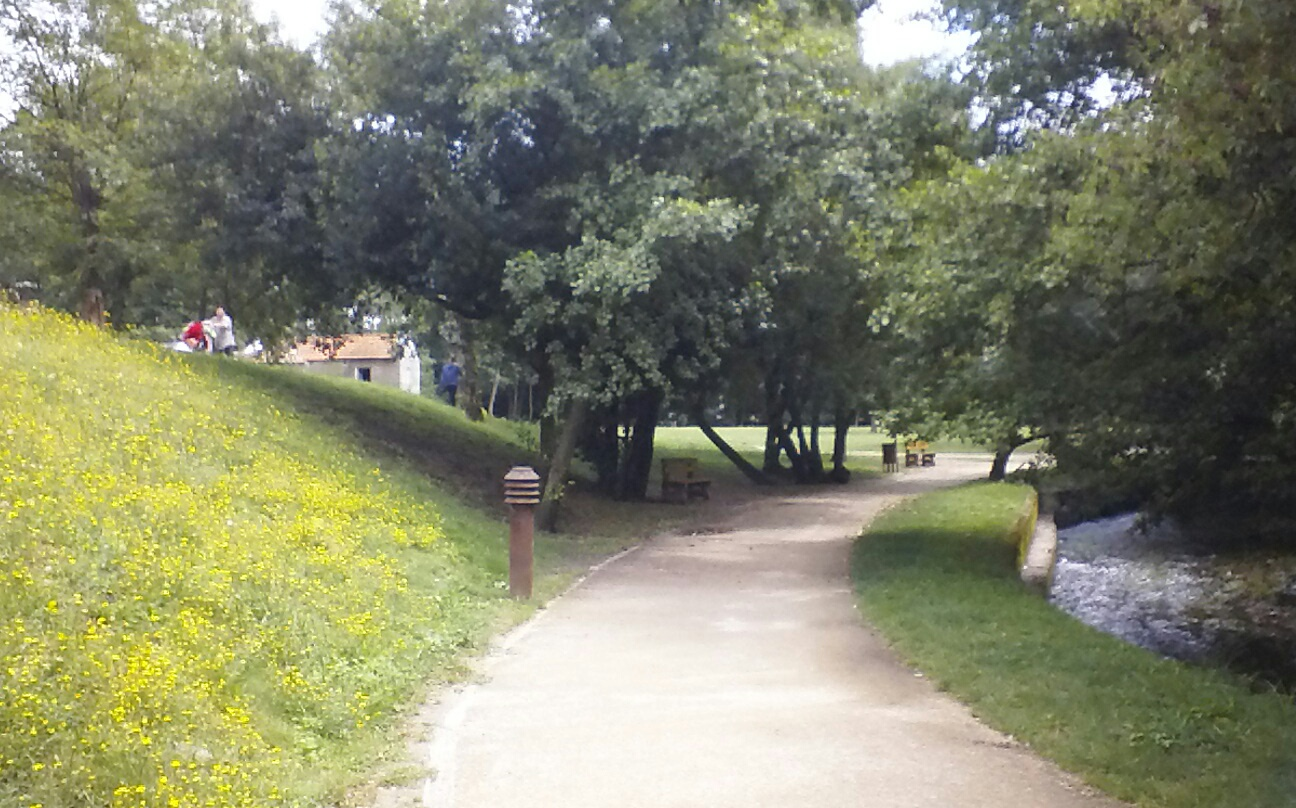
- Park path and LED landscape bollard light
- Interactive map of Parque del Gafos
- Location: Pontevedra, Spain
- Coordinates: 42.42408°N 8.63897°W
- Created: 2007
- Operator: Municipality of Pontevedra
- Status: Public park

The Gafos Park is a public park located in Pontevedra, Spain. It is a linear park surrounding the Gafos River, which runs through the south of the city from east to west.

== History ==
The crystal-clear waters of the Gafos River were the chosen place for washing clothes in the city since the 19th century, which is why there were five lavoirs. In 1970, the Gafos River was covered in the Campolongo district for a length of 500 metres, a tunnel was built to canalize its waters and a large promenade was created above it in December 1970. With the accelerated growth of the city, the degradation of the Gafos river and its banks during the last decades of the twentieth century, made the citizen conscience wake up for their care, being the most important association for their defense the Vaipolorío association, created in 2001.

From 2001 onwards, the idea of reclaiming the river banks was adopted resolutely. The Galician Government launched a recovery project for the creation of a park along its right bank as it passed through the city, which ended with the creation of a linear park inaugurated on 29 November 2007.

In 2019, the idea of uncovering the riverbed as it passes through the Campolongo district has been revived, which would allow the creation of an 81,000 square metre linear park around it. In March 2019, the Gafos River was declared a protected area, specifically a Natural Area of Local Interest (ENIL).

== Description ==
The park is 6.5 kilometres long and two kilometres in its urban part. The banks of the river have been transformed in some places into large recreational and rest areas.

The park has three well-defined areas from south to north :

- from the municipality of Vilaboa to the O Pino crossroads, at the city gates, the most natural section, where there are a few wooden footbridges or stone slabs to cross the river.
- the urban section from the O Pino crossroads to the Campolongo district. It is a gravel path with grass on one or two sides, with rusty iron LED landscape bollard lights, benches and wooden bridges. A footbridge and a wooden bridge make it easier for pedestrians to cross where the river is more inaccessible due to the encroachment of buildings on its banks The source of the Gorgullón is in this area. Festivals are also held in this section.
- from the Campolongo district to the mouth of the Pontevedra ria, the most modified section, there are some wooden footbridges and a bridge. In this part, there are several old mills for grinding grain.

In this linear park there is undergrowth (lichens, ferns, mosses, brambles), bushes and native trees (laurel, alder, willow, oak, ash, birch, poplar and chestnut). As for the fauna, the park has many birds such as warblers, swifts, cuckoos, swallows, tits, hoopoes, turtle doves, goldfinches and starlings.

== Gallery ==
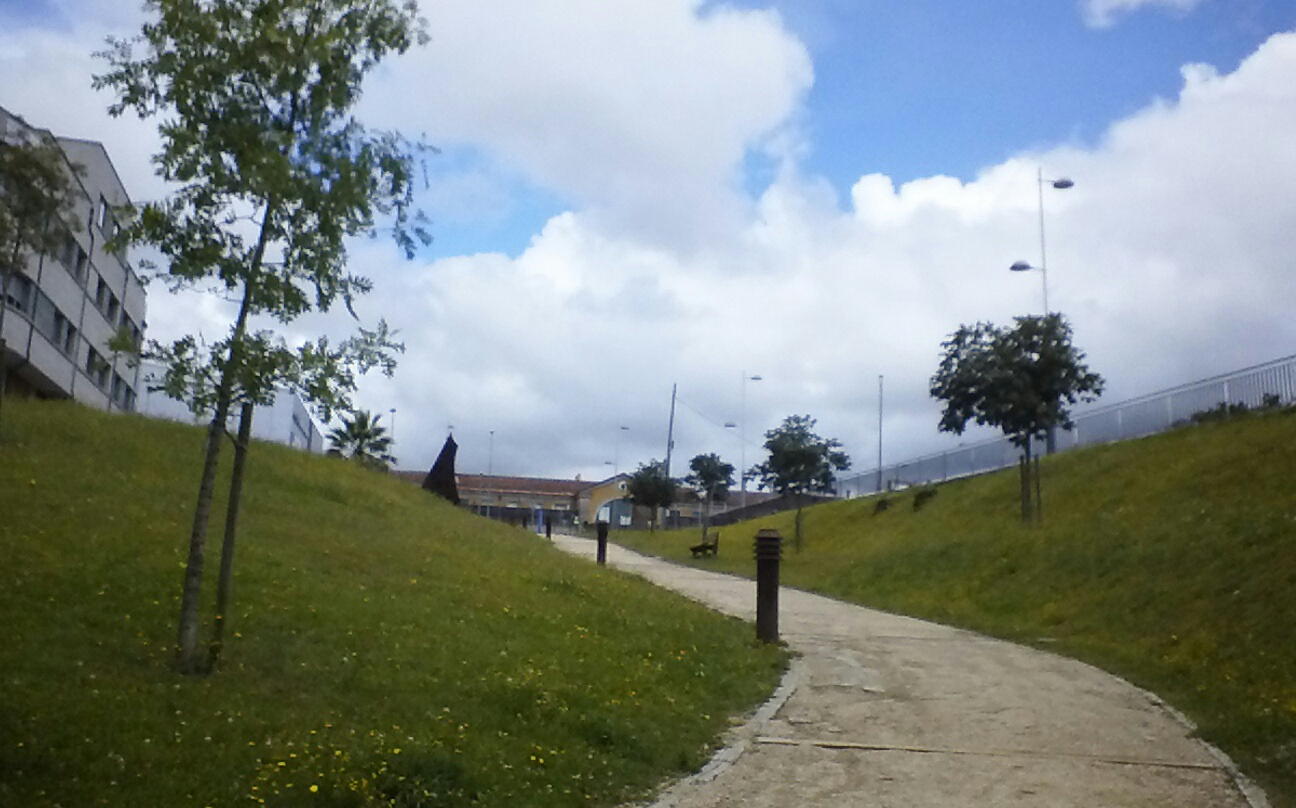
Park near the Vialia shopping centre

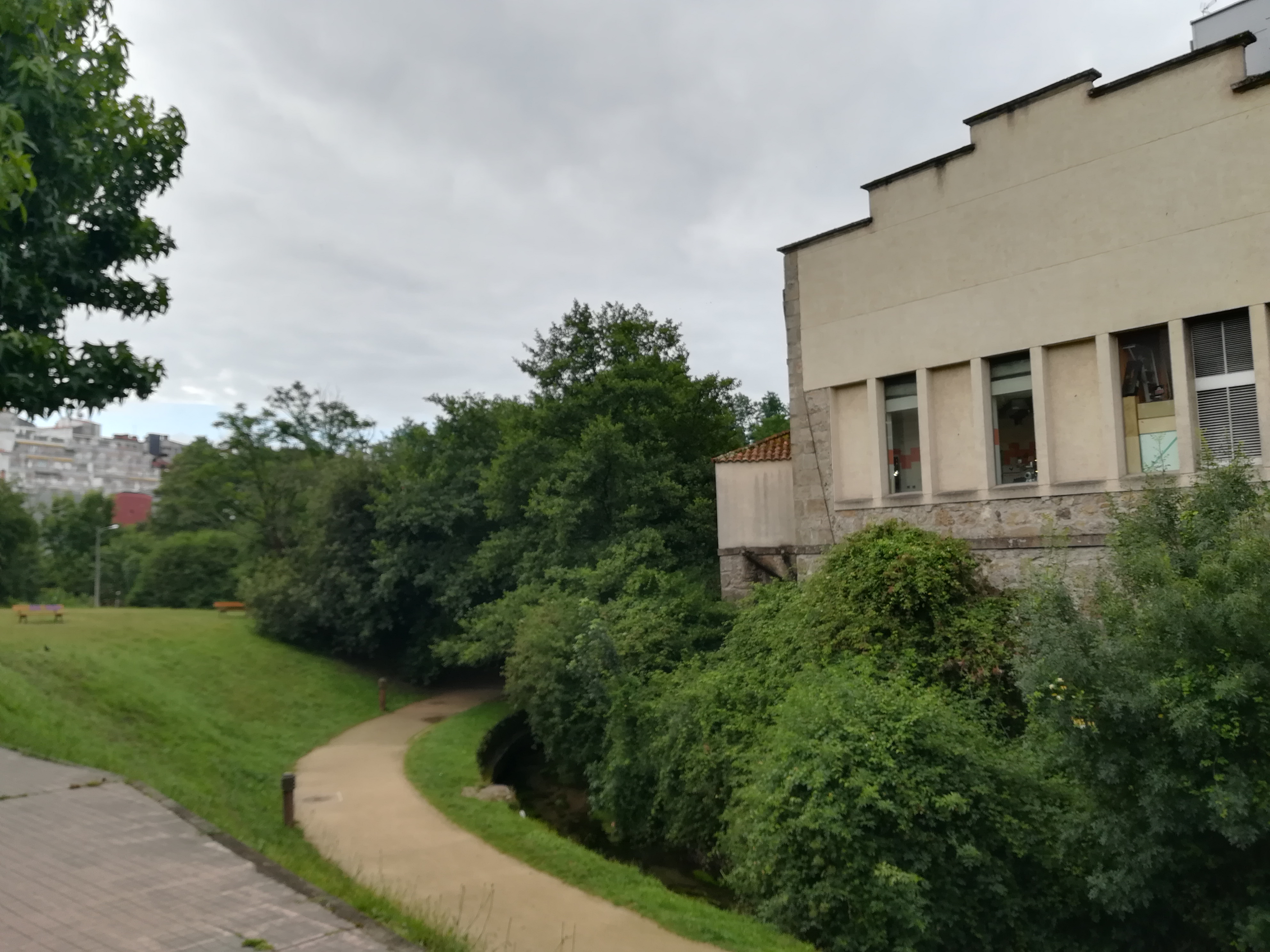

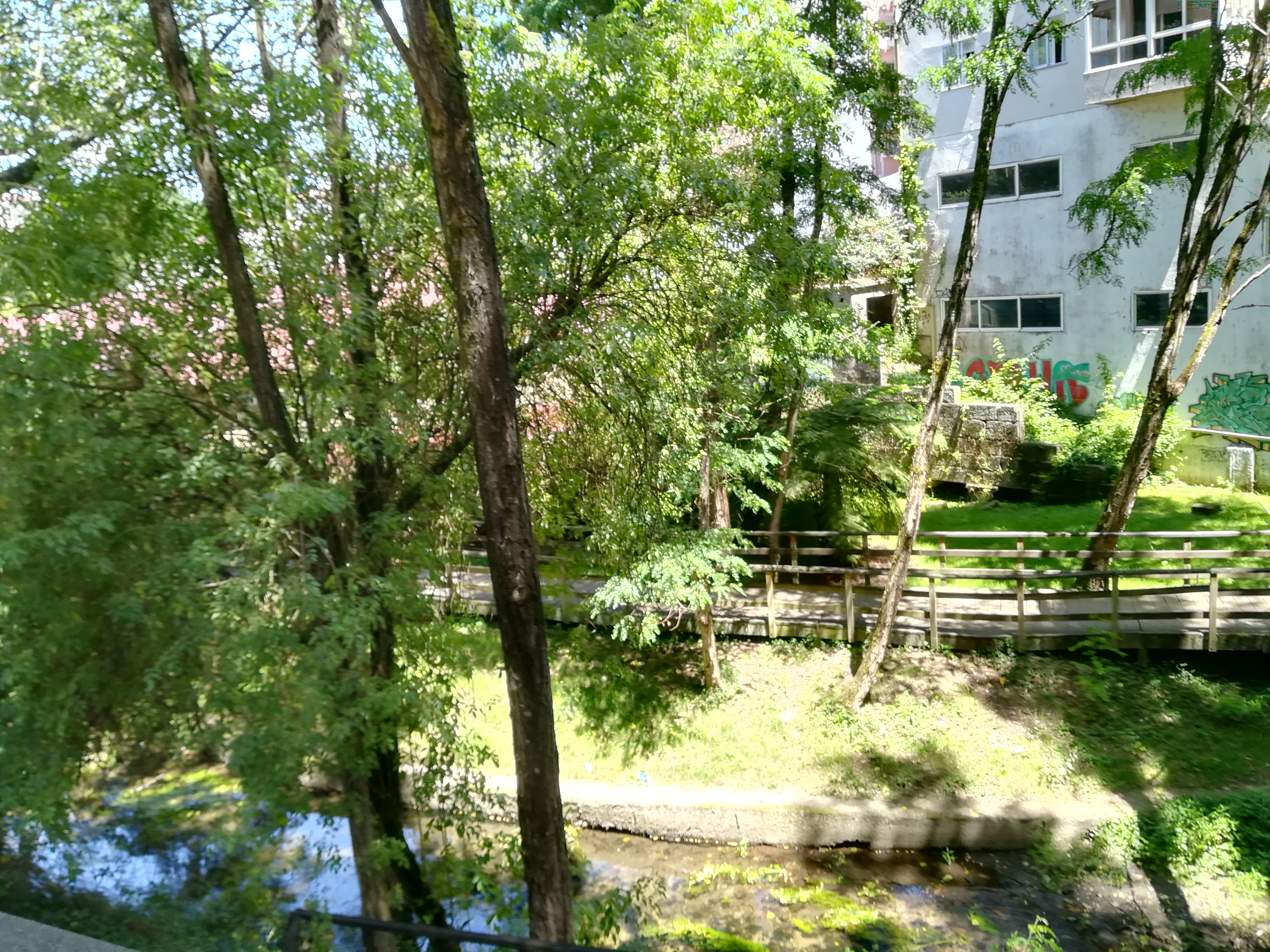

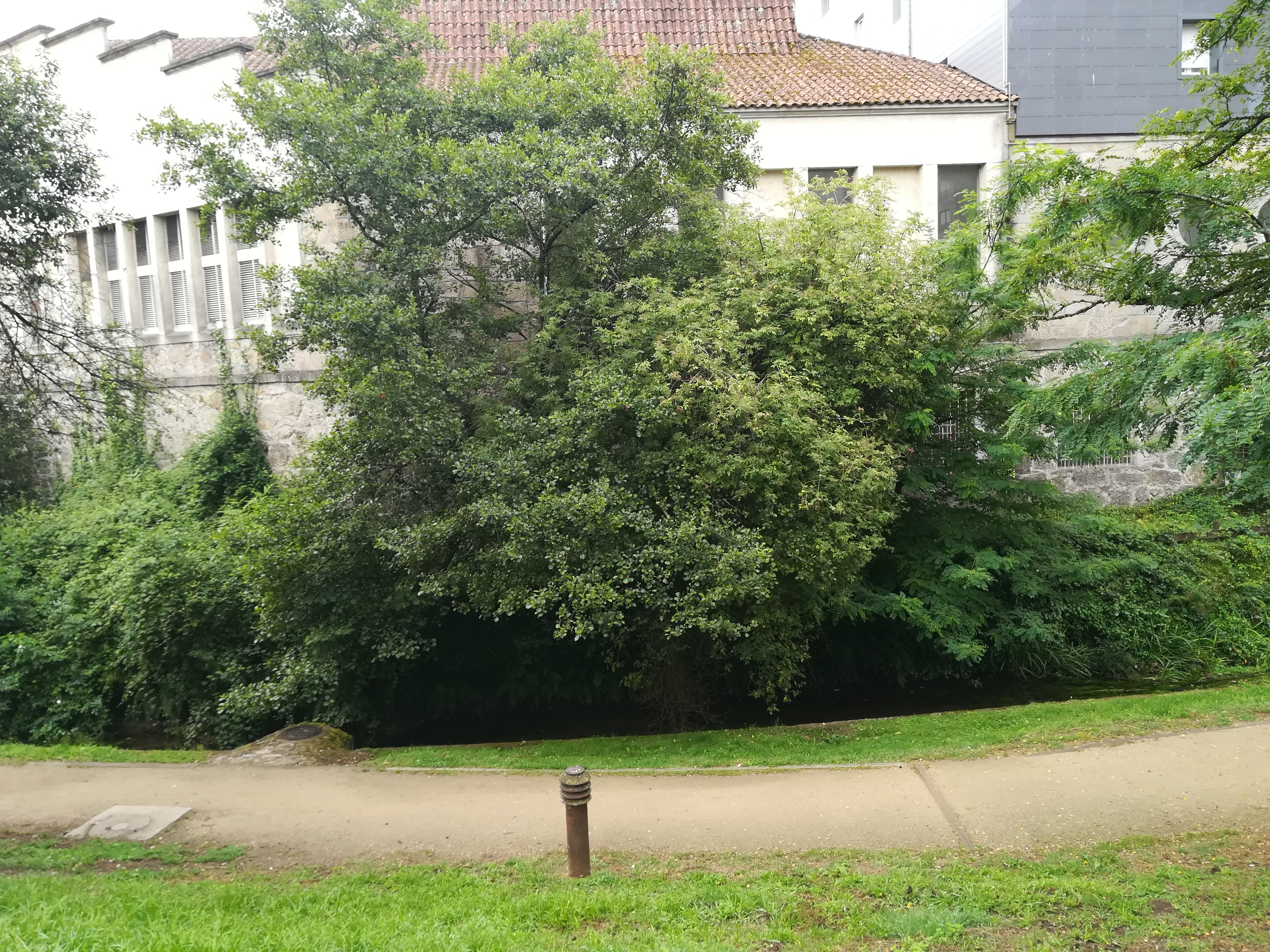

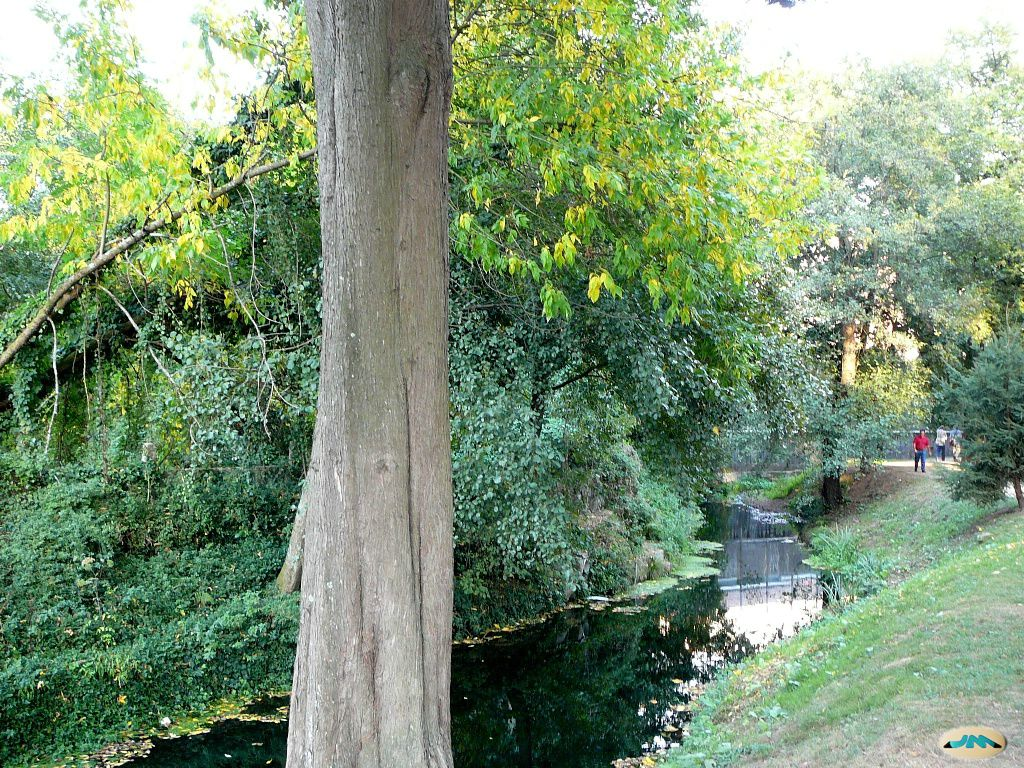

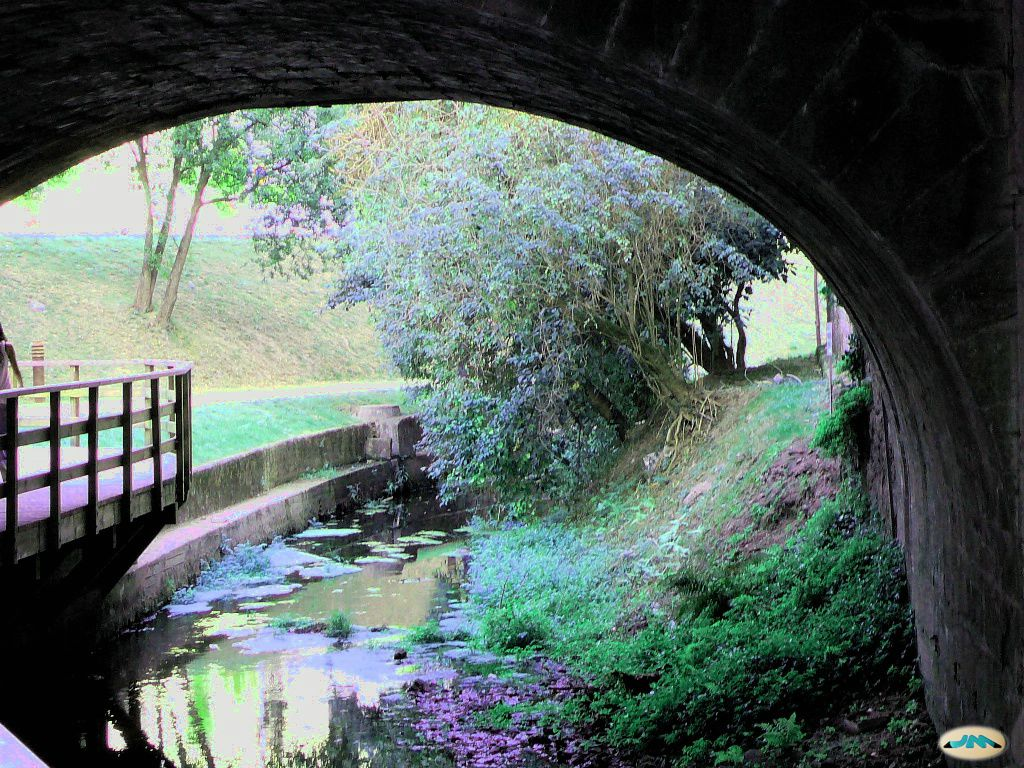
Puente Bolera

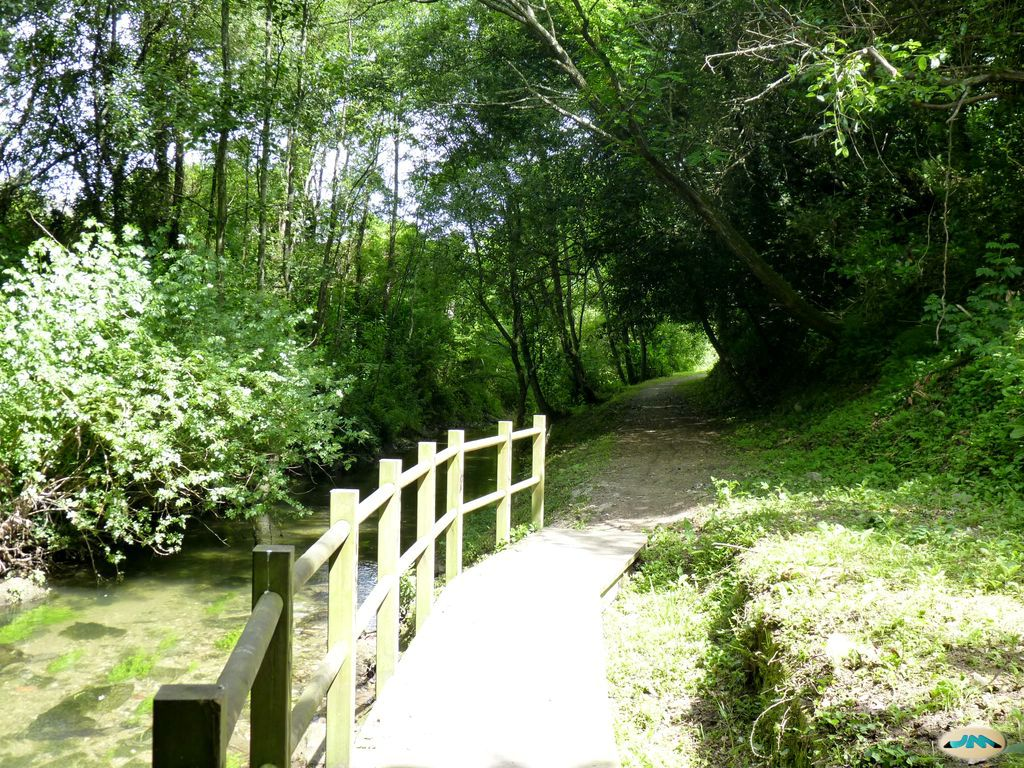
Path

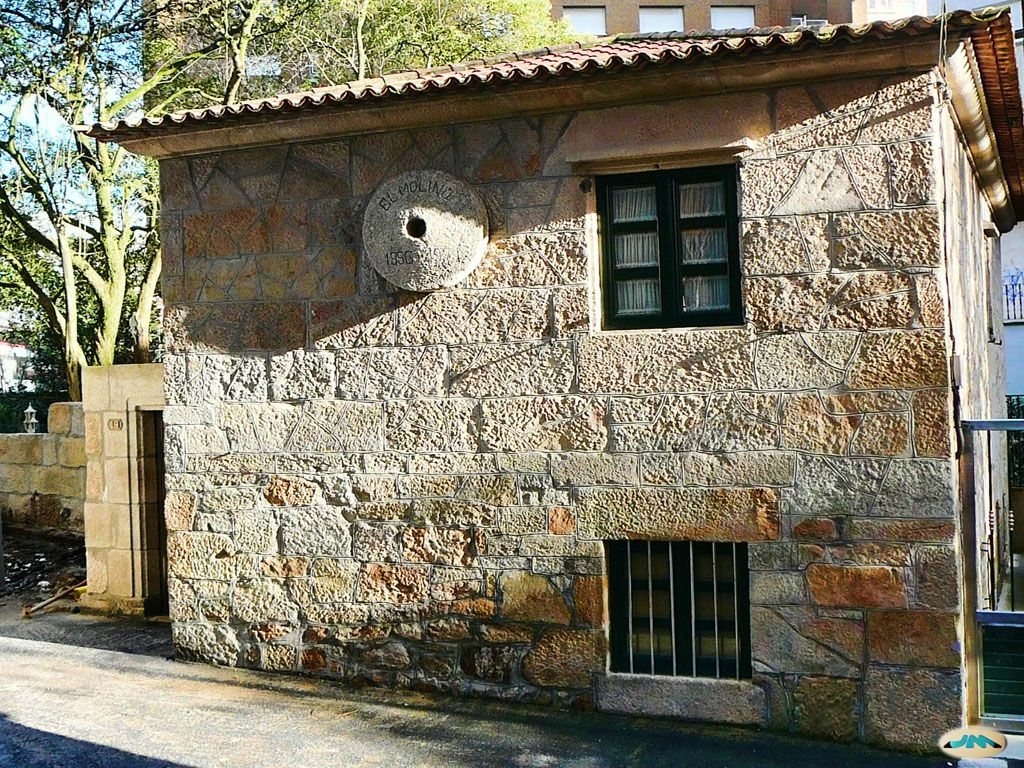
Old mill

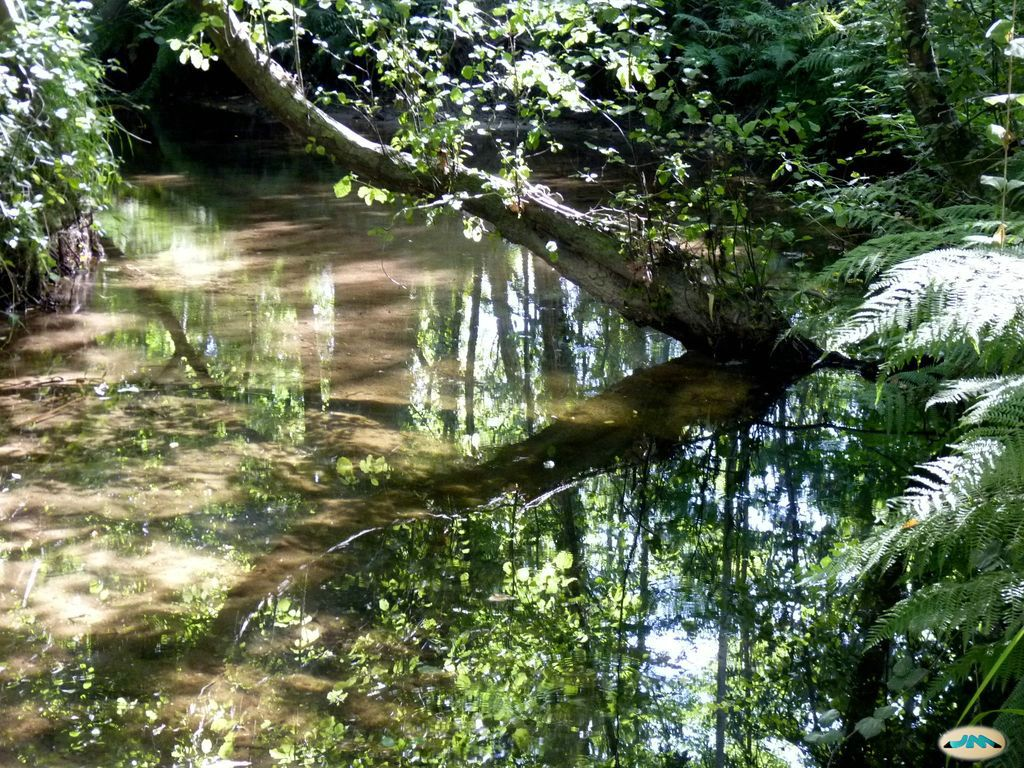

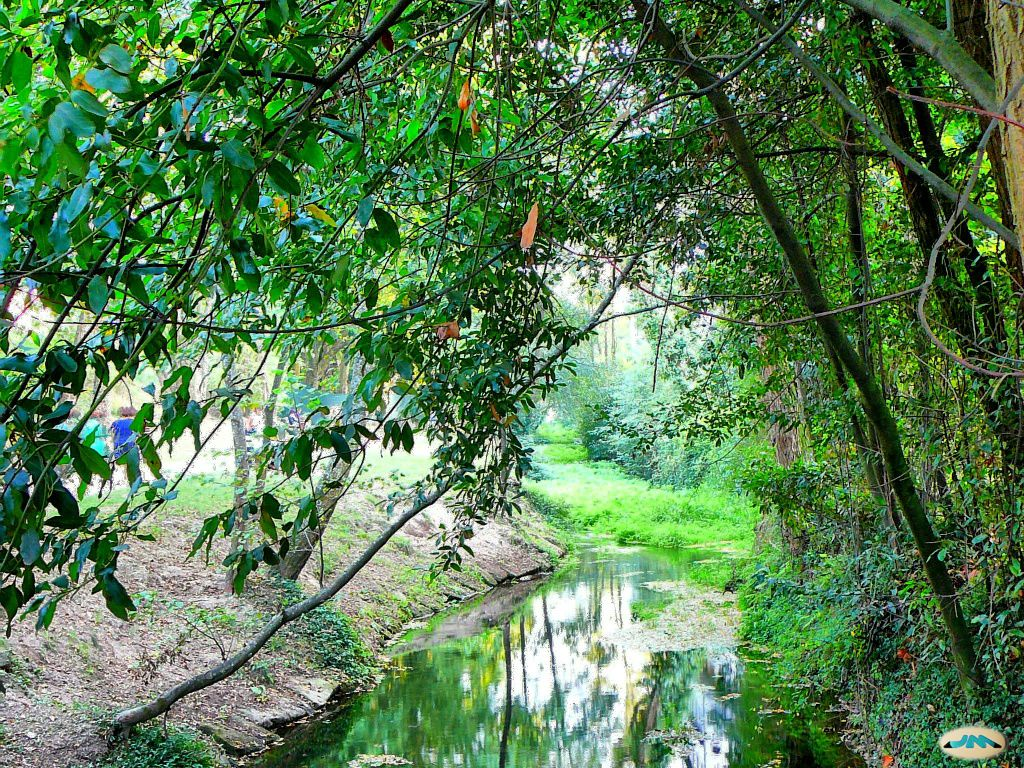

== See also ==
=== Bibliography ===
- Aganzo, Carlos (2010). Pontevedra. Ciudades con encanto (in Spanish). Madrid: El País-Aguilar. pp. 111–113. ISBN 978-84-03-50934-4.
- Riveiro Tobío, Elvira (2008). Descubrir Pontevedra (in Spanish). Pontevedra: Edicións do Cumio. pp. 78–79. ISBN 978-84-8289-085-2.

=== Related articles ===
- Island of Sculptures
- Marismas de Alba Natural Park
- Alameda de Pontevedra
- Palm Trees Park

=== External links ===
- Parque del Gafos, on the website Visit-Pontevedra
- Parque del Gafos, on the website Galicia Info
