= O Burgo (Pontevedra) =

Neighbourhood in Pontevedra, Spain

El Burgo O Burgo
- Neighbourhood of Pontevedra
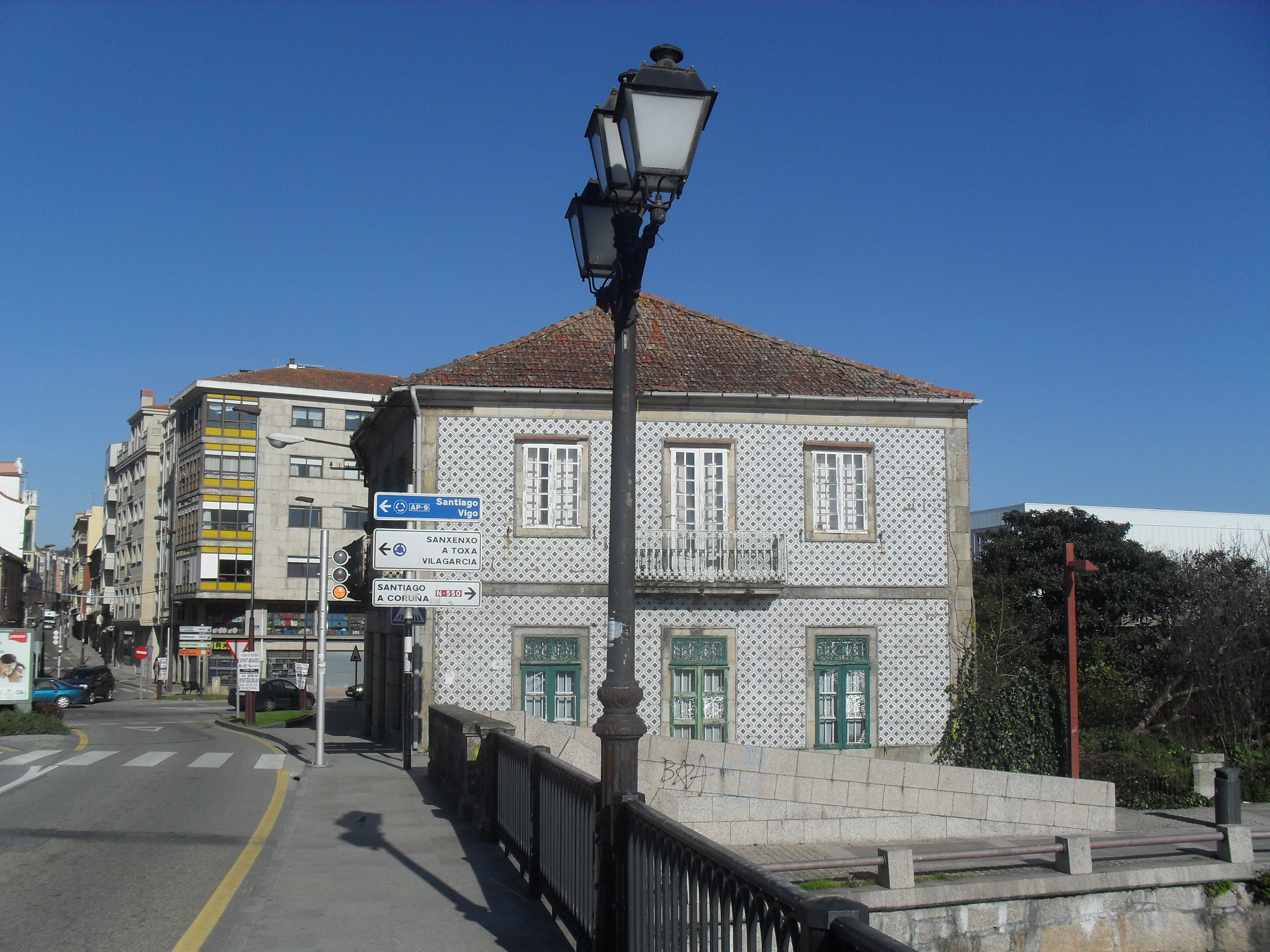
- La Coruña Avenue and Burgo Bridge
- Coordinates: 42°26′15.5″N 8°38′29.5″W
- Country: Spain
- City: Pontevedra
- Postal code: 36005

O Burgo (The Burg) is a neighbourhood in the city of Pontevedra (Spain). It is one of the oldest neighbourhoods in the city and is crossed by the Portuguese Way. On its right-hand side is the A Xunqueira area with important educational and cultural facilities.

== Location ==
O Burgo is a neighbourhood located in the north of the city on the right bank of the Lérez river. Its main axis is the A Coruña Avenue and the Juan Bautista Andrade Street, as well as Compostela Avenue to the right, which separates it from the A Xunqueira area. To the south, the district is bounded by Domingo Fontán Street.

== History ==
O Burgo, next to the bridge that bears its name and on the banks of the Lérez, has been a strategic point of Pontevedra since the Romans (the Via XIX passed through here), and since the Middle Ages one of the entrances to the city from the north, as well as a crossing point on the Portuguese Way.

In the 12th century, the Burgo bridge replaced the old Roman bridge, which was in ruins. The Burgo Pequeno was the first of the three suburbs of the city. The formation of this new, though small, settlement meant that the bridge served as a link between the city and the district, which became a sort of urban extension. The neighbourhood developed with the hermitage of San Jacobo or Santiago del Burgo as its centre. Its economy was based on wine-growing, supported by the presence of a mill in the 15th century, and by its proximity to and relationship with the monastery of Saint Saviour of Lérez.

In the Middle Ages, O Burgo became an obligatory stop for pilgrims on their way to Santiago de Compostela from Portugal. According to legend, the Apostle James, on his pilgrimage to Santiago de Compostela, felt tired and stopped at O Burgo, where he was cared for and sheltered until he recovered and could continue his journey. In gratitude for the help he received, the saint told the owners of the house where he was resting that the first grapes and corn of each harvest would ripen there every year.

At the end of the 18th century, the linear suburb of O Burgo, of medieval origin, began to take on a certain importance. On 16 December 1811, Xoan Manuel Pintos, a writer and lexicographer and one of the authors of the Galician Rexurdimento, was born in O Burgo. In 1898, the neighbourhood grew with the construction of a road between O Burgo and A Caeira.

The O Burgo sports ground was inaugurated on 16 October 1919 with a football match between Pontevedra Athletic and Real Coruña. The ground became the city's multi-sport venue par excellence. In 1949 the road known as Camino de Santiago or Camino del Burgo was called Avenida de La Coruña. In 1960, the City Council bought the stadium, which became the current Pasarón Stadium. On 13 July 1968, the Pontevedra Municipal Sports Hall was inaugurated in the area.

On 10 September 1983, the Santiago Bridge was inaugurated to relieve congestion on the Burgo Bridge and provide new access to the city centre.

In September 1986, the old Burg chapel was demolished and in April 1987, the construction of a new chapel that integrated the façade of the old building began.

On 3 July 1987, the four-lane Compostela avenue was inaugurated, providing a new exit to the city from the north towards Santiago de Compostela and A Coruña. In 1993, land north of A Xunqueira was developed for the Pontevedra campus. On 26 May 1995, a new bridge was inaugurated to connect this part of the city to the left bank of the river, the Tirantes Bridge.

In 1996, the parish of Santiago del Burgo was created in the district.

The summer of 2020 saw the inauguration of the pedestrianisation of the Burgo Bridge, which improved the neighbourhood's connection with the city centre.

== Urban planning ==
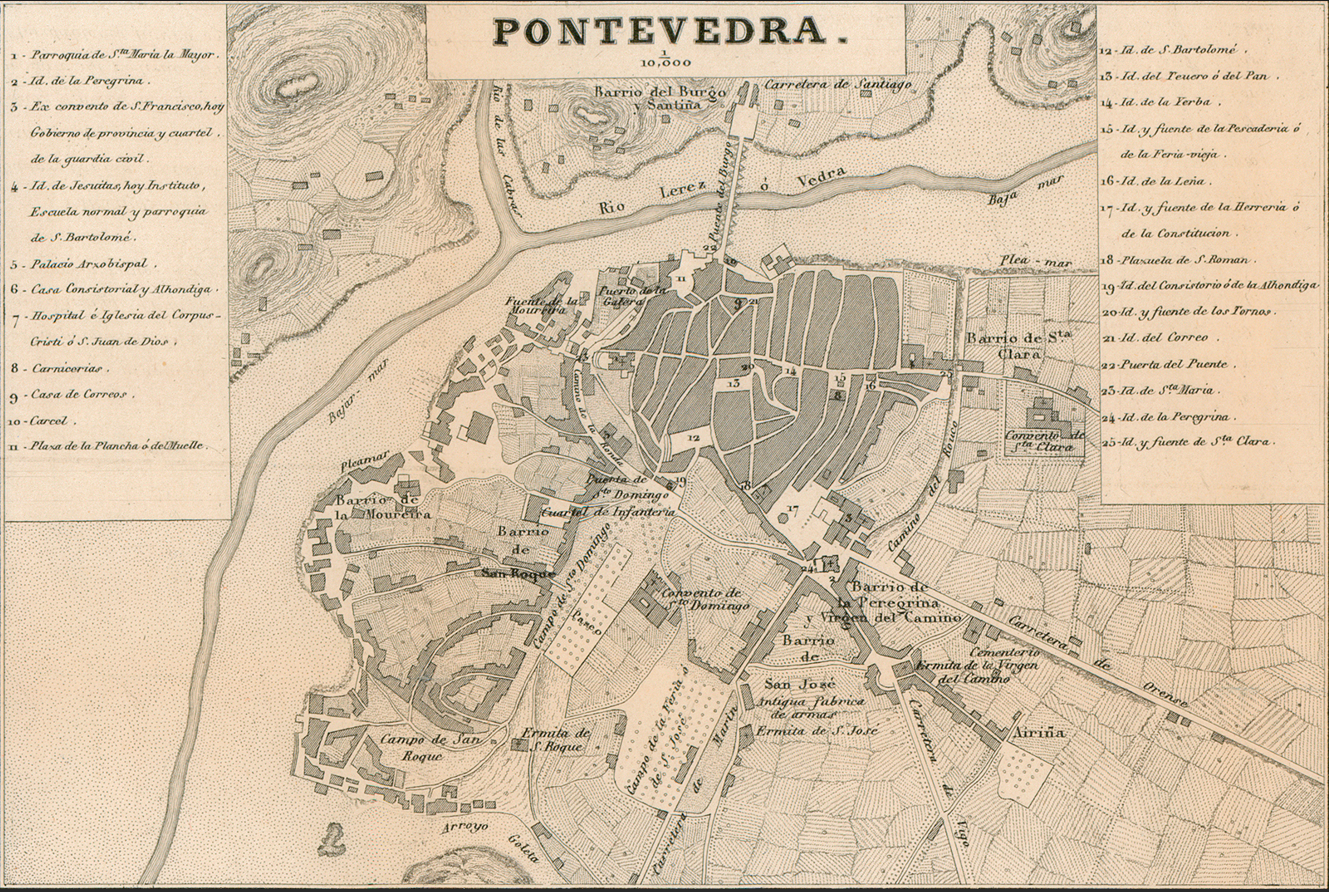
Map of Pontevedra in 1856 with the Burgo neighbourhood in the north of the city.

O Burgo is the Pontevedrian district located on the right bank of the Lérez river. It is organised longitudinally from the Burgo bridge, along A Coruña Avenue and Juan Bautista Andrade Street. Domingo Fontán Street runs along the banks of the Lérez and the Portuguese Way runs along Santiña Street. To the east, Compostela Avenue separates the O Burgo neighbourhood from the A Xunqueira area, which is linked to the Tirantes Bridge by Alexandre Bóveda Street.

Opposite the Pasarón stadium is the Pasarón Park and to the west the Marismas de Alba Natural Park. At the back of the Pontevedra Municipal Sports Hall there is a petanque court. In the A Xunqueira area, there is the Rosalía de Castro Park and the Island of Sculptures Park, one of the largest in the city.

At number 20, Coruña Avenue, is the Sanz Díaz House, an Art Nouveau building by the architect Antonio López Hernández.

== Facilities ==
=== Sports and leisure ===
O Burgo has the most important sports facilities in the city:

- Pasarón Stadium: inaugurated in 1965, it was completely renovated in 2006.
- The Pontevedra Municipal Sports Hall: inaugurated in 1968, it was designed by the architect Alejandro de la Sota.
- In the A Xunqueira area, there are several football pitches (one of which is artificial turf), and a multipurpose sports pavilion.

=== Schools ===
The A Xunqueira area has important educational infrastructures and it is here that most of the city's educational offer is concentrated. In this sector are located:

- two schools: A Xunqueira 1 and A Xunqueira 2.
- two secondary schools: A Xunqueira 1 and A Xunqueira 2.
- an integrated vocational training centre.
- the city's Official School of Languages.
- the Teacher Training Centre of the Xunta de Galicia.
- the A Xunqueira campus, with 4 faculties, 1 engineering school and a crèche of the Xunta de Galicia.

=== Other facilities ===
To the west, next to the Marismas de Alba natural park, is the examination room of the Provincial Road Department, in Martín Códax Street. O Burgo also has a community centre for the residents of the neighbourhood. There is a parish church in the neighbourhood: Saint-James Pilgrim of the Burg.

In A Xunqueira area there are important cultural facilities: the Pontevedra Congress Centre and the Pontevedra Exhibition Centre.

== Festivities and cultural events ==
The neighbourhood festivities take place every year around 25 July, as well as the traditional offering of grapes and corn to the Apostle James.

== Gallery ==
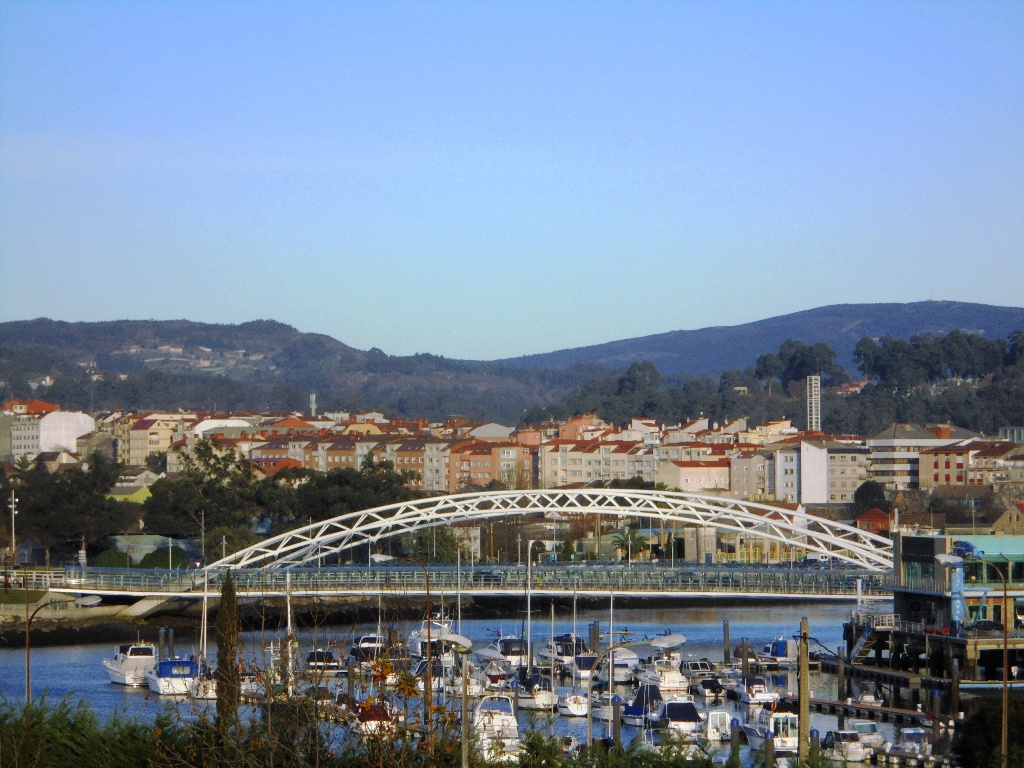
O Burgo, the Currents Bridge and the Pontevedra marina

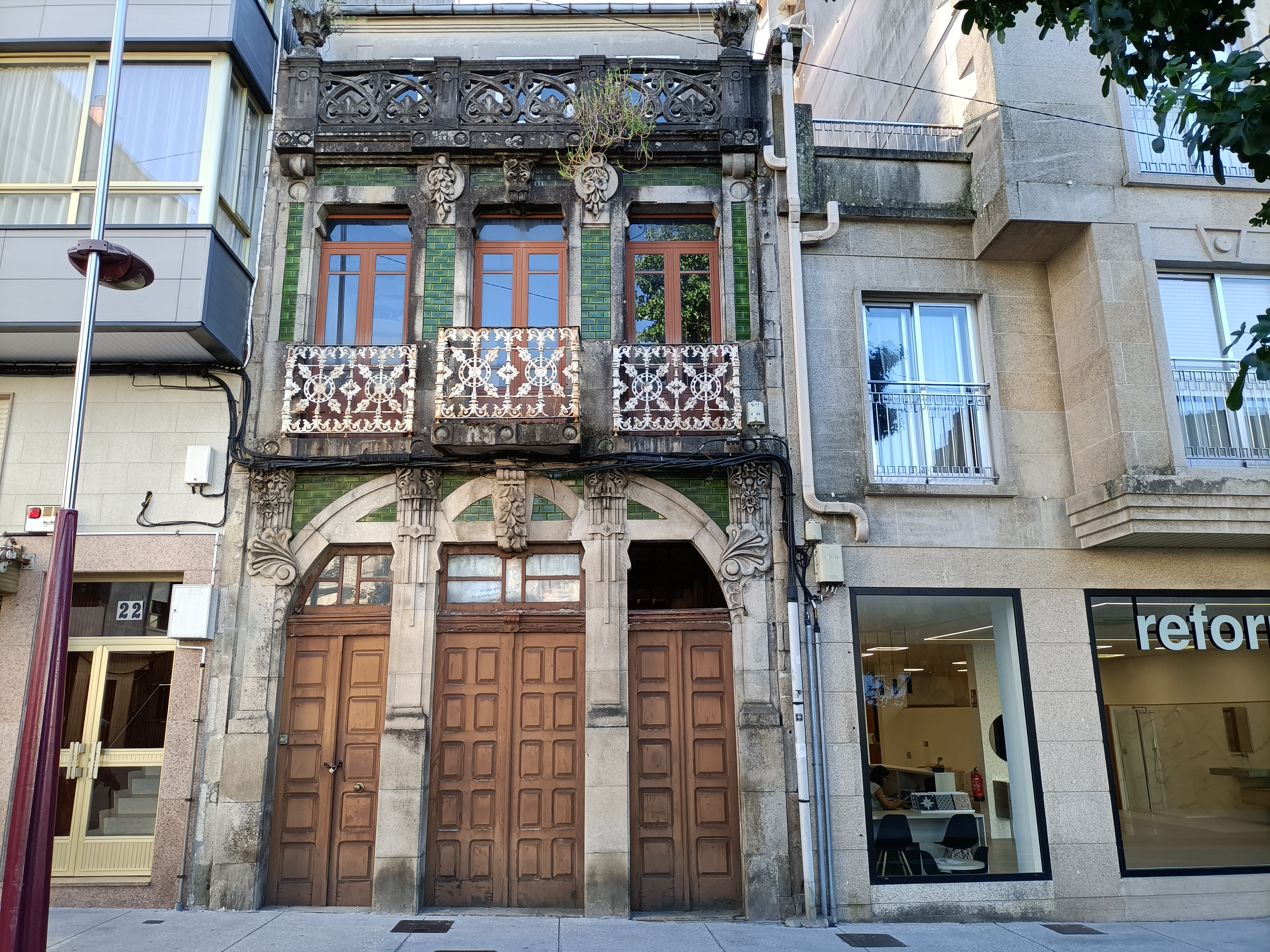
Art Nouveau Sanz Díaz House

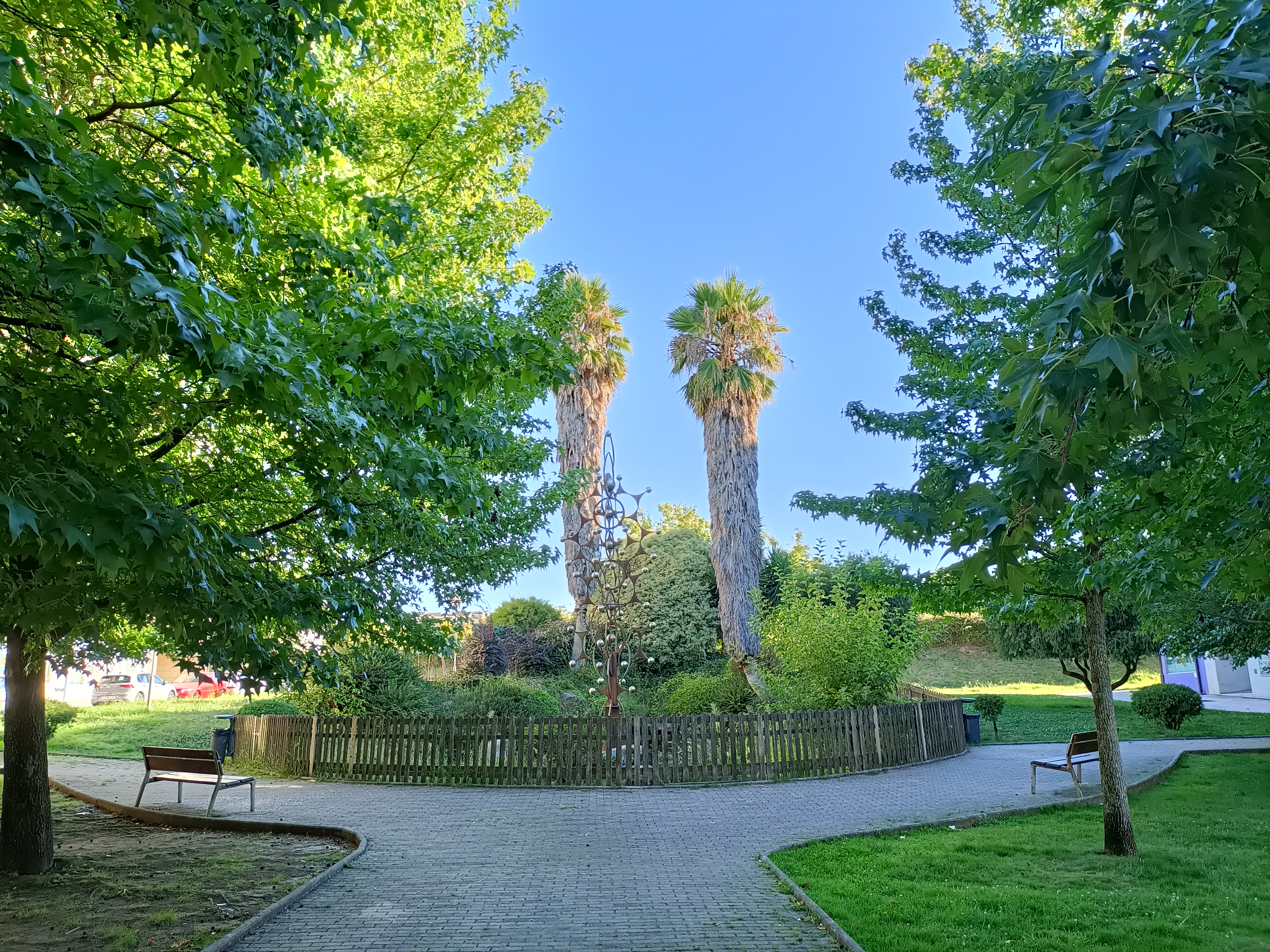
Pasarón Park

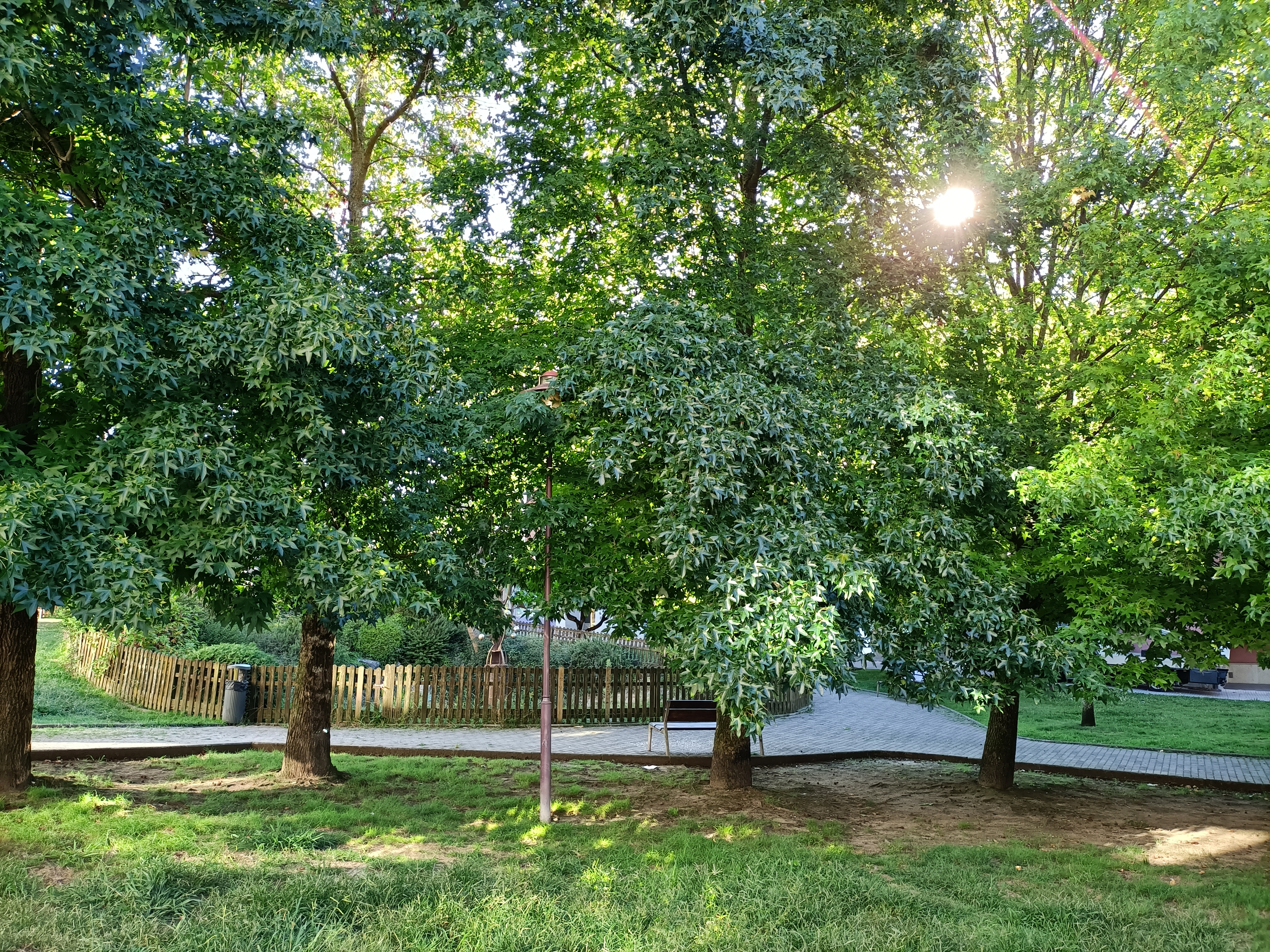
Pasarón Park

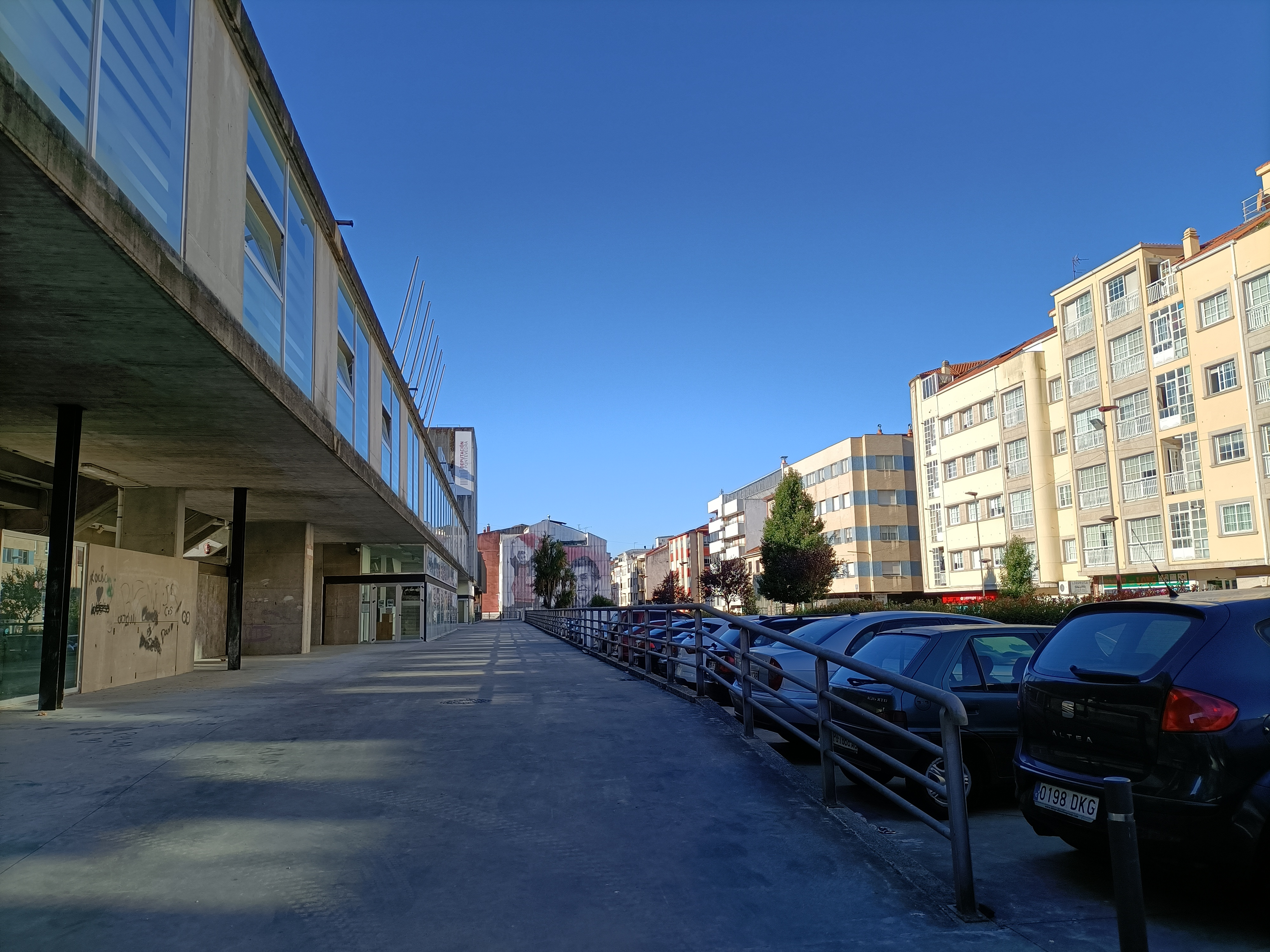
A Coruña Avenue and Pasarón Stadium

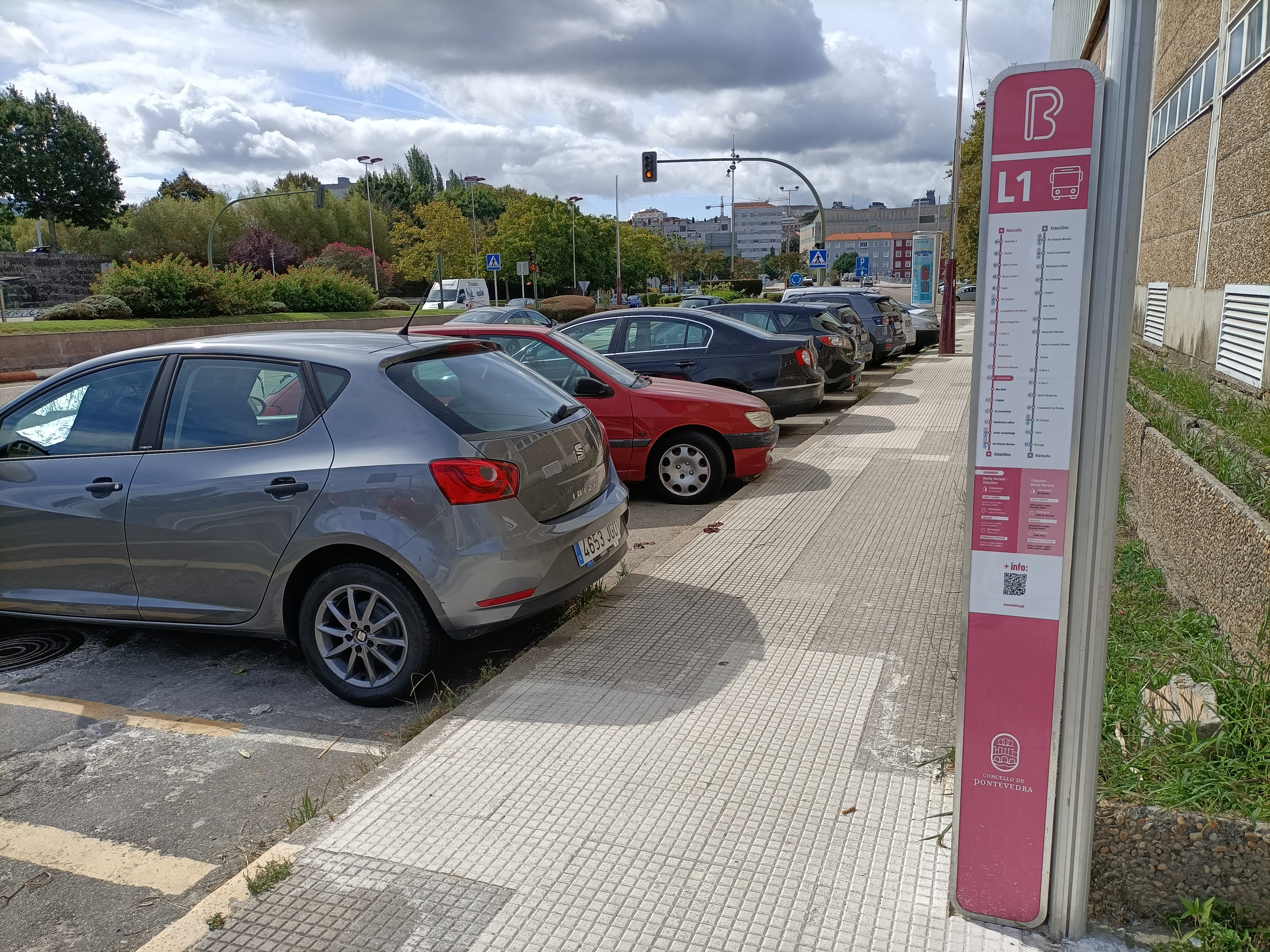
Bus stop of the line 1 of the city buses

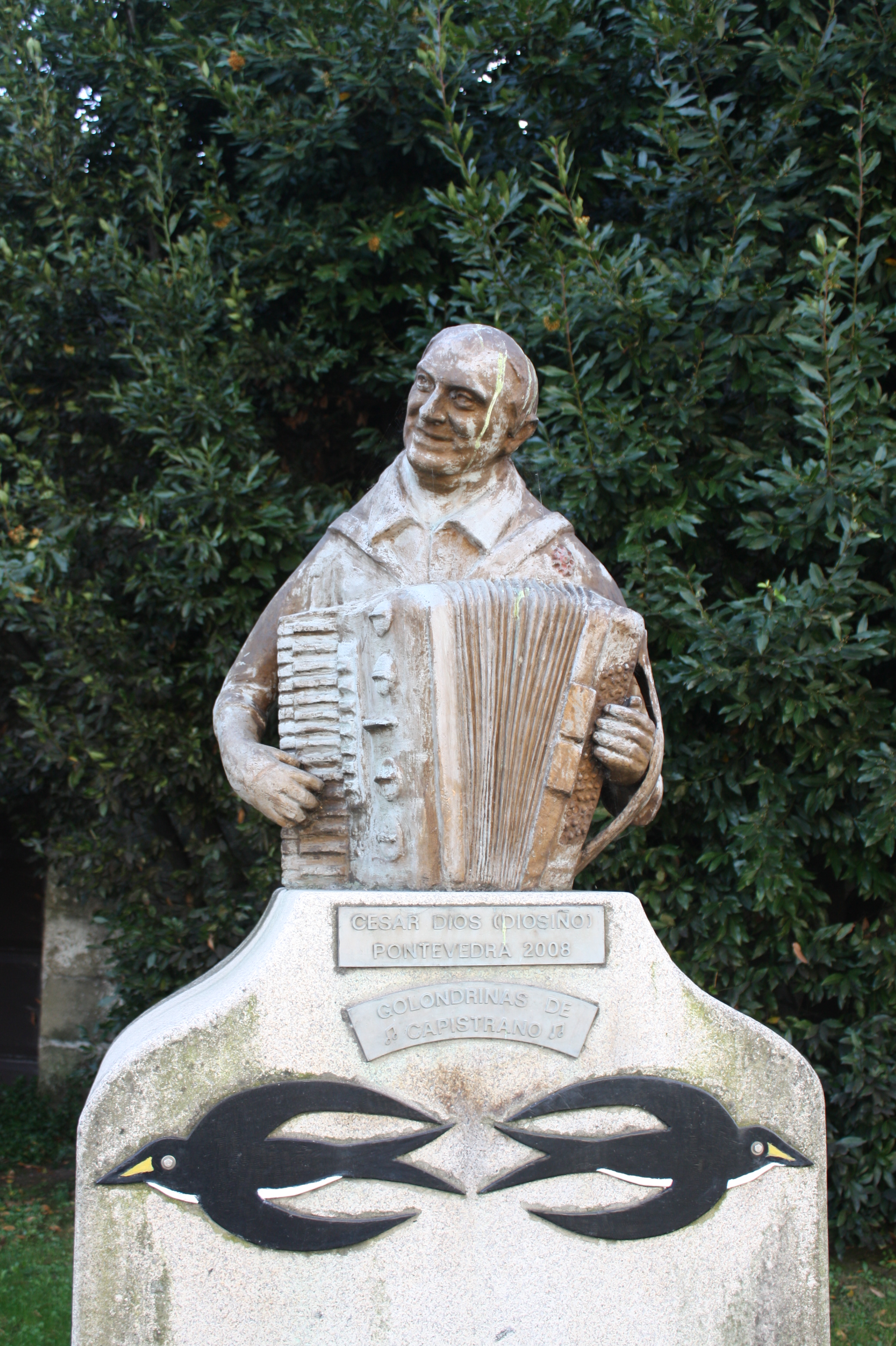
Diosiño bust

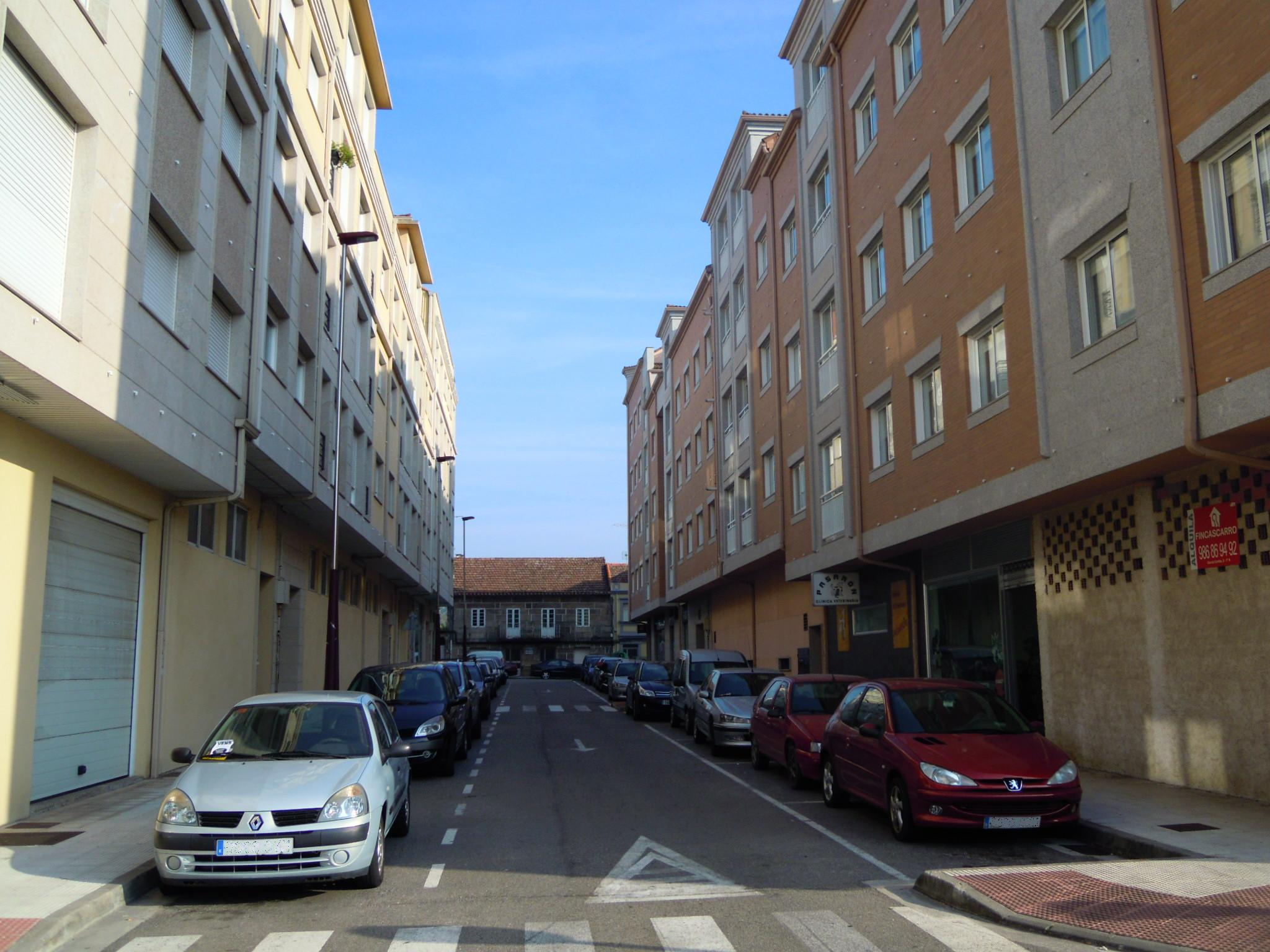
Valentín Paz Andrade Street

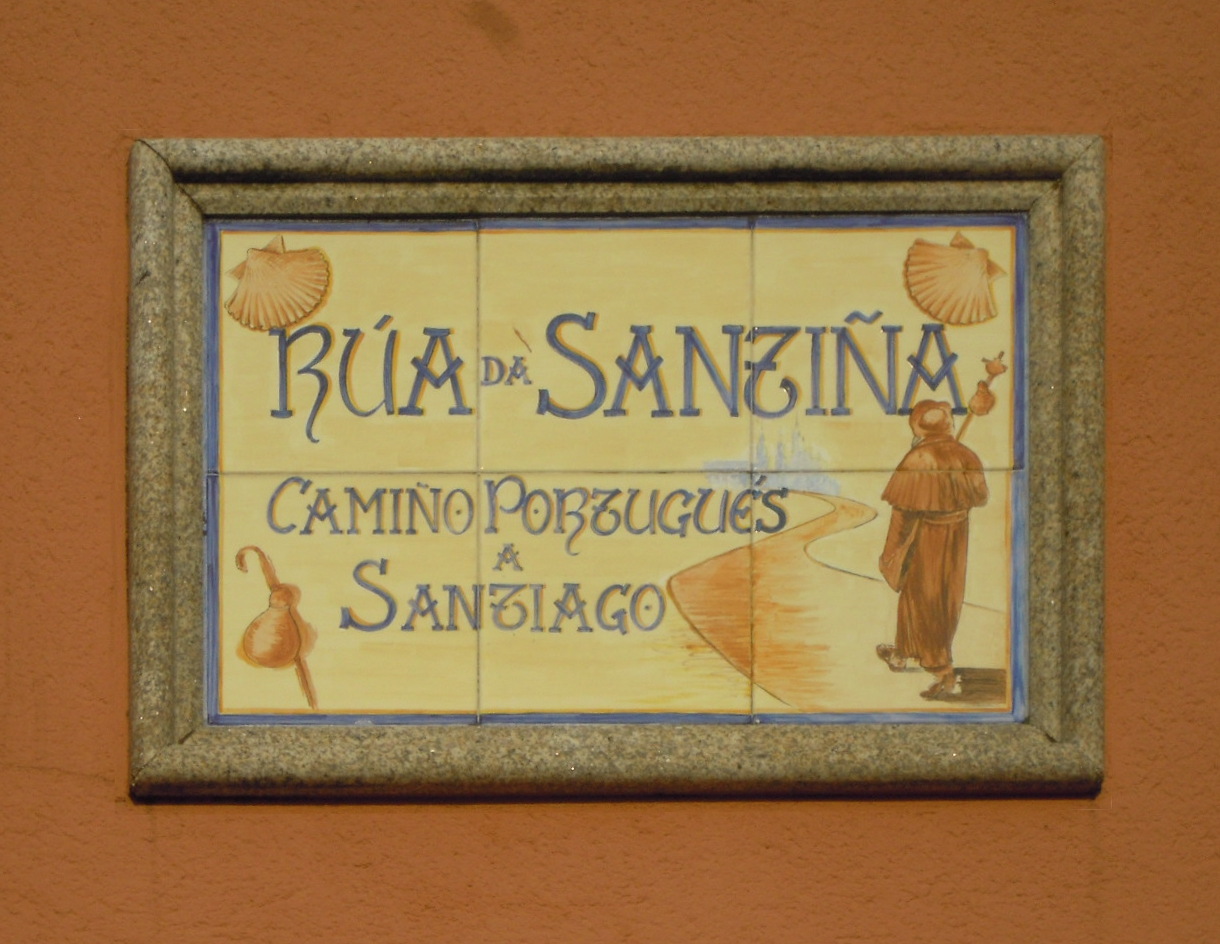
Santiña street sign

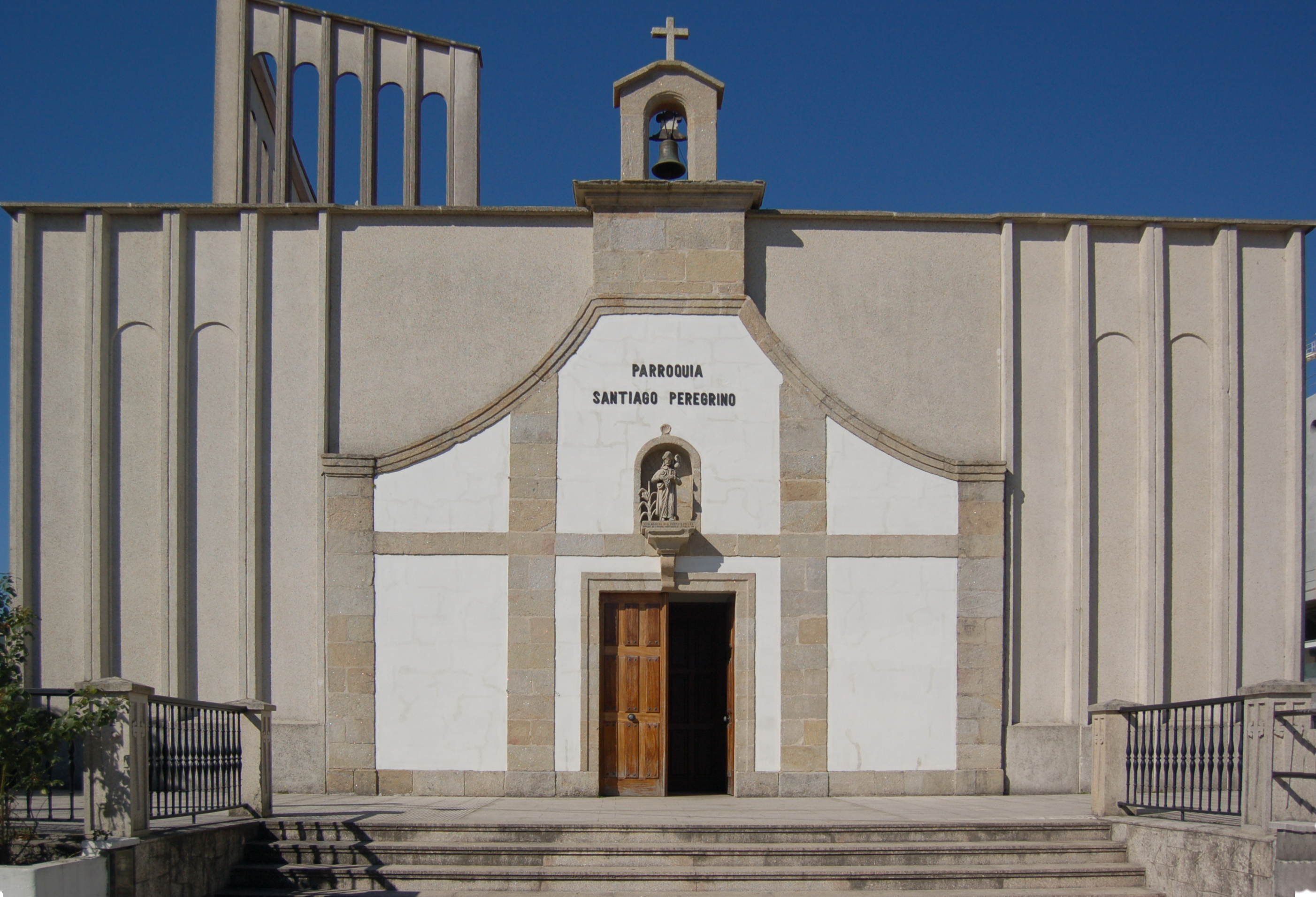
St James Pilgrim of the Burg Church

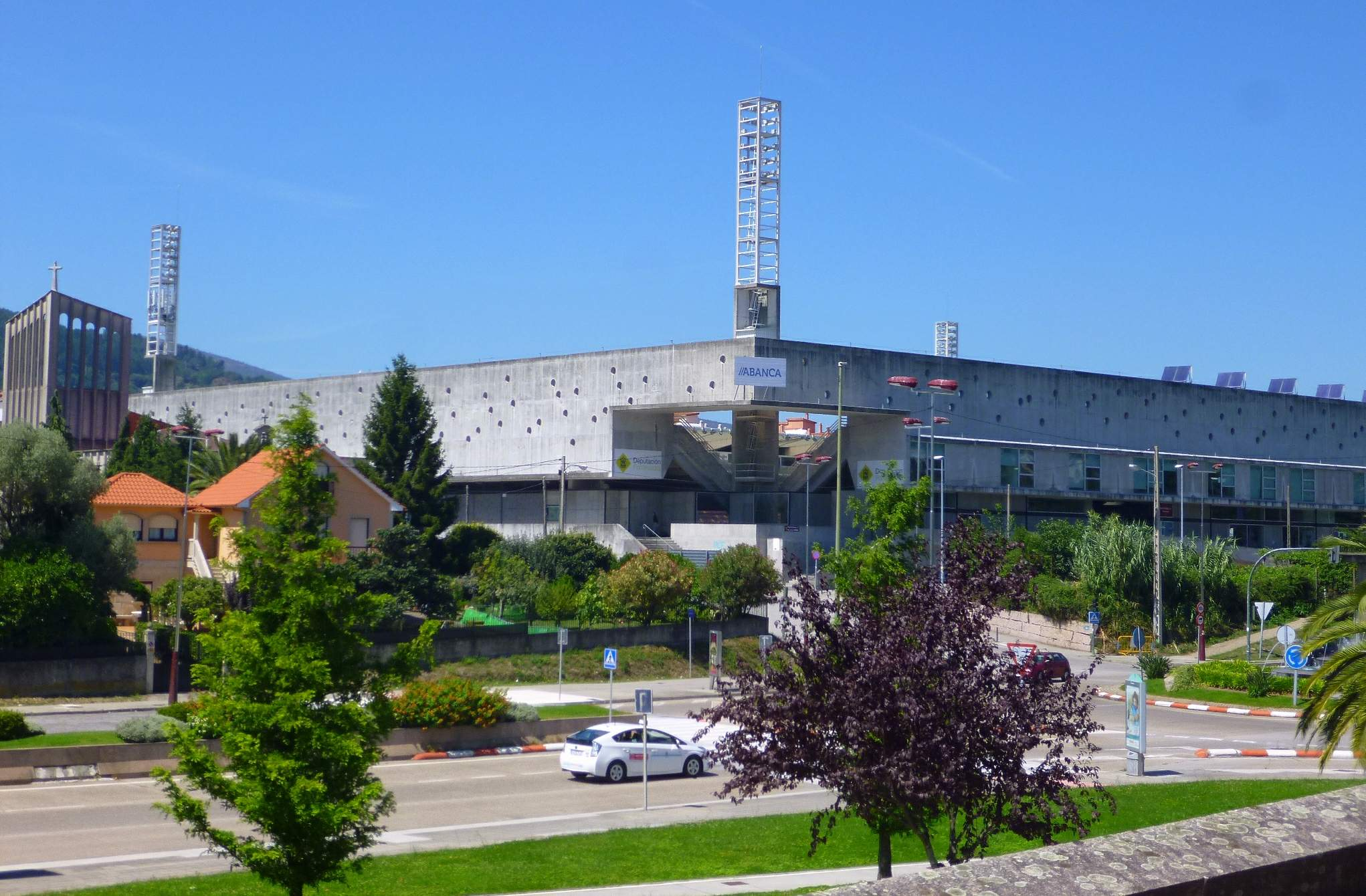
Pasarón Stadium

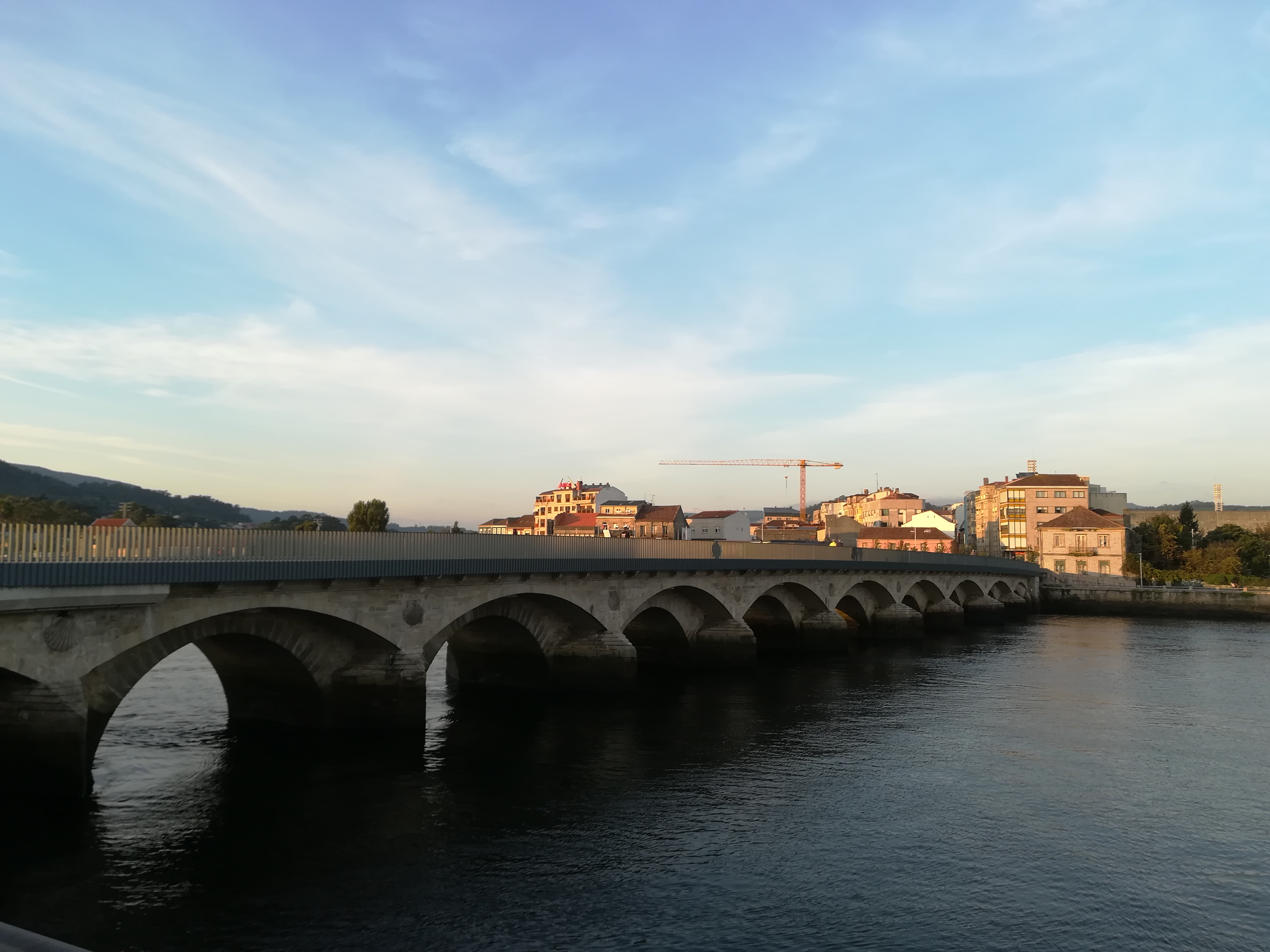
Burgo bridge and the homonymous district in the background

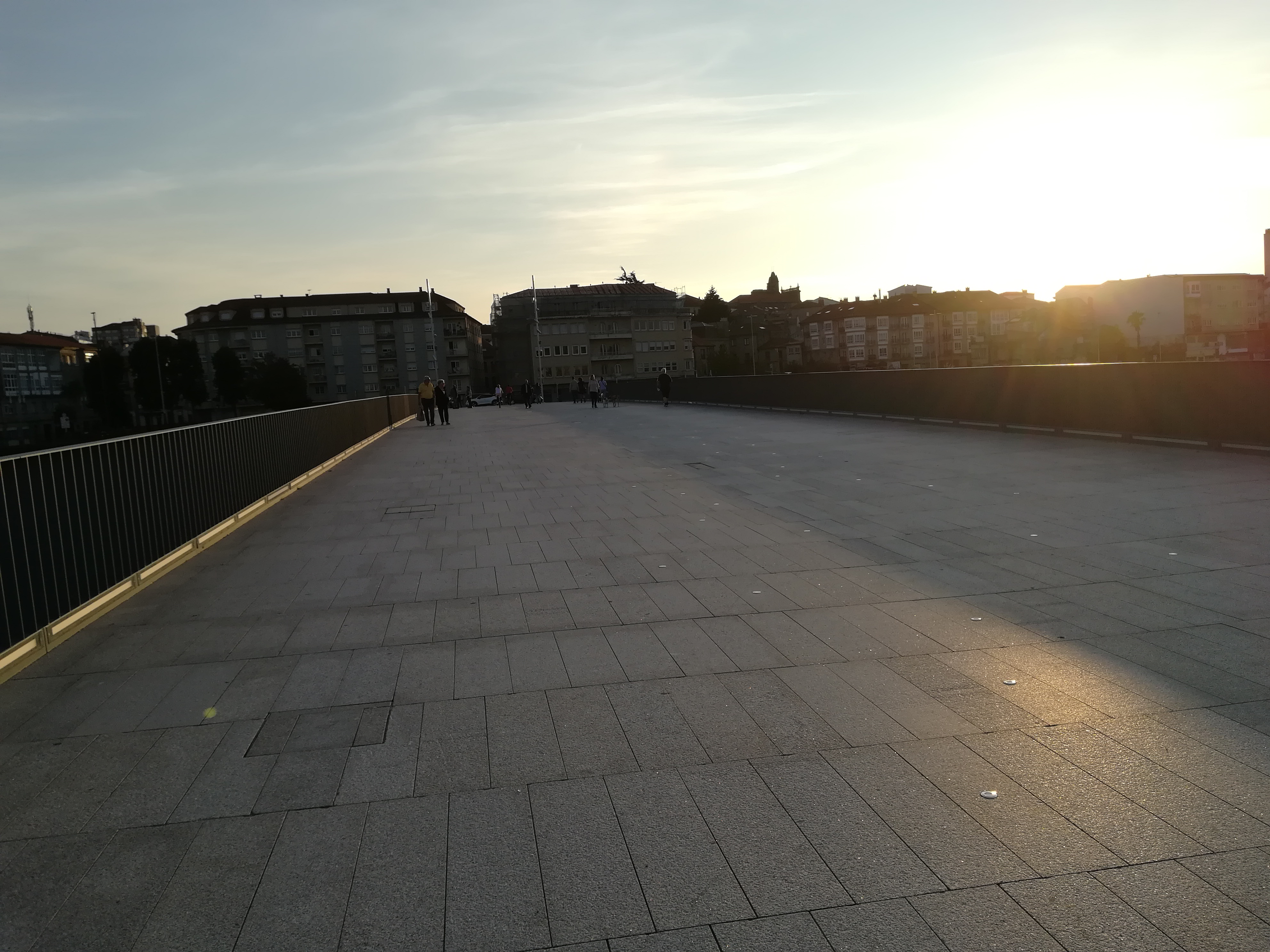
Burgo bridge pedestrianised

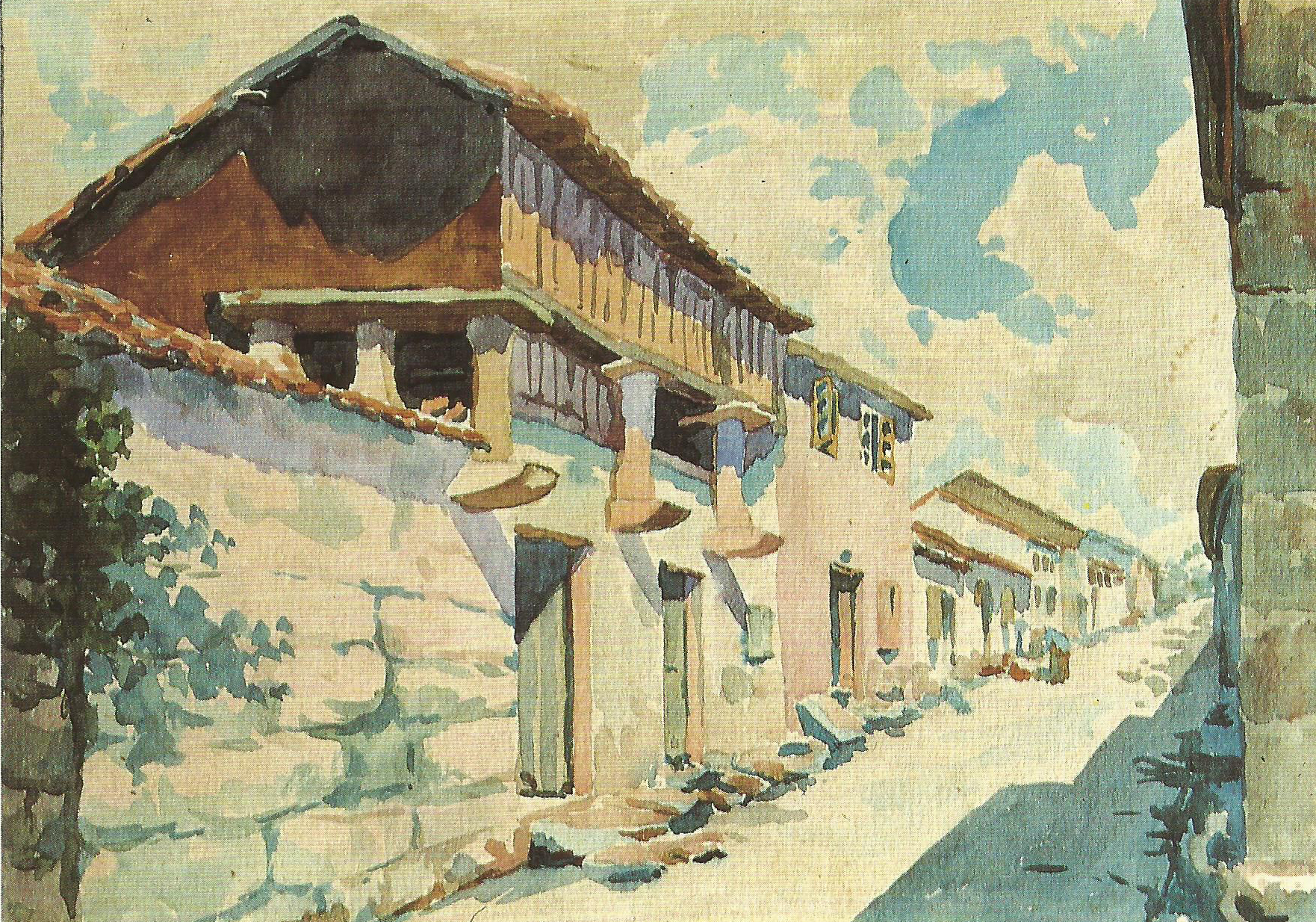
A Santiña Street in 1908, by Enrique Campo

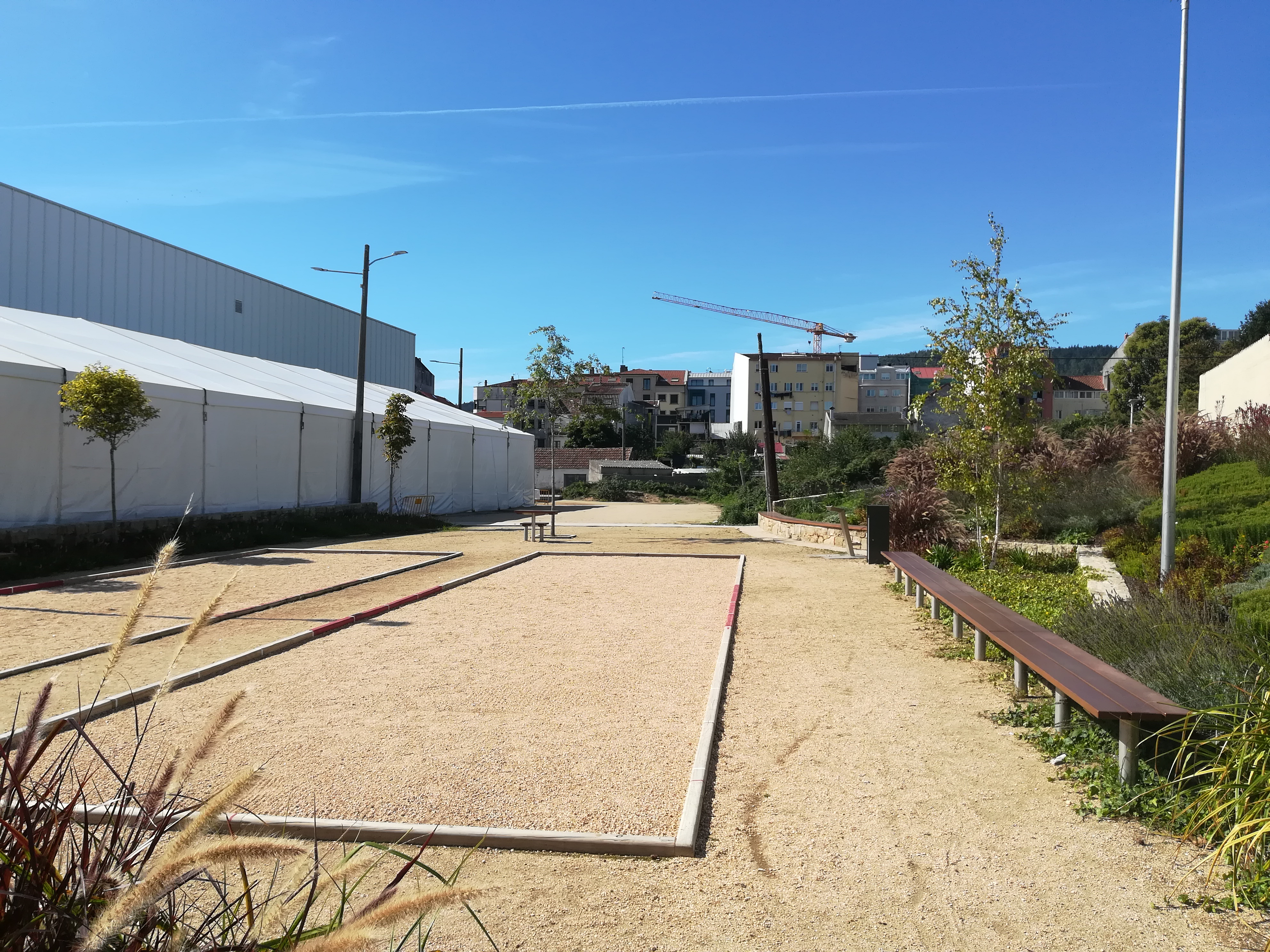
Pétanque court

== See also ==
=== Bibliography ===
- Nadal, Paco (2012). Rias Baixas. Escapadas (in Spanish). Madrid: El País-Aguilar. pp. 34–35. ISBN 978-8403501089.
- Álvarez Pérez, Belén (2021). Pontevedra en la baja edad media: trazado urbano, arquitectura civil y militar (in Spanish). Santiago de Compostela: Universidad de Santiago de Compostela. pp. 124–125.

=== Related articles ===
- Campolongo
- Old town of Pontevedra
- Monte Porreiro

=== External links ===
- Pontevedra en la baja edad media: trazado urbano, arquitectura civil y militar.
