= Marismas de Alba Natural Park =

Natural park in Pontevedra (Spain)

Parque de las Marismas de Alba
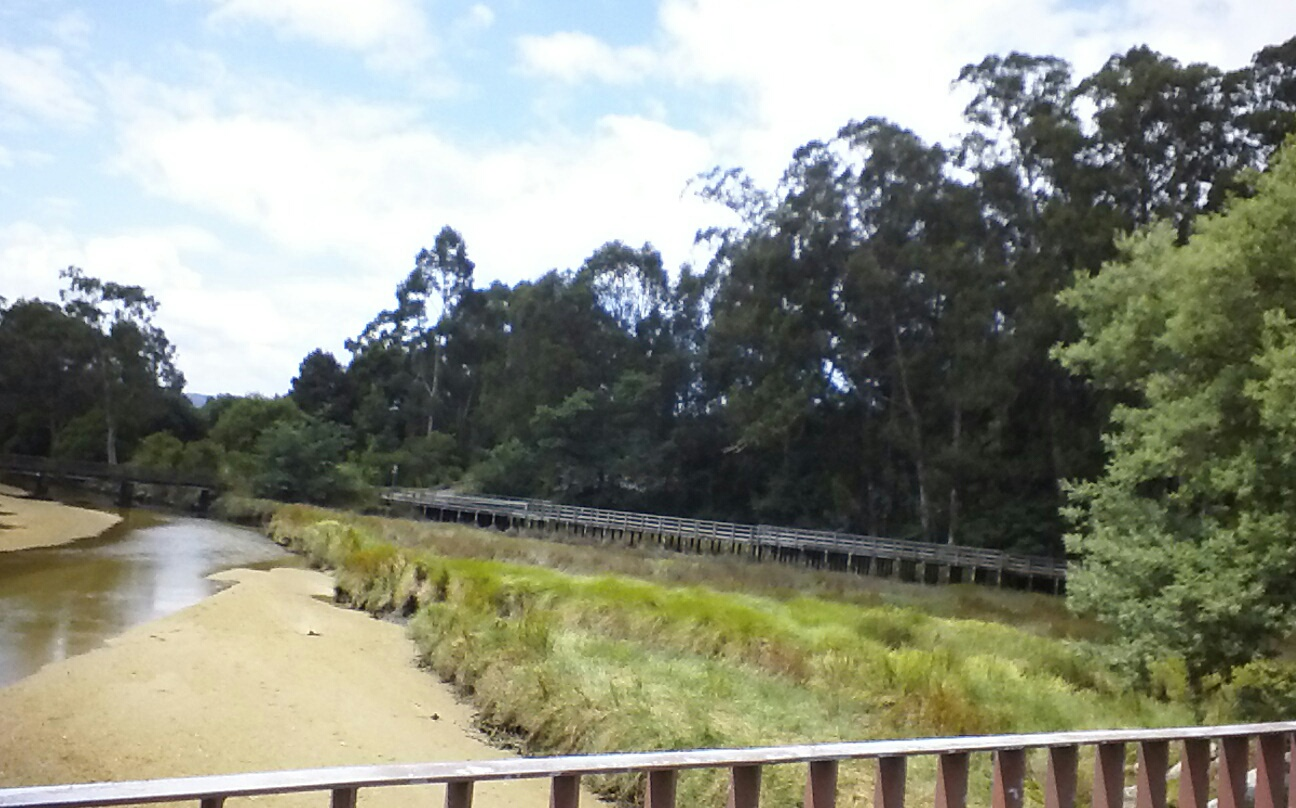
- Interactive map of Parque de las Marismas de Alba
- Location: Pontevedra, Spain
- Coordinates: 42.447157°N 8.646058°W
- Area: 0.67 km^{2} (165.56 acres)
- Created: 2000
- Operator: Municipality of Pontevedra
- Status: Public park

The Natural Park of the Marismas de Alba, the Alba Marsh or the Xunqueira de Alba (in Galician), is a natural park and wetland in the city of Pontevedra in Spain, and one of the few Marshes in the Ria de Pontevedra. It is a park used as a place for walking, cycling and observing the fauna and flora.

== Location and access ==
The park is located at the mouth of the Rons river in the Lérez river – Ria de Pontevedra in the south of the civil parish of Alba, a few metres from the northern part of the city of Pontevedra. Just cross the bowstring bridge of the Currents to find the entrance to the park, in Domingo Fontán Street. It is bordered to the east by the neighbourhood of A Santiña and the Portuguese Way and to the west by the AP-9 motorway.

== History ==
There was no idea of how to use the marsh until the end of the 1970s, when, due to the lack of industrial land in the municipality of Pontevedra, it was decided to drain it and turn it into an industrial area. There were also plans to build a new football stadium or even a theme park.

However, the San Benito Association of the civil parish of Lérez, claimed part of the land as a space belonging in common to the inhabitants of Lérez, which saved this area of great natural wealth from destruction. In 1981, a court in Pontevedra ordered the construction of an industrial and commercial area to be built there to be stopped.

As the Alba Marsh was in a serious state of degradation, the Spanish Ministry of the Environment decided to recover it. The rehabilitation of the marsh was planned by the socialist government of Felipe González and was inaugurated in 2000, with Mariano Rajoy as vice-president of the Spanish government.

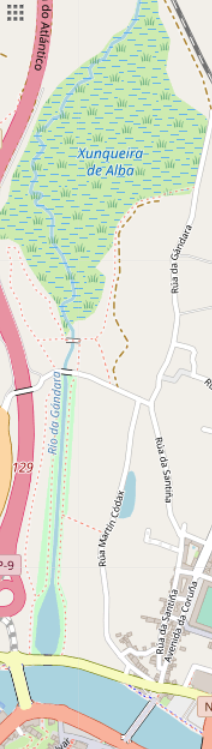
Map of the Marismas de Alba Natural Park

In 2001, the Pontevedra City Council took over the maintenance of the Alba Marsh. The town council cleaned the river, pruned trees and recovered or replaced diseased specimens, mowed meadows and selectively removed weeds, among other works.

In 2012, the nature park was declared the first Natural Area of Local Interest (ENIL) in Galicia.

At the end of December 2021, the project to extend the park with a 17,000 square metre native forest in front of Domingo Fontán Avenue was presented, on the site of the heavy machinery park and the Provincial Printing Office of the Pontevedra Provincial Council, which were demolished. Species such as common oak, cork oak, black ash, common hazel, crack willow, strawberry tree, grey willow, holly and laurel were planted. A pathway was laid out between the Rons River lane and this new open green area, equipped with public lighting and urban furniture.

== Description ==
Three areas can be distinguished in the park: the marsh, the scrubland and the muddy plain at the mouth of the Rons River.

The marshy area of the nature park remains subject to the flow of the tides and thus, every six hours, a part of it goes from being covered by water to being exposed.

In this habitat, which is of great landscape and ecological importance, 17 Trees, 14 species of Shrubs, 4 climbers or creeping plants and 80 herbaceous plants have been inventoried. There are more than two hundred varieties of plants and trees (including Acacias, orchids, Chicory, Willows, eucalyptus, poplars, ash trees) and some seventy animal species listed. There are also many rushes, hence the Galician name xunqueira (rush). There are a total of 115 different species of flora present in the park, such as sea thrift, sea plantain, sea fennel, callitriche stagnalis or broad-leaved cattail.

It is an environment that is home to a wide variety of natural species, both birds and animals, such as Water birds, butterflies, dragonflies, Amphibians and small Mammals. For this reason, the park and the marsh are currently protected. There are three viewpoints in the park to observe the birds in their natural habitat.

A survey carried out between 14 April and 30 September 2020 detected up to 73 different bird species in this nature park, including Little egrets, Common firecrests, European kingfishers, Common moorhens, Pallid swifts, Sedge warblers, European pied flycatchers, Eurasian sparrowhawks, Scarlet ibises or European turtle doves. A total of 142 birds were seen and recorded in this natural area.

At one of the entrances to the park is a "dog play area" opened in 2010, which consists of a large metal enclosure where dogs can run and play freely.

== Gallery ==
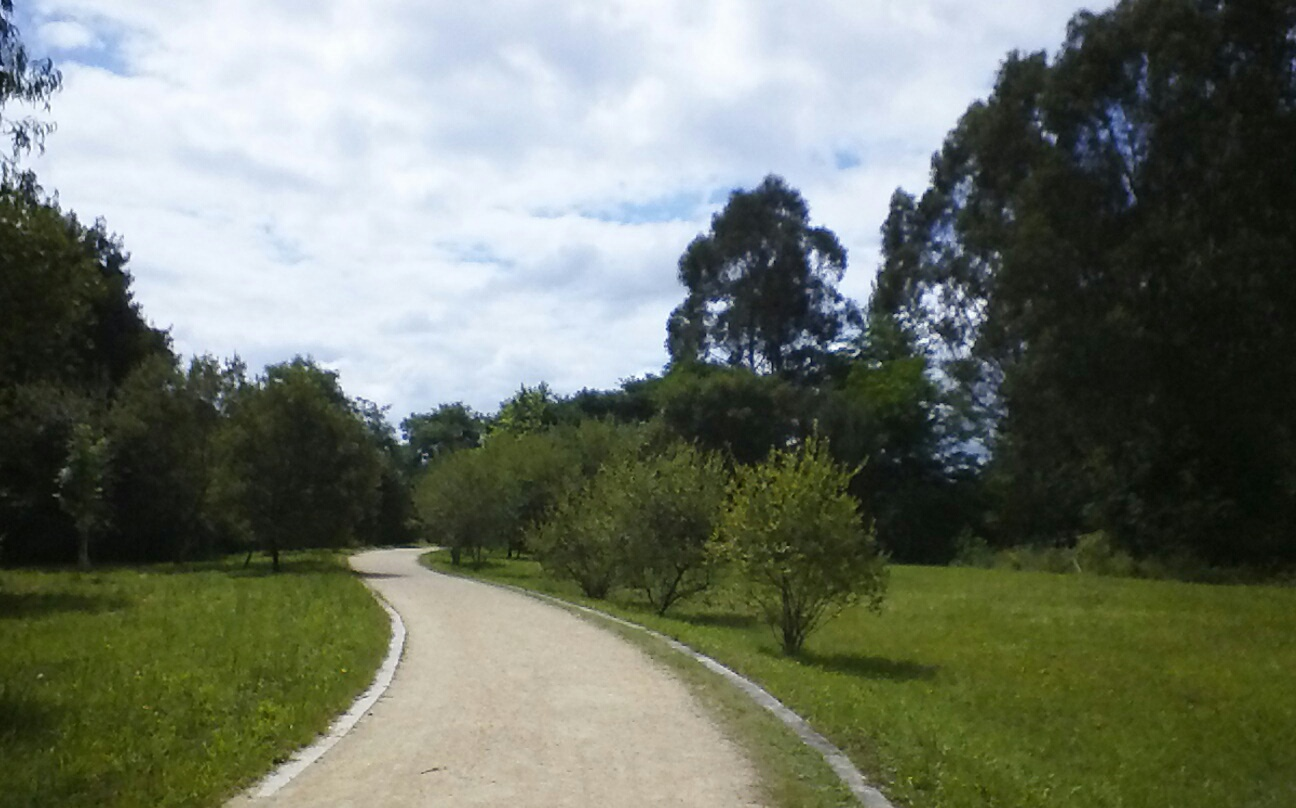
Walking trail

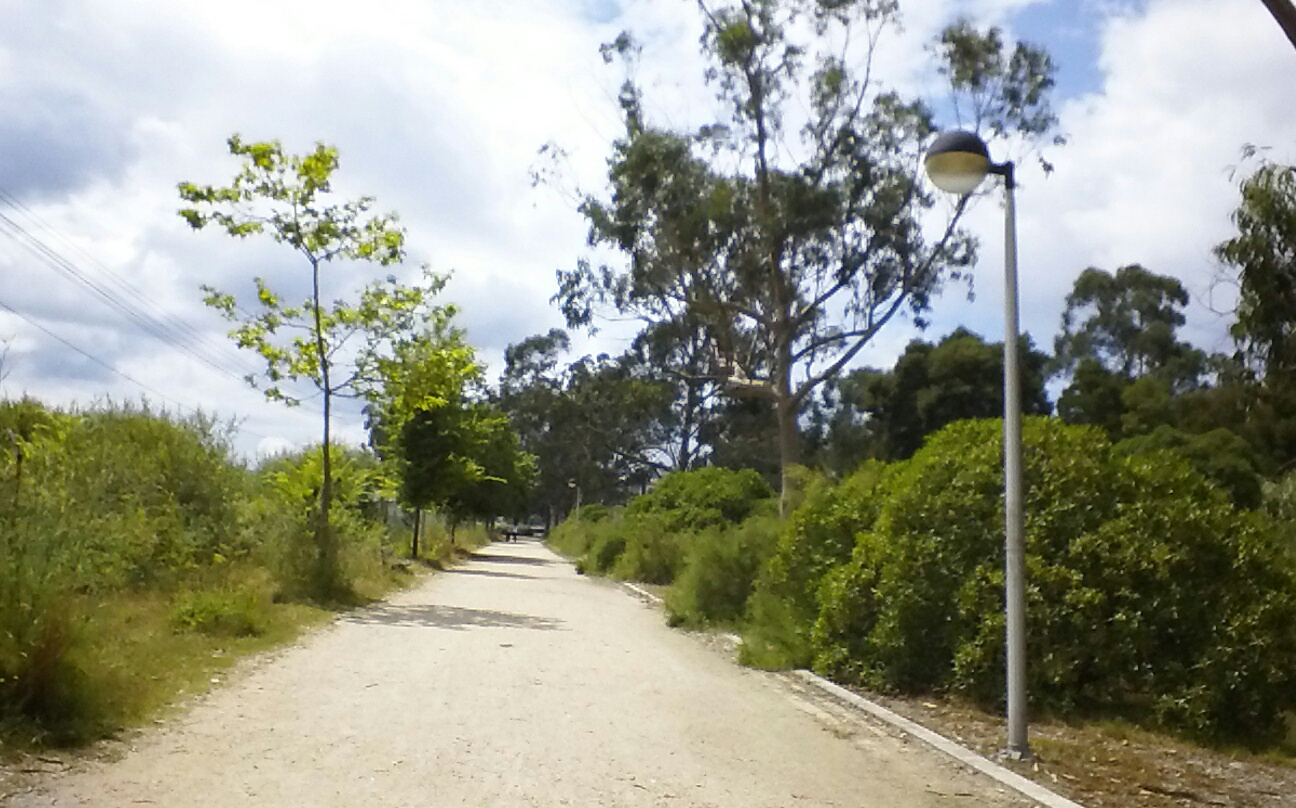
Walking paths

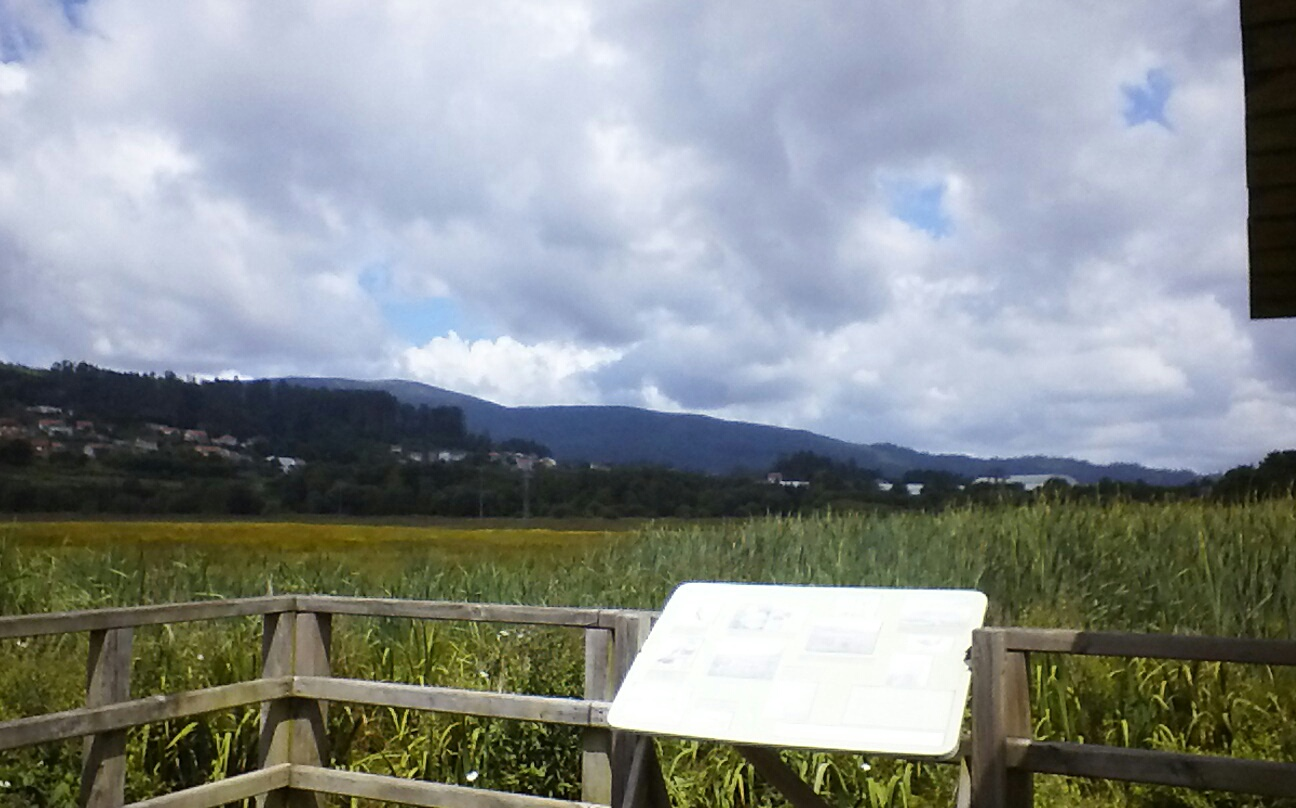
Viewpoint

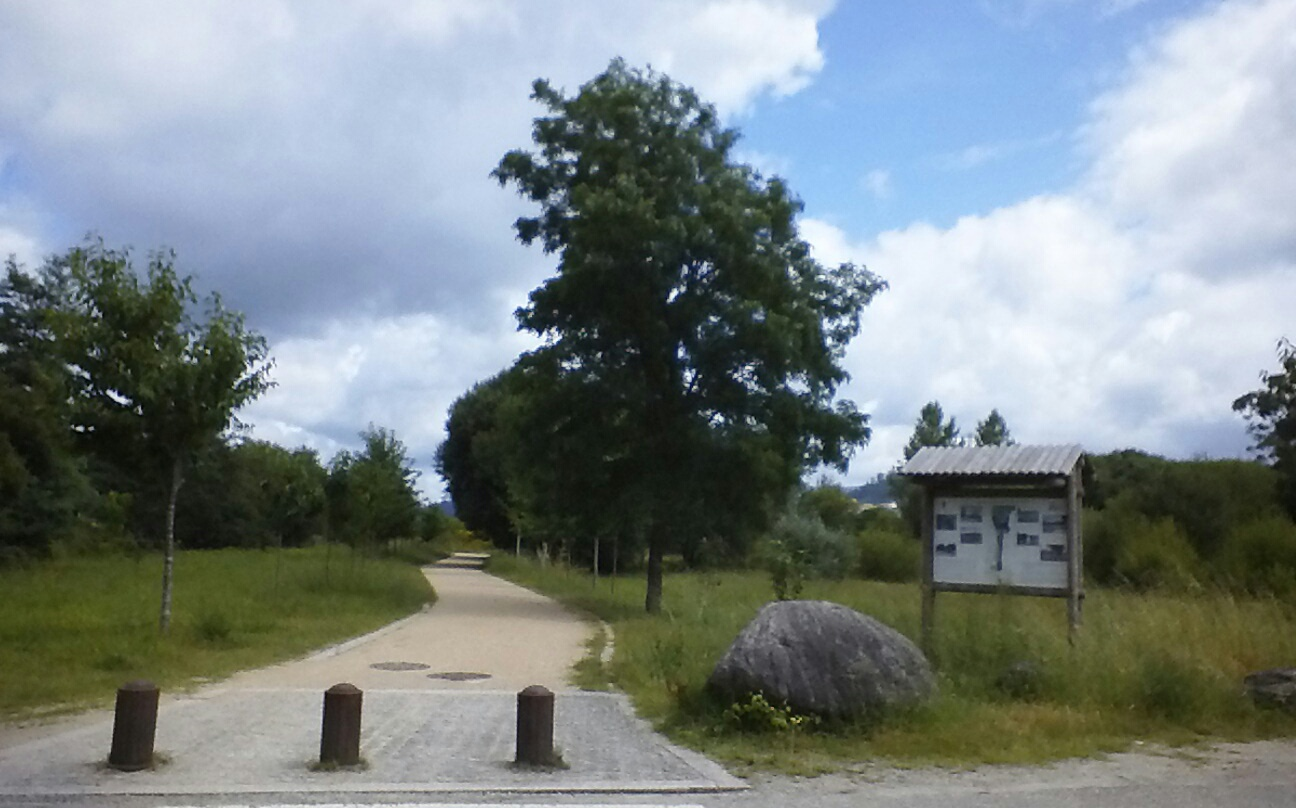
Trails and information board

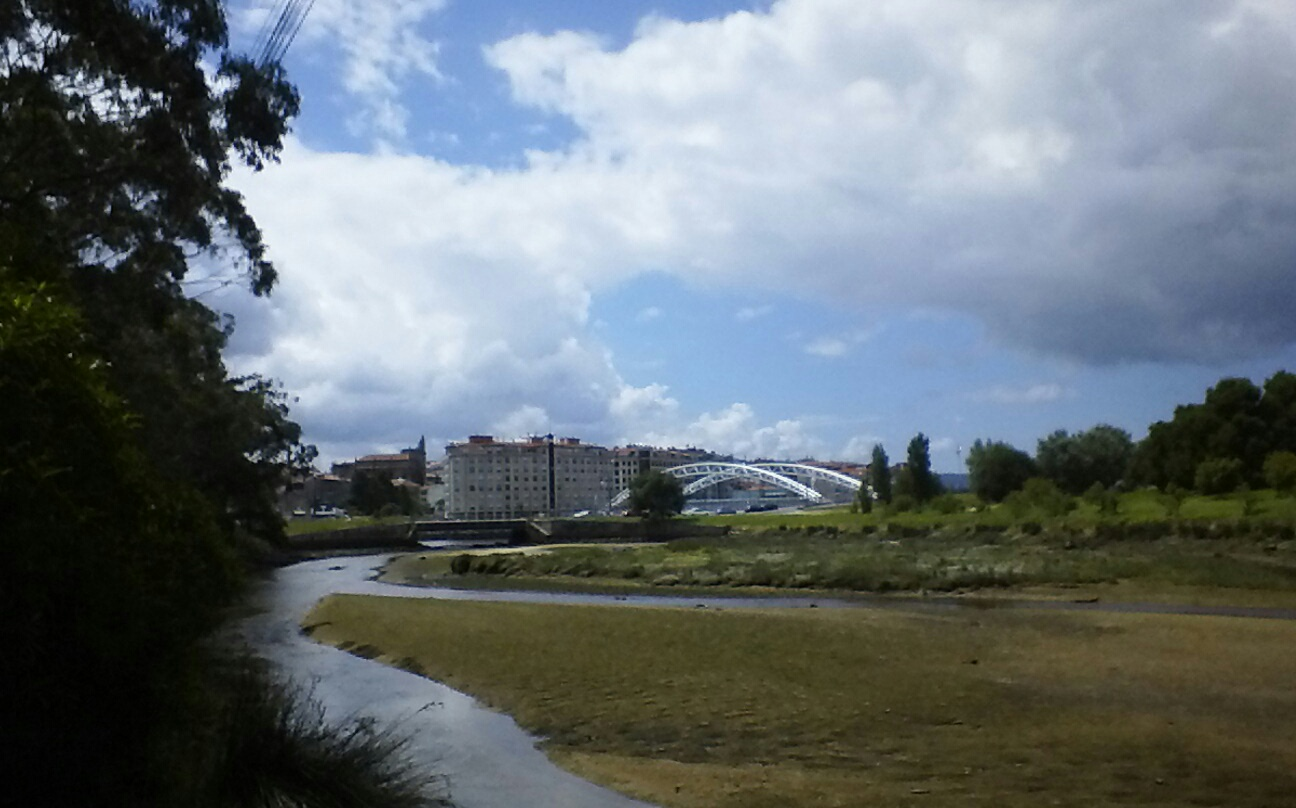
Park marsh and Currents bridge in the background

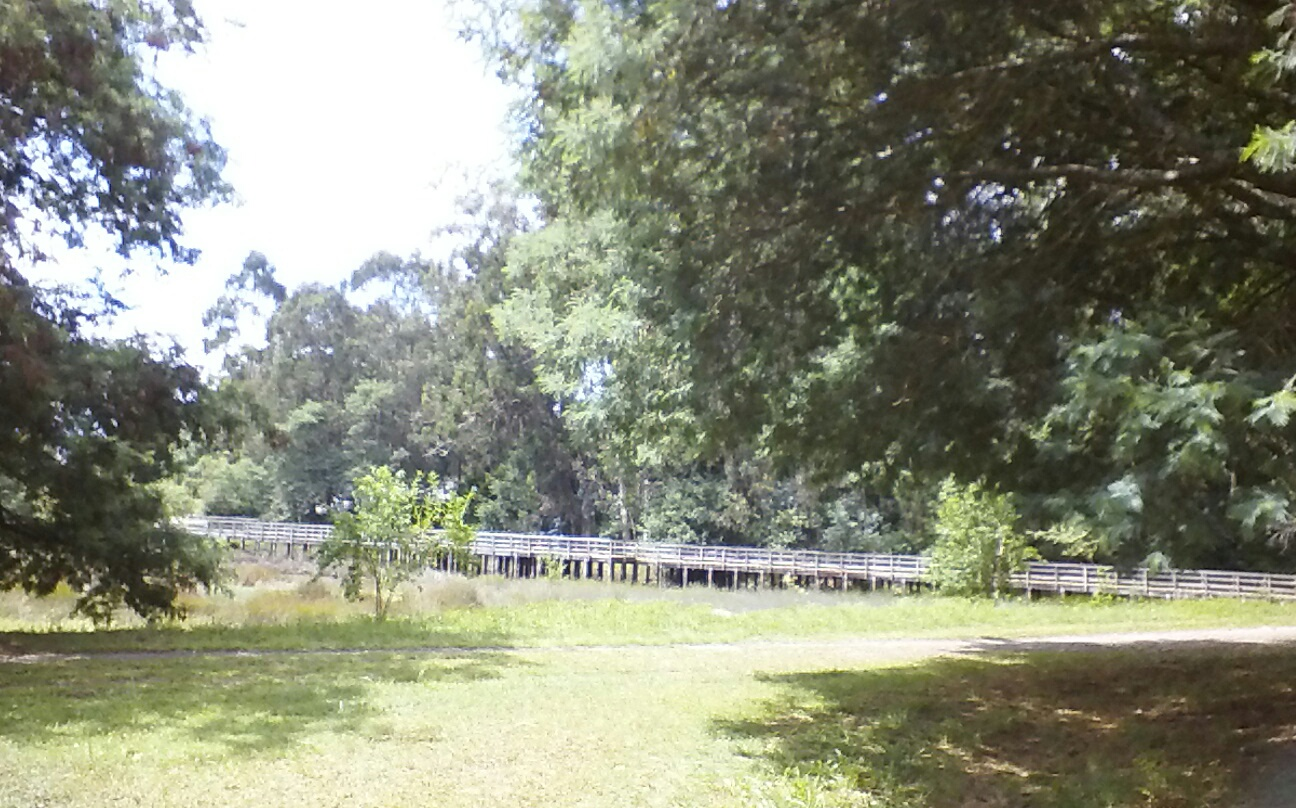
Park and wooden bridge

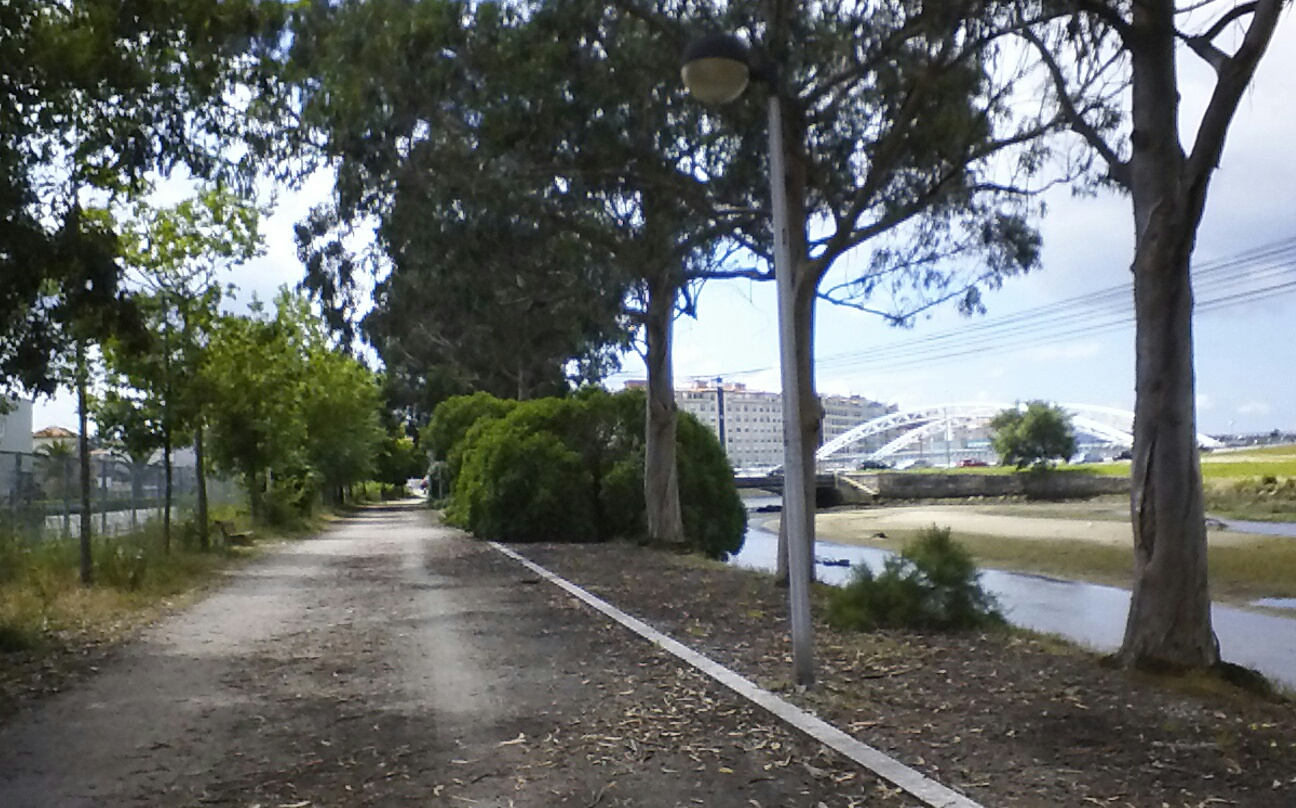
Walking trail near the Currents Bridge and the city, at the mouth of the Rons River

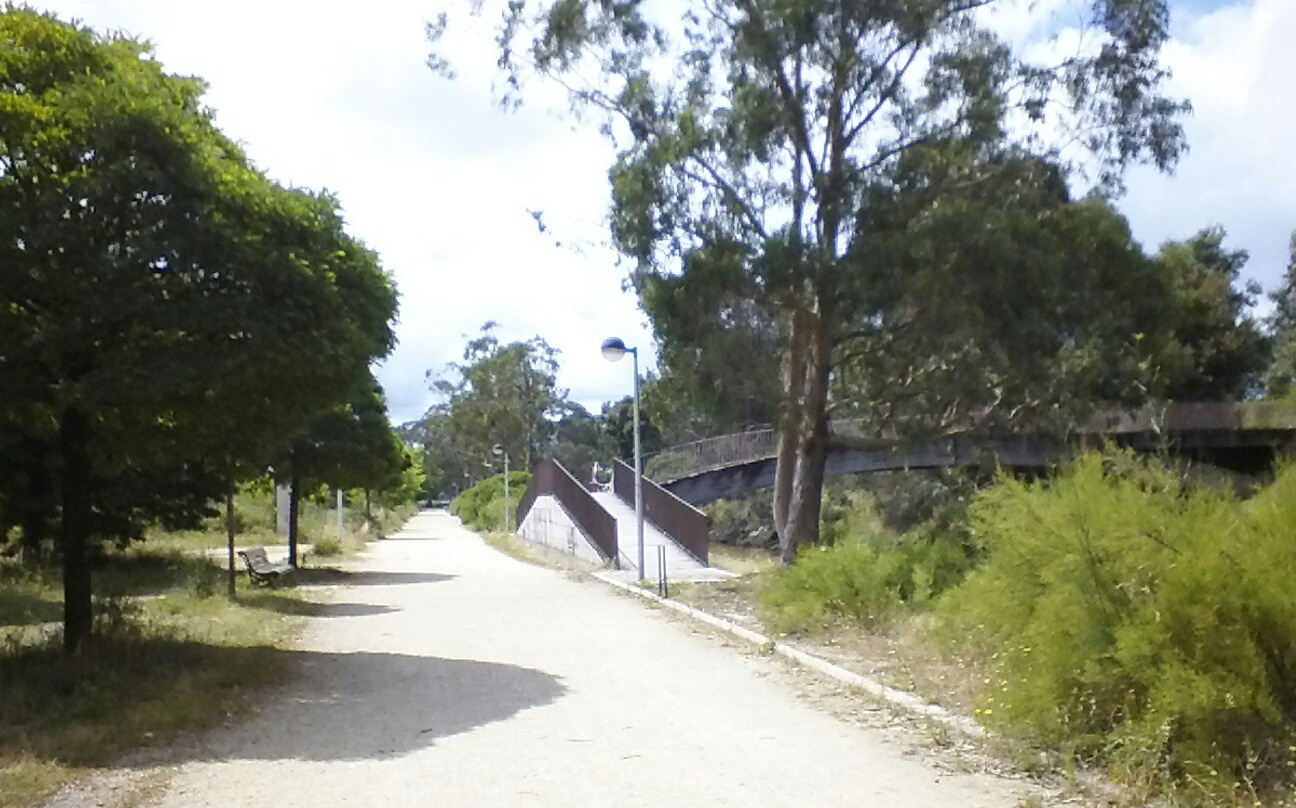
Walking path

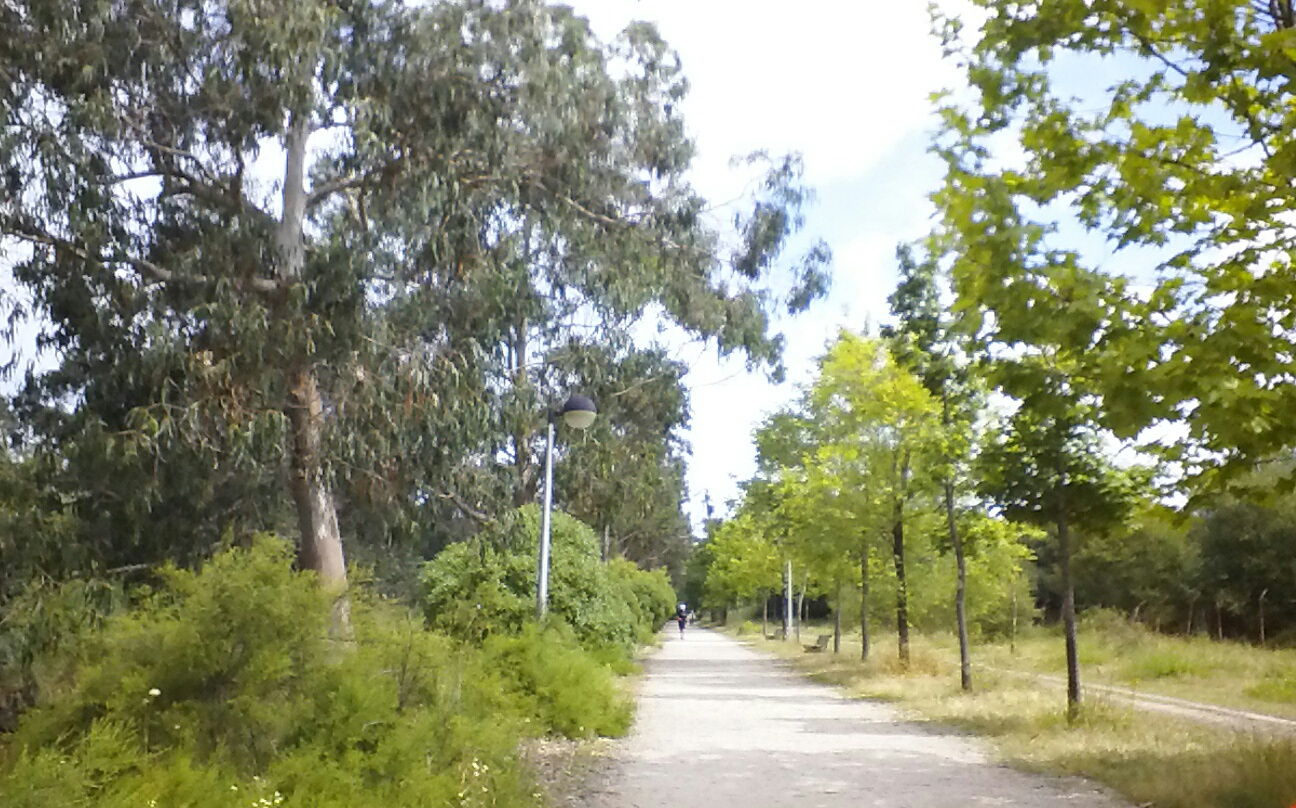
One of the park's alleys

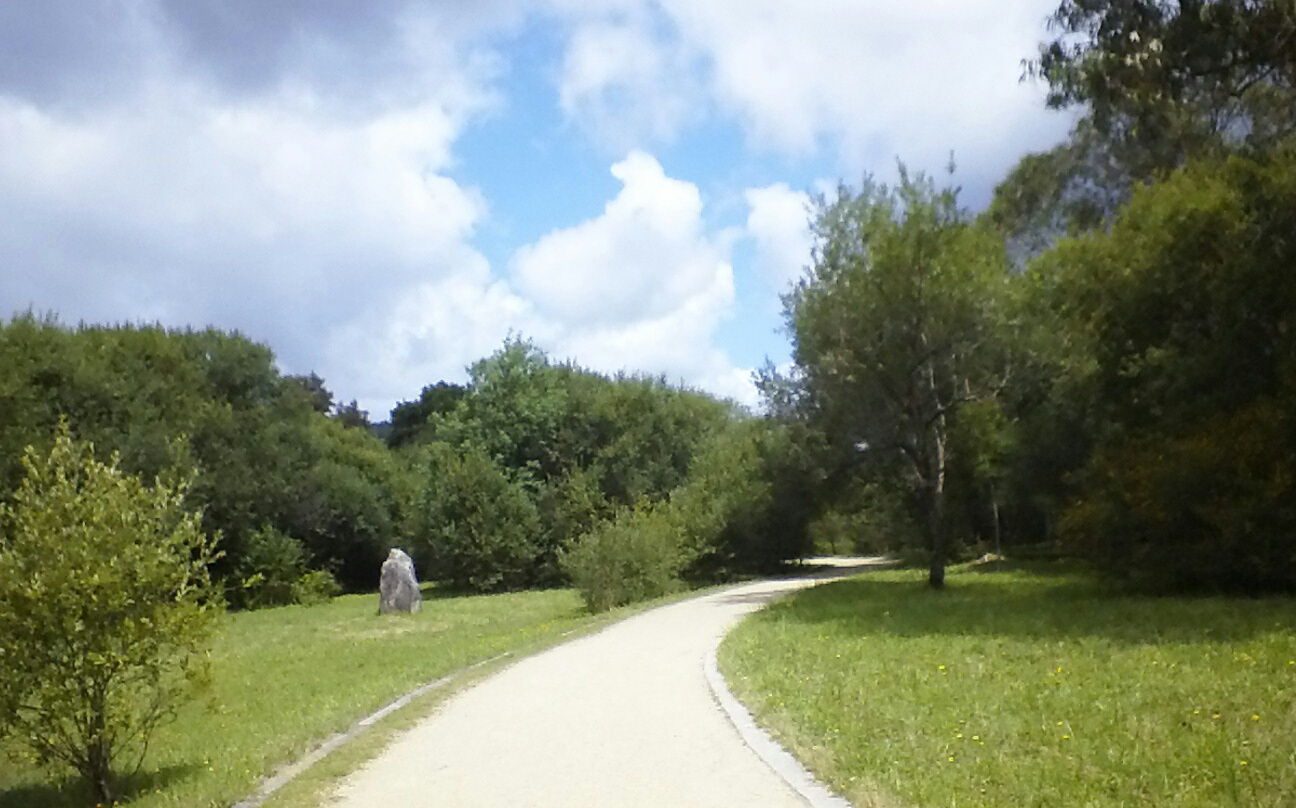
Another path

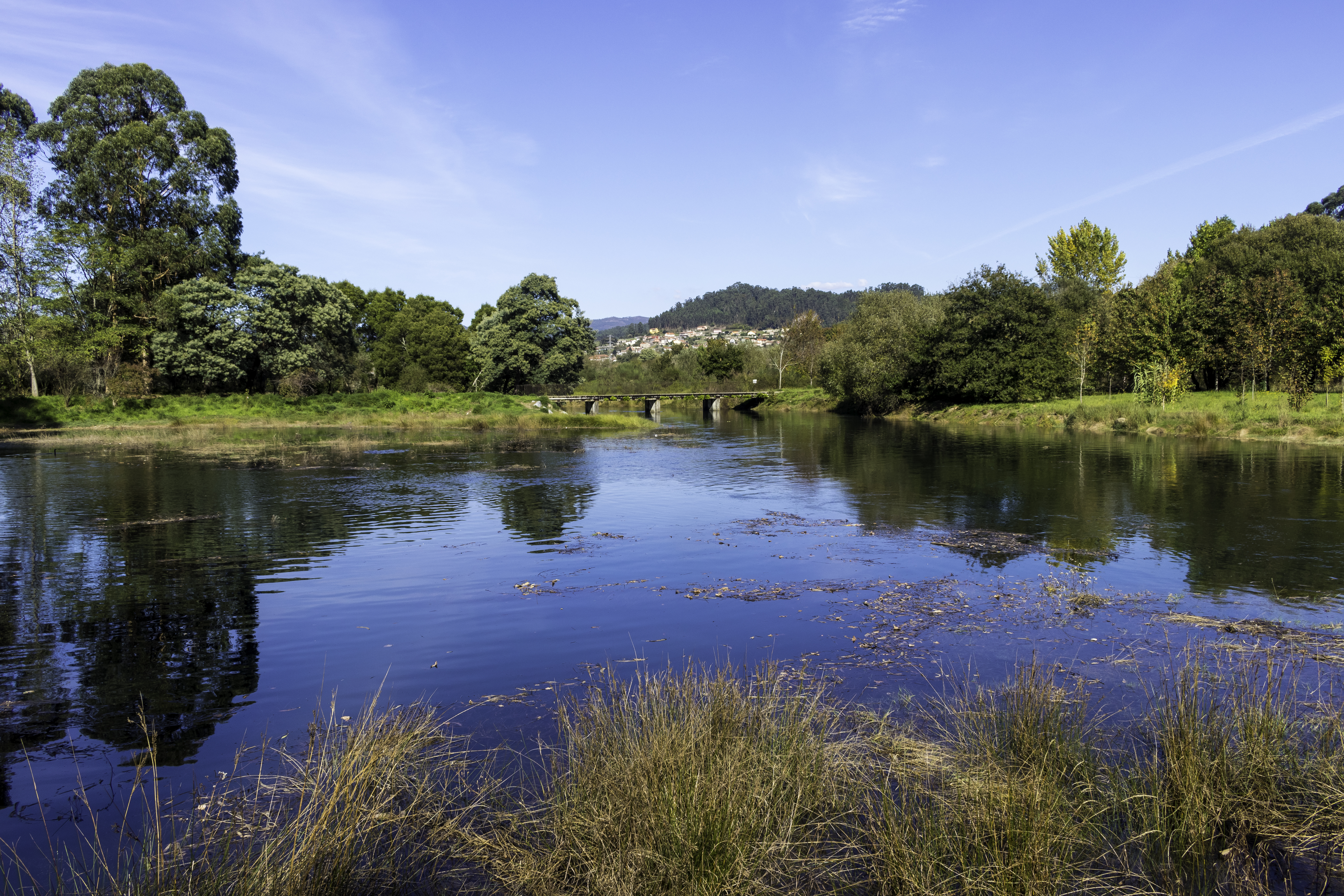
Marsh at high tide

== See also ==
=== Bibliography ===
- Cabaleiro Barros, Vítor Xosé (2010). Guía de aves do ENIL Xunqueira de Alba (in Galician). Pontevedra: Concello de Pontevedra.
- Riveiro Tobío, Elvira (2008). Descubrir Pontevedra (in Spanish). Pontevedra: Edicións do Cumio. pp. 76–77. ISBN 9788482890852.

=== Related articles ===
- O Burgo
- Island of Sculptures
- Alameda de Pontevedra
- Palm Trees park

=== External links ===
- Visit-Pontevedra Xunqueira de Alba
- Book Guía de aves do ENIL Xunqueira de Alba
- Rural Development Association of the Pontevedra Region
- Marismas d'Alba Natural Park Video
