= Paseo Marítimo de Pontevedra =

Seafront in Pontevedra, Spain

Pontevedra seafront promenade
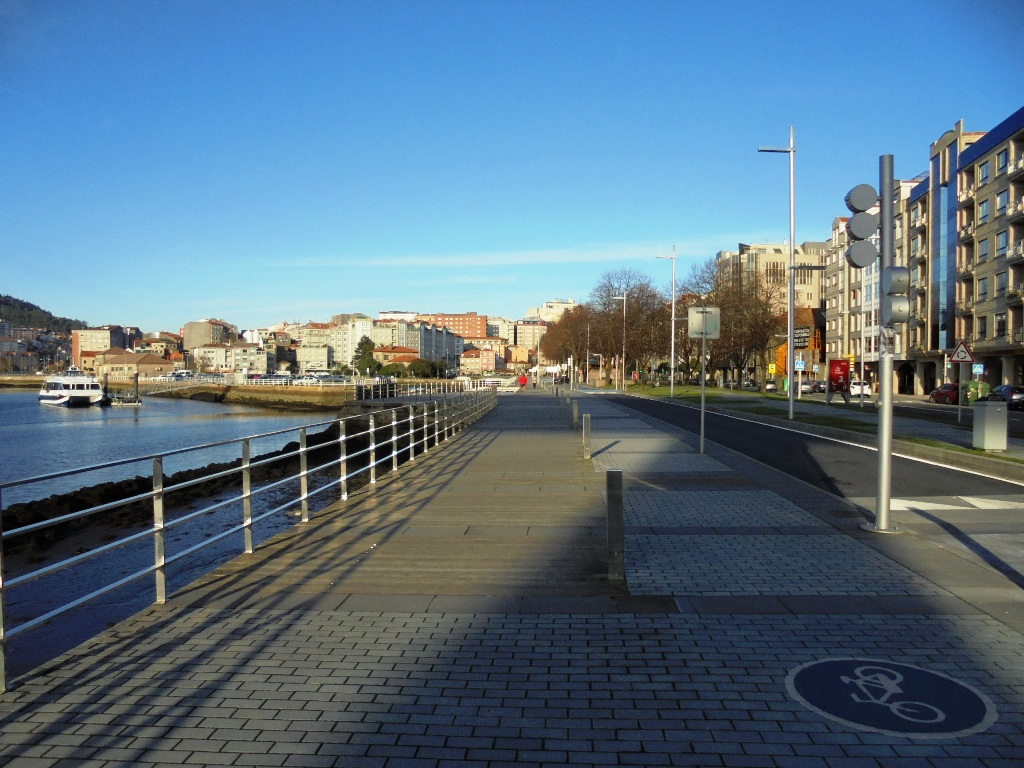
- Paseo Marítimo
- Native name: Paseo Marítimo de Pontevedra (Spanish)
- Type: Esplanade
- Maintained by: Pontevedra City Council
- Location: Pontevedra, Spain
- Postal code: 36002
- Coordinates: 42.4209°N 8.6547°W

The paseo marítimo of Pontevedra is a pedestrian way along the seafront facing the ria of Pontevedra, in Pontevedra, Spain. This coastal public space is built in the urban and semi-urban area of the city and defines its encounter with the sea and the Lérez river.

== History ==
At the beginning of the 20th century it was a rough and stony path along the Ria de Pontevedra and the Lérez river. The current pedestrian walkway has several sections that were built at different times by different public administrations.

Until 1997, the banks of the Lérez river were not developed. In 1996, the Galician Government awarded the construction work on the banks from the Tirantes Bridge to the Lérez Beach area to the construction company OCP, including a new access to the Monte Porreiro district. Work began on 7 October 1996. The project covered a total of 42,000 square metres on the left bank of the river. On the right bank, the project consisted of the development of a 110,000 square metre strip with green spaces, wooden bridges, improvement of the forestry, installation of urban furniture and lighting. The promenade, known as the Paseo del Lérez, was inaugurated by the President of the Galician Government on 24 July 1997. From that day on, this pedestrian way has been the main place for the inhabitants of Pontevedra to walk.

In 2000, the Ministry of Public Works began the redesign of the Orillamar pedestrian way (Beiramar in Galician) from the Burgo Bridge to the port of Corbaceiras. A roundabout with an ornamental pool was created in front of the Burgo Bridge and the sculpture Dorna by the artist Xaime Quesada was installed there. It was later moved to Gorgullón street during the new restructuring of Avenida Uruguay in 2006. The work on this new pedestrian promenade on the banks of the Ria de Pontevedra was inaugurated by the Vice-President of the Spanish Government, Mariano Rajoy, on 20 August 2001.

In 2009, the Pontevedra City Council launched the project to extend the promenade from the port of Corbaceiras and the mouth of the Gafos River into the Pontevedra ria, to open up the city to the sea. The project was designed by the architect José Ramón Garitaonaindia de Vera. The seafront has been developed, one lane of the PO-12 dual carriageway has been removed and land in the public maritime domain has been occupied. An observation platform was built on stilts over the ria de Pontevedra, overlooking the island of Tambo. The promenade was inaugurated on 25 March 2011.

In July 2017, the city council refurbished the Lérez promenade by repairing cracks in the footpath and cycle path. A section of approximately 300 metres, between the Lérez Beach and the Tirantes Bridge, was also strengthened by the installation of almost 700 piles with beams placed on the edge of the promenade.

In June 2020, the Ministry of Ecological Transition awarded the construction company San José the contract to extend the seafront promenade (including a cycle path) by more than two kilometres, from the Malvar roundabout to Os Placeres, in the civil parish of Lourizán. Work began in August 2020. The first kilometre and three hundred metres of this section of the promenade was officially opened to pedestrians on 26 February 2022.

== Description ==
Visually and in the collective unconscious, the Paseo Marítimo, the Paseo de Orillamar and the Paseo del Lérez form a single coastal artery: Orillamar (= Seaside).

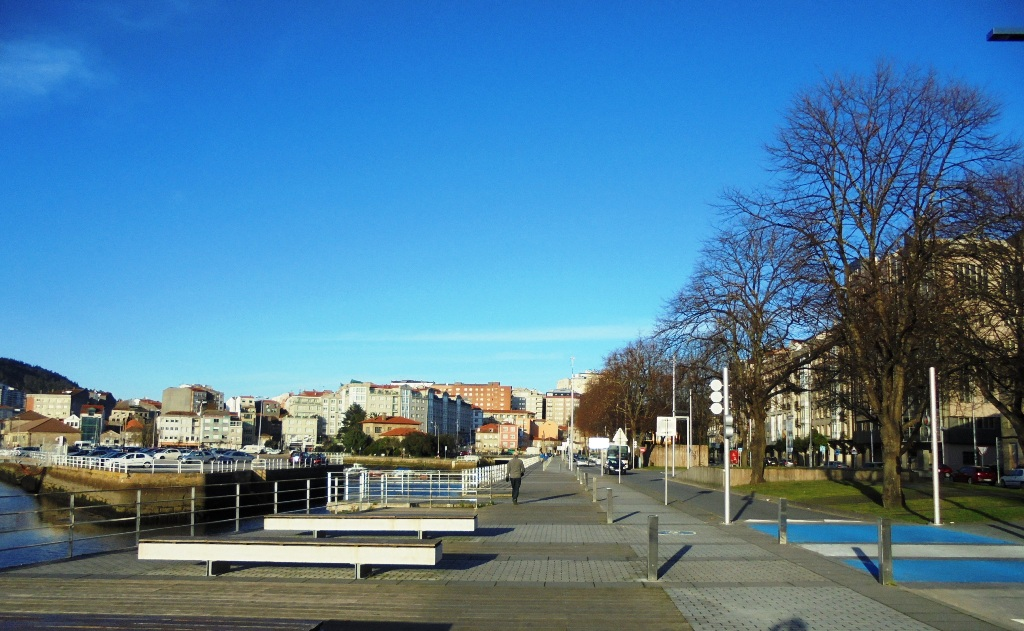
Benches of the Paseo Marítimo

- Paseo marítimo: From the port of Corbaceiras to the Malvar roundabout, the promenade has a 1 km long, 2.5-metre wide wooden path overlooking the ria de Pontevedra in some places and a 2.2-metre wide cycle path. In the area near Manuel del Palacio street, stone steps leading down to the ria de Pontevedra have been repaired. The promenade includes LED lighting bollards separating the cycle path from the pedestrian walkway, several concrete design benches covered in wood near the junction of Manuel del Palacio street and a 100 square metre observation point on stilts above the ria de Pontevedra with views of the island of Tambo. In 2020, work began to extend the promenade by a further two kilometres, incorporating a cycle path along the entire length of the promenade. The aim of extending the promenade is to open up the city to the sea.

When the tide is low in the estuary, large sandbanks are exposed, forming a wetland area that attracts many seabirds such as herons, gulls, waders and sea ducks. This area is attracting more and more birdwatchers.

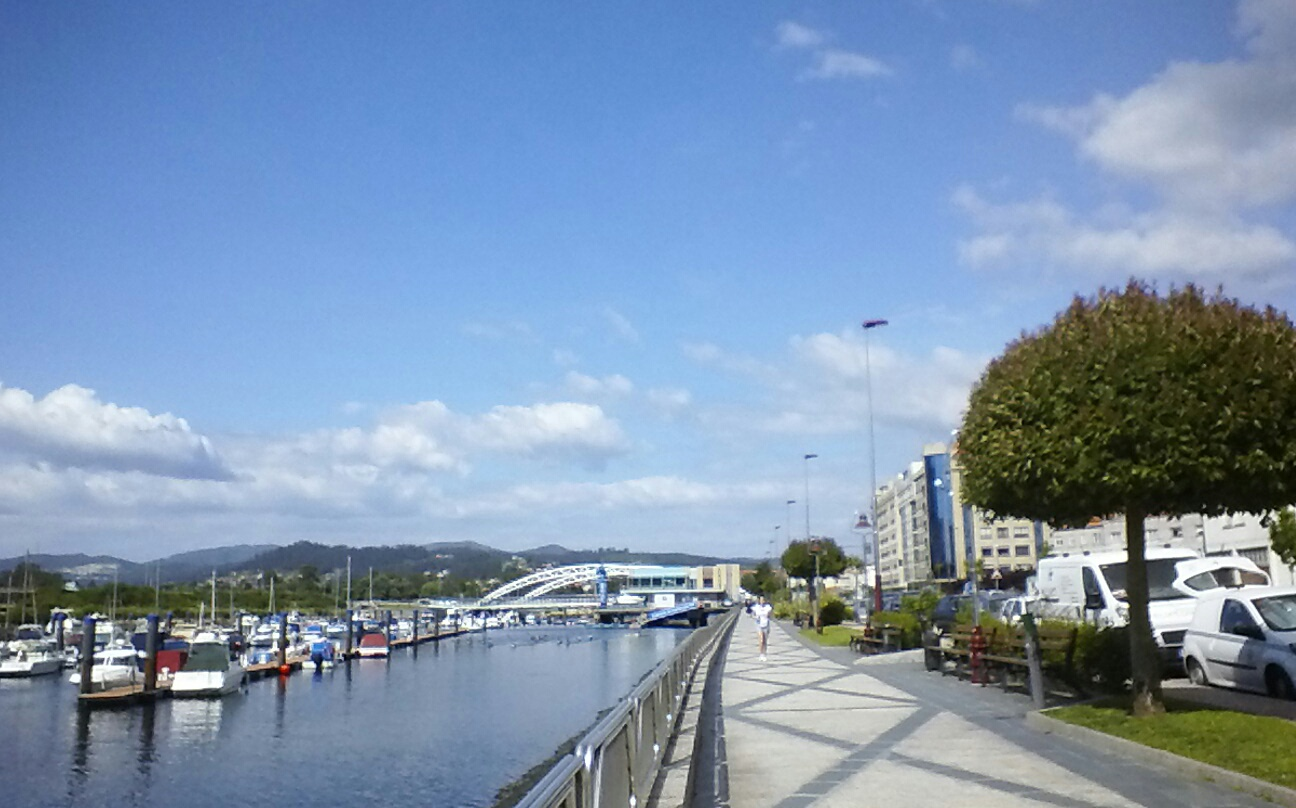
Paseo de Orillamar and Pontevedra marina

- Paseo de Orillamar (from the port of Corbaceiras to the Burgo Bridge): The Orillamar promenade is equipped with a stainless steel railing, wooden benches, litter bins, lawns, shrubs, trees (stone pines, weeping figs, liquidambar, camphor trees, Callery pear trees, privets), a red hedge behind the benches and several drinking water fountains. The promenade is surfaced with pink granite and black slate tiles arranged in a criss-cross pattern. The pedestrian walkway crosses the Barca Bridge with a wooden platform that runs inside one of the spans of the bridge. A pedestrian underground passage with natural light through the upper roundabout on Uruguay Avenue, runs under the Currents Bridge. This passage is protected on the side of the ria by a glass screen, so that the water can be seen during high tides when the sea level rises.

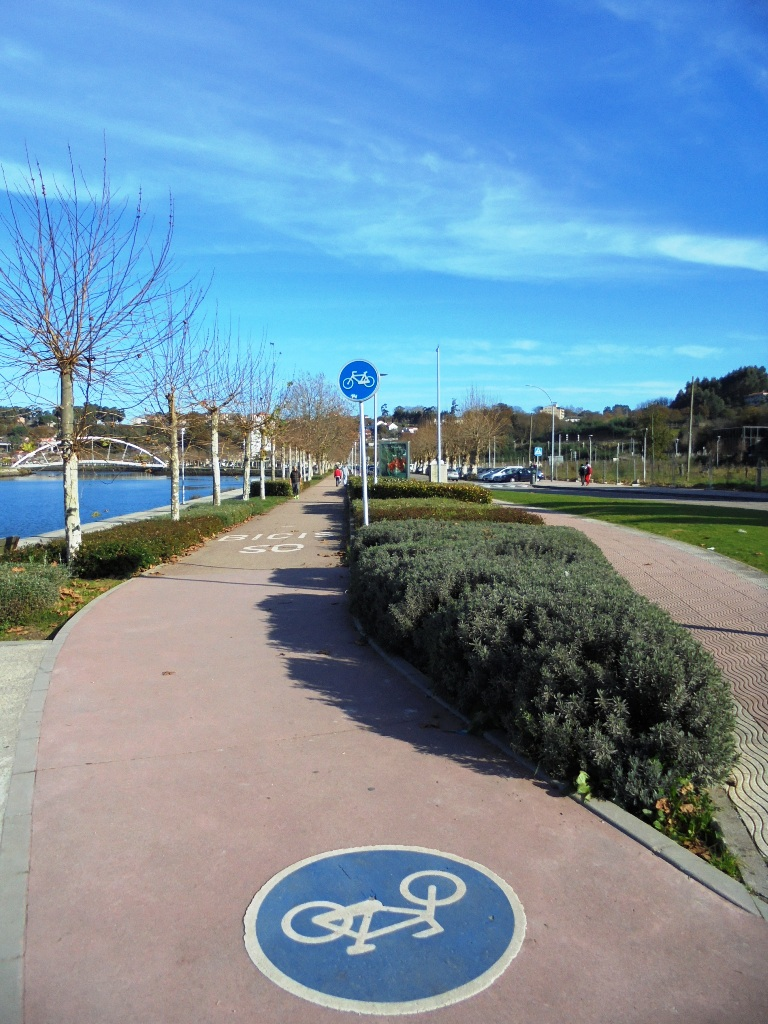
Paseo del Lérez cycle path

- Paseo del Lérez (from the Tirantes Bridge to the Lérez Beach): It includes a cycle path, a pedestrian promenade with a breakwater and granite steps leading down to the river, benches, lampposts and gardens with rows of plane trees In the middle of the promenade is the cable-stayed footbridge designed by the civil engineer Hugo Corres Peiretti, which spans the Lérez river and leads to the Island of Sculptures park. The curved deck of this bridge, which allows small boats to pass, has a span of 82.50 metres and a deflection of 13.40 metres, with a sheet metal deck and a curved arch of 1 metre diameter.

=== Tourist attractions ===
- The bridges crossing the ria de Pontevedra and the Lérez river: the Barca Bridge, the Currents Bridge, the Burgo Bridge and the Tirantes Bridge.
- The Pontevedra marina, next to the Paseo d'Orillamar (Uruguay Avenue).
- The central market of Pontevedra, near the Burgo Bridge.
- The Pontevedra Museum, near the Santiago Bridge.
- The sandbanks at low tide for watching seabirds.
- The Tambo Island, can be seen from the promenade.

== Gallery ==
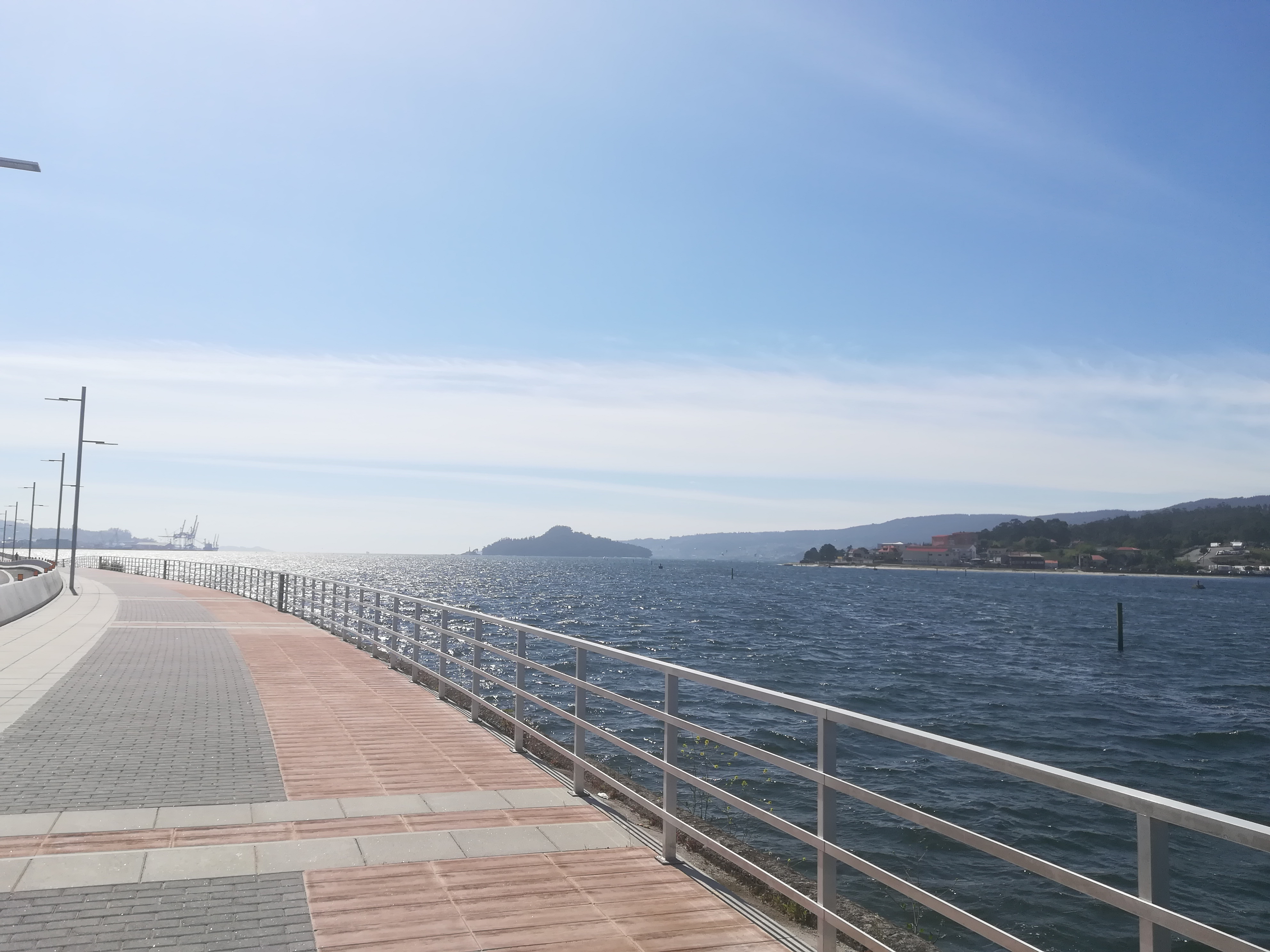
Seafront promenade

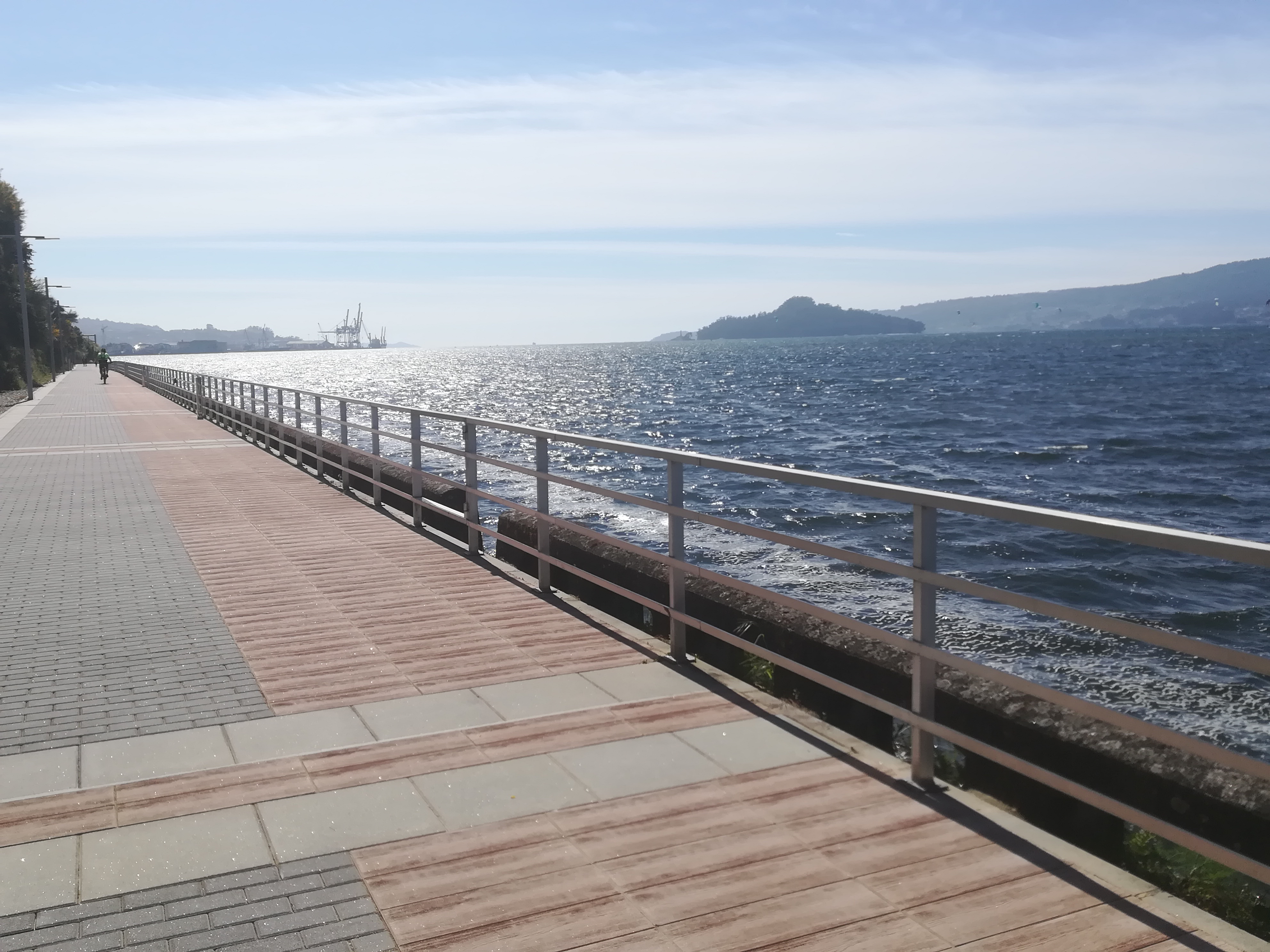
Seafront promenade

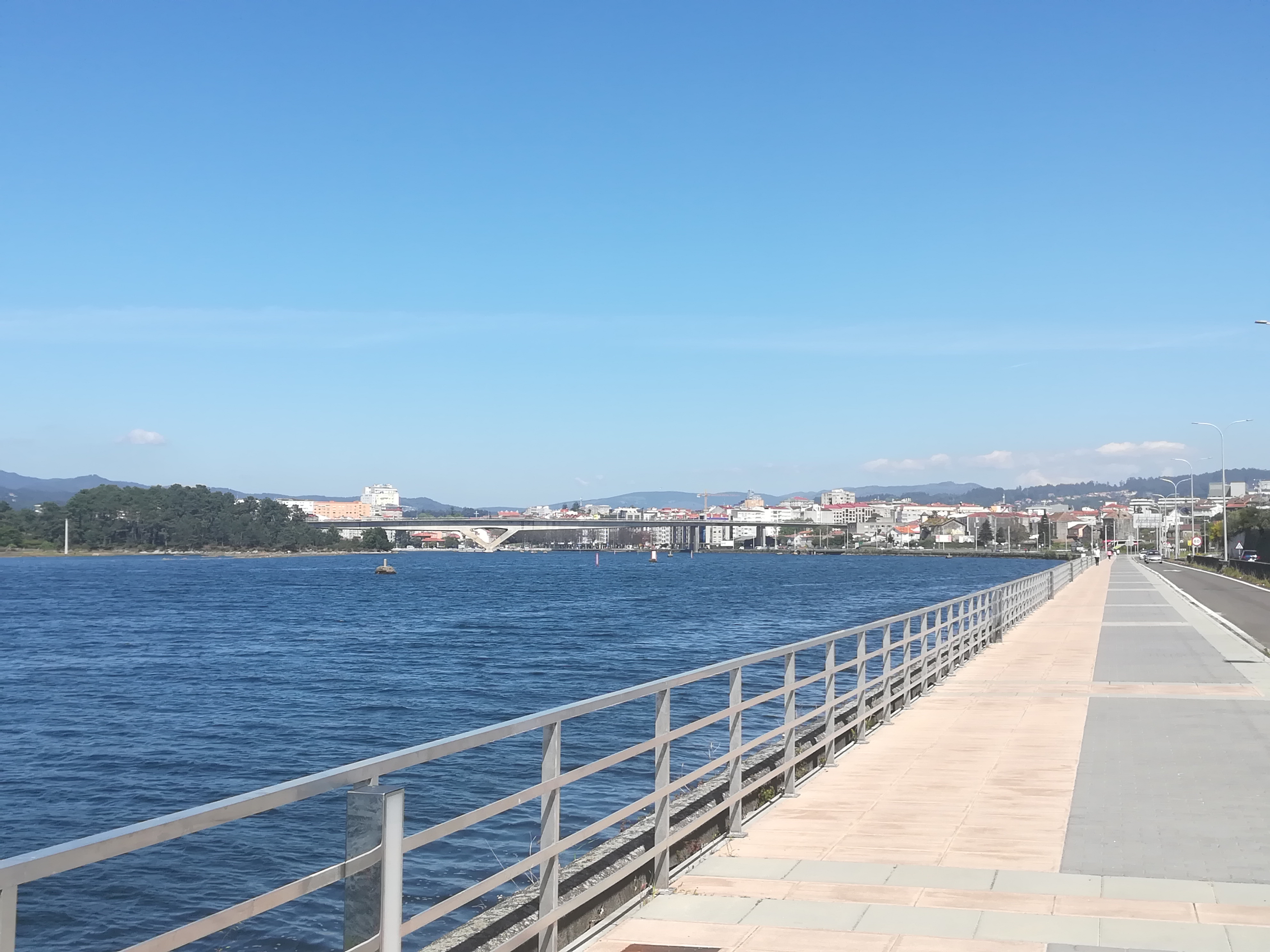
Pontevedra seafront promenade with the city

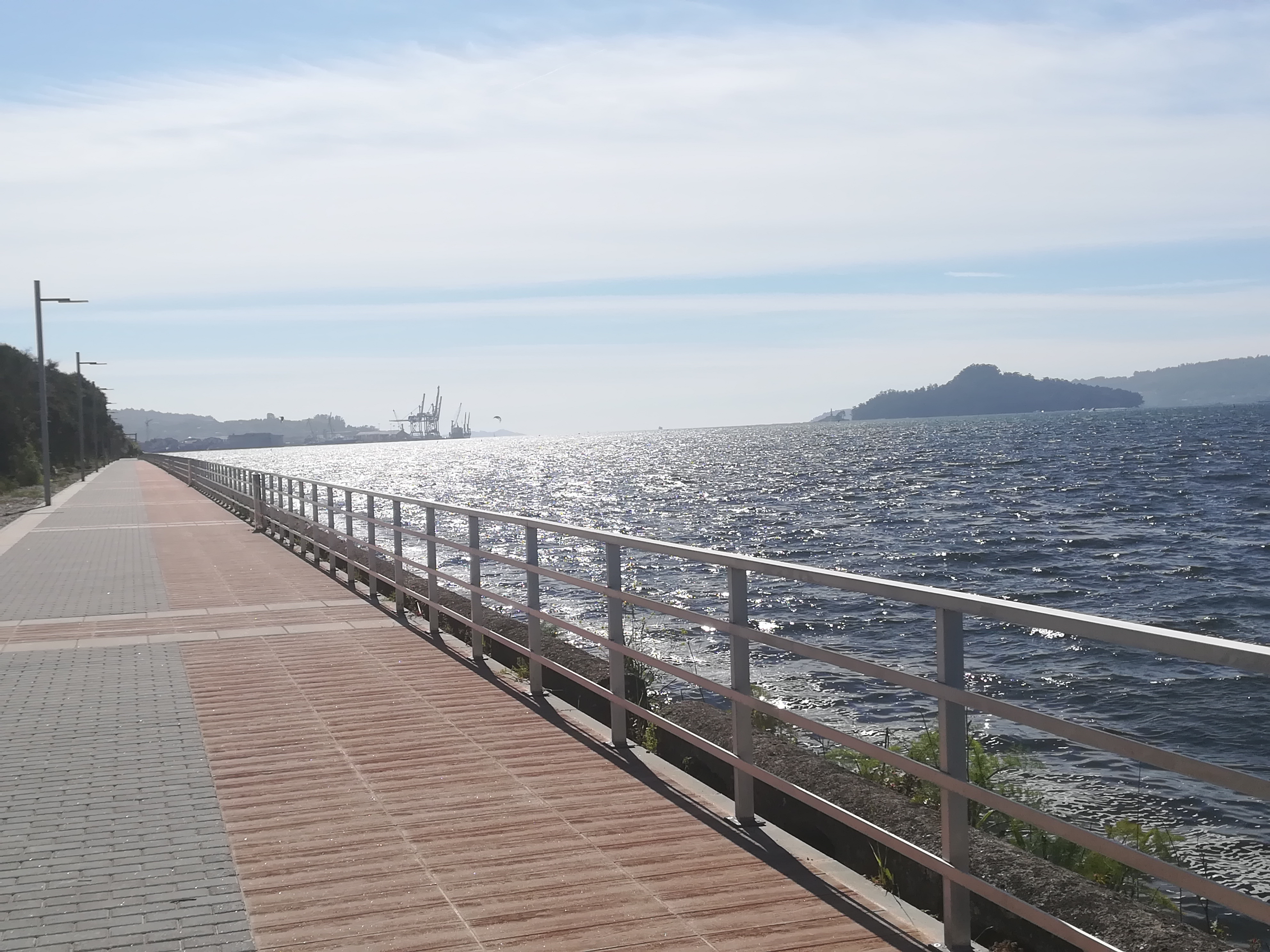
Seafront promenade

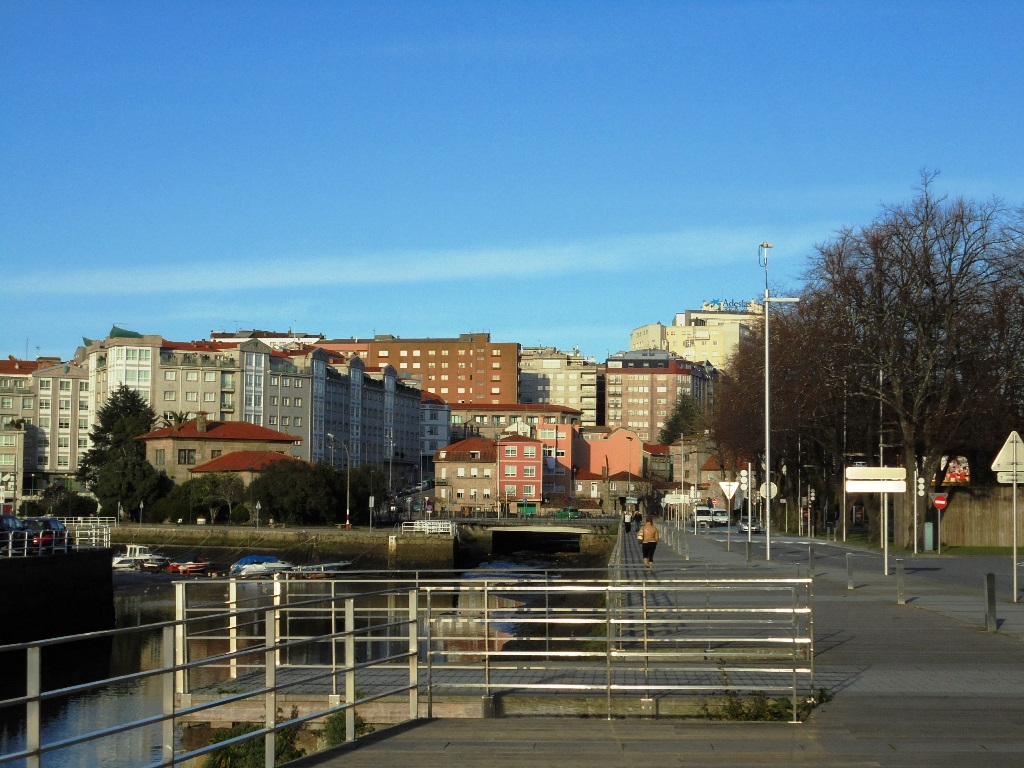
Paseo marítimo

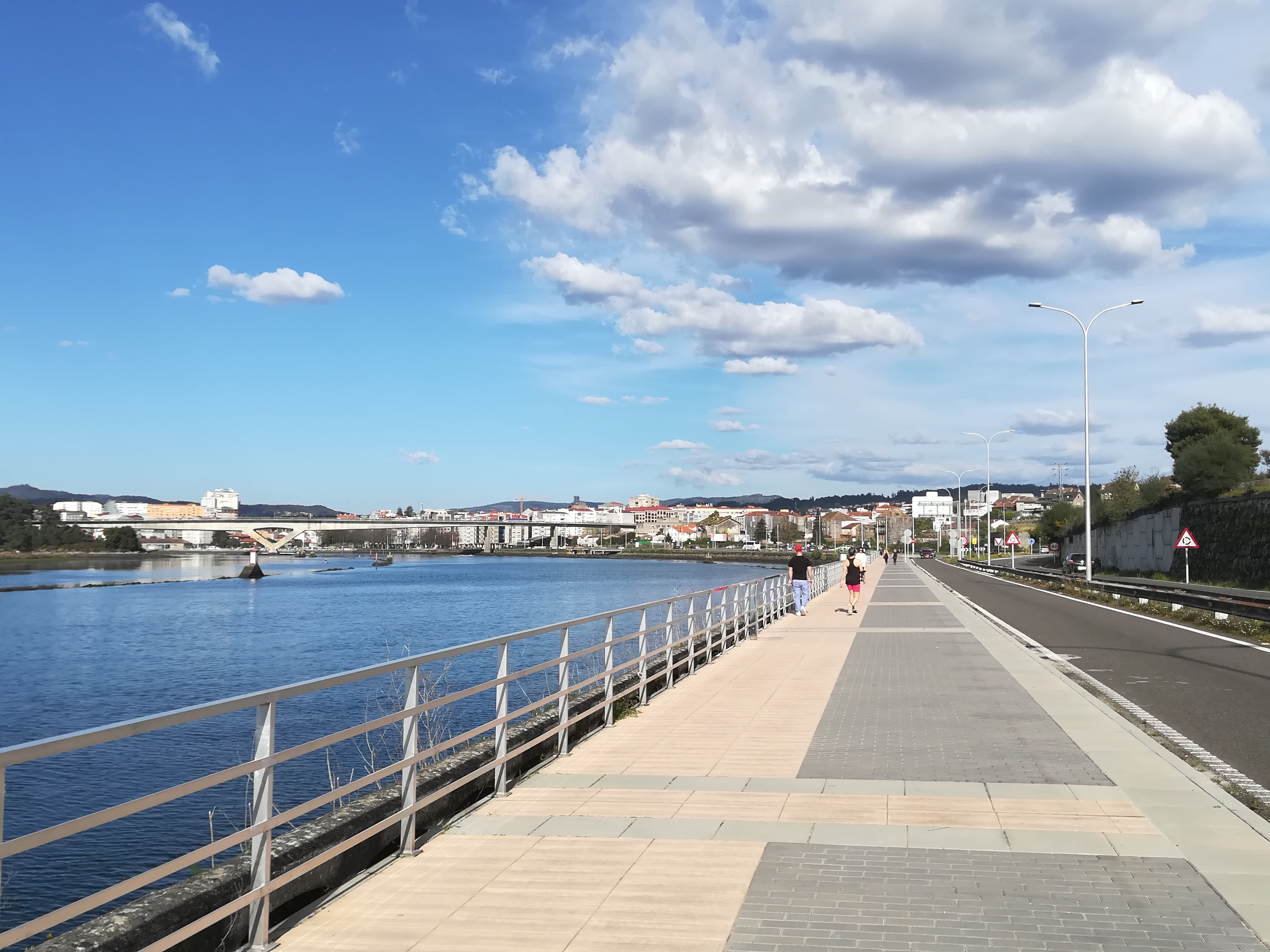
Seafront Promenade with the city in the background

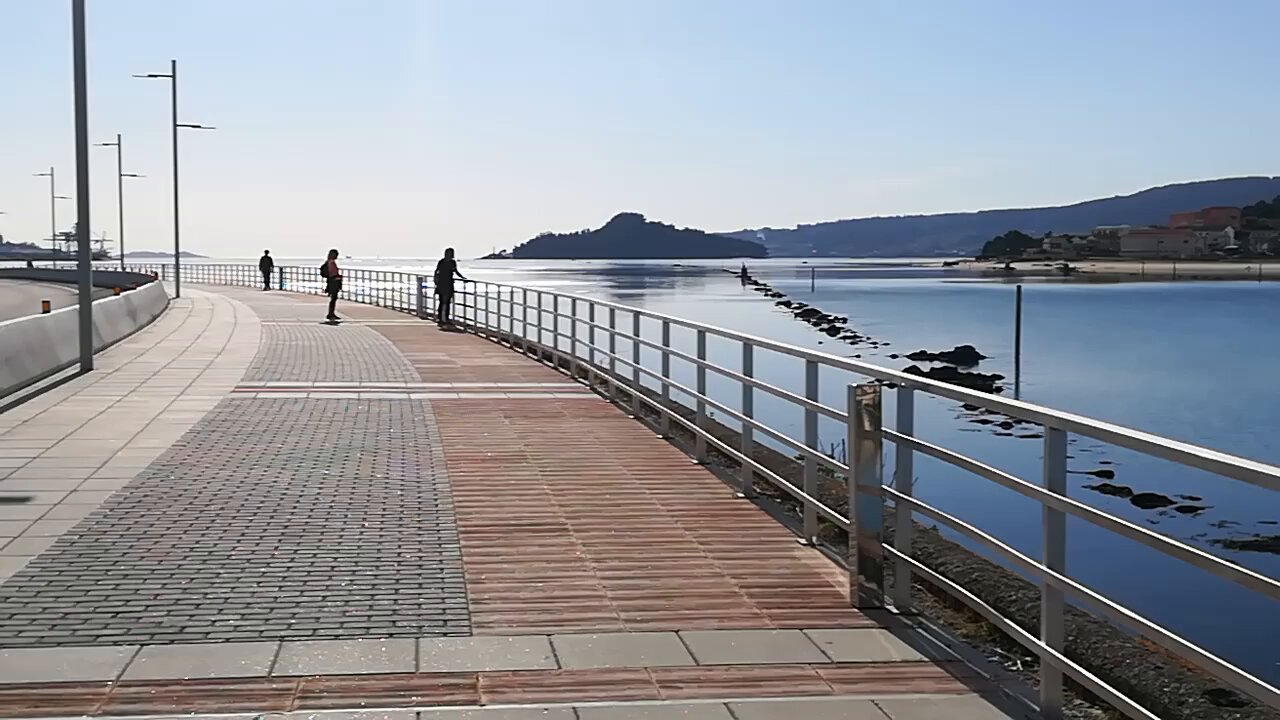
Seafront promenade and Tambo Island

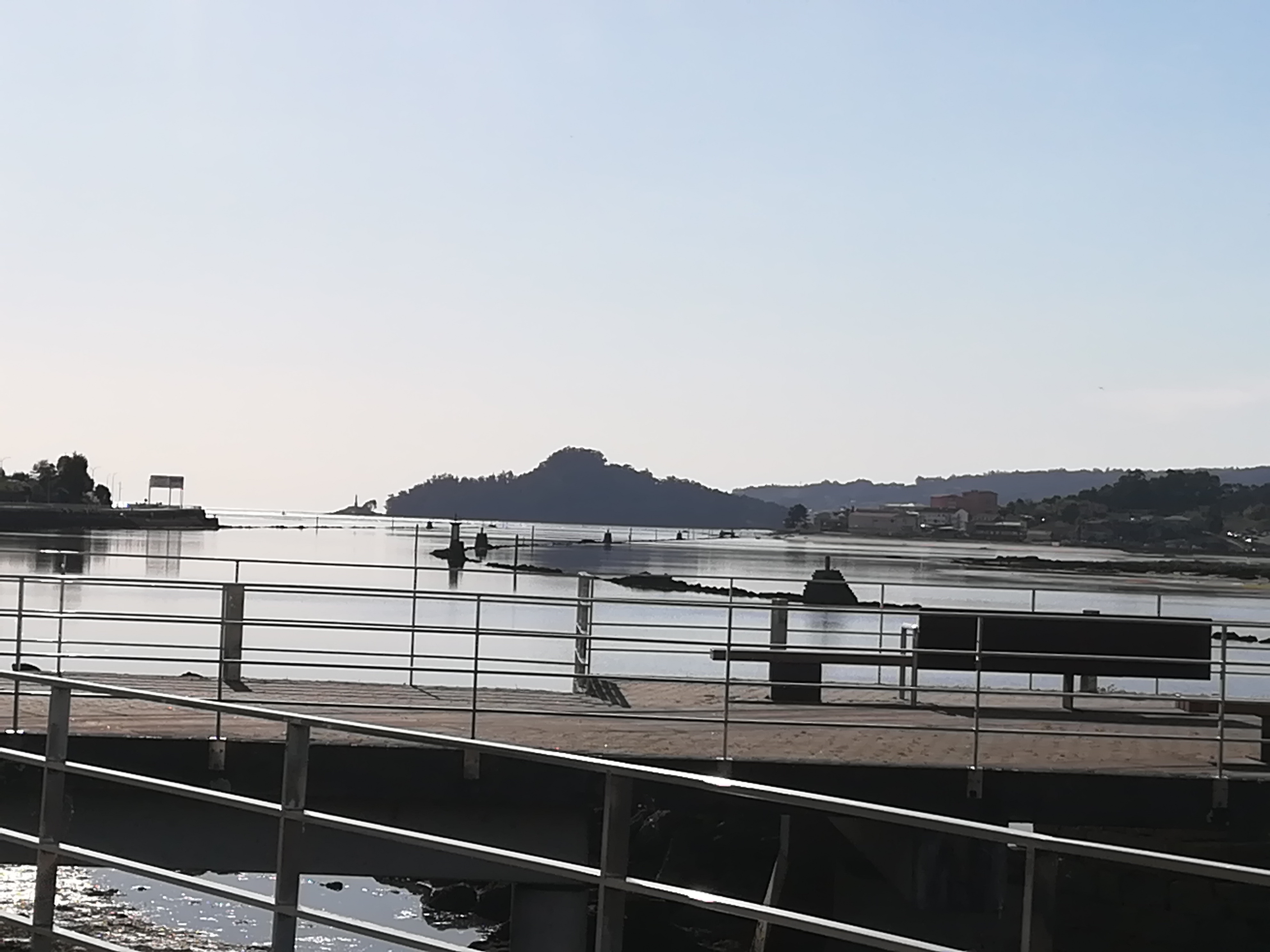
Seafront promenade and viewpoint

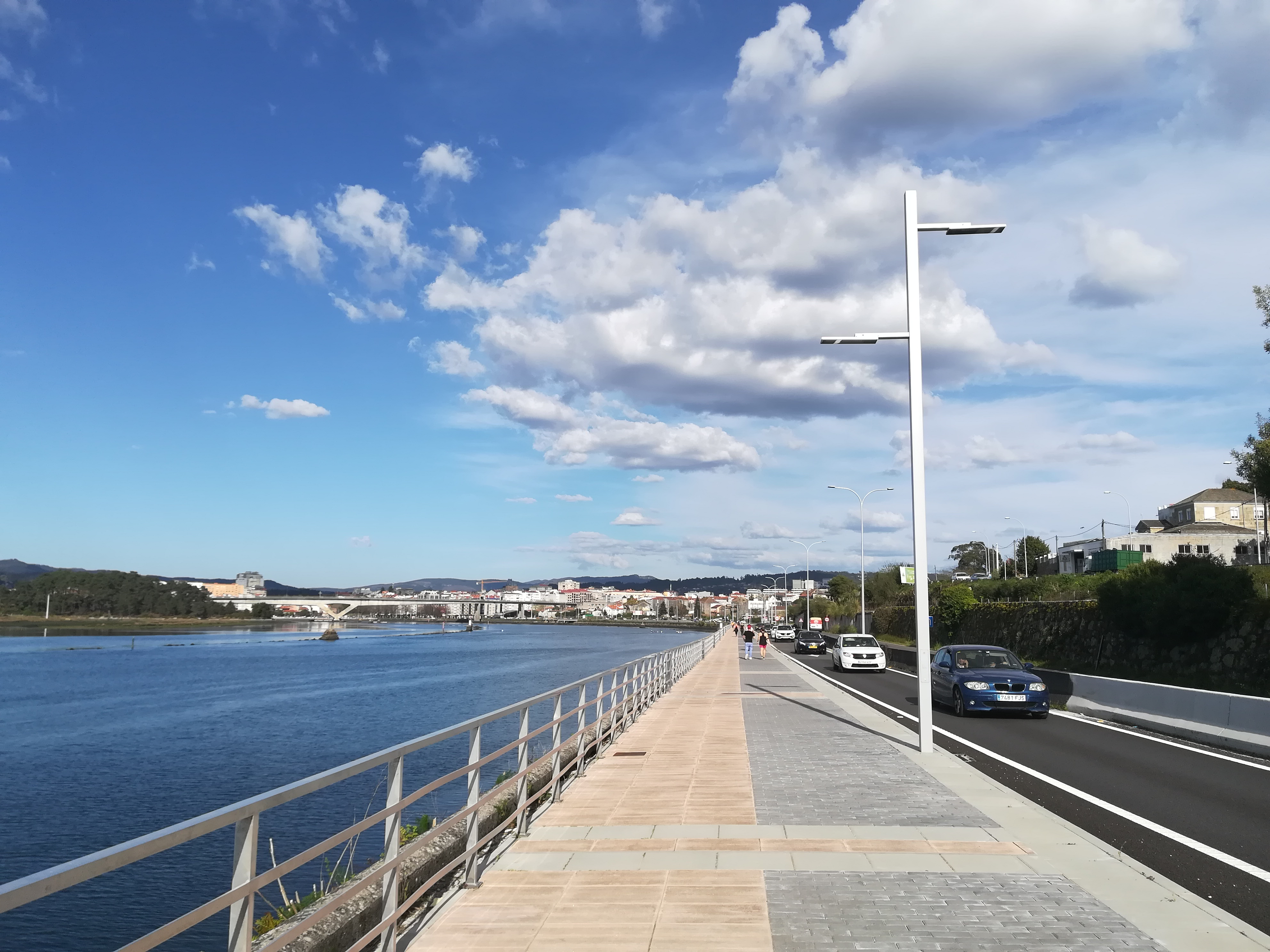
Seafront promenade

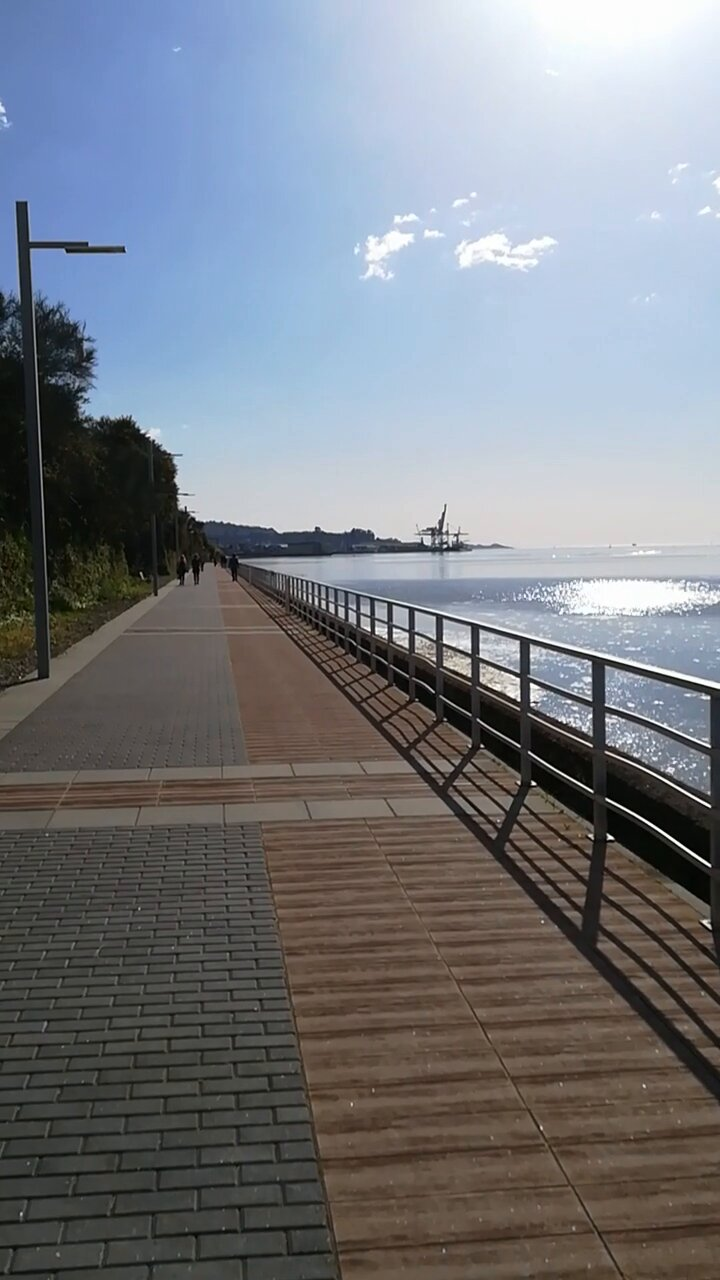
Seafront promenade and shipyards in the background

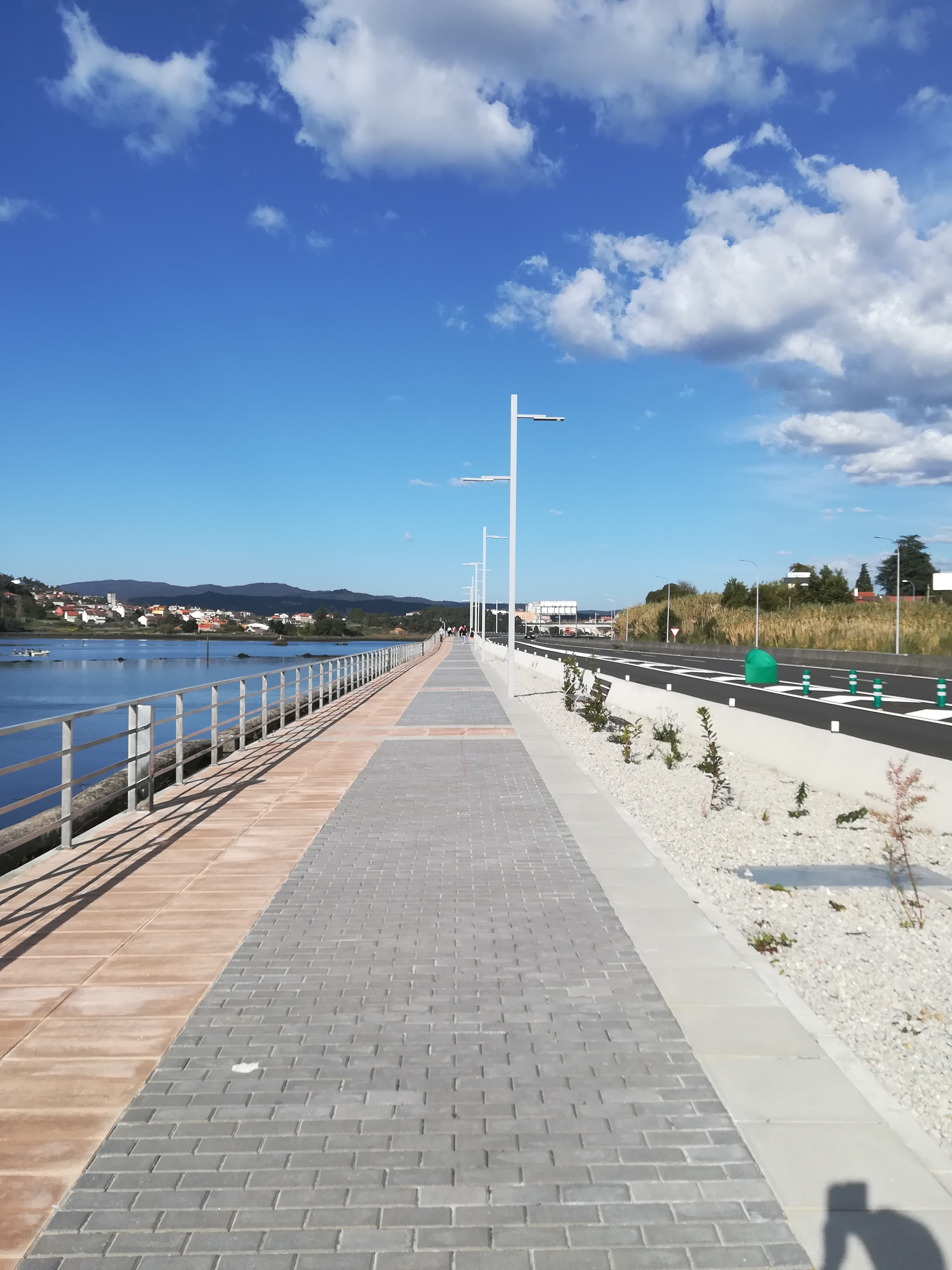
Seafront promenade

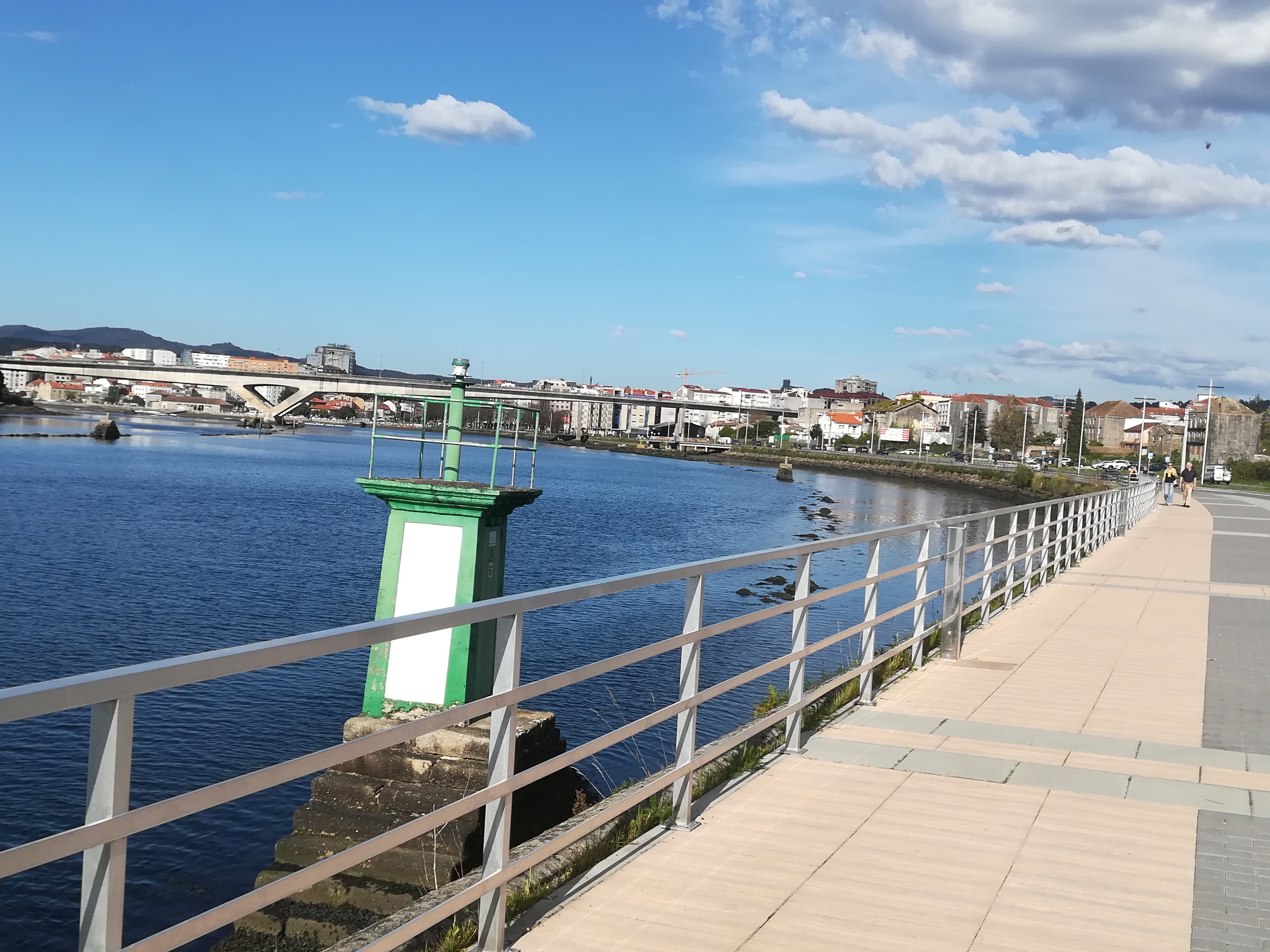
Seafront promenade and the city

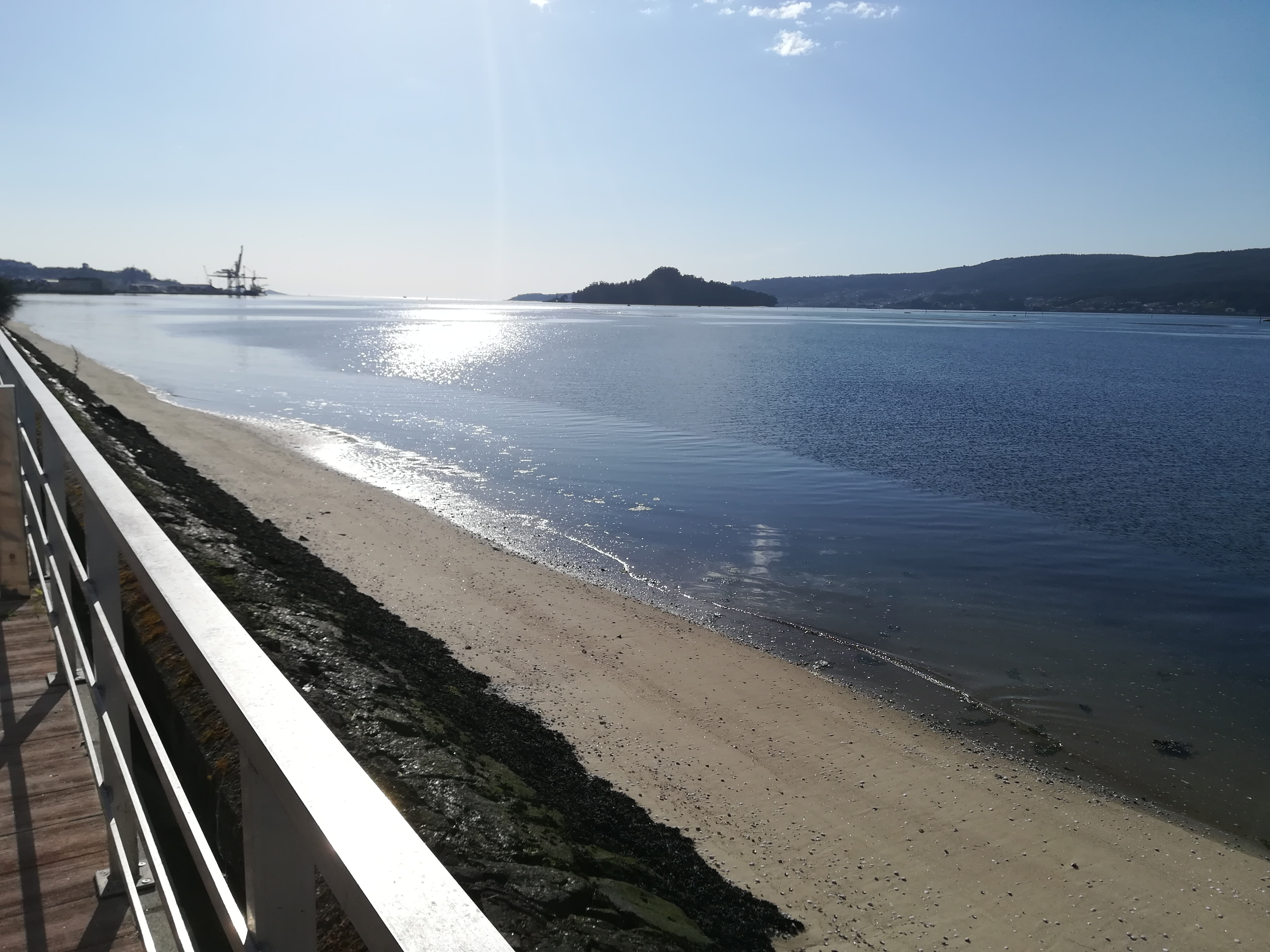
Seafront promenade and Ria de Pontevedra

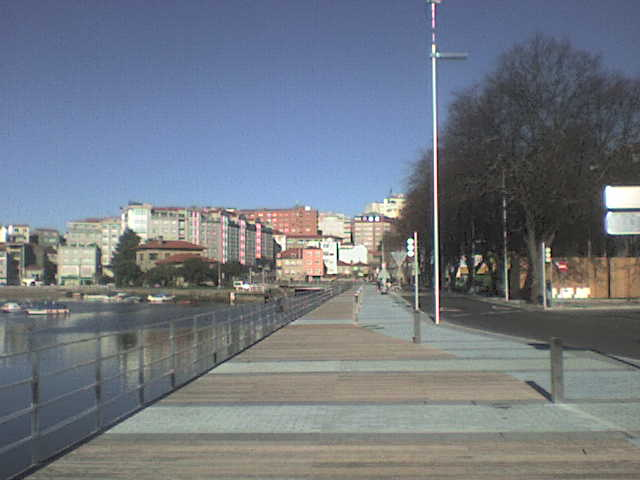
Paseo marítimo

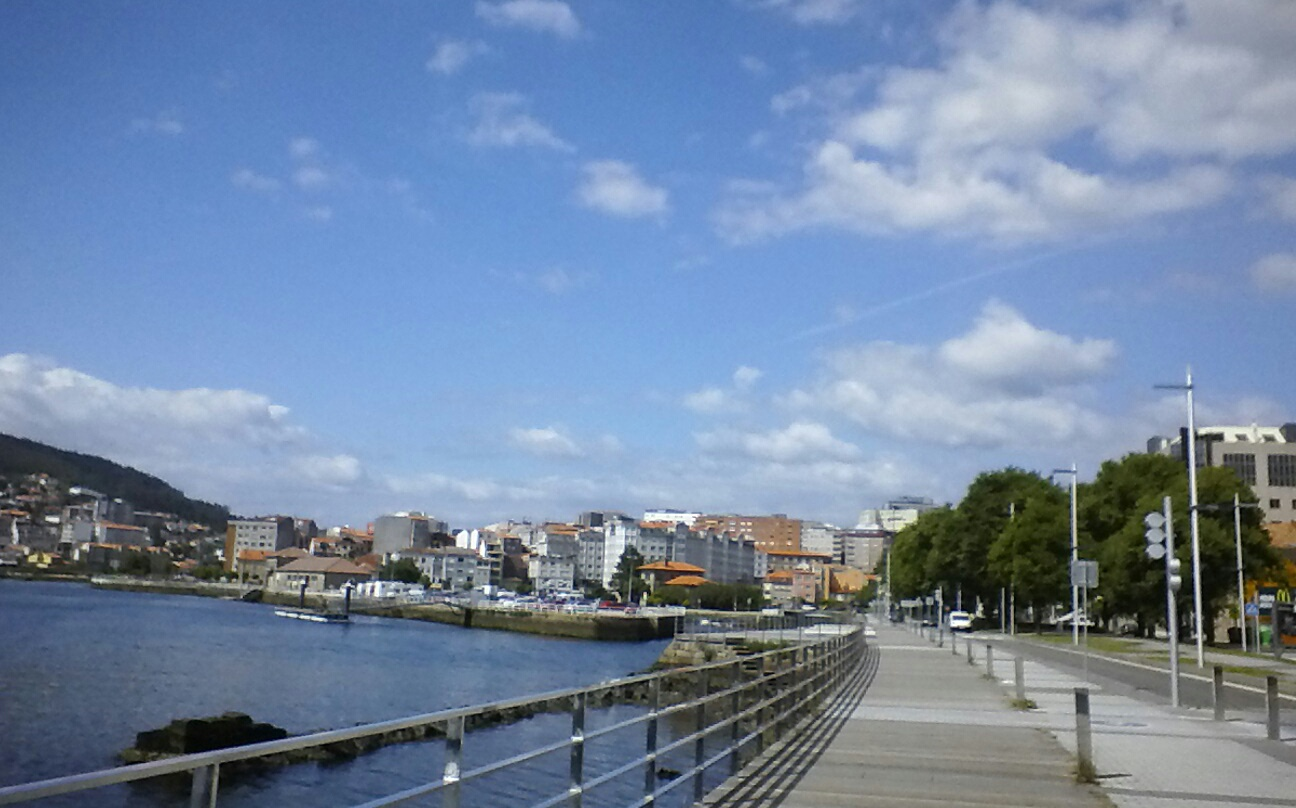
Paseo marítimo

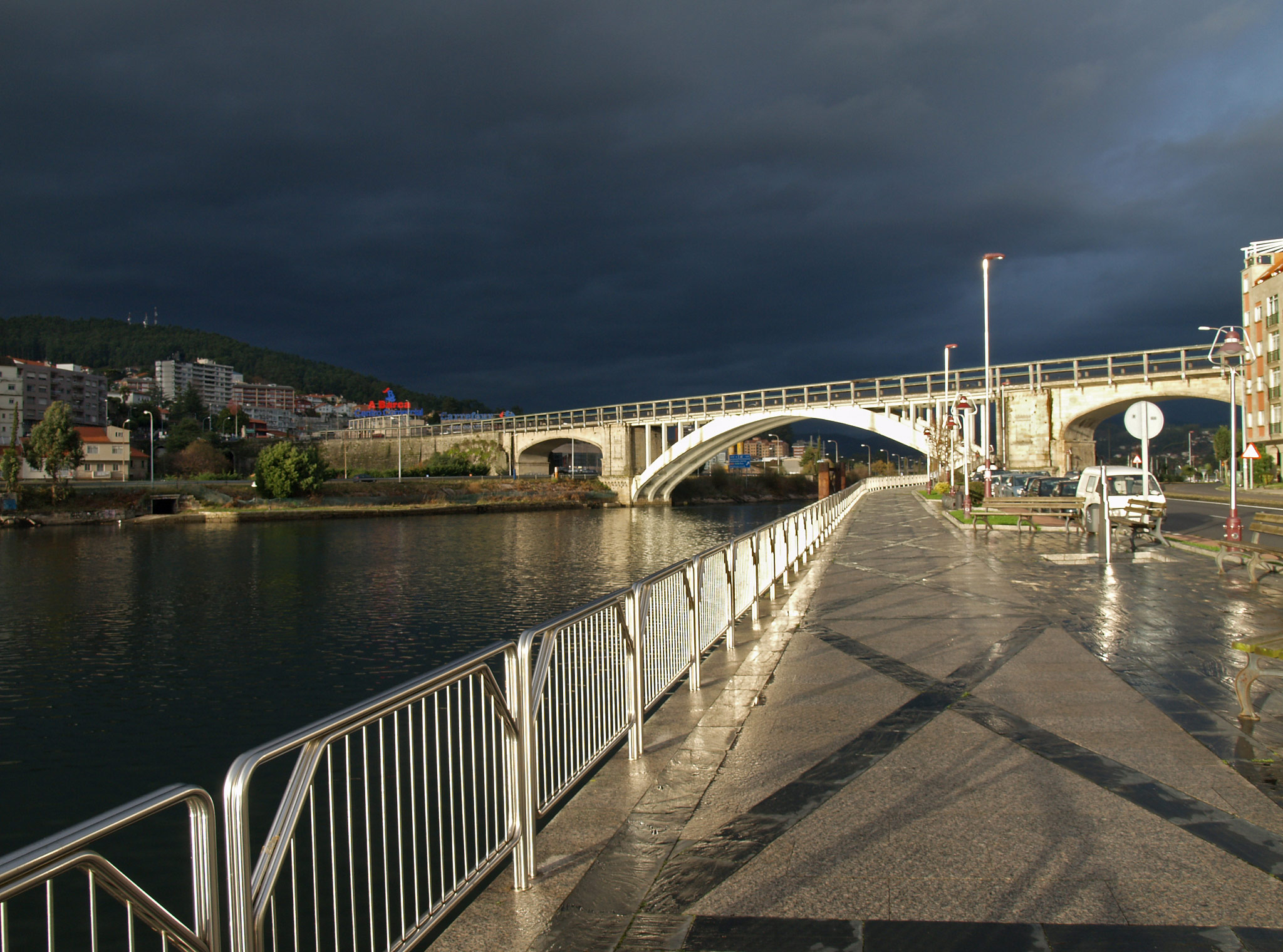
Paseo de Orillamar and Barca Bridge

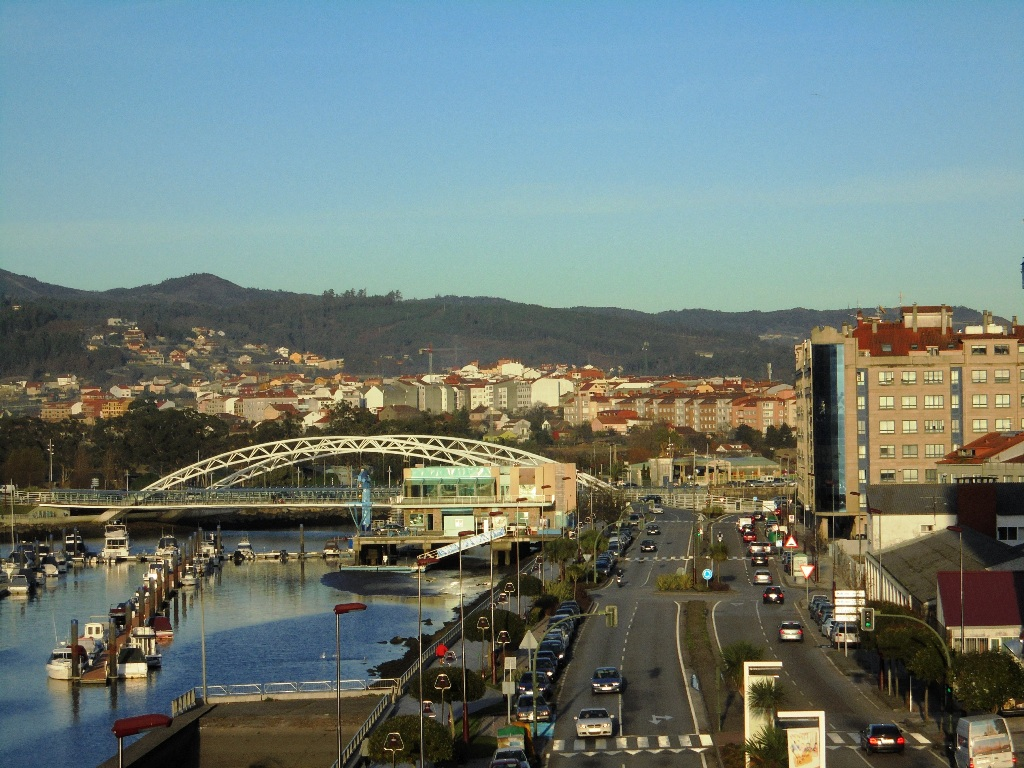
Paseo de Orillamar and Currents Bridge

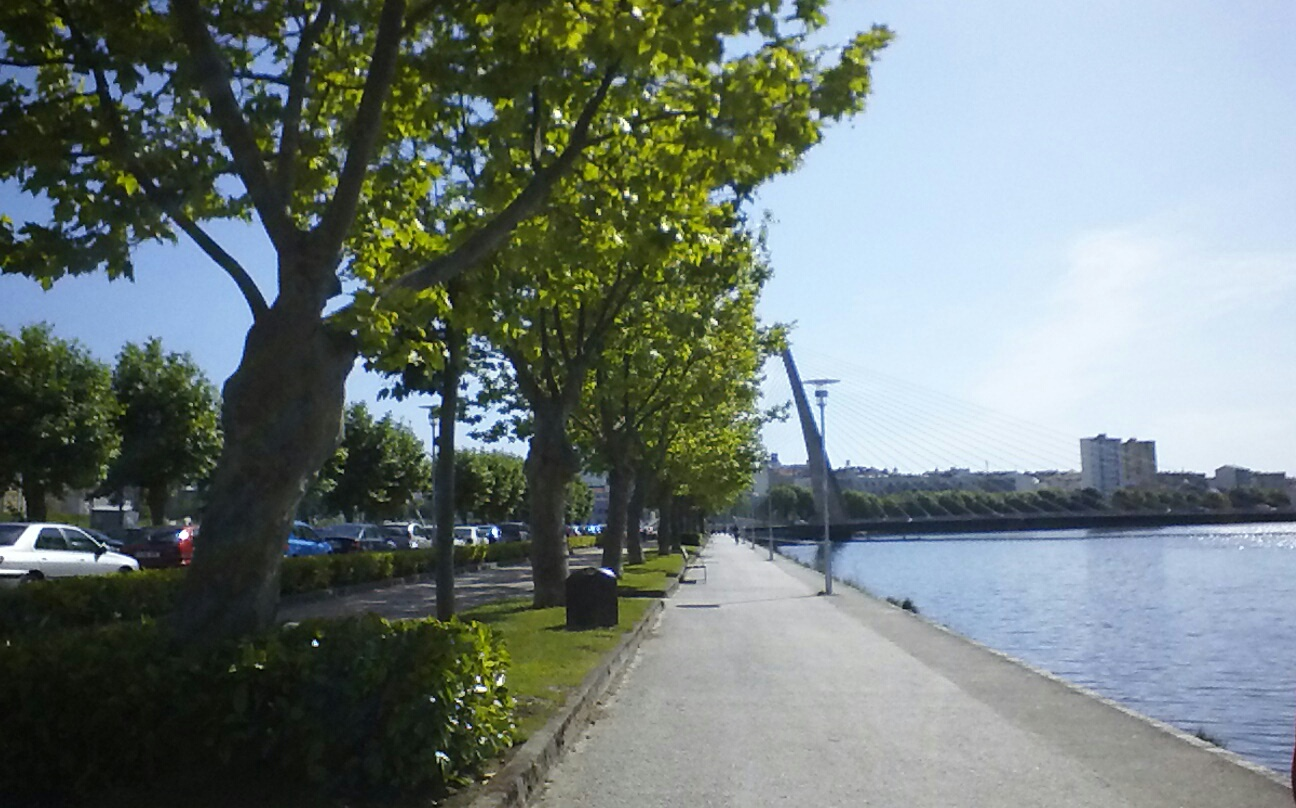
Paseo del Lérez

== See also ==
=== Related articles ===
- Barca Bridge
- Currents Bridge
- Pontevedra marina
- Mollavao

=== External links ===
- (gl) Los puentes de Pontevedra on the website Tesouros no tempo.
