= Tambo Island =

Island in Pontevedra, Spain

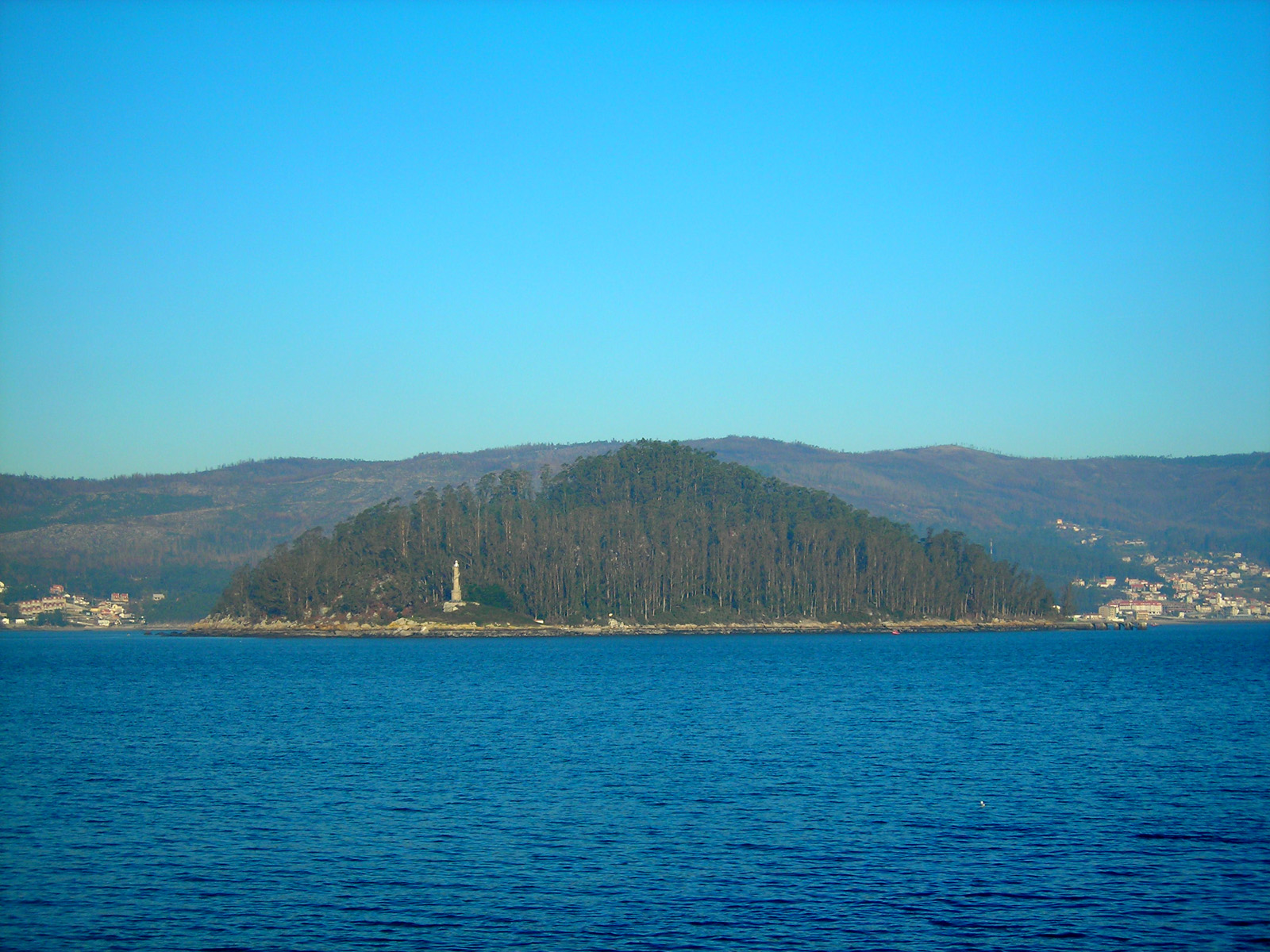
- Tambo Island

- Location within Spain

Geography
- Coordinates: 42°24′42.7″N 8°42′32.6″W
- Area: 0.28 km^{2} (0.11 sq mi)
- Length: 4 km (2.5 mi)
- Highest elevation: 80 m (260 ft)

Administration
- Spain
- Autonomous community: Galicia
- Province: Pontevedra
- Municipality: Poio

Tambo Island is an island in the middle of Pontevedra Bay on the Atlantic coast of Spain. It is part of the municipality of Poio, from which it is separated by a shallow, 1.1-kilometre-wide (0.7-mile) channel. Its surface area is 0.28 km^{2} (0.11 sq mi), with a maximum elevation of 80 metres (262 feet), although its entire central part is over 50 metres (164 feet) high. It has a coastline of 4 kilometres (2.5 mi).

== History ==
Among the various prehistoric remains on the island is a castro, which occupies the entire central part of the island and is listed by the General Direction of Heritage with the code GA36041043.

A chapel was built in the 6th century, founded by Martín de Dumio. Fructuosus of Braga turned it into a monastery, linked to the convent of San Juan de Poyo. It later became a priory, under the patronage of Santa María de Gracia.

In the 12th century, the island of Tambo belonged to Queen Urraca and was donated to the convent of San Juan de Poyo. The inhabitants of Combarro used the island for centuries, where they worked their lands and celebrated pilgrimages. In 1589 the chapel was plundered by the corsair Francis Drake, who threw the figure of Santa María de Gracia into the sea.

In 1846, with the Spanish confiscation it ceased to belong to the monks of Poyo and years later it was bought by the Minister of Justice, Eugenio Montero Ríos. In the same century, a lazaretto was built on the island, which between 1865 and 1879 was used to quarantine sailors arriving at the port of Marín-Pontevedra. Due to protests from the citizens of Pontevedra, the infirmary was moved to the island of San Simón, in the Vigo estuary, and in 1889 the island became a military penitentiary.

With the creation of the Marín Naval Military School in 1943, the island was militarised and came to be used as an arsenal. It was in that year that the heirs of Montero Ríos sold the island to the Spanish Navy. Until 2005, the heirs continued to be listed as owners of one fifth of the island.

The Spanish Navy ceased to classify the island as a strategic enclave in 2002, which raised expectations that it could be ceded to the Xunta de Galicia and incorporated into the Atlantic Islands of Galicia National Park, for which it would first have to be declared a natural park. However, the island remains under military jurisdiction.

On 14 April 2013, a group of Combarro residents made a symbolic declaration of independence of the island as an act of protest against the state of neglect it suffered after demilitarisation. In October 2018, after a period of closure of the island that lasted two years, the Naval School began again to allow organised visits to the island.

The island ceased to be a military enclave on 1 March 2022, opening it to the civilian population.

== Description ==
The island has a surface area of 28 hectares (69 acres) and reaches an altitude of 80 metres (262 feet) on Mount San Facundo. It is oval and has a typical pyramidal shape, completely covered with trees, especially eucalyptus. On its southern side there is a small peninsula (on which there is an old lighthouse) which gives it its characteristic shape.

There is a former naval ammunition dump, a chapel, and a former lazaretto on the island. There are no inhabited buildings.

The island has two beaches that are only accessible by private boat. At the northeastern end of the island is Area da Illa, the largest and most popular beach. The other, smaller beach is Adreira. It is located on the eastern side of the island. It is a sheltered cove of white sand, bordered by rocks and a lush pine forest.

The island can be seen from a large part of the Paseo Marítimo de Pontevedra, the seafront promenade of the city of Pontevedra.

== Gallery ==
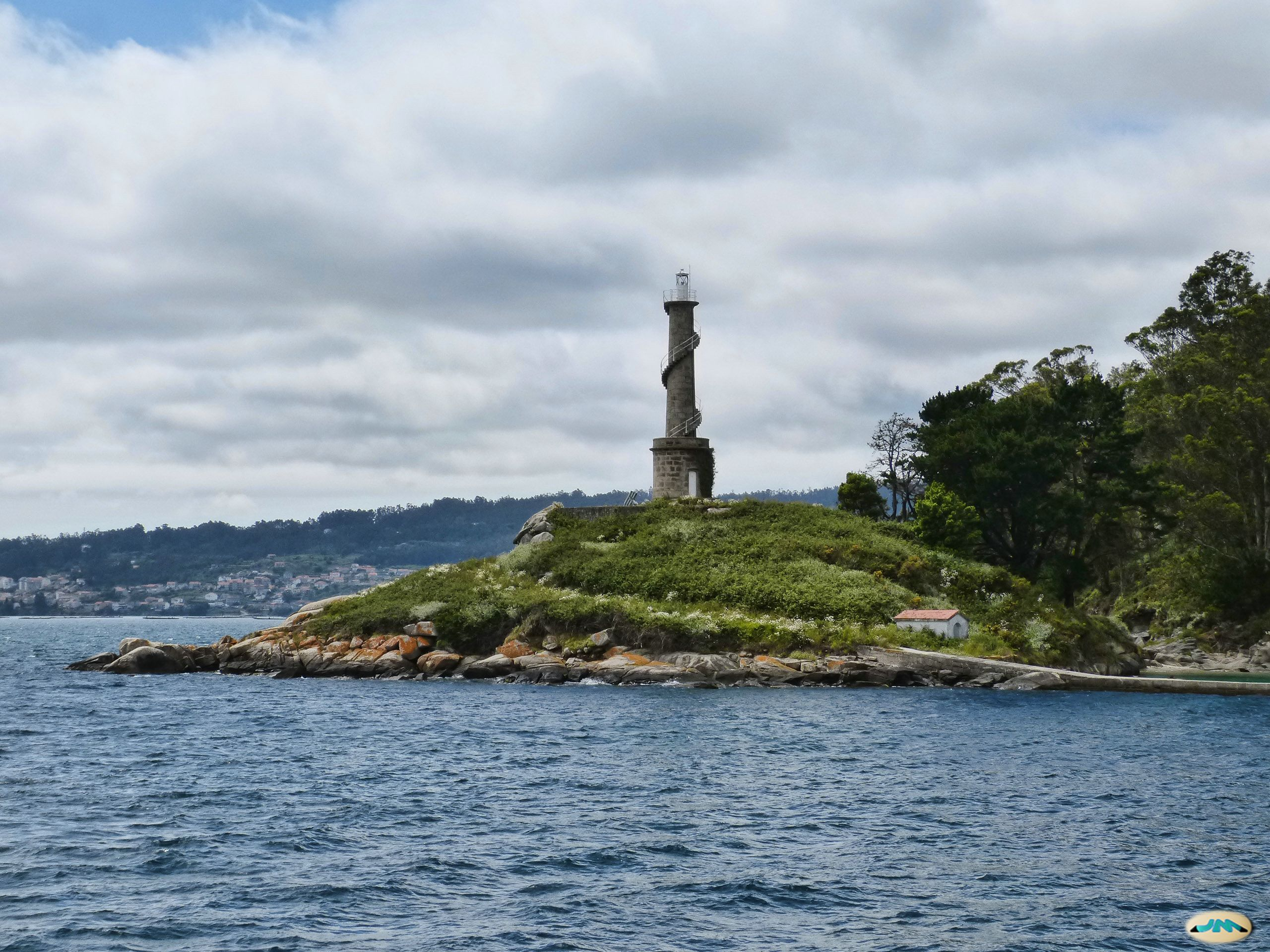
Lighthouse on the island

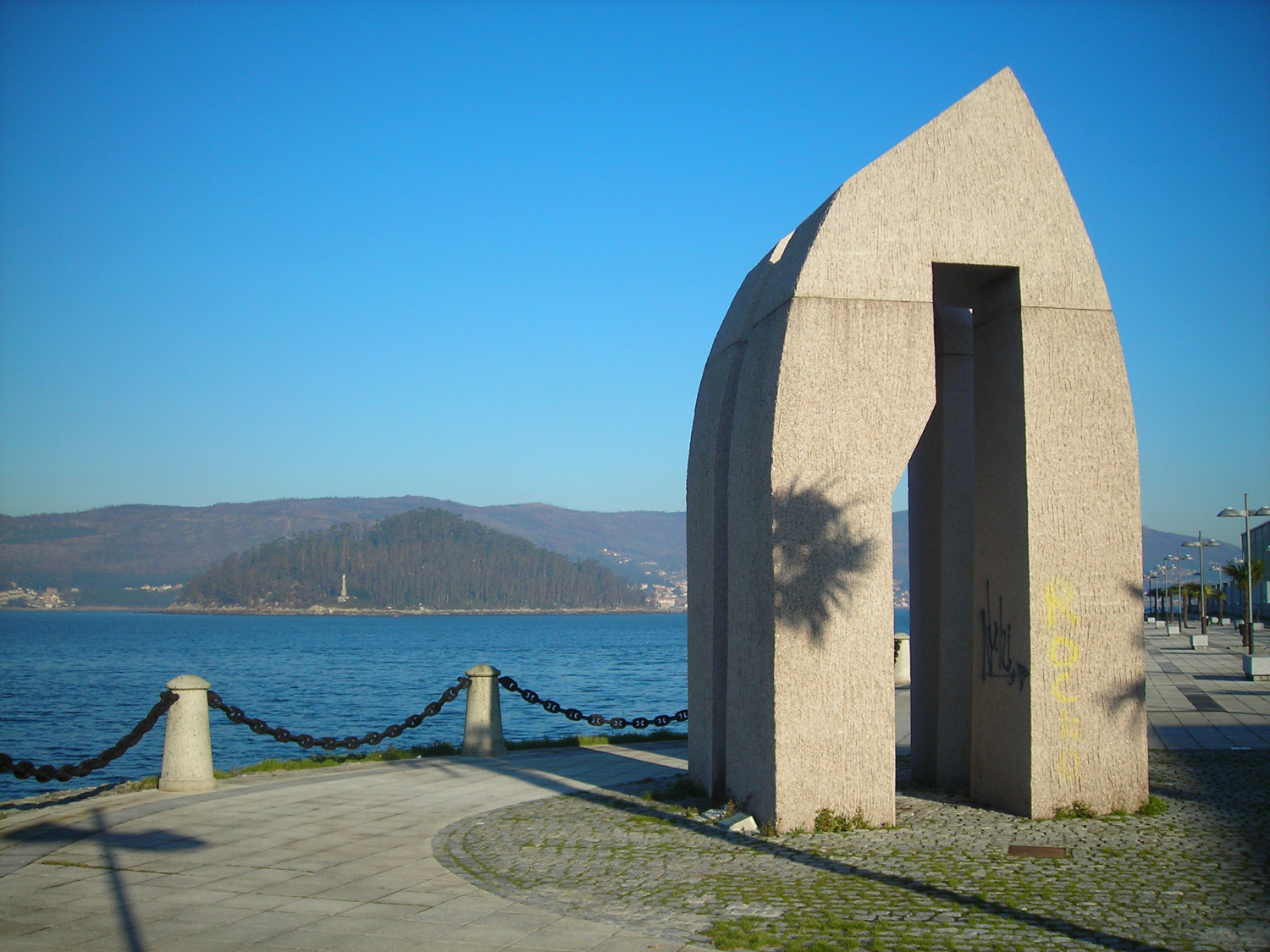
Sculpture on the harbour promenade with the island of Tambo in the background.

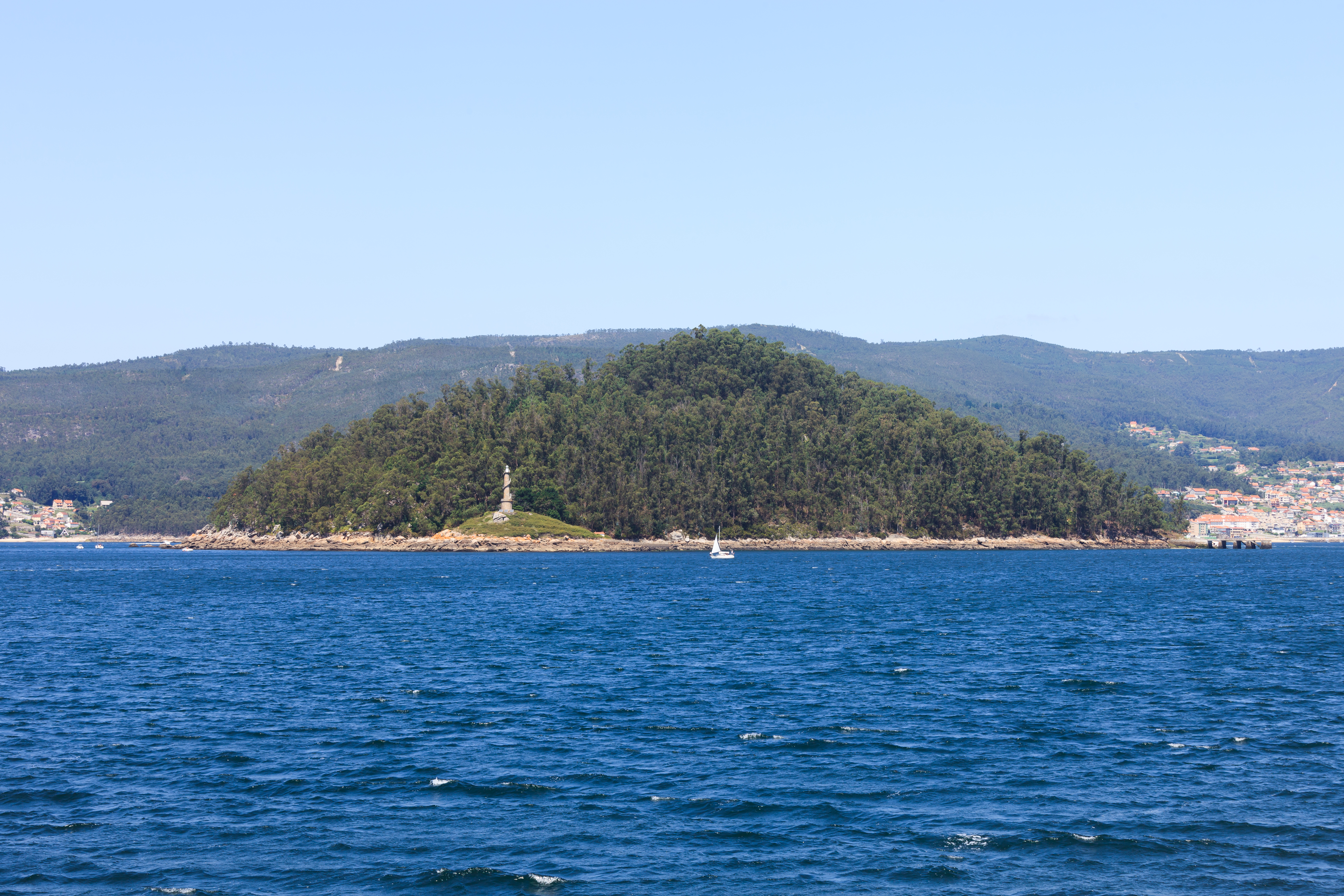
Tambo Island

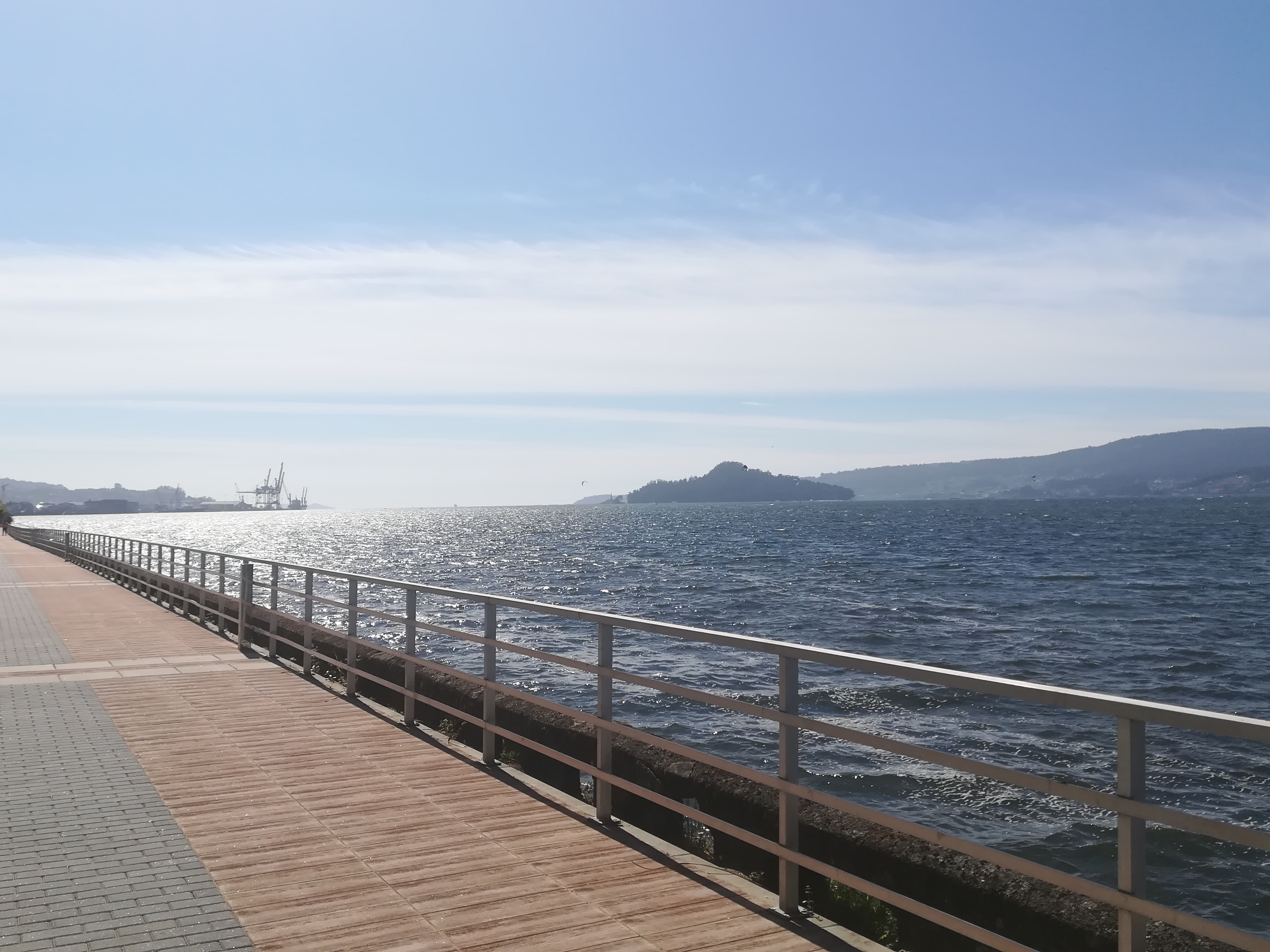
View of the island from the Pontevedra city seafront promenade

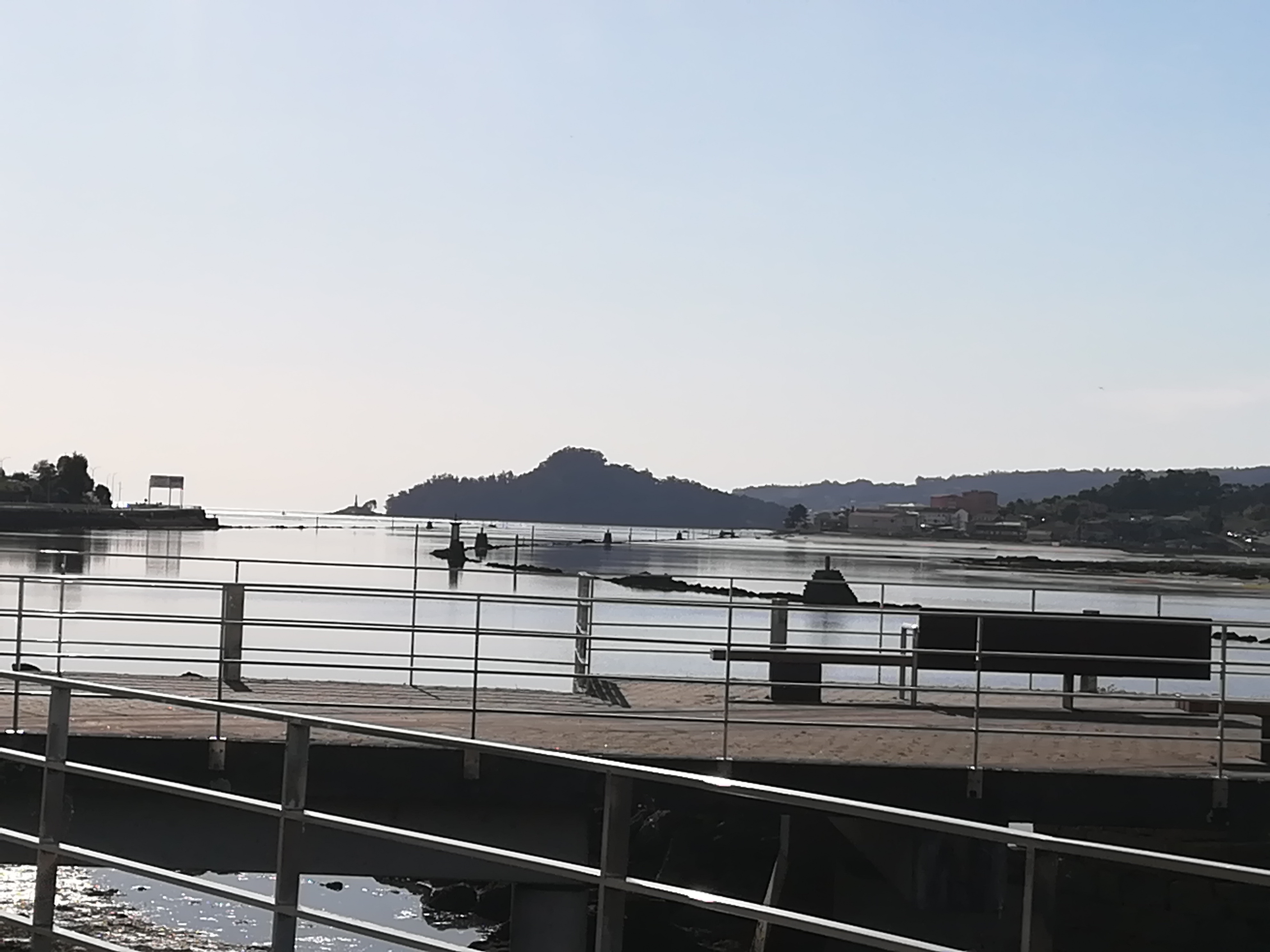
View of the island from the viewpoint of the seafront promenade of Pontevedra.

== See also ==
=== Bibliography ===
- Illas de Galicia. Cíes, Ons, Sálvora, Tambo, San Simón e Cortegada. 1991. ISBN 84-7507-582-7.

=== Related articles ===
- Ria de Pontevedra

=== External links ===
- "Strategic agenda for Tambo Island". 16 December 2019. Archived from the original on 27 April 2019.
- Isla de Tambo on the website Terras de Pontevedra.
