= Pontevedra marina =

Port in Pontevedra, Spain

Pontevedra Marina
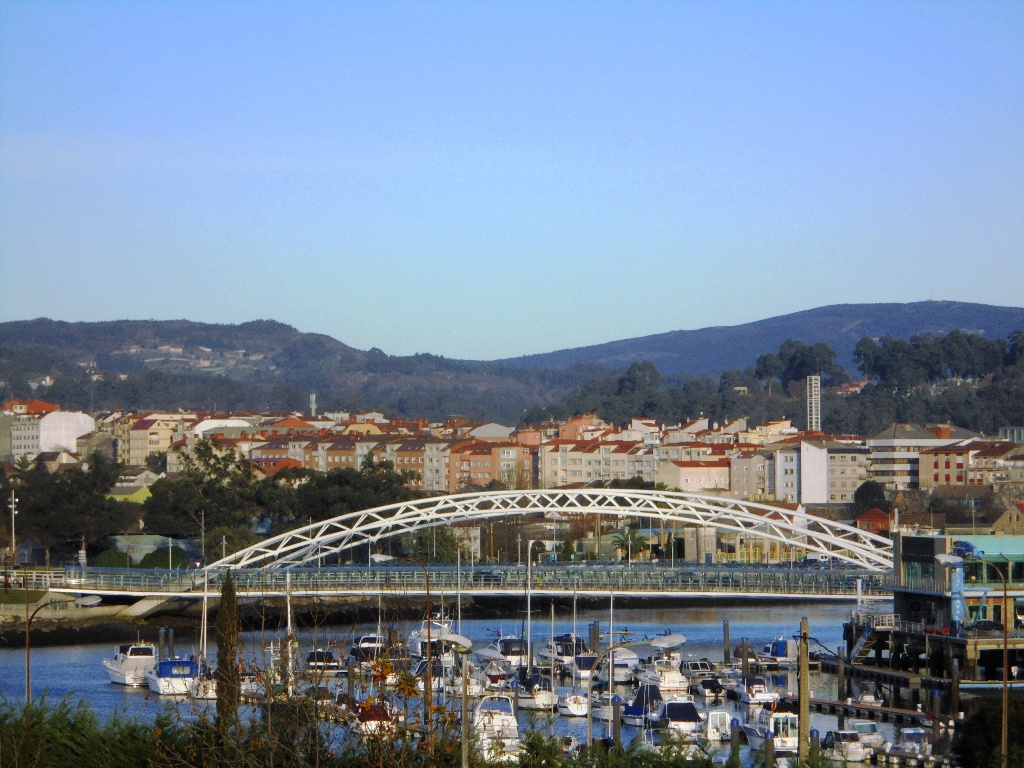
- Pontevedra marina and Currents Bridge
- Click on the map for a fullscreen view

Location
- Country: Spain
- Location: Pontevedra
- Coordinates: 42.4355°N 8.6503°W

Details
- City: Pontevedra

Statistics
- Website

The marina of Pontevedra (Pontevedra, Spain) is located at the mouth of the Lérez river in the ria de Pontevedra. Its nautical chart is 4162-HMI. It is managed by the Nautical Club of Pontevedra, by concession of the public entity of the Ports of Galicia – South Zone.

== Location ==
The marina is located in the heart of Pontevedra, on Avenida Uruguay, next to the seafront and very close to the Currents Bridge and the old town.

== History ==
The Pontevedra Nautical Club was founded in 1932 and had swimming, jet-skiing, sailing and water polo sections. Nowadays, only the canoeing and kayaking section remains. The building of the Nautical Club was built in 1992.

This is a flood of the Lérez in 1987, caused by a deep squall, which triggered the project to build a marina, which the Pontevedra nautical enthusiasts wanted to do. This flood caused the dragging of logs which damaged many boats anchored in the river. This event increased the demands of the sailing club for the construction of a marina, which were supported by its canoeing section.

Work on the marina began in 1994. It was inaugurated in 1996, with three lines of pontoons with 140 berths on each side, almost entirely occupied by the members of the Nautical Club, of which there are 240.

In March 2020, a project was launched in the port to anchor yachts with an accommodation service.

== Description ==
It is a very safe port located in the heart of the city. Its position at the bottom of the ria de Pontevedra, defended by sandy barriers from maritime attacks, has historically marked the city and its population.

The total number of berths in the port is 142. All berths are managed on a rental basis. The draught of the mouth and the quay is 2 metres. The mouth of the navigation channel is marked with green and red lights.

Its services include water and electricity at mooring and anchorage, waiting dock, showers and toilets, surveillance, night lighting, public telephone, radio (VHF 9), sailing club, MARPOL service (oil collection), rubbish collection, taxi, gym, diesel and unleaded fuel and crane.

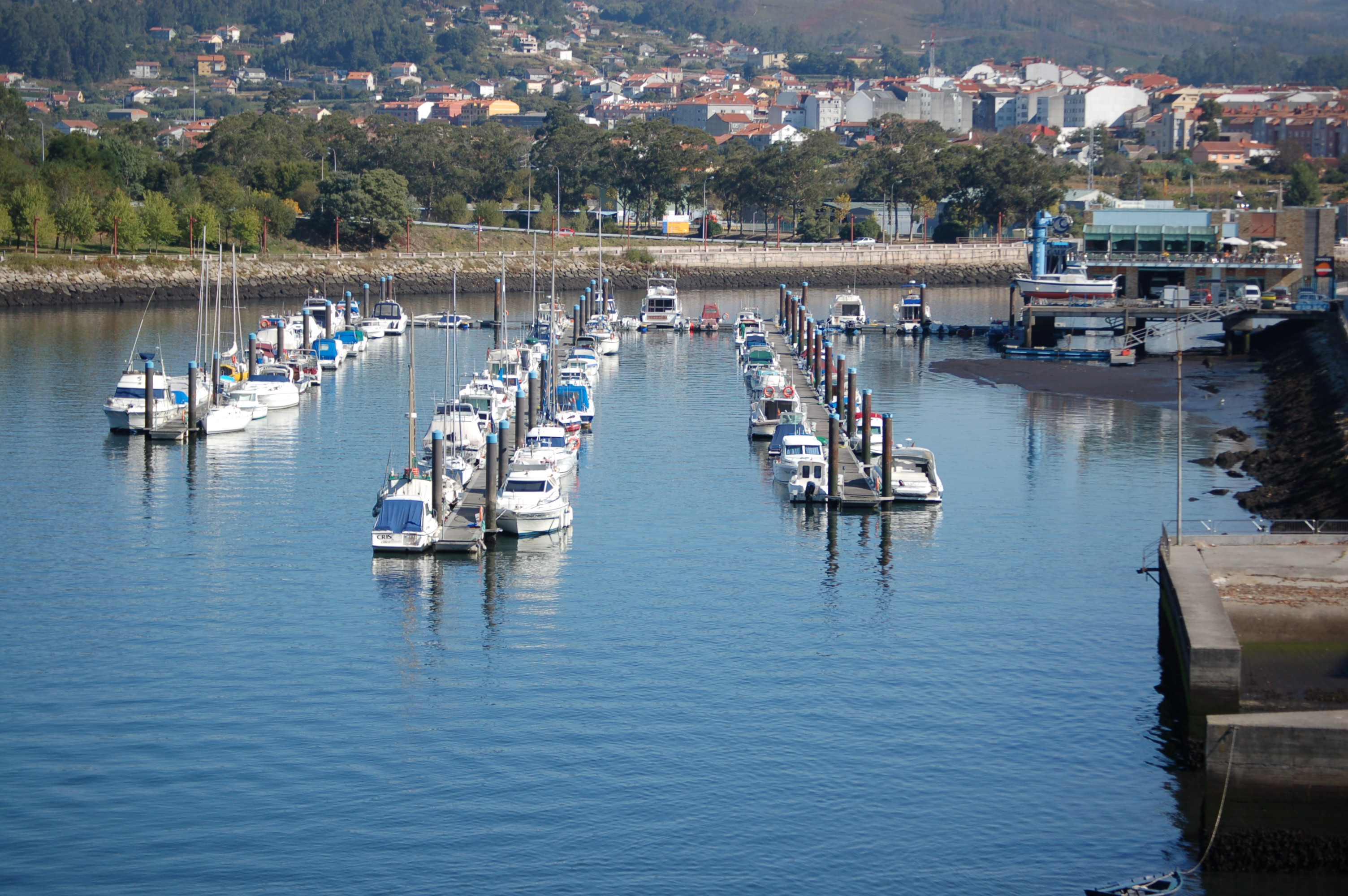
Pontevedra marina, seen from the La Barca Bridge.

The Nautical Club building was inaugurated in 2005 and has a first floor and an upper terrace, both of which offer views of the ria de Pontevedra and the city. The building has a cafeteria.

Despite the dredging of the navigation basin, access to it is currently limited by the lack of draught (2 metres at low tide) and the presence of the Barca bridge, which does not allow the passage of Sailing ships over 12 metres high.

There is currently an emergency project to dredge the ria due to the loss of draught that the port has suffered in recent years.

Until the dredging of the Lérez, the first pontoon is unusable because, at low tide, there is not enough draught for the boats because of the accumulation of mud on the sea bed at the mouth of the Lérez.

== Access ==
By land, it is accessible from the AP-9 motorway, leaving the northern access to Pontevedra, or via Uruguay Avenue, which is next to the port.

== Gallery ==
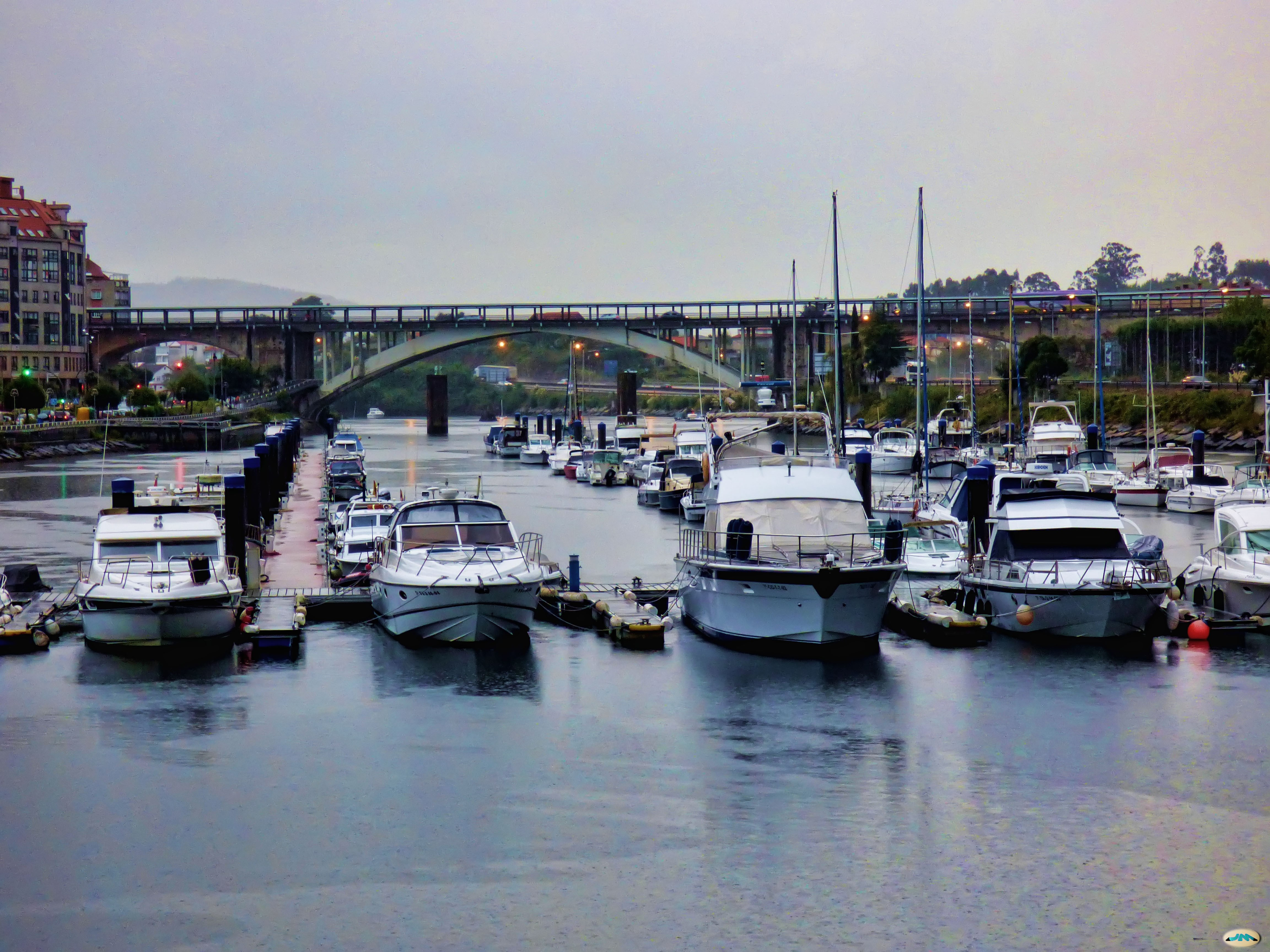
Marina and La Barca Bridge

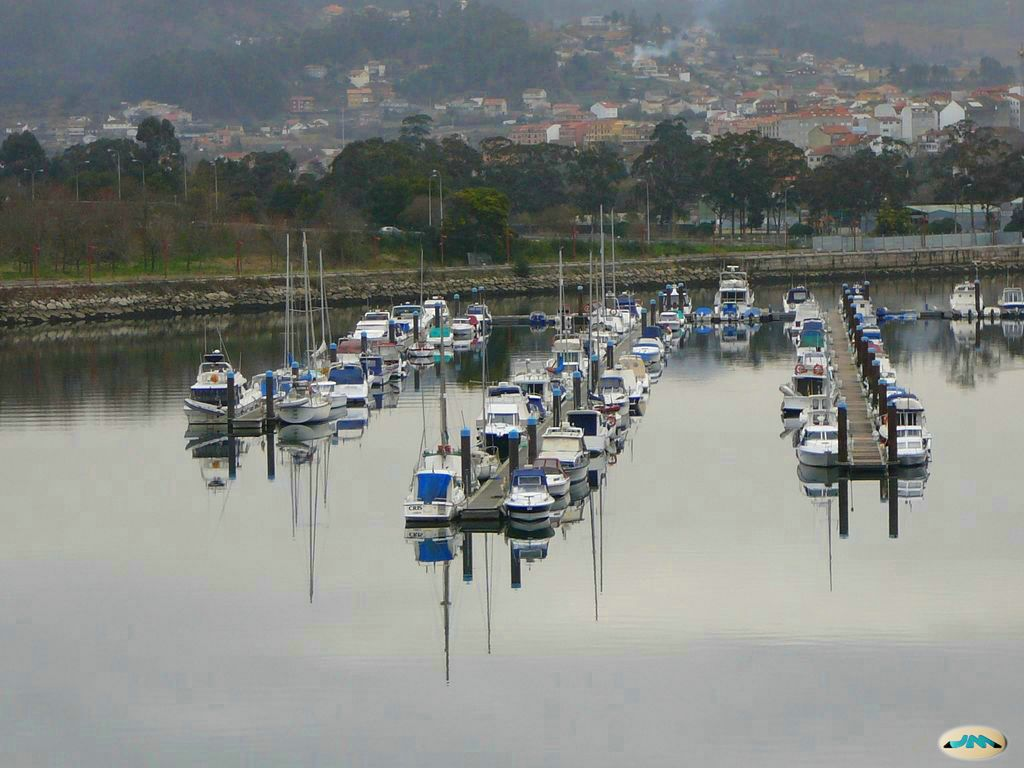
Marina

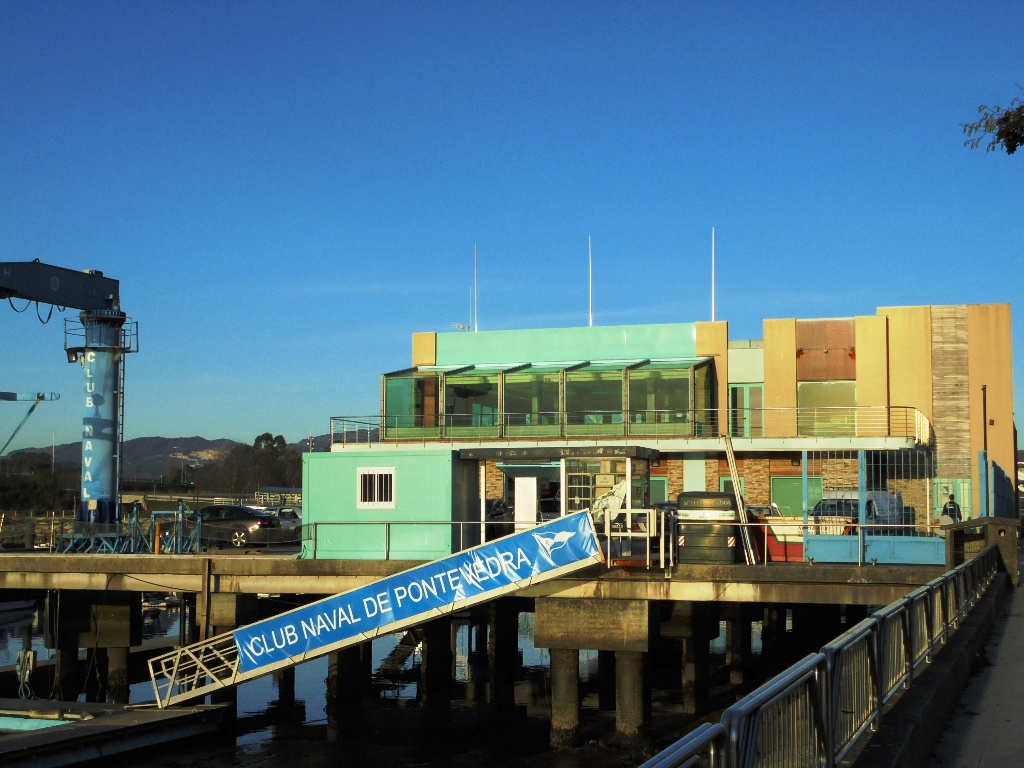
Yacht club

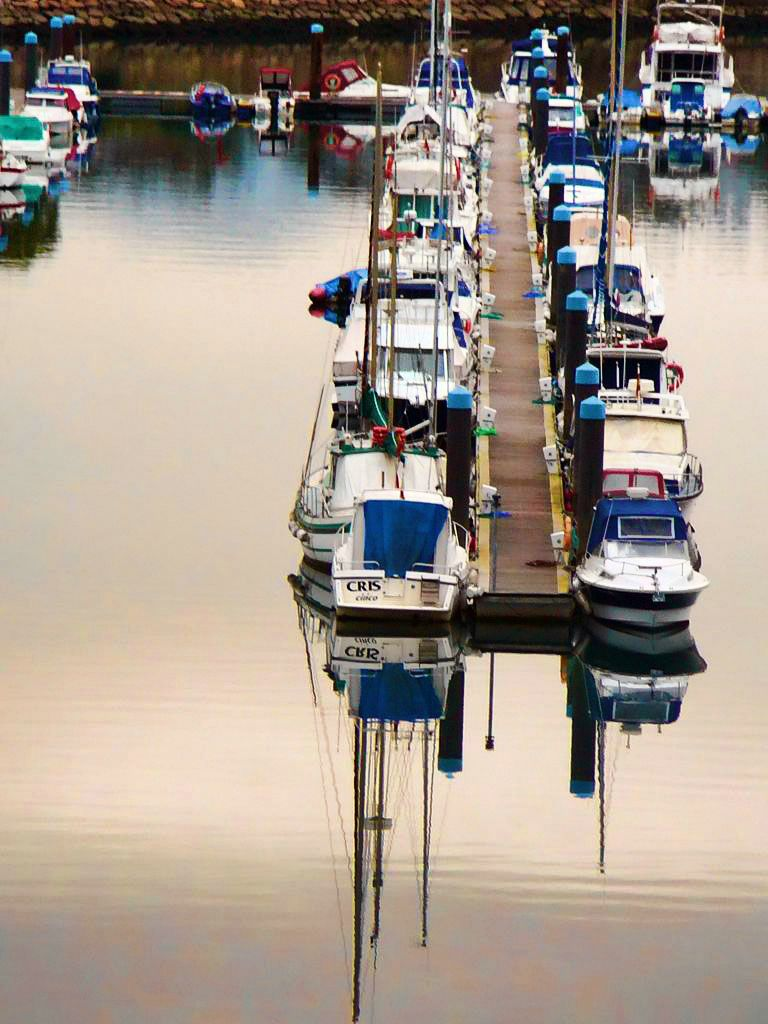
Berths

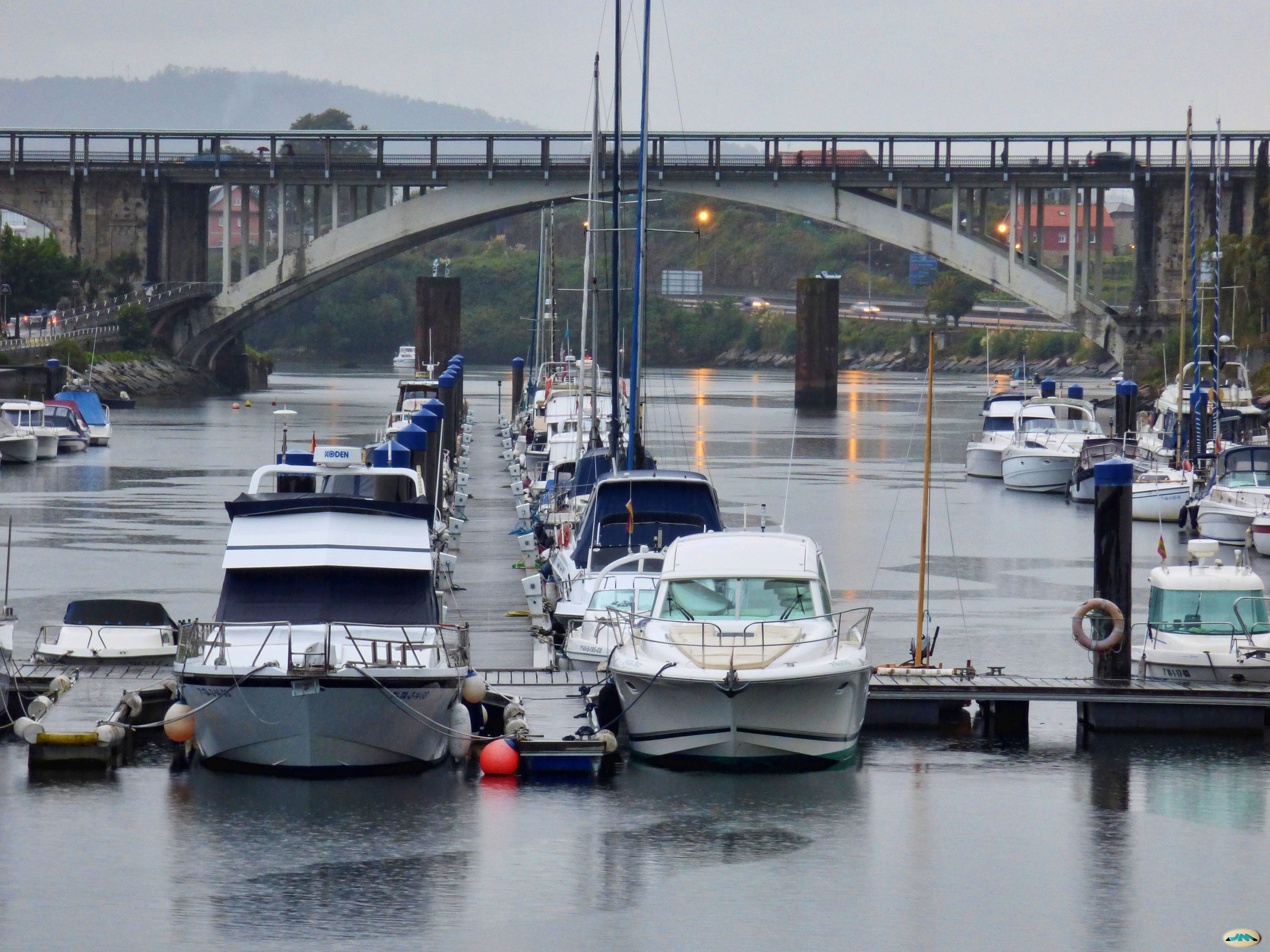
Boats and Barca bridge in the background

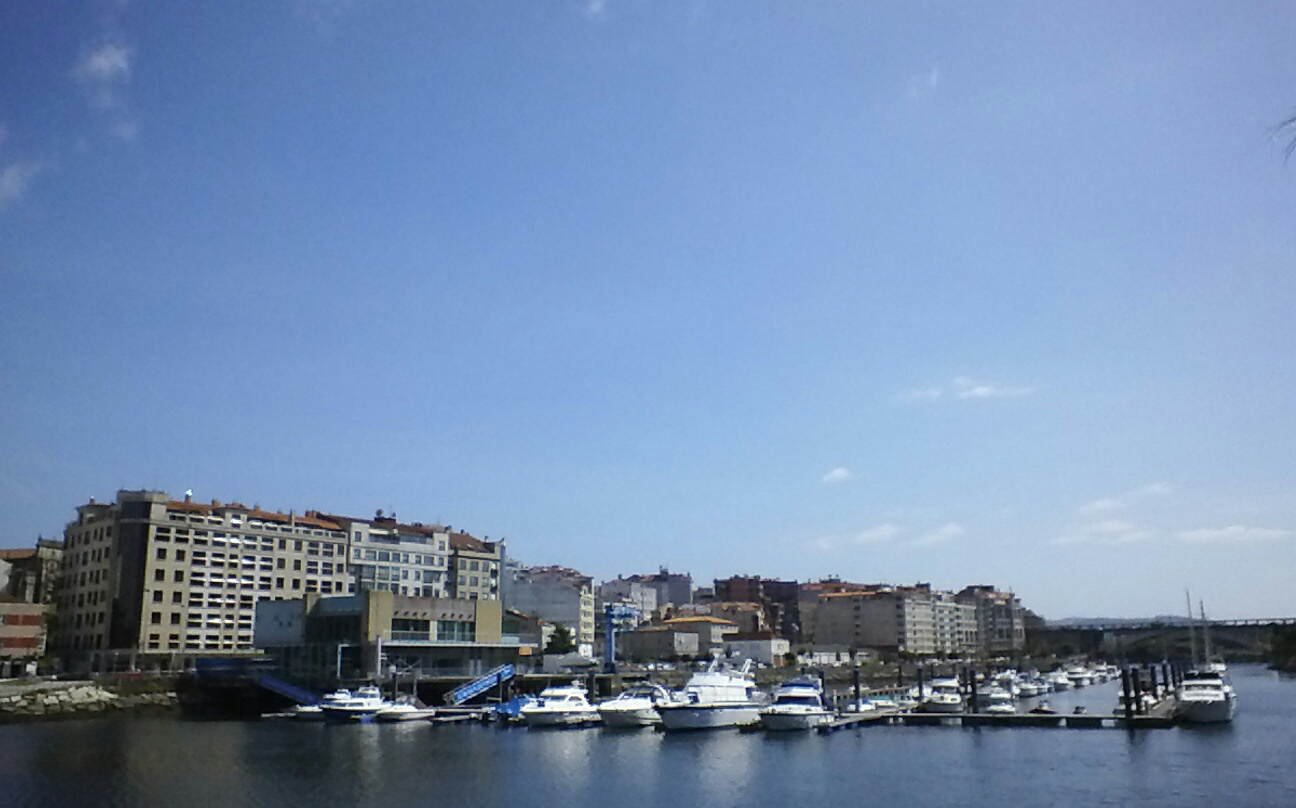
Marina

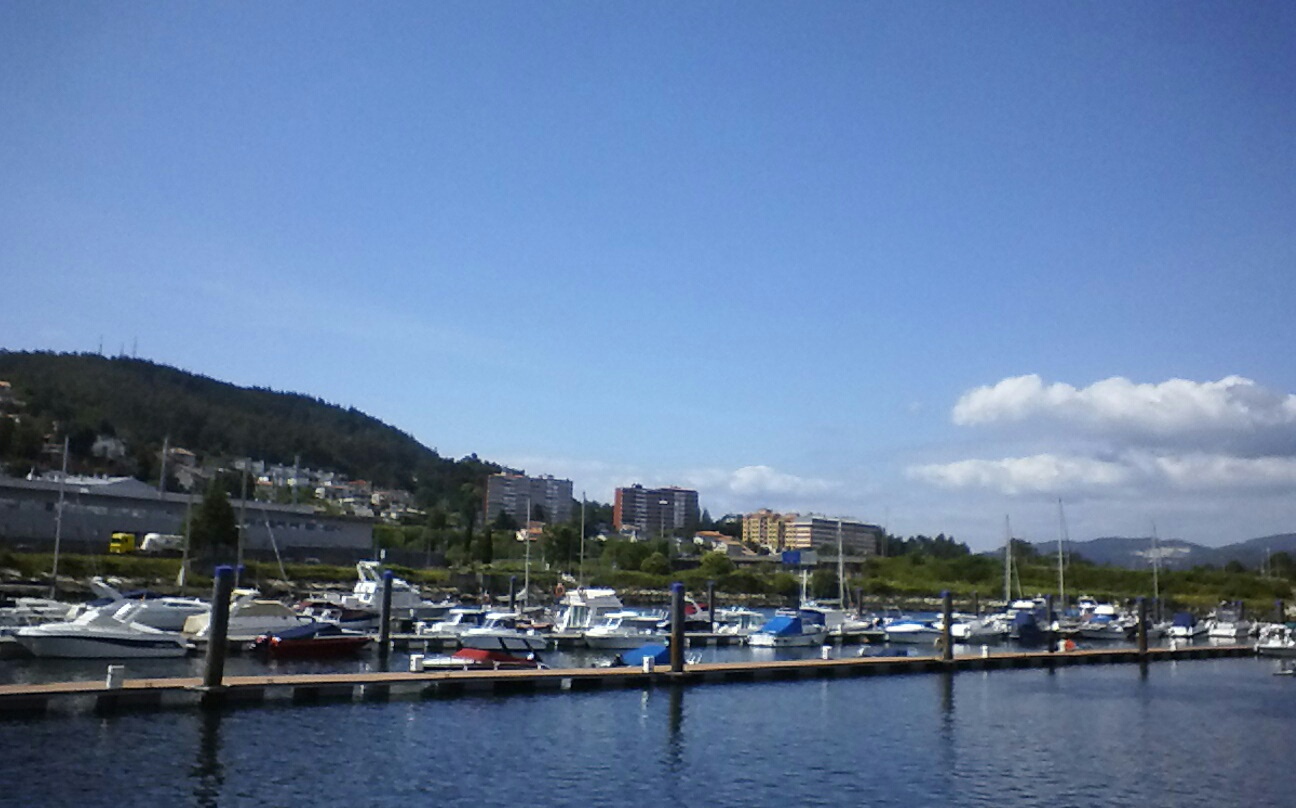
Marina and A Caeira in the background

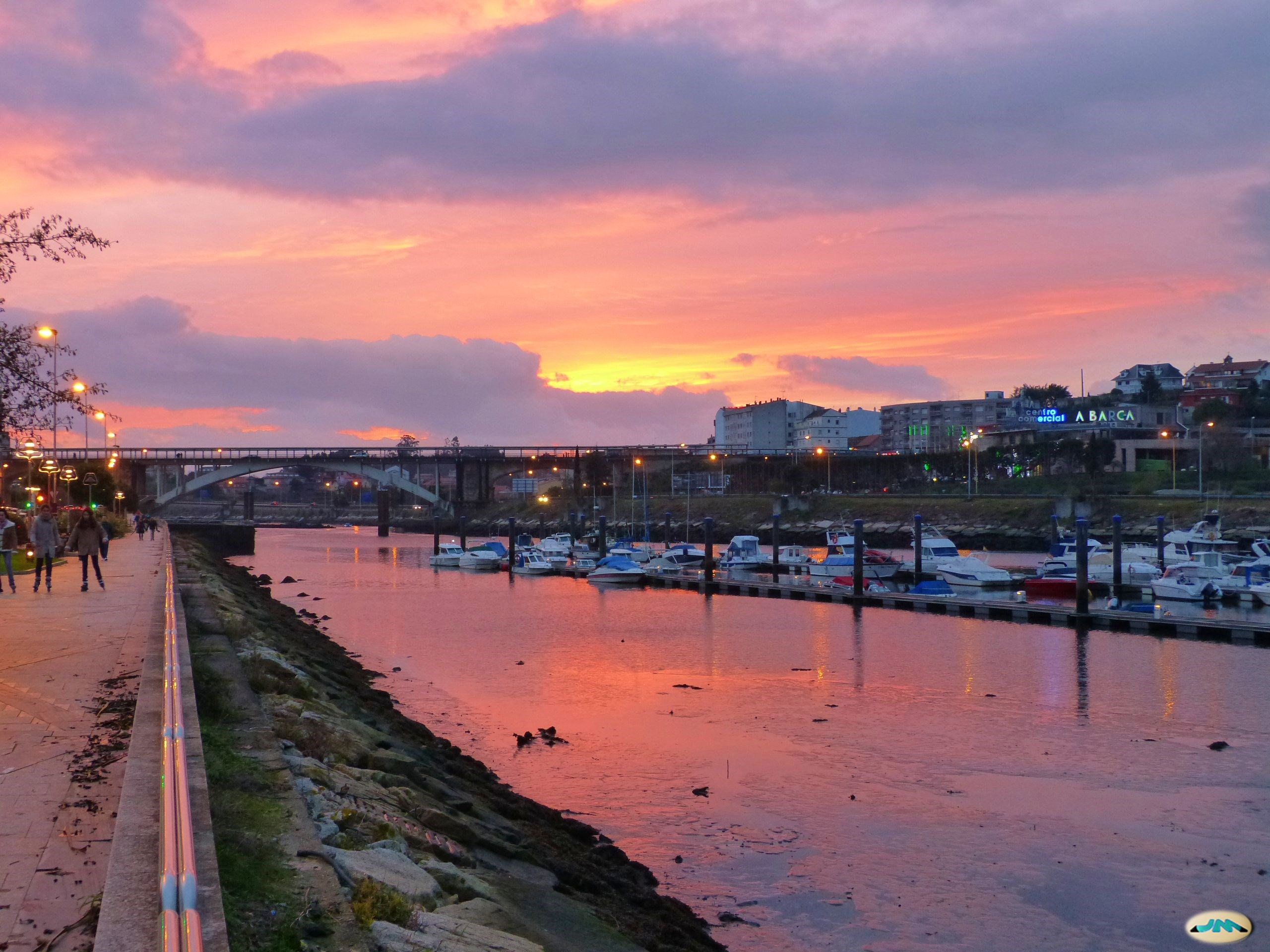
Marina at sunset

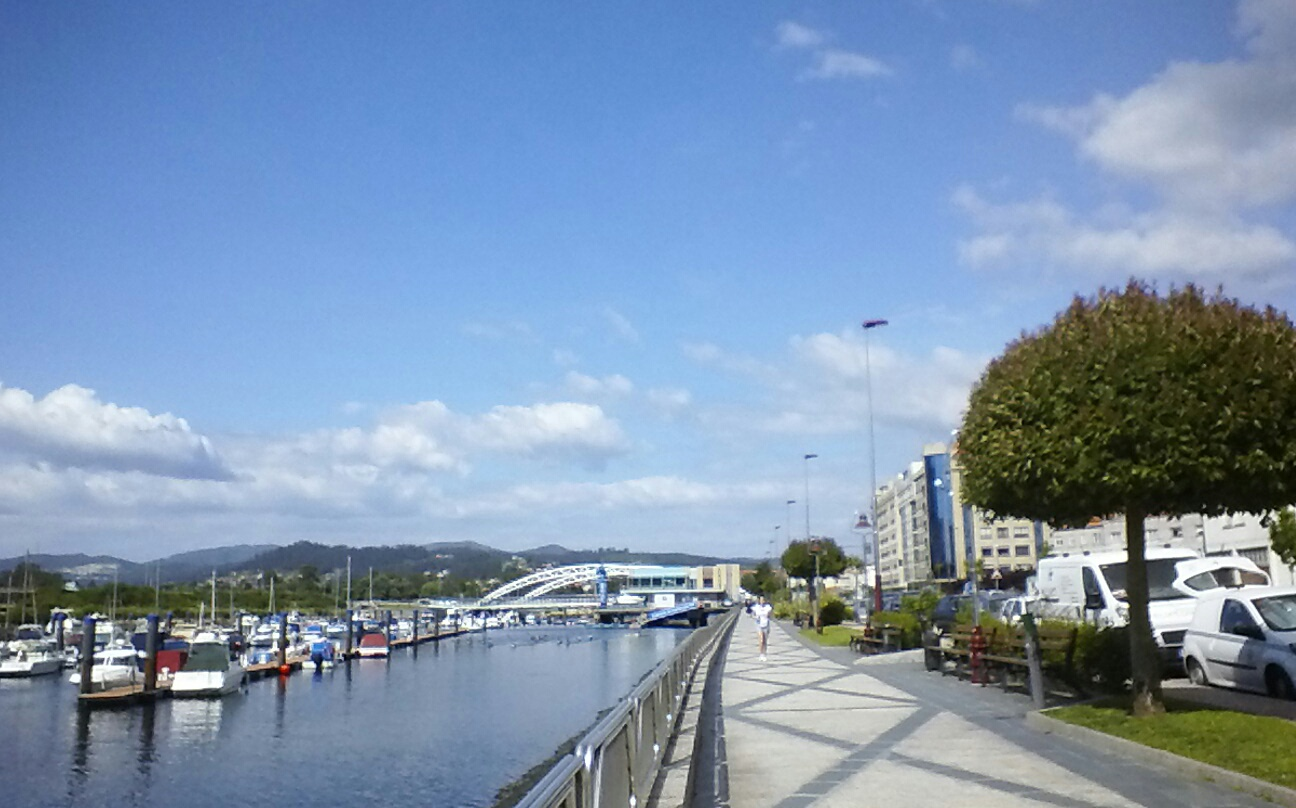
Seafront and marina

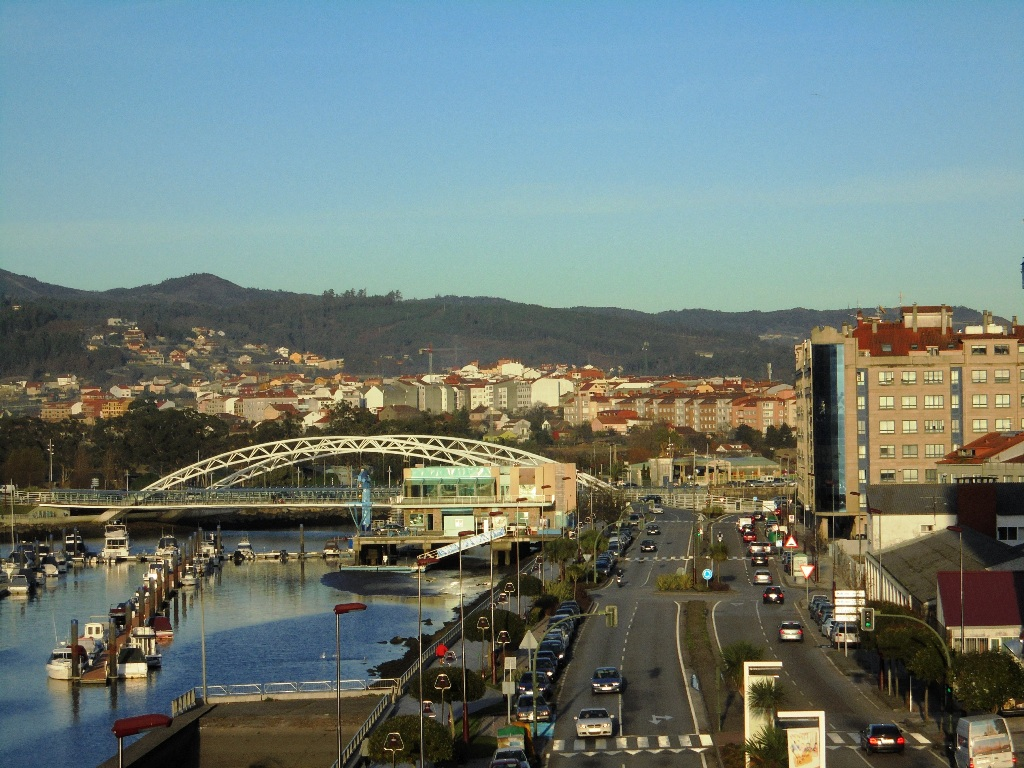
Uruguay or Orillamar avenue

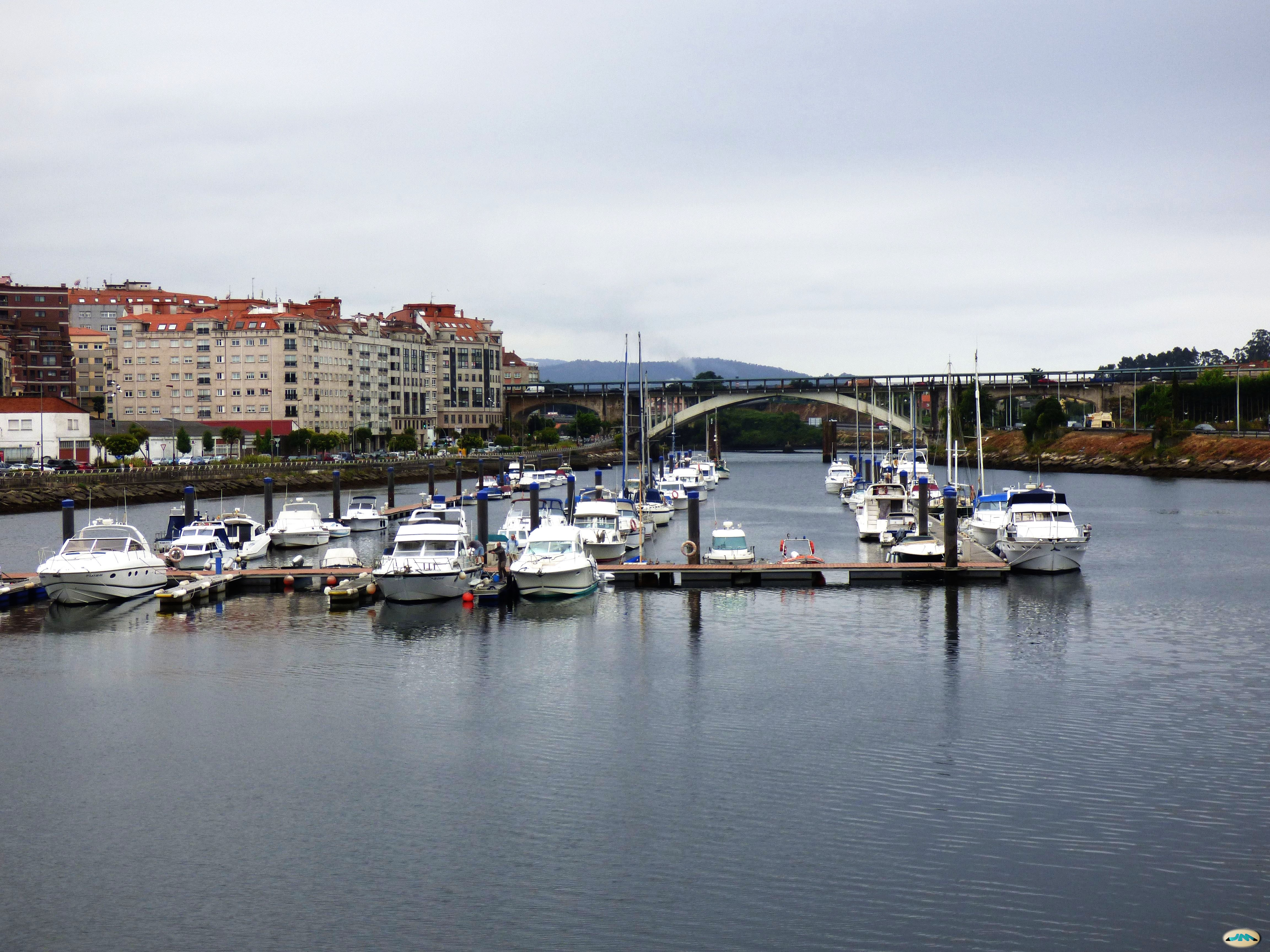
Marina

== See also ==
=== External links ===
- Club Náutico de Pontevedra
