= Puente Sampayo Bridge =

Stone arch bridge in Pontevedra, Spain

Puente Sampayo Bridge Puente de Puente Sampayo
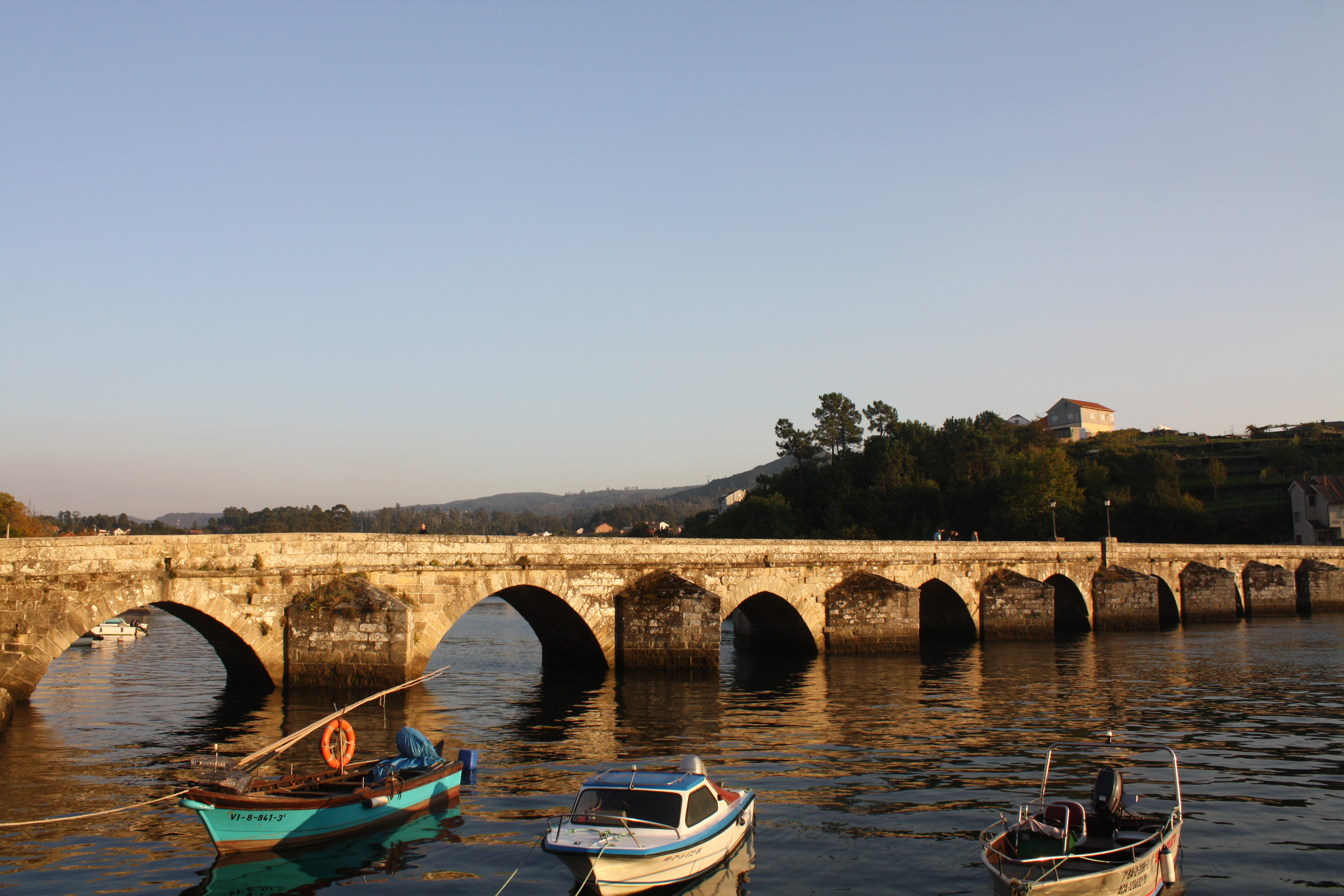
- Ponte Sampaio bridge in Pontevedra
- Coordinates: 42.345983°N 8.606833°W
- Carries: Pedestrians, cars
- Crosses: Verdugo River
- Locale: between Pontevedra and Soutomaior municipalities, Galicia, Spain

Characteristics
- Design: Arch
- Material: Stone
- Total length: 144 m (472 ft)
- Width: 10 m (33 ft)

History
- Construction start: 11th century
- Construction end: 18th century

The Puente Sampayo Bridge is a medieval bridge that crosses the Verdugo River between the civil parish of Ponte Sampaio in the municipality of Pontevedra and the civil parish of Arcade in the municipality of Soutomaior in Spain.

== History ==
The bridge is built on a Roman foundation. The first references to this bridge date back to the 10th and 11th centuries, when it was called "Ponti Sancti Pelagli de Lutto" (Bridge of San Paio de Lodo) and belonged to the Counts of Burgundy. The mythical fortress of San Paio de Lodo was located near this bridge, the place where the armies of Queen Urraca of León and Archbishop Gelmírez fought. In 997, Almanzor crossed it, destroying the fortress that defended it. Anyone wishing to cross the river by the bridge had to pay a toll, but thanks to the archbishop of Santiago de Compostela, Diego Gelmírez, this practice ended in the 12th century.

The bridge witnessed the Battle of Puente Sampayo against the French invasion, which took place on 7 and 8 June 1809 under intense gunfire on both banks of the Verdugo River and in which the French were defeated.

== Description ==
It is a stone bridge 144 metres long and ten metres wide. It has ten pointed arches with large starlings between them. It has a stone parapet and was extensively modified and rebuilt in the 16th and 18th centuries.

The bridge is part of the PO-264 road and belongs to the road network of the Xunta de Galicia. The Portuguese Way to Santiago de Compostela crosses the bridge.

== Culture ==
In Pontevedra's Plaza de España stands the monument to the heroes of Puente Sampayo. The central granite part symbolises one of the pillars of the Puente Sampayo bridge, where most of the 1809 battle took place.

== Gallery ==
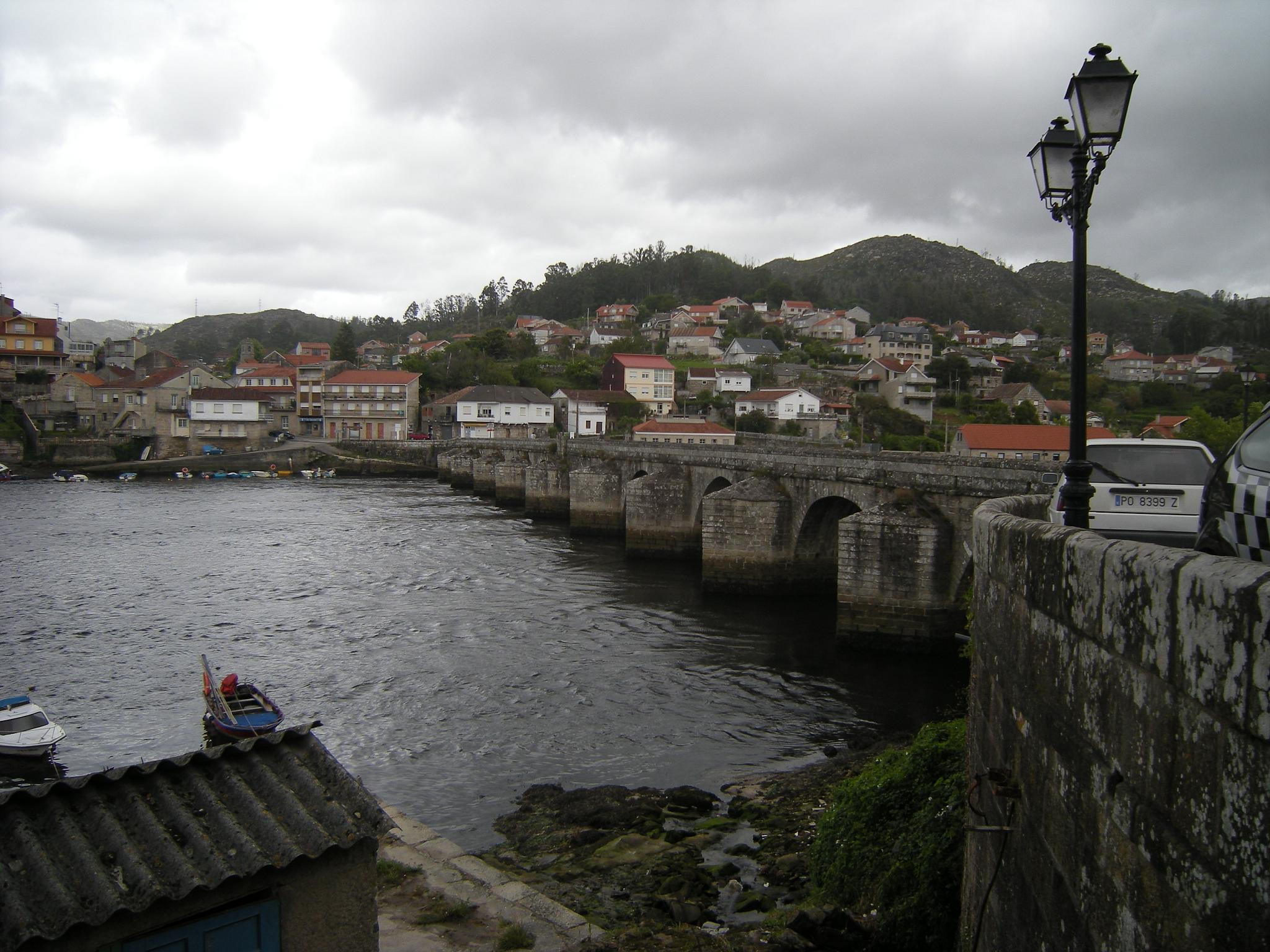

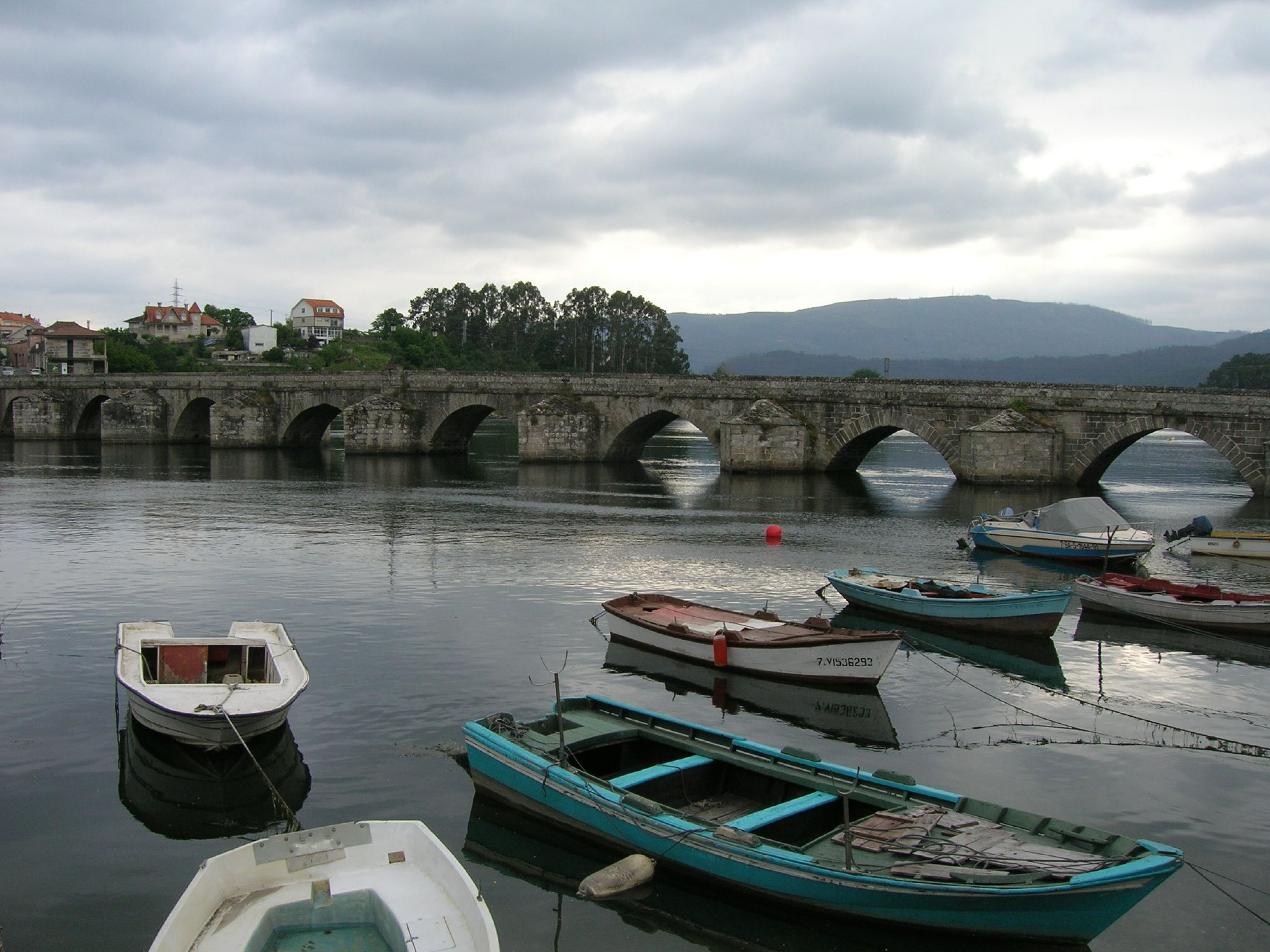

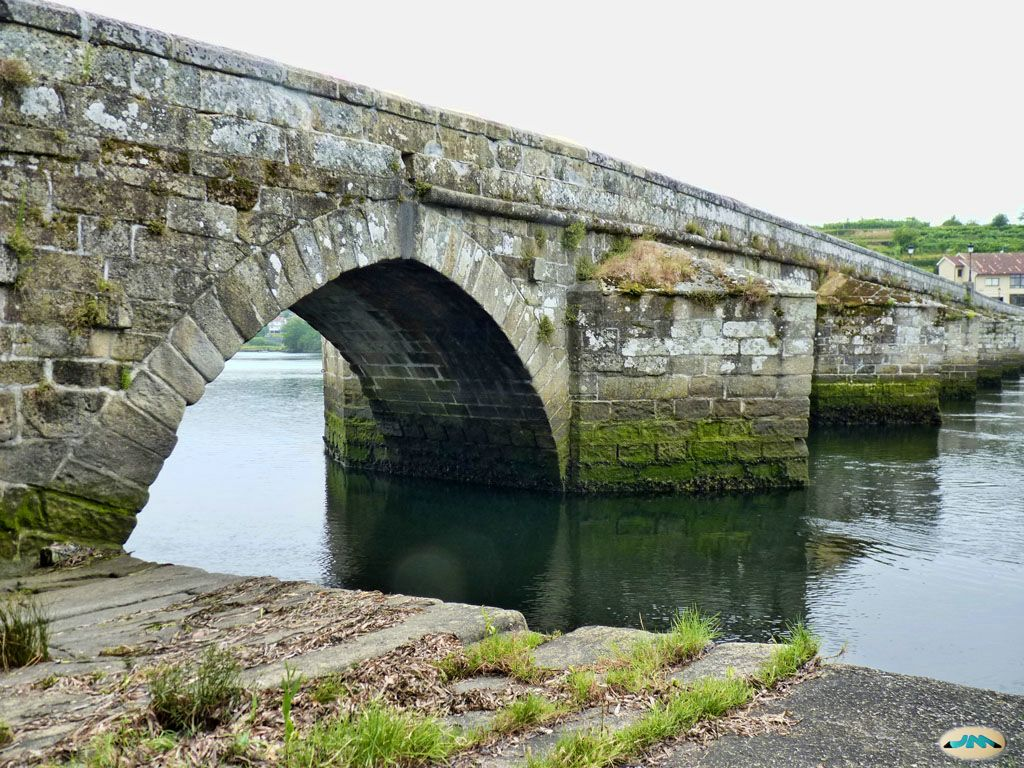

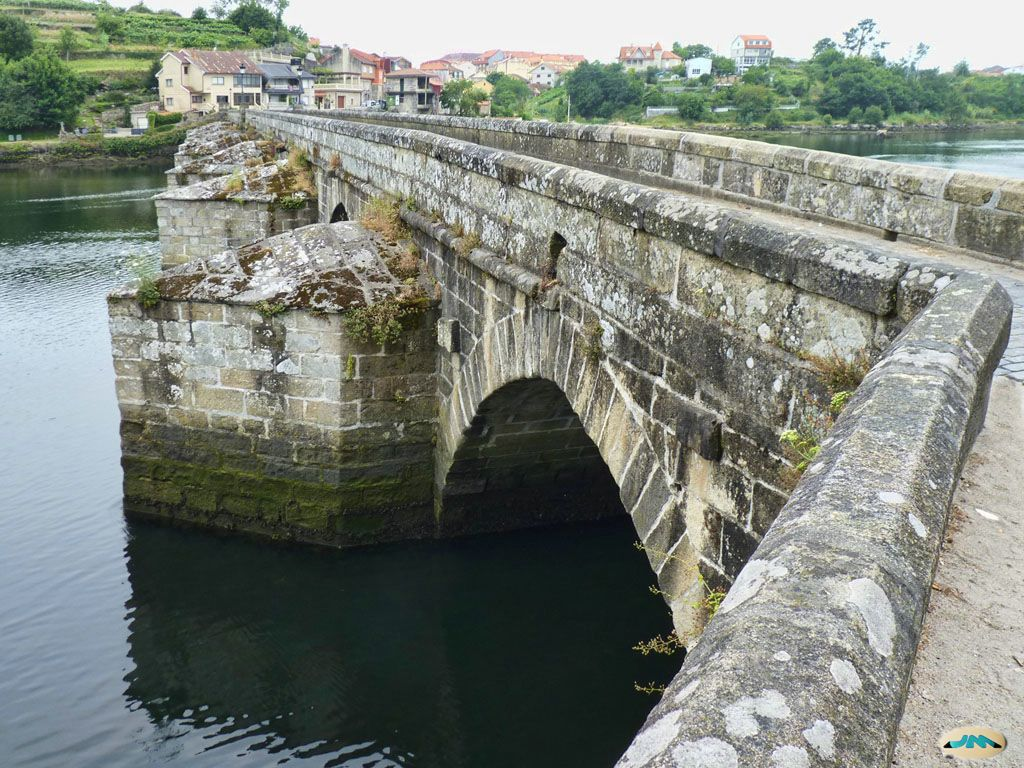

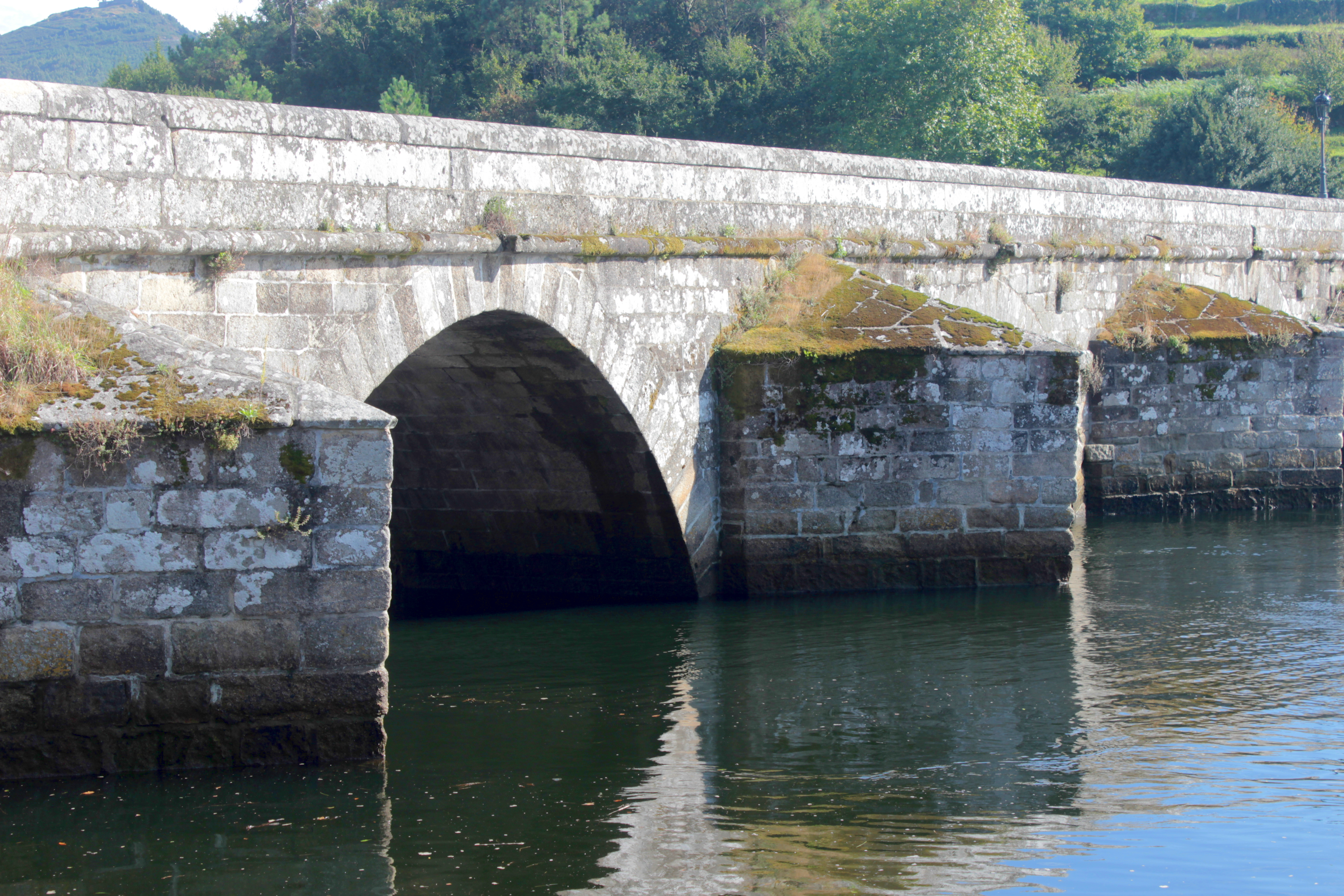

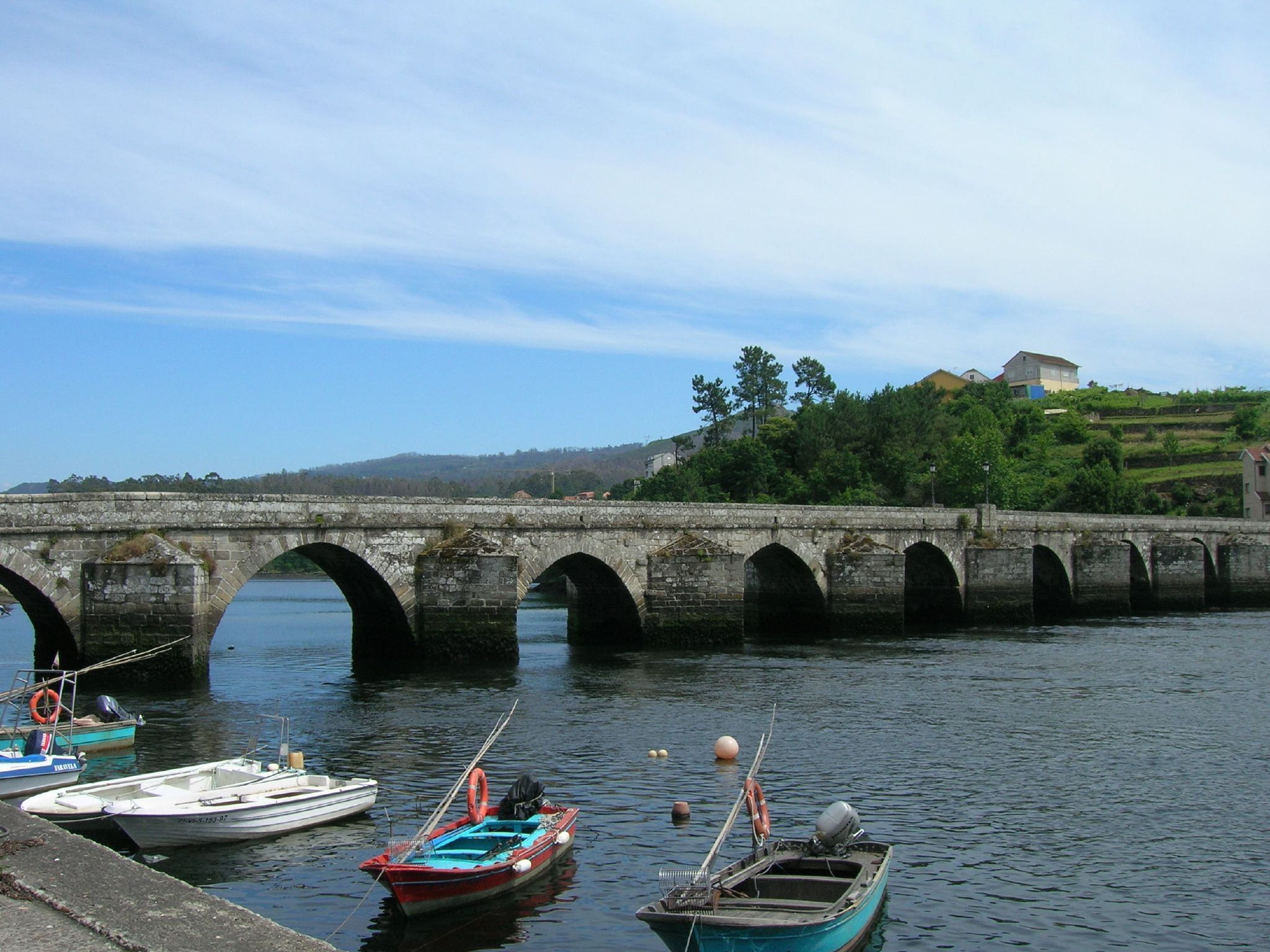

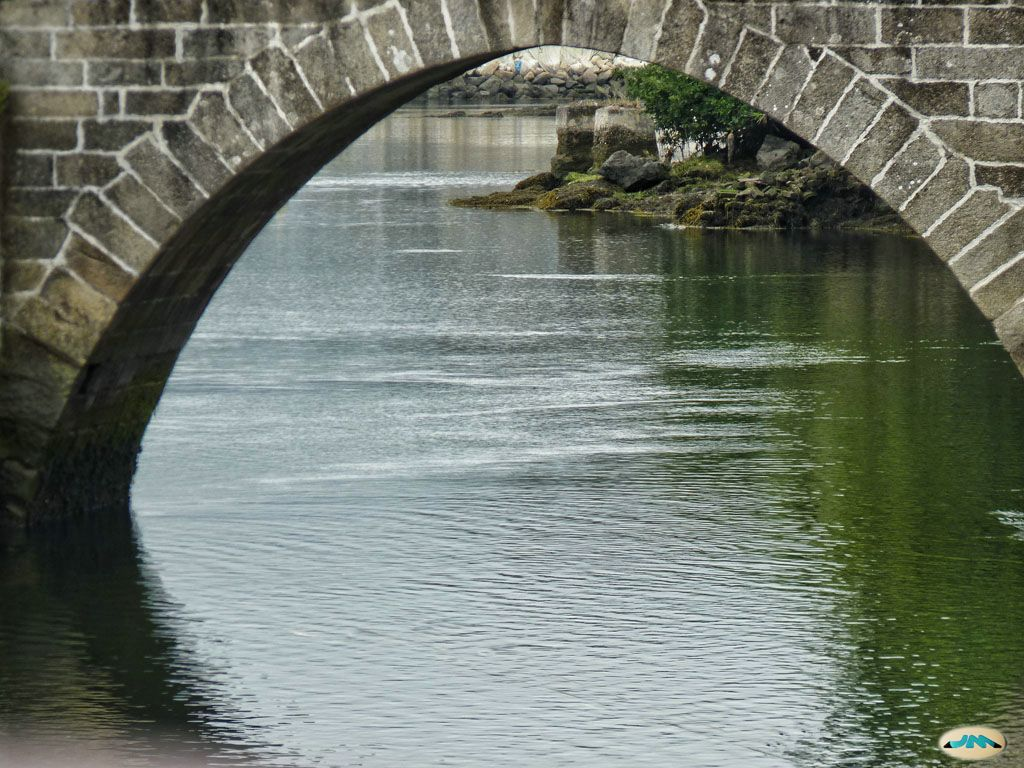

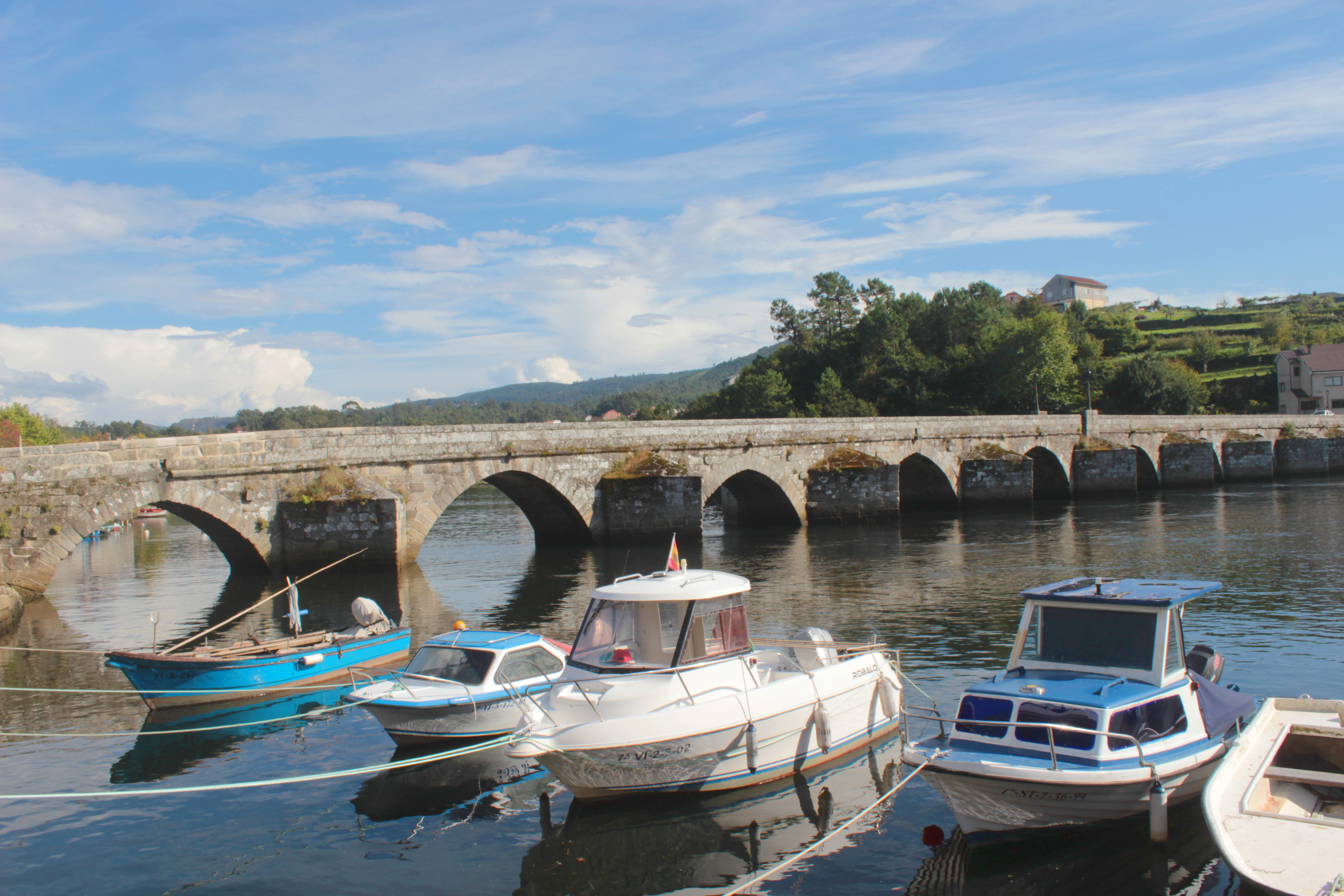

== See also ==
=== Bibliography ===
- Riveiro Tobío, Elvira (2008). Descubrir Pontevedra (in Spanish). Pontevedra: Edicións do Cumio. p. 88-89. ISBN 978-8482890852.

=== Related articles ===
- Burgo Bridge
- Santiago Bridge
- Barca Bridge
- Tirantes Bridge
- Currents Bridge

=== External links ===
- The medieval bridge of Puente Sampayo on the website Turismo de Galicia
- The bridge on the website Turismo Rías Baixas
