= Santiago Bridge =

Beam bridge in Pontevedra, Spain

Santiago Bridge Puente de Santiago
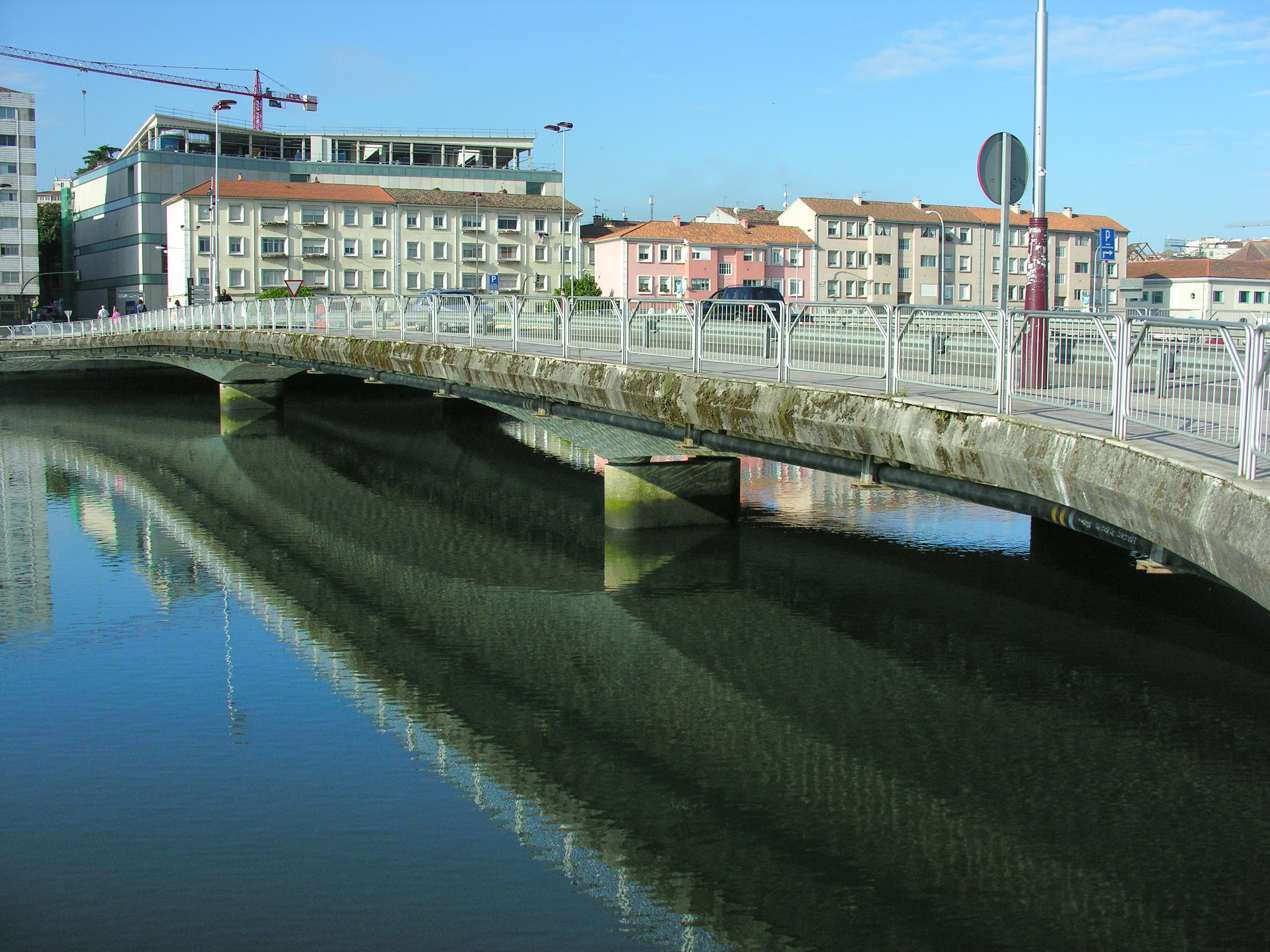
- Santiago bridge
- Coordinates: 42.434722°N 8.641667°W
- Carries: Motor vehicles and pedestrians
- Crosses: Lérez River
- Locale: Pontevedra, Spain

Characteristics
- Design: Girder
- Material: Reinforced concrete
- Total length: 99 m (325 ft)
- Width: 17 m (56 ft)
- Longest span: 48 m (157 ft)

History
- Construction start: 1981
- Construction end: 1983
- Opened: 11 September 1983

The Santiago Bridge (St. James Bridge) crosses the Lérez River in the city of Pontevedra (Spain), where the N-550 road runs alongside it. It connects the city centre with the A Xunqueira area and the O Burgo district.

== History ==
The project for this bridge, designed to relieve congestion on the Burgo Bridge over which the N-550 used to run, was presented in 1980. Construction began in June 1981 and was carried out by the Spanish Government's Ministry of Public Works at a cost of 173 million pesetas.

Inaugurated on 11 September 1983 by the former Minister of Public Works Jesús Sancho Rof, it was not fully operational until the redevelopment of Buenos Aires Avenue and the inauguration of Compostela Avenue on 3 July 1987, which, with four lanes, gave continuity to the Santiago Bridge and offered a new exit to the city from the north towards Santiago de Compostela and A Coruña.

== Description ==
It is a reinforced concrete girder bridge with two decks supported on four pillars. Each of the two decks has three bays. The span of the central bay is 48 metres and that of the side bays is 25 metres.

The bridge is 99 metres long and 17 metres wide. It has four lanes for vehicles, guard rails and two pavements. The bridge ends on the north bank with a wide passage for pedestrians and cyclists. It connects Padre Amoedo Carballo Street to Compostela Avenue.

In its early years of service, it was simply called Tercer Puente (third bridge) until the opening of Compostela Avenue to traffic. As it was the natural exit from the city to Santiago de Compostela, it was renamed Santiago Bridge.

== Gallery ==
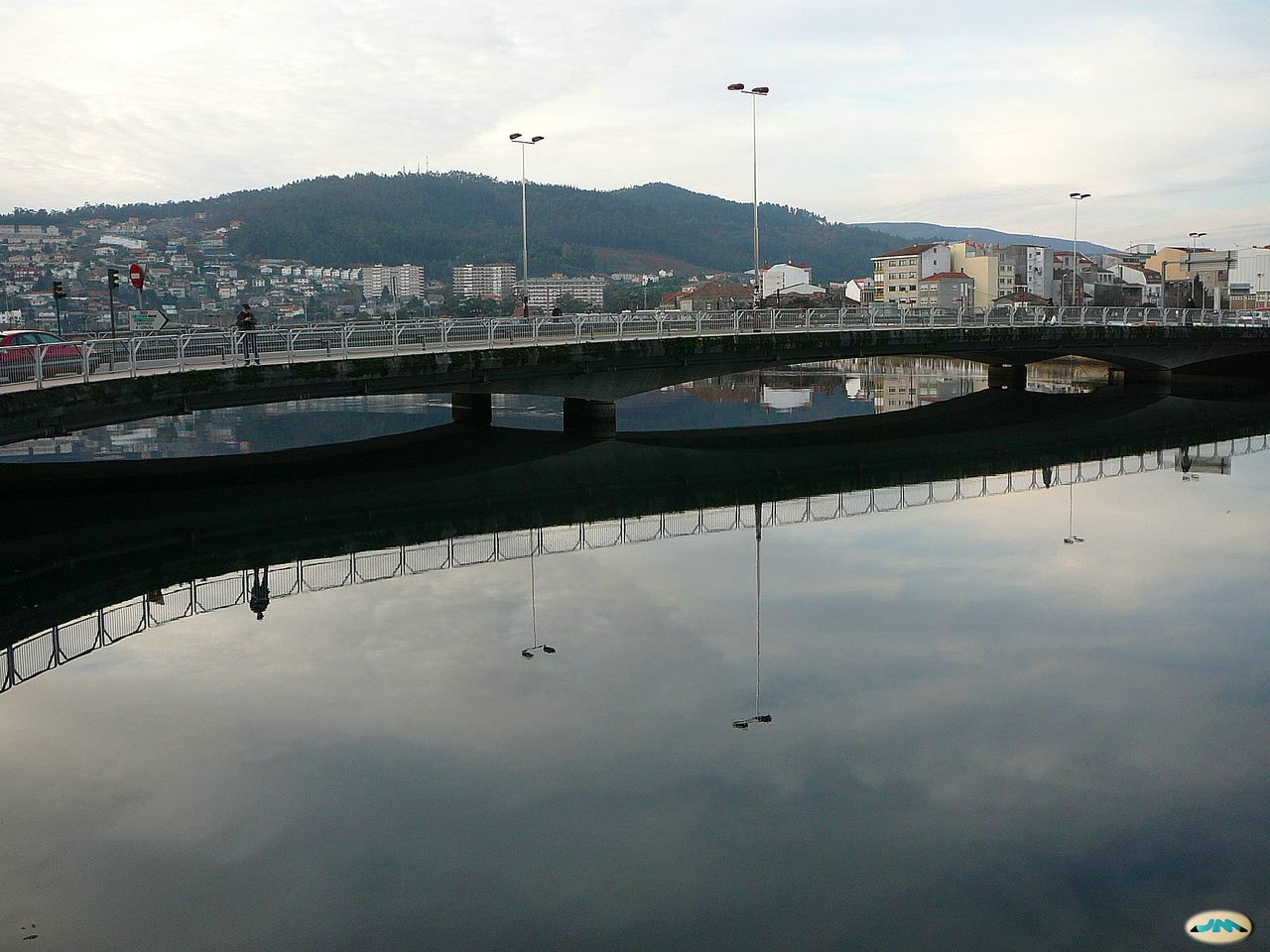
Santiago Bridge with O Burgo and A Caeira in the background.

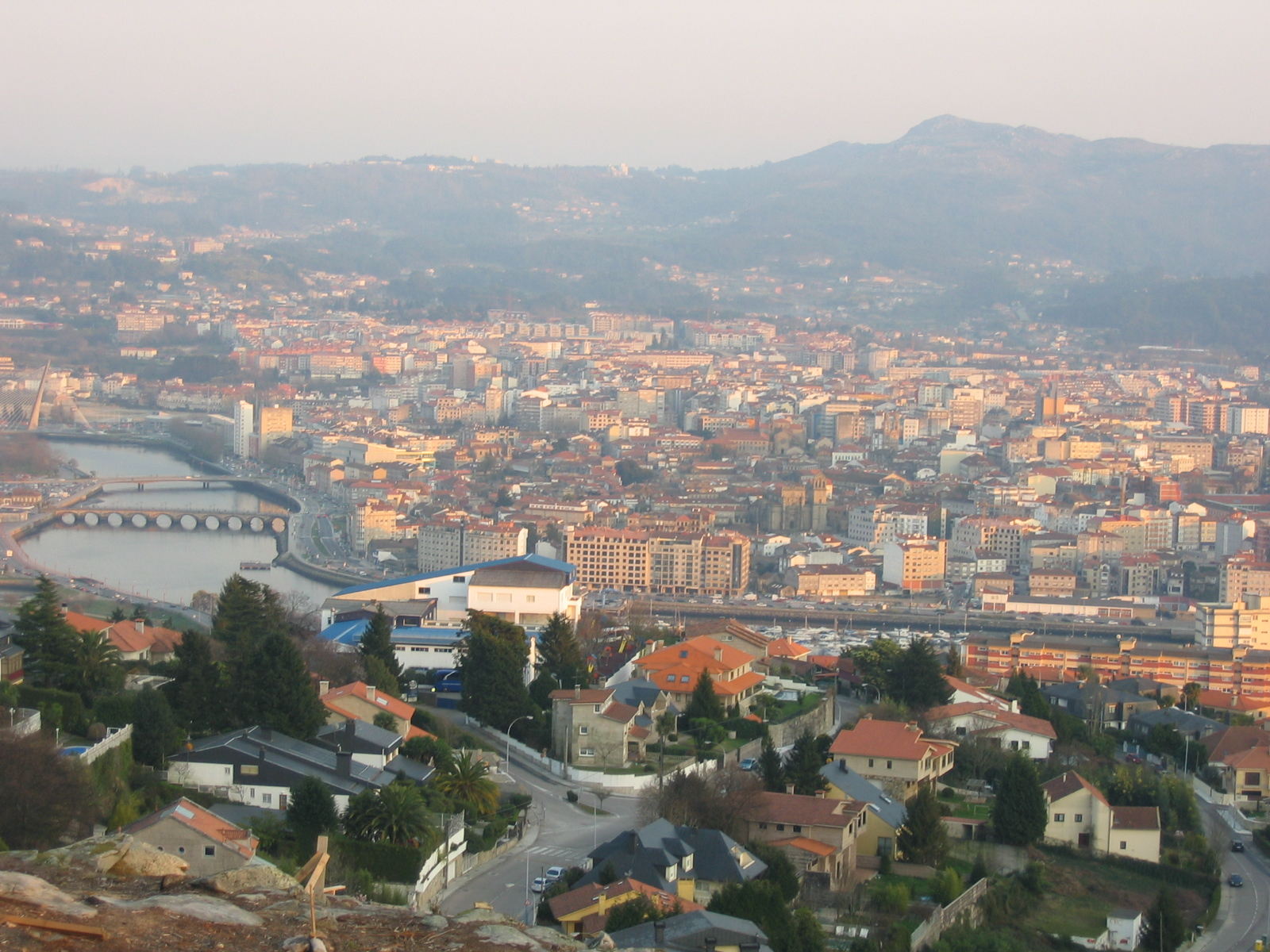
On the left, from top to bottom, the Tirantes, Santiago and Burgo bridges.

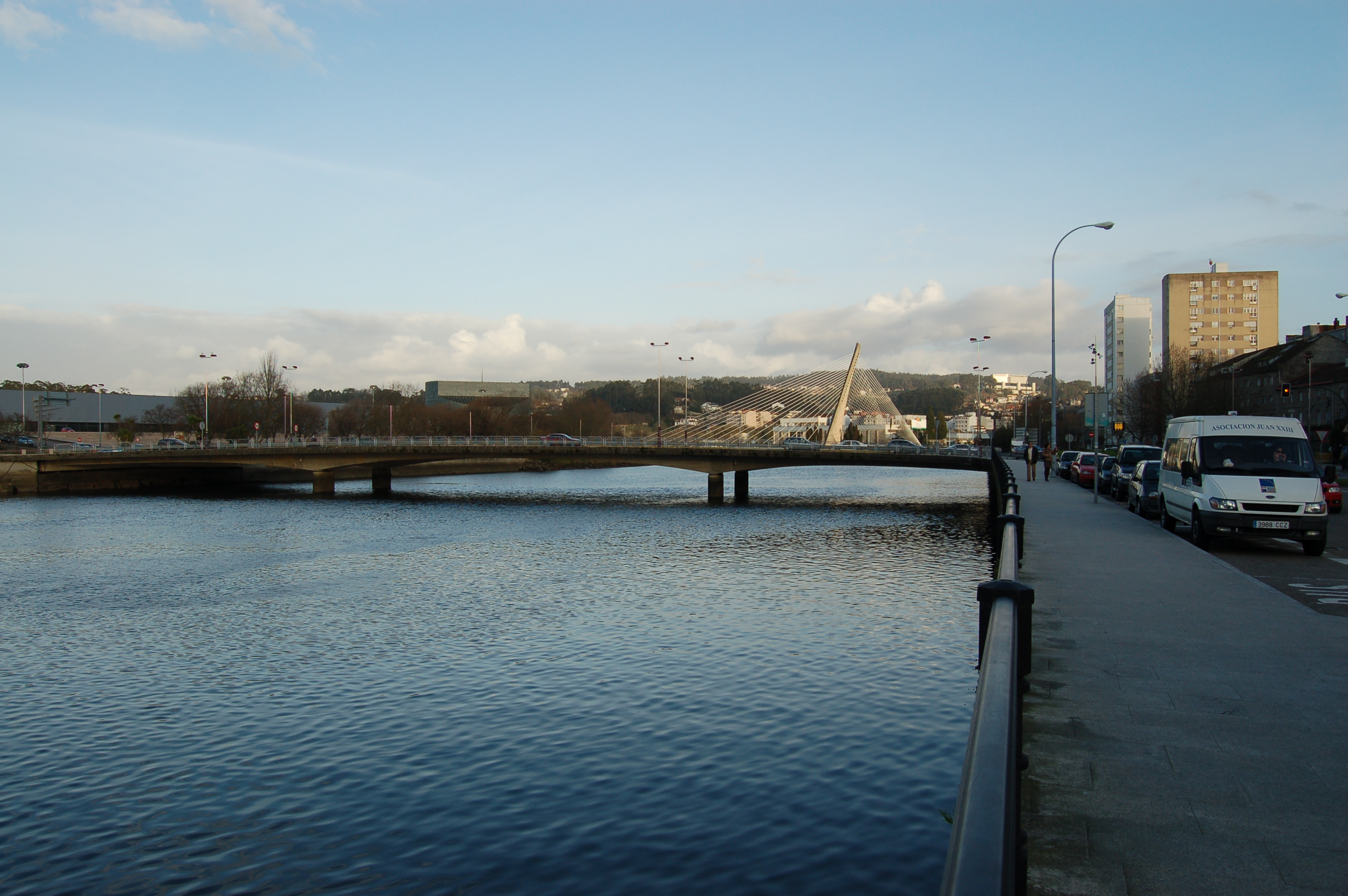
In the foreground the Santiago Bridge, behind the Tirantes Bridge.

== See also ==
=== Related articles ===
- Currents Bridge
- Barca Bridge
- Burgo Bridge
- Tirantes Bridge
- Puente Sampayo Bridge

=== External links ===
- Structurae: Santiago Bridge
