= Tirantes Bridge =

Cable-stayed bridge in Pontevedra, Spain

Tirantes Bridge Puente de los Tirantes
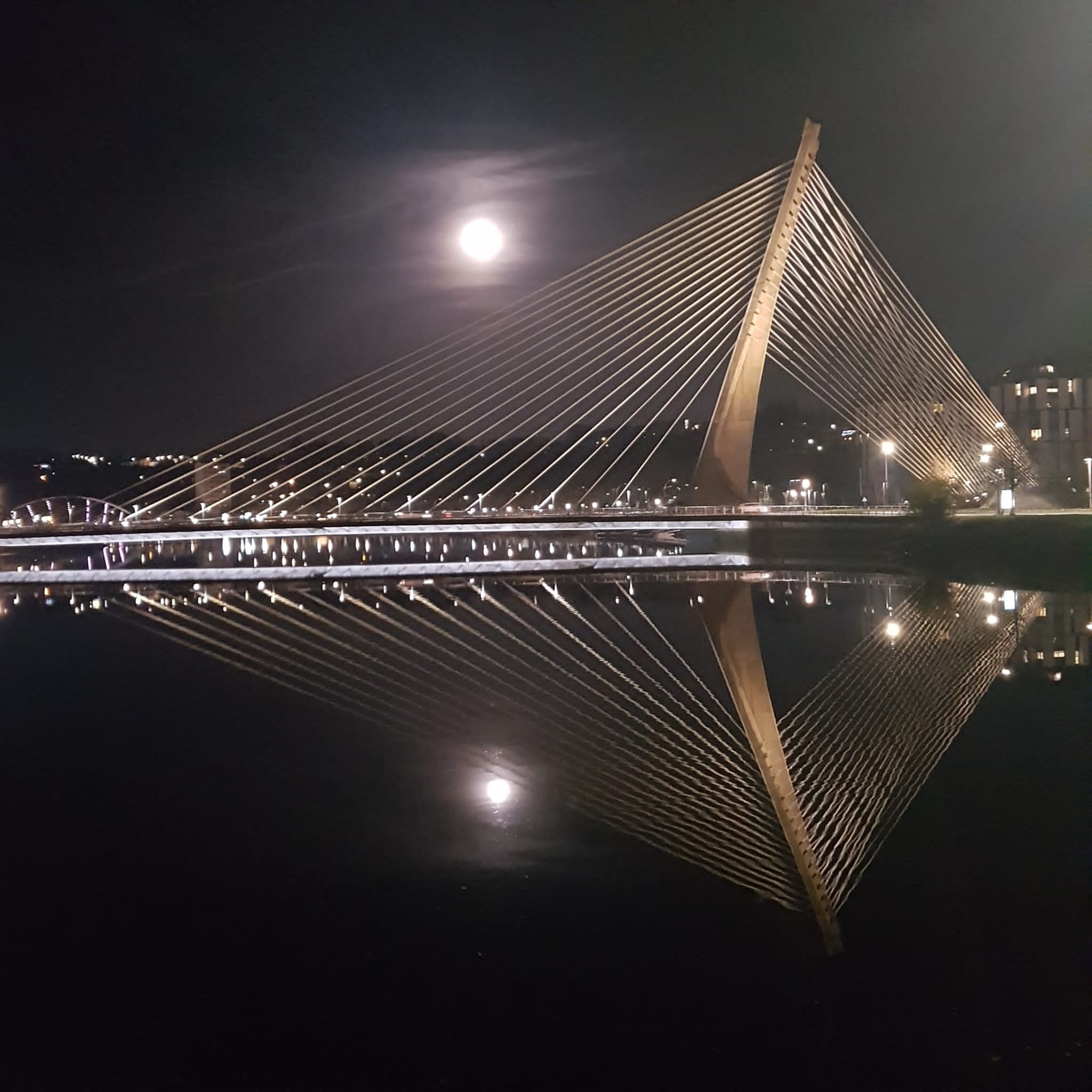
- Tirantes bridge at night in 2022
- Coordinates: 42.434371°N 8.636521°W
- Carries: Motor vehicles, bicycles, and pedestrians
- Crosses: River Lérez
- Locale: Pontevedra, Spain

Characteristics
- Design: Cable-stayed
- Material: Steel and reinforced concrete
- Total length: 125 m (410 ft)
- Width: 20 m (66 ft)
- Height: 63 m (207 ft) (pylon)

History
- Construction start: 1993
- Construction end: 1995
- Opened: 26 May 1995

The Tirantes Bridge is a cantilever spar cable-stayed bridge that crosses the Lérez River in the city of Pontevedra, Spain, linking the south bank to the north bank at the level of the city's Congress Hall.

Designed by Leonardo Fernandez Troyano and Francisco Javier Manterola Armisen in 1992, it was inaugurated in 1995. It is one of the 33 most outstanding bridges in Spain.

== History ==
The construction of the bridge was planned by the Xunta de Galicia to connect the two banks of the Lérez River at the beginning of the 1990s as part of a large urban planning project for the development of the north-eastern area of the city, on the drained land of a former Marshland.

The project included the construction of the Pontevedra Congress Hall and a cable-stayed bridge to serve it as a northbound exit from the city. The jury of the preliminary design competition for the bridge, chaired by the Regional Minister of Public Works, José Cuíña, announced its decision on 15 December 1991.

Construction of the bridge began in April 1993. The construction was conditioned by the tides of the Pontevedra bay with sea level variations of more than 4 metres. This forced a construction process independent of the water and the bridge had to be built by successive overhangs.

On 13 May 1995, the structure was subjected to a load test, with a total of 480,000 kg distributed over 16 trucks which caused a maximum deformation of 19.3 cm on the lower deck. Once this load test was successfully completed, the bridge was opened to traffic on 26 May 1995 and from then on it became one of the symbols of the modernity of the city.

== Design ==
The bridge has a total length between pillars of 125 metres without intermediate supports and has a 63-metre high leaning reinforced concrete pylon from which 17 pairs of stays emerge, those at the front holding the concrete box girder deck, and those at the rear supported by two concrete bases on the ground, serving as a counterweight to balance the tower's forces. The width of the bridge deck is 20 metres.

The bridge deck is cable-stayed on the axis by means of two twin cable planes, which are anchored in the centre of the section every 6 metres with a separation of 0.70 metres between them. The tower serves as an anchor for the front stays supporting the bridge deck and the compensating stays.

The way the bridge is perceived is shaped by the weather conditions. Variations in light, or the intensity of the wind, change the perception of the bridge when the wind swings its stays and produces a characteristic noise.

It used to have 4 traffic lanes, but in 2013, one of these lanes was removed to integrate a bicycle path.

The steel stays are reflected in the water and when there is wind they make a very special and spectacular noise.

== Gallery ==
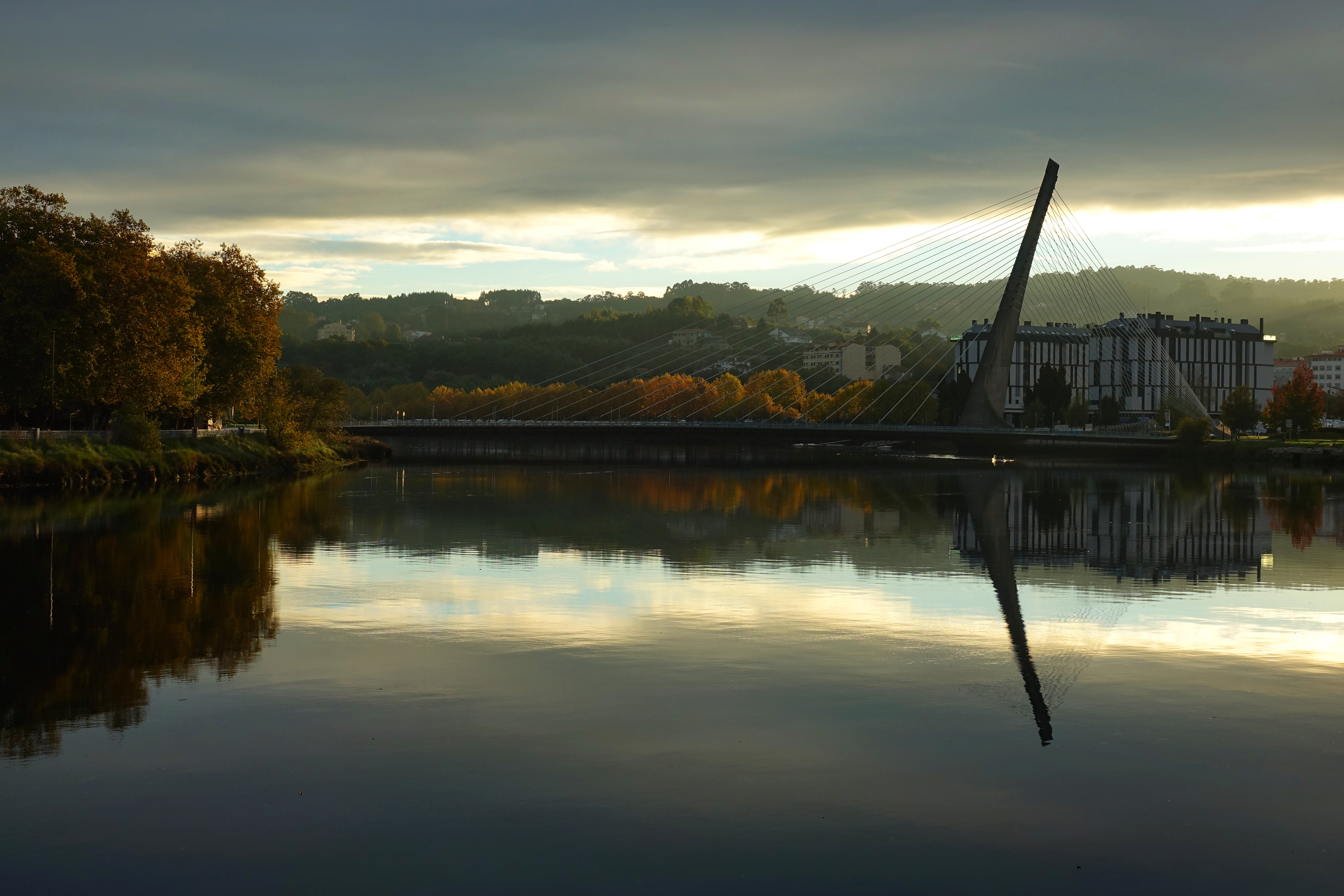
Tirantes bridge seen from west

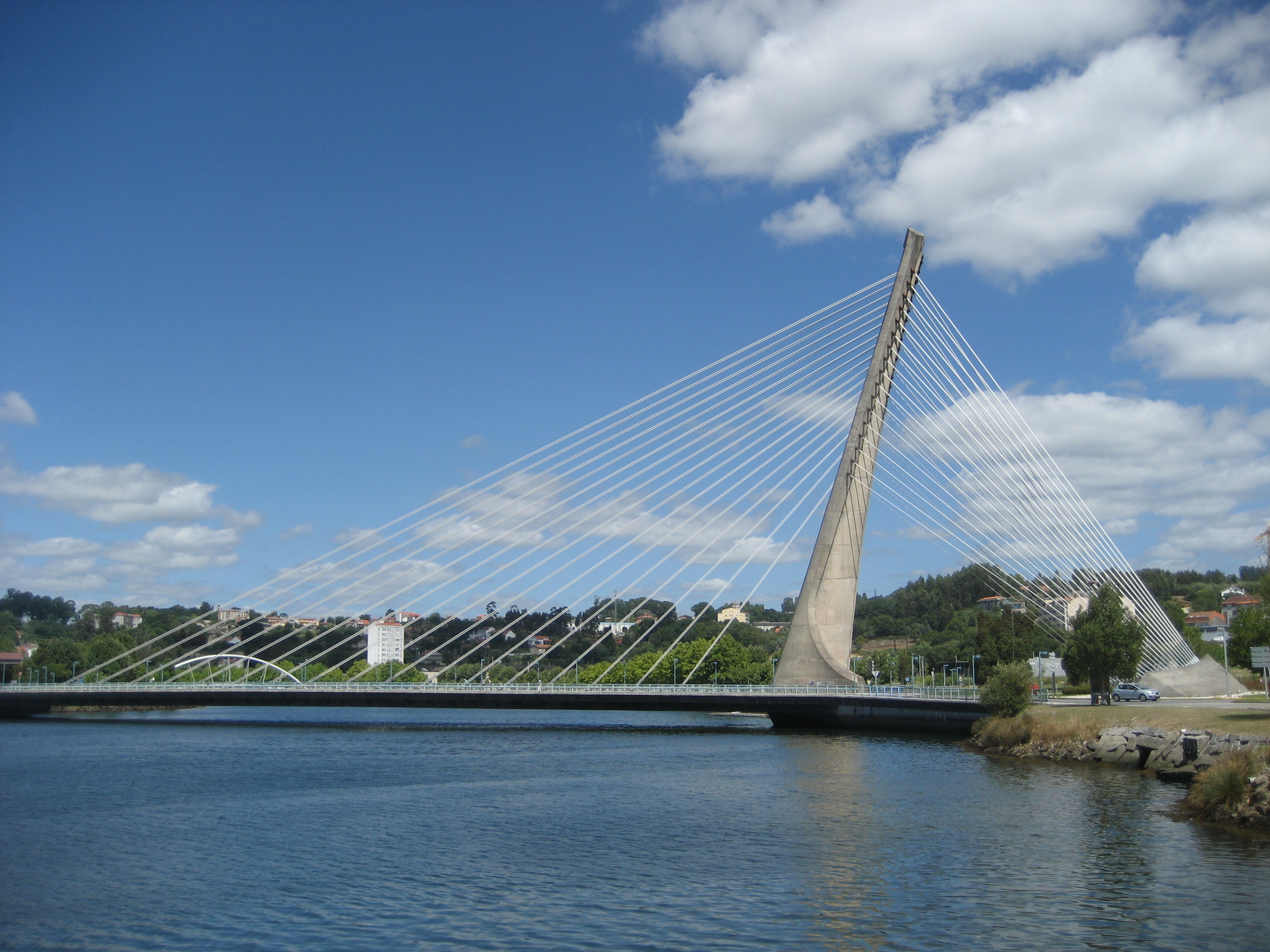
Tirantes Bridge

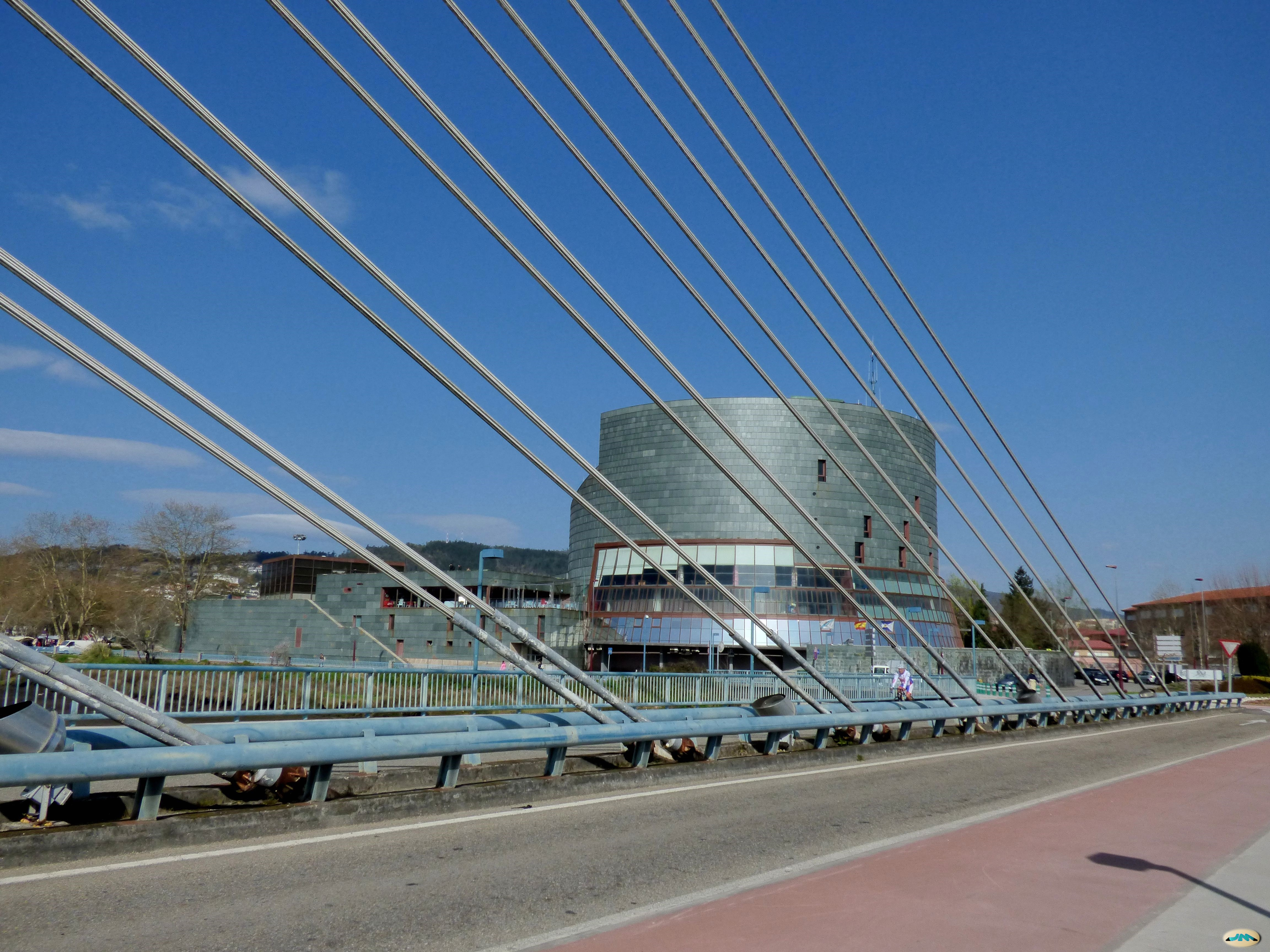
Tirantes Bridge and Congress Hall

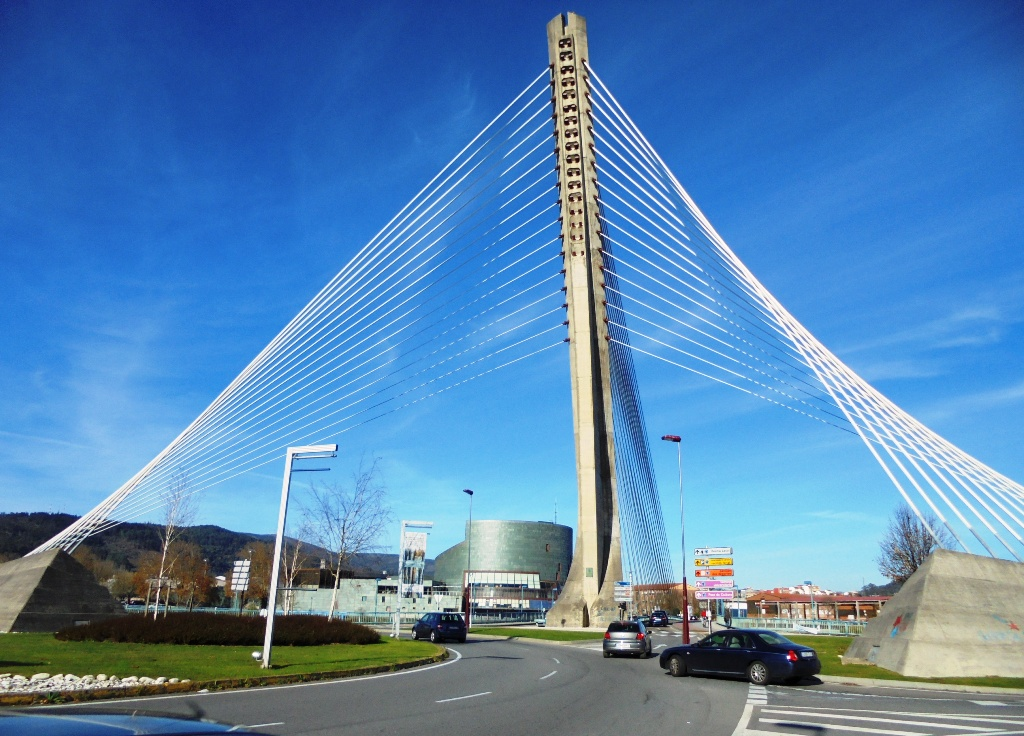
Tower and floor bases in reinforced concrete

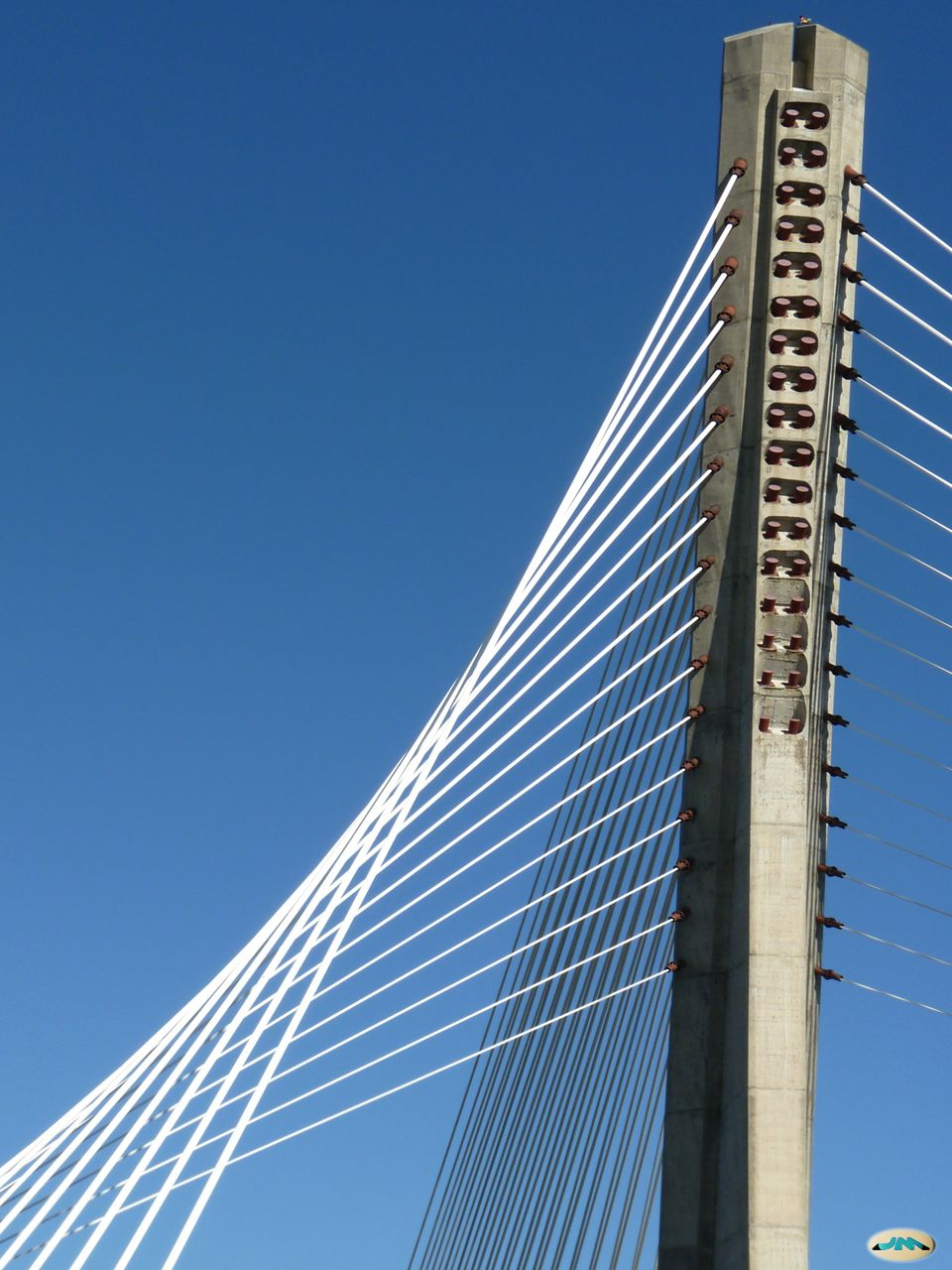
Pylon and stay cables

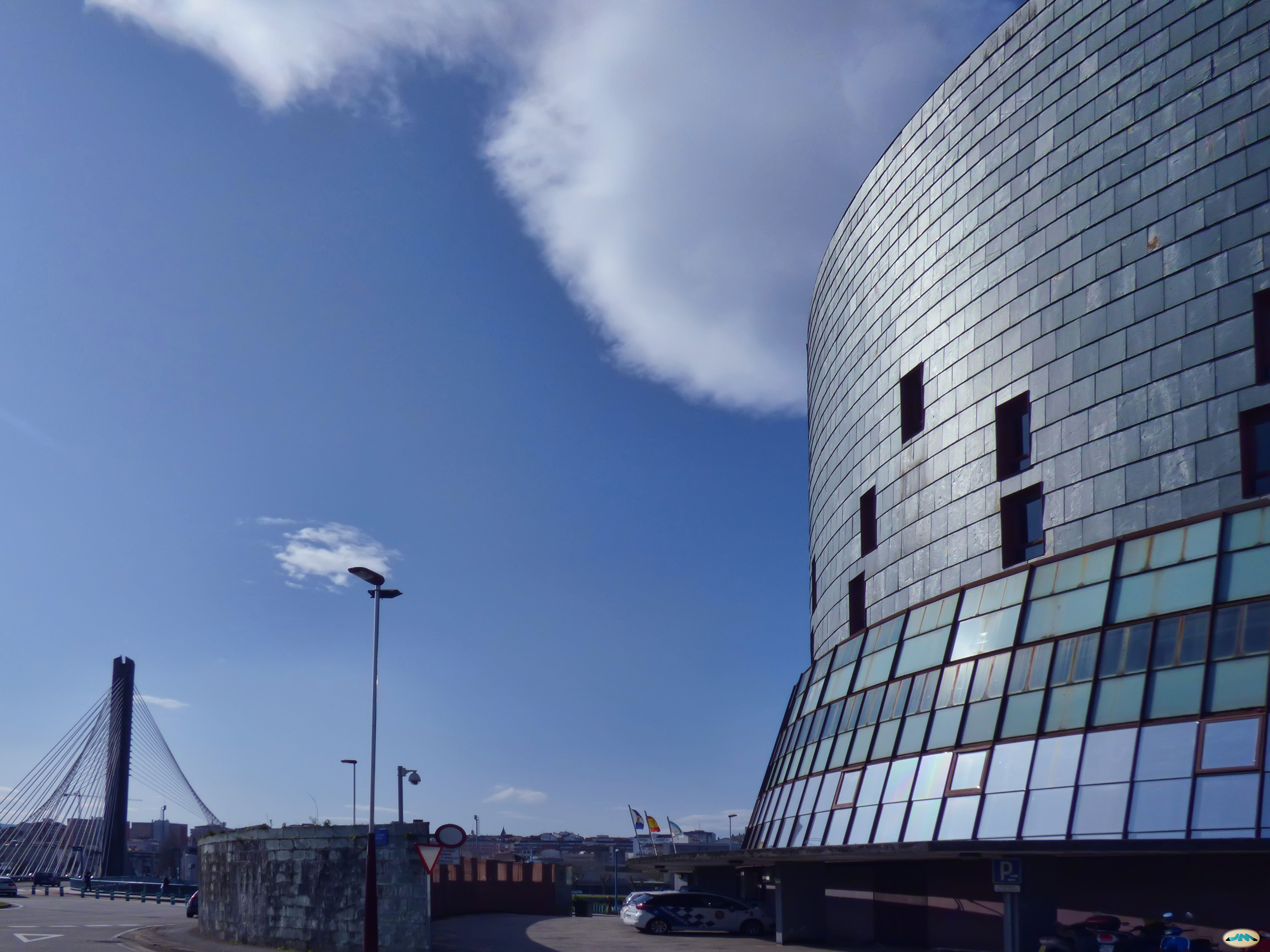
The auditorium of the Congress Hall and the bridge in the background

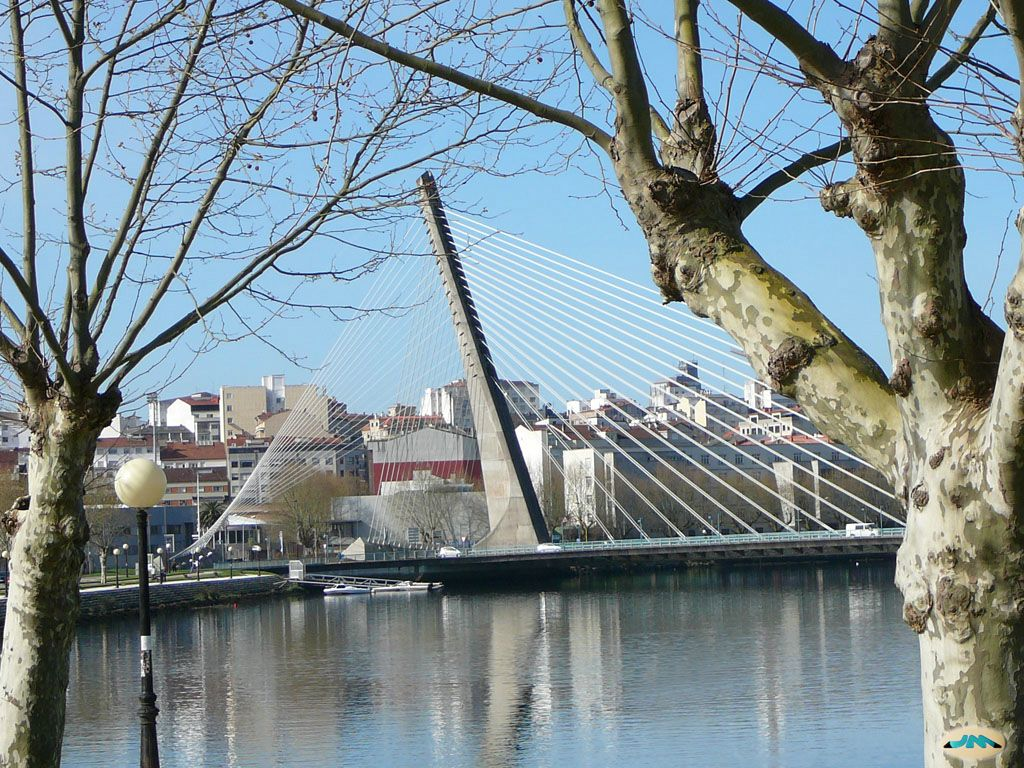

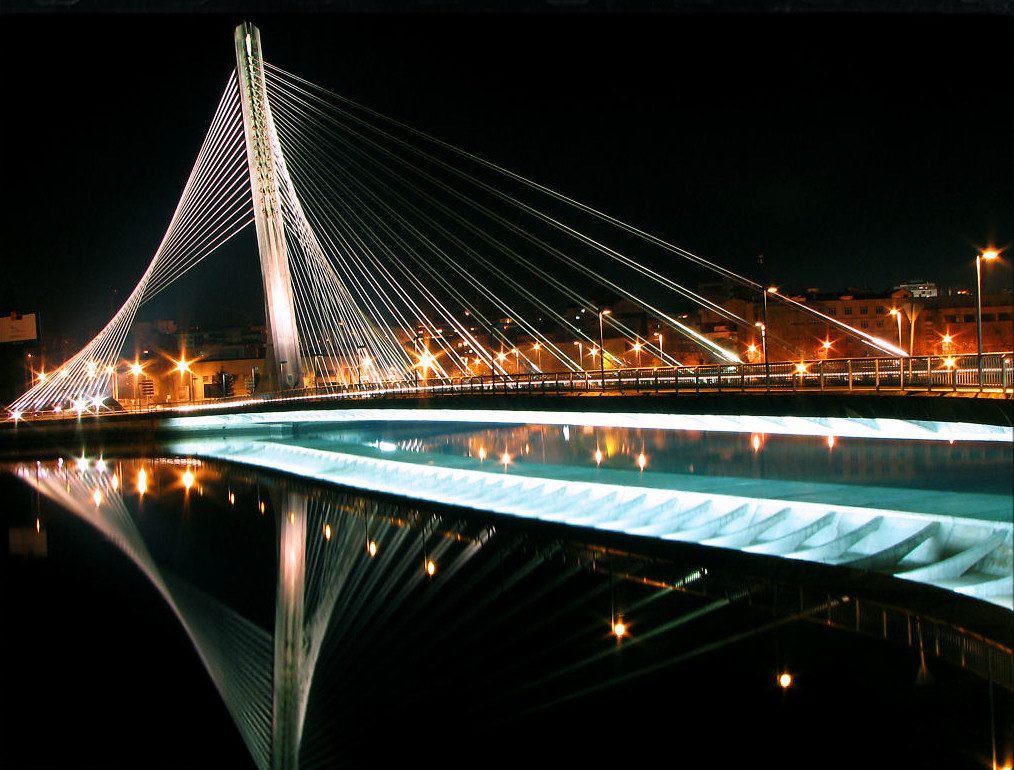
Night view

== See also ==
=== Related articles ===
- Cable-stayed bridge
- List of bridges in Spain
- Currents Bridge
- Burgo Bridge
- Barca Bridge
- Santiago Bridge

=== External links ===
- Structurae: Lerez River Bridge.
- Tirantes Bridge Project.
