= Battle of Puente Sanpayo =

1809 battle during the Peninsular War

- Part of the Peninsular War
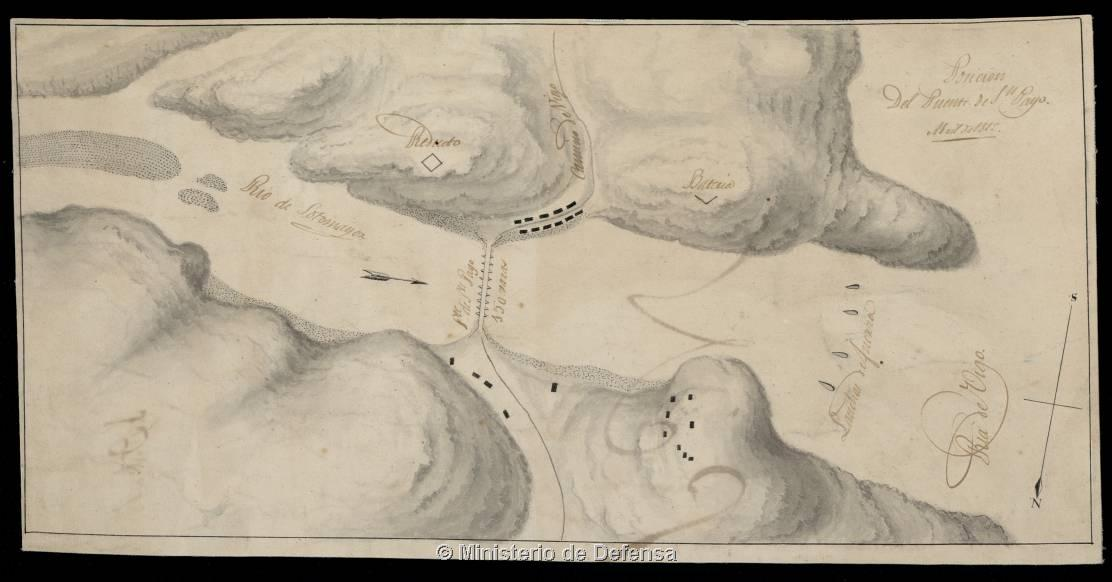
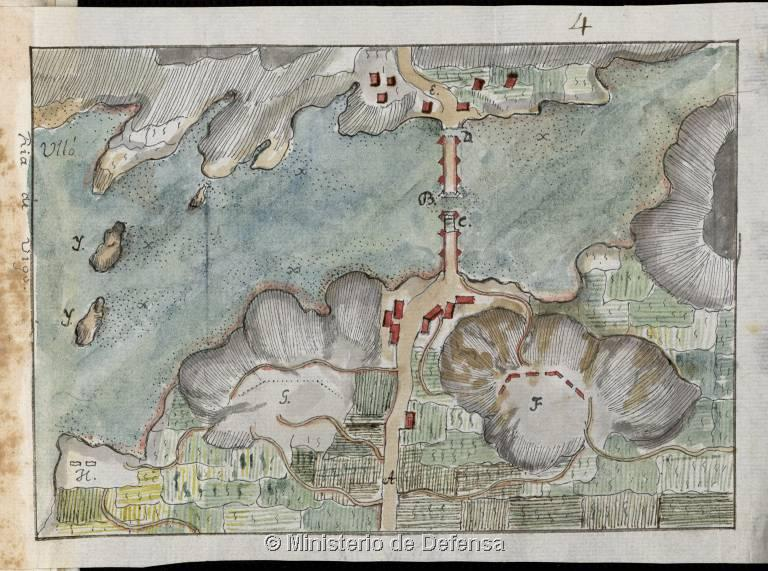
- Battle maps showing the position of the bridge of Sanpayo
Date	7–9 June 1809
Location	Puente Sampayo / Ponte Sampaio / Puente Sanpayo ("Sanpayo Bridge"), Pontevedra, Spain 42.35°N 8.61°W
Result	Spanish victory

Belligerents
(France) French Empire	Spain

Commanders and leaders
(France) Michel Ney	(Spain) Pablo Morillo

Strength
9,200 Unknown number of gunners and artillery	10,000 ("irregular") Unknown number of gunners and artillery

Casualties and losses
600+ killed or wounded	110 killed or wounded

Peninsular War: Second French invasion
current battle

The Battle of Puente Sanpayo or Battle of San Payo (Galician: Ponte Sampaio) took place at the eponymous bridge in Pontevedra, between 7–9 June 1809 during the Peninsular War. It ended with a Spanish victory achieved by Colonel Pablo Morillo who repelled Marshal Michel Ney's attempt to displace him from a strong riverside position.

== Background ==
The Spanish campaign in early 1809 started with the Battle of Uclés.

== Battle ==
The Spanish forces, mostly irregular troops, commanded by Colonel Pablo Morillo defeated the French forces of Marshal Michel Ney. On 7 June, the French launched frontal assaults, but it was unsuccessful; the Spanish volleys proved insurmountable. Over the next two days, Ney attempted to outflank the Spanish by crossing the river at another place, but the Spanish managed to react, prepare defensive erections, and meet him. Moreover, the Spaniards managed to disable the French artillery crews. Ney and his forces were forced to retreat and the French offensive to re-capture the cities of Pontevedra and Vigo was a failure. The battle marked the final evacuation of Galicia by the French army and the creation of a new front.

== Aftermath ==
The Spanish campaign in early 1809 proceeded with the French advance in Catalonia in the Battle of Valls.

== See also ==
- Monument to the heroes of Puente Sampayo
