= Barca Bridge =

Concrete arch bridge in Pontevedra, Spain

Barca Bridge Puente de la Barca
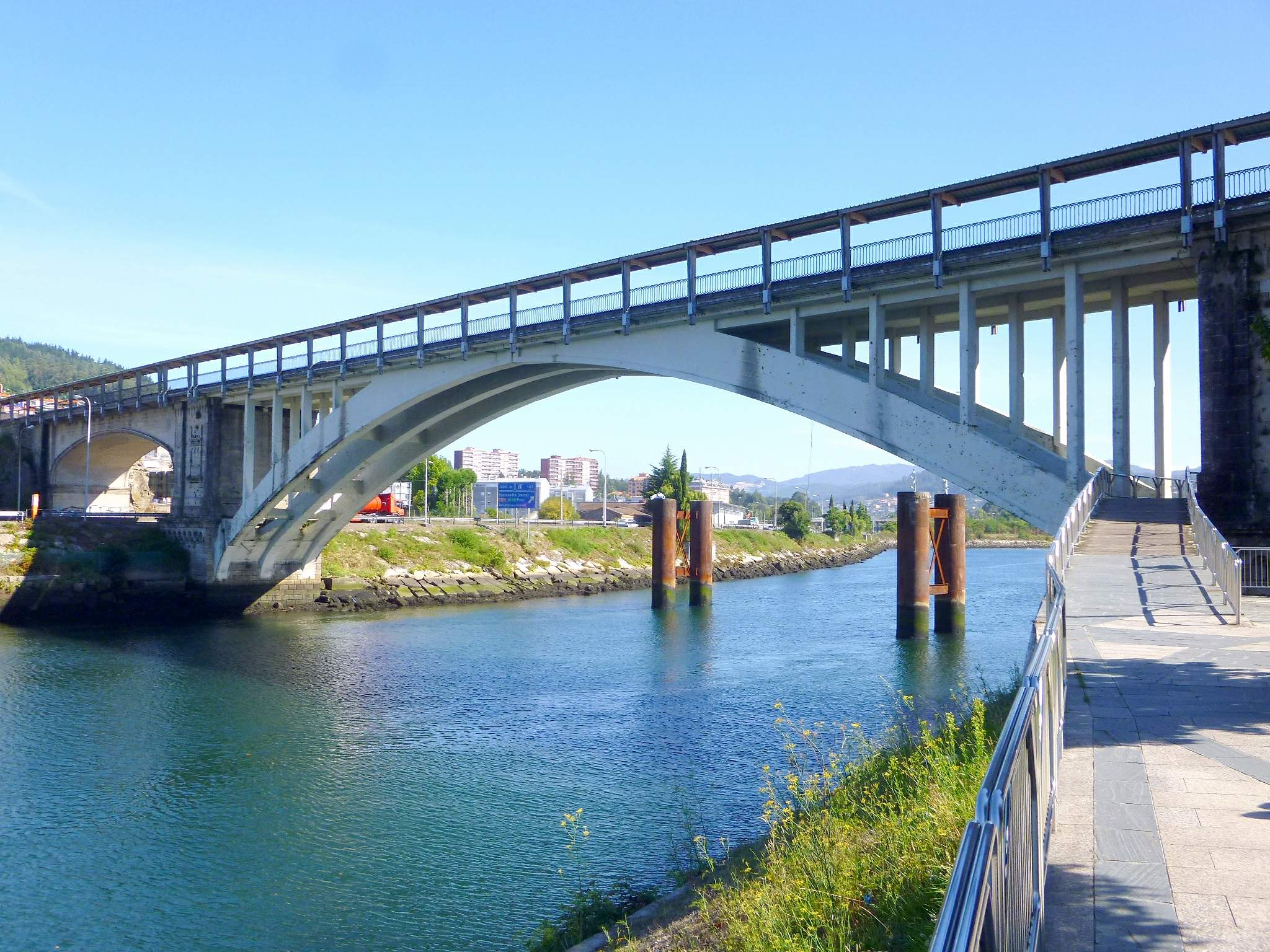
- Barca bridge
- Coordinates: 42.433100°N 8.652900°W
- Carries: Motor vehicles and Pedestrians
- Crosses: Lérez River, Ria de Pontevedra
- Locale: Pontevedra, Galicia, Spain

Characteristics
- Design: Arch
- Material: Concrete
- Total length: 200 m (660 ft)
- Width: 13 m (43 ft)

History
- Designer: Luis Acosta and Eduardo Fungairiño
- Construction start: 1887
- Construction end: 1905
- Opened: 3 July 1905

Location
- Interactive map of Barca Bridge

The Barca Bridge is a bridge over the Lérez River, at its mouth in the Pontevedra Ria, which connects the city of Pontevedra (in the area of A Moureira) with the municipality of Poio in Spain.

== History ==
According to documents from 1197, the boat passage, which gave its name to the place and the bridge, was controlled by the Benedictine monks of the monastery of St John of Poio.

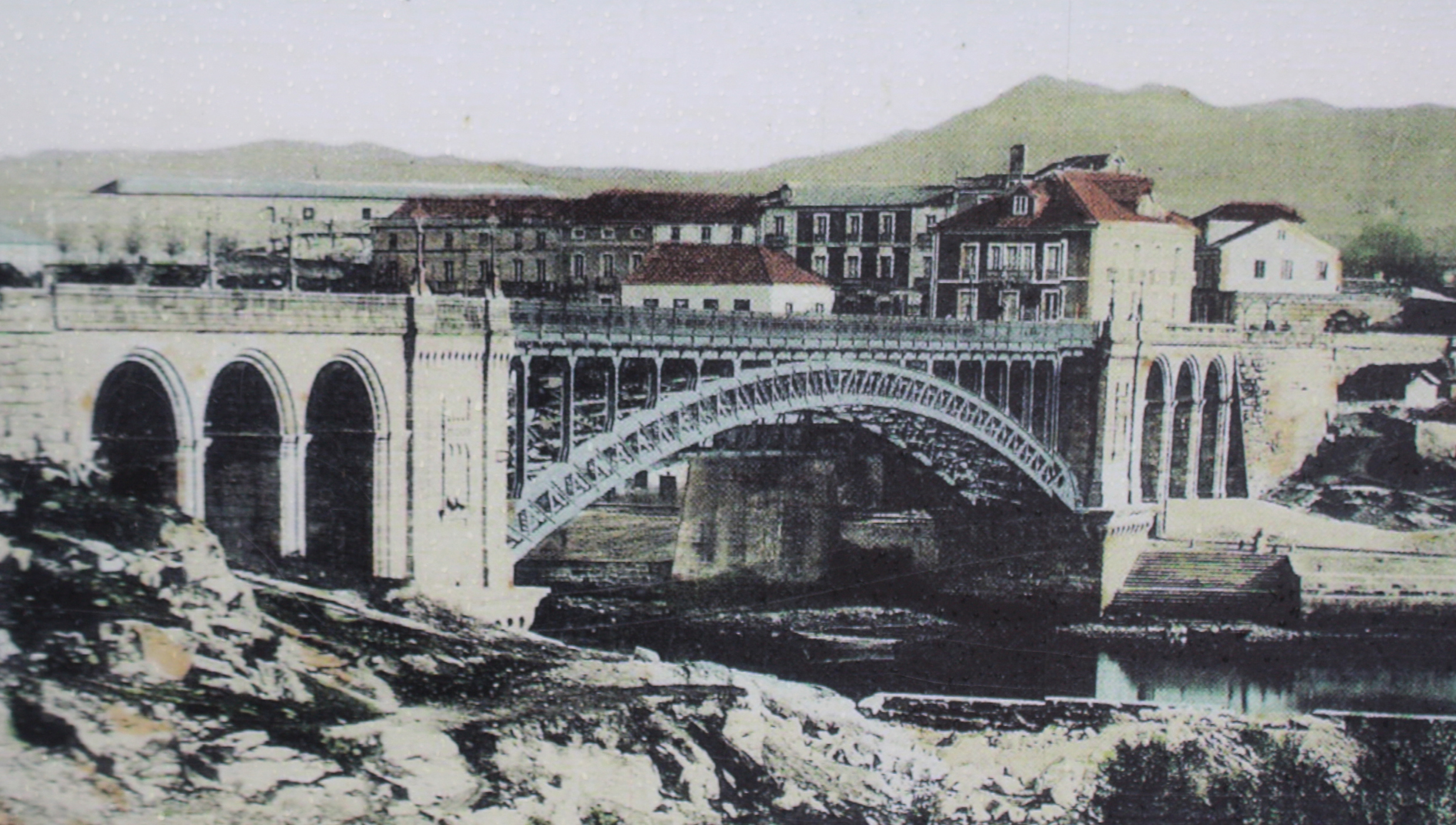
Barque Bridge in the 19th century

In the 19th century, the Society of Seamen of Pontevedra exploited the passage, which led to clashes with the monastery of Poio, the Marquis of Riestra and the Spanish Navy. To avoid these confrontations, given the need to build a bridge, the "Barca bridge building society" was created, formed by the Seafarers' Society, the inhabitants of Poio and capitalist partners.

=== First bridge ===
The first low wooden bridge at La Barca was built in 1867 and began operating in 1871. The structure included a lifting section, which was lifted with a winch to allow the passage of large ships to the Galera and Burgo quays.

=== Second bridge ===
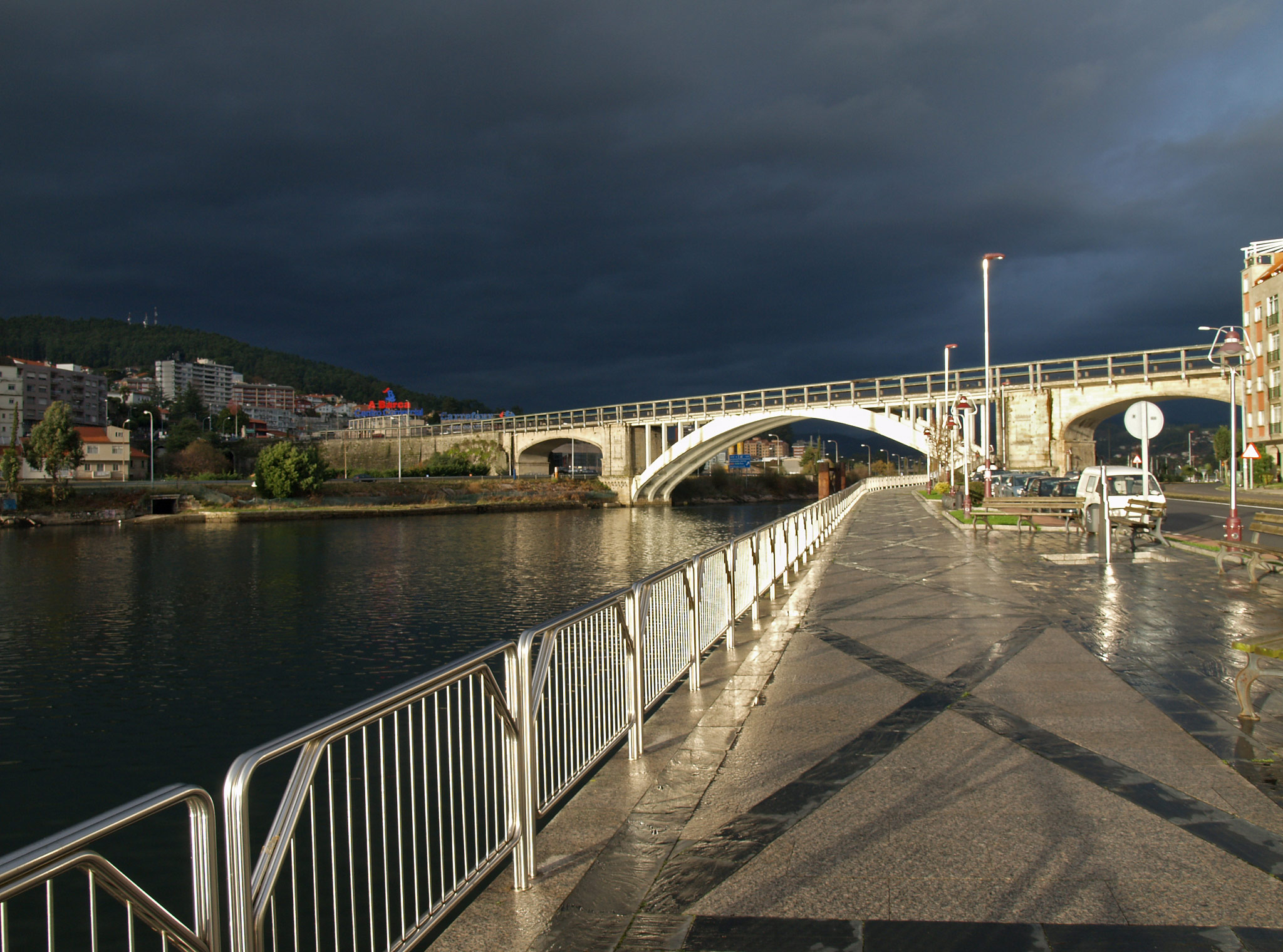
Barca Bridge and Ria de Pontevedra

The administrations, especially the Marquis of Riestra, who had a rural estate and a factory in A Caeira, and politicians such as Eduardo Vincenti or Eugenio Montero Ríos, demanded the construction of a raised bridge and another parallel one for the passage of the railway. In 1887, work began on what was to be a stone bridge. Work was halted for seven years.

In 1894, the construction of a metal bridge became necessary, as it is in contemporary architecture, because of the greater ease of transport, which allowed for more ductile handling and faster execution of the bridge. The work brings together the postulates of metal architecture, which has been using steel as an architectural material since Joseph Paxton built the Crystal Palace pavilion at the London World's Exhibition in 1851.

The project, designed by Luis Acosta and Eduardo Fungueiriño, was carried out by Chavarri, Petrement and Co. During its construction, the workers hired by the industrialist Benito Corbal went on strike for some time, which ended thanks to the mediation of the civil governor, Augusto González Besada.

At the beginning of the 20th century, work began on the central metal arch. The bridge was inaugurated on 3 July 1905. It had an arch with a span of 75 metres (246 ft), resting on two solid masonry supports, and three arches on each side, in which ornamental motifs in the Gothic style, in the taste of the time, were carved. On the eve of the inauguration, load tests were carried out, putting 200 tonnes (200 long tons; 220 short tons) under static load and 13 carriages of 4 tonnes (3.9 long tons; 4.4 short tons) each under dynamic load.

The bridge became a dividing line in the area of A Moureira, leaving on one side the residential area of the sailors, on the other the area of taverns and brothels.

=== Renovations ===
In 1945, work began to replace the metal structure with a concrete arch of 72 metres (236 ft) span designed by Eduardo Torroja Miret. However, the work was not completed until 1950.

In 1989, the masonry abutment on the south side was modified from three arches to a wider one, below which is Corbaceiras Avenue. Two years later, the twin abutment on the north side was also widened to accommodate the AP-9 below.

Nowadays, after renovation work in the mid-1990s and 2010s, the bridge has two-way traffic for vehicles and covered pavements for pedestrians.

== Description ==
The bridge owes its name to the fact that in the past, the passage from Pontevedra to Poio was made by boat.

The current bridge is formed by a large reinforced concrete arch with a 72-metre (236 ft) span over the Ria de Pontevedra and two smaller low masonry arches with a 25-metre (82 ft) span on the landward sides. It is decorated with bas-reliefs at the bottom of the large concrete support pillars covered in granite.

The bridge is 13 metres (43 ft) wide and 200 metres (660 ft) long. The span of the arch supports two lanes of road traffic and two pavements.

To protect the passers-by from the winter winds and rains, there is a wooden awning over the pavements of the bridge.

== Gallery ==
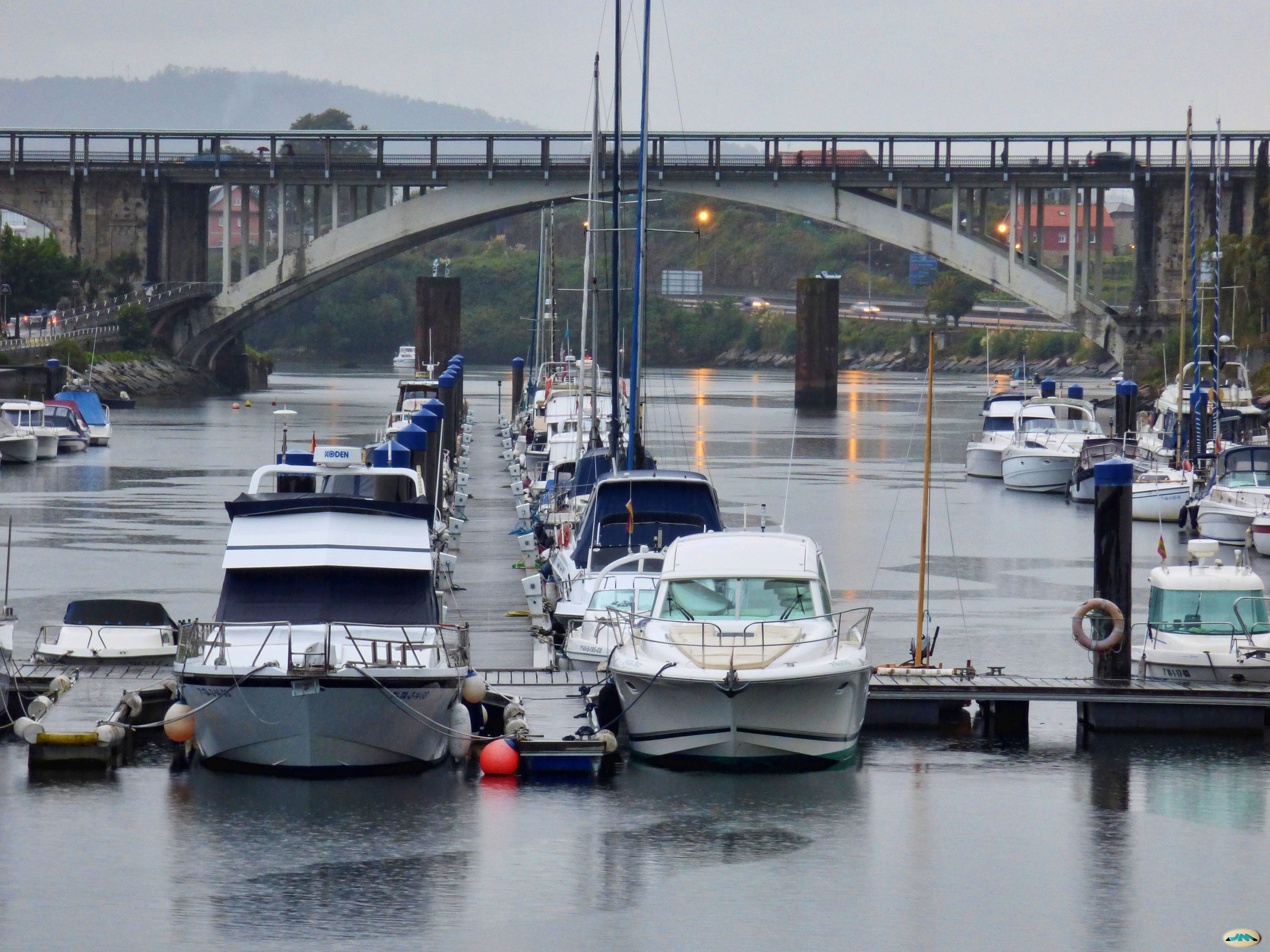
Barca Bridge and marina

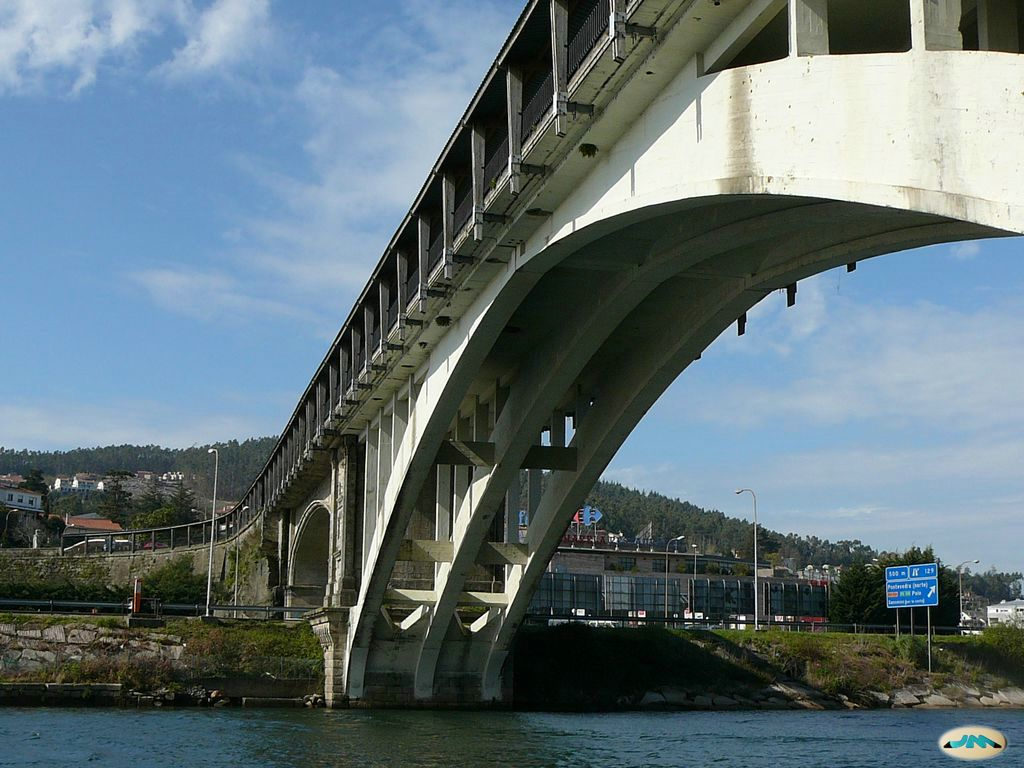
Concrete bridge arch dating from 1950

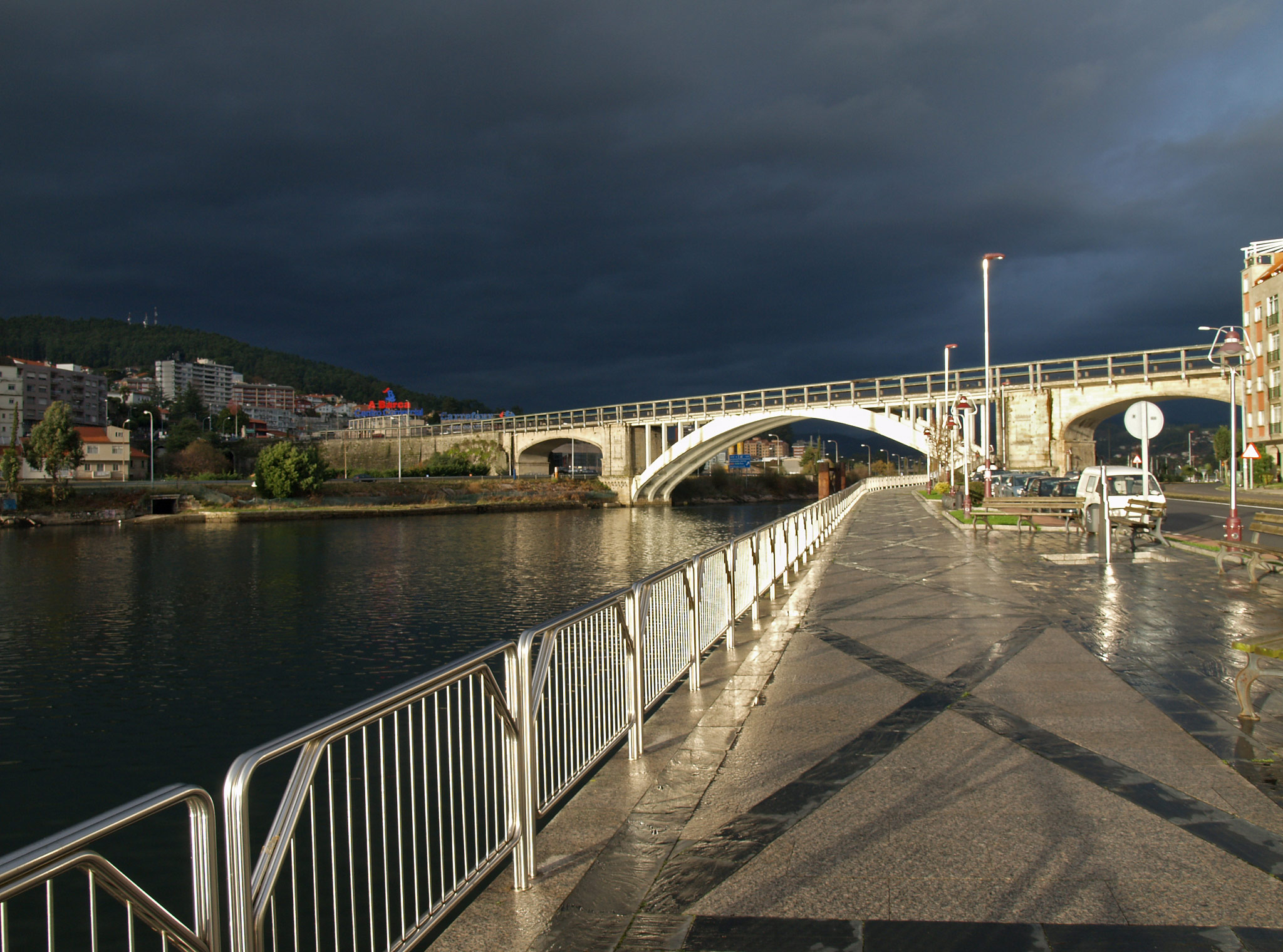
Bridge and Paseo Marítimo de Pontevedra

== See also ==
=== Related articles ===
- Burgo Bridge
- Tirantes Bridge
- Currents Bridge
- Santiago Bridge
- List of bridges in Spain
- Plaza de Concepción Arenal

=== External links ===
- A Barca Bridge on the website Structurae
- La Barca Bridge
