= Plaza de Concepción Arenal =

Square in Pontevedra, Spain

Concepción Arenal square
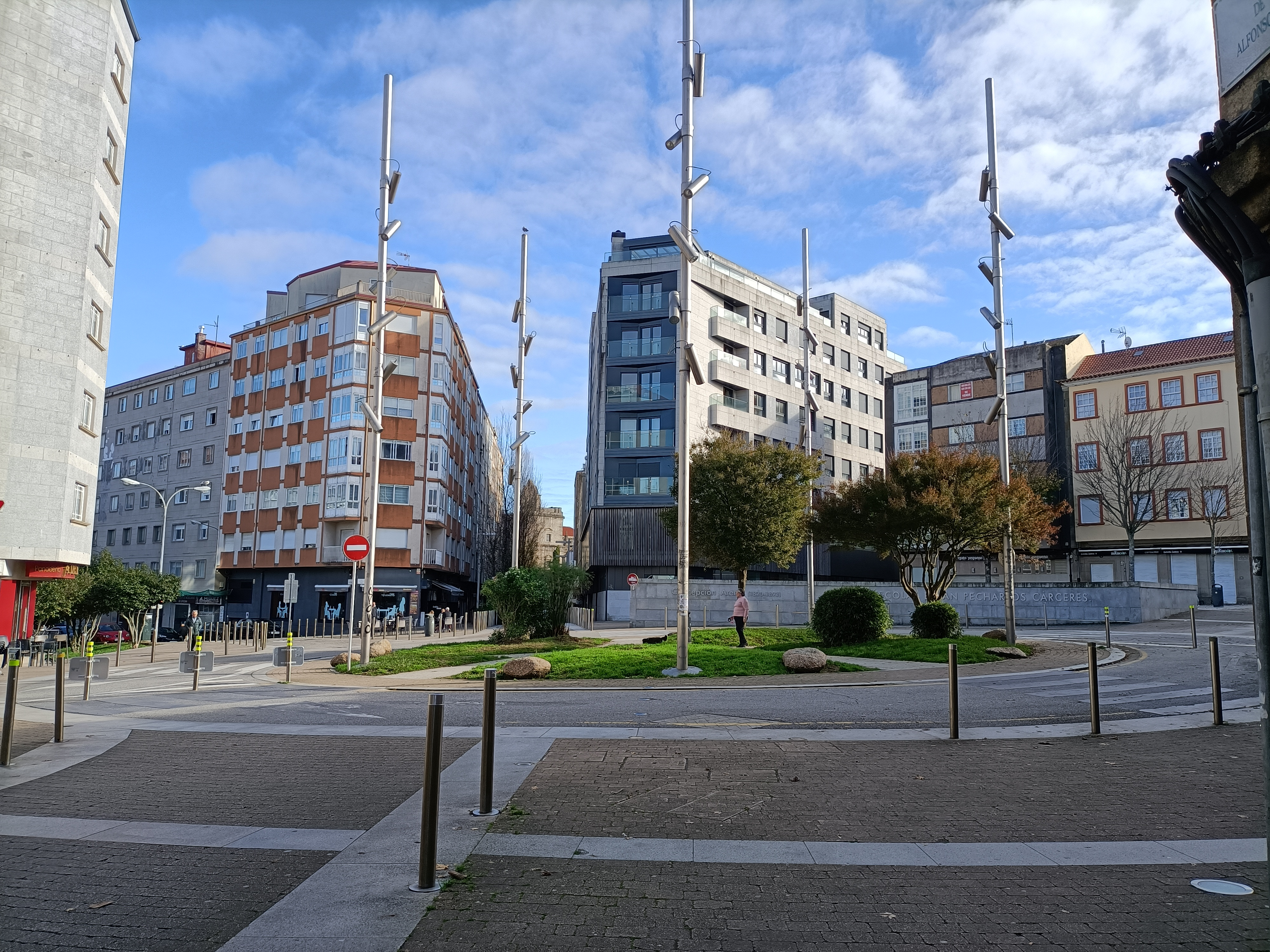
- Concepción Arenal square in 2023
- Native name: Plaza de Concepción Arenal (Spanish)
- Type: plaza
- Maintained by: Pontevedra City Council
- Location: Pontevedra, Spain
- Postal code: 36002
- Coordinates: 42.432667°N 8.650056°W

Construction
- Completion: 1908

The Plaza de Concepción Arenal is an early 20th-century square in the Spanish city of Pontevedra, on the edge of the A Moureira area.

== Origin of the name ==
The square owes its name to the Galician writer and activist Concepción Arenal (1820–1893), who lived in Pontevedra at 27 Oliva Street between 1889 and 1890, where she organised a prestigious meeting of intellectuals.

== History ==
The square was created following the construction of the nearby Barca bridge. On 17 July 1904, the Pontevedra City Council, on the occasion of the improvement of the street system in the area with the imminent opening of this bridge over the River Lérez and the Ria de Pontevedra, proposed the creation of a square at the junction of Alfonso XIII and Herreros streets, on a plot of land donated by José Riestra López, Marquis of Riestra.

The square was located in an expanding part of the city, as the construction of the nearby bridge was accompanied by the building of the new Saint Ferdinand barracks between 1905 and 1909, whose long side façade on the General Martitegui street provided access to the new square from the España square.

Work on the square was completed in 1908, as evidenced by the municipal plenary session of 17 March 1908, which decided to name the new square Concepción Arenal.

The Concepción Arenal square was completely refurbished in the 21st century, becoming semi-pedestrianised and configured around a central roundabout. Work began in 2005 and was completed in 2006. It was reopened to restricted traffic on 27 April 2006.

== Description ==
The square, which covers 2,500 m^{2}, has an irregular circular shape and the six streets of Alfonso XIII, de la Barca, General Martitegui, Herreros, Condesa de Pardo Bazán and Jofre de Tenorio converge there.

The square is semi-pedestrianised and has a circular configuration with several concentric circles in the paving, the central point of which is a pedestrian roundabout crossed by several paths, with five columns of floodlights, lawns and trees. Around this roundabout, there is a single circular lane for vehicles with a speed limit of 20 km/h, which distributes the limited traffic from the surrounding streets. The square is paved with sepia-coloured cobblestones, bordered by circular and horizontal granite strips that structure the design. On the eastern side of the square is a large granite platform, situated at a higher level, which acts as a small square within the square and is equipped with benches. It is framed by granite walls and, on its western side, offers a kind of small viewpoint over the roundabout, whose front wall bears an inscription in Galician that recalls the writer to whom the square is dedicated: "Concepción Arenal 1820-1893. Abride escolas e han pechar os cárceres" (Open schools and you will close the prisons).

The Concepción Arenal square boasts a number of trees: a palmate maple and greenery in the central roundabout, as well as a red maple and two silver maples at one end of the paved square on the east side.

The square is surrounded by modern buildings averaging six and seven storeys high, and is dominated on the south side by the Froebel School building. This building, approved for construction in 1910 after the purchase of land from the Marquis of Riestra, was designed in 1914 and dedicated to the new Froebel teaching system. Work began in 1924 and was completed in 1936. It has two floors and a basement, as well as corner towers. It anticipates rationalist forms and has a multitude of large, symmetrical windows set vertically to bring lots of light into the classrooms. Inside, the building has a large glazed courtyard with perimeter arcades.

== Gallery ==
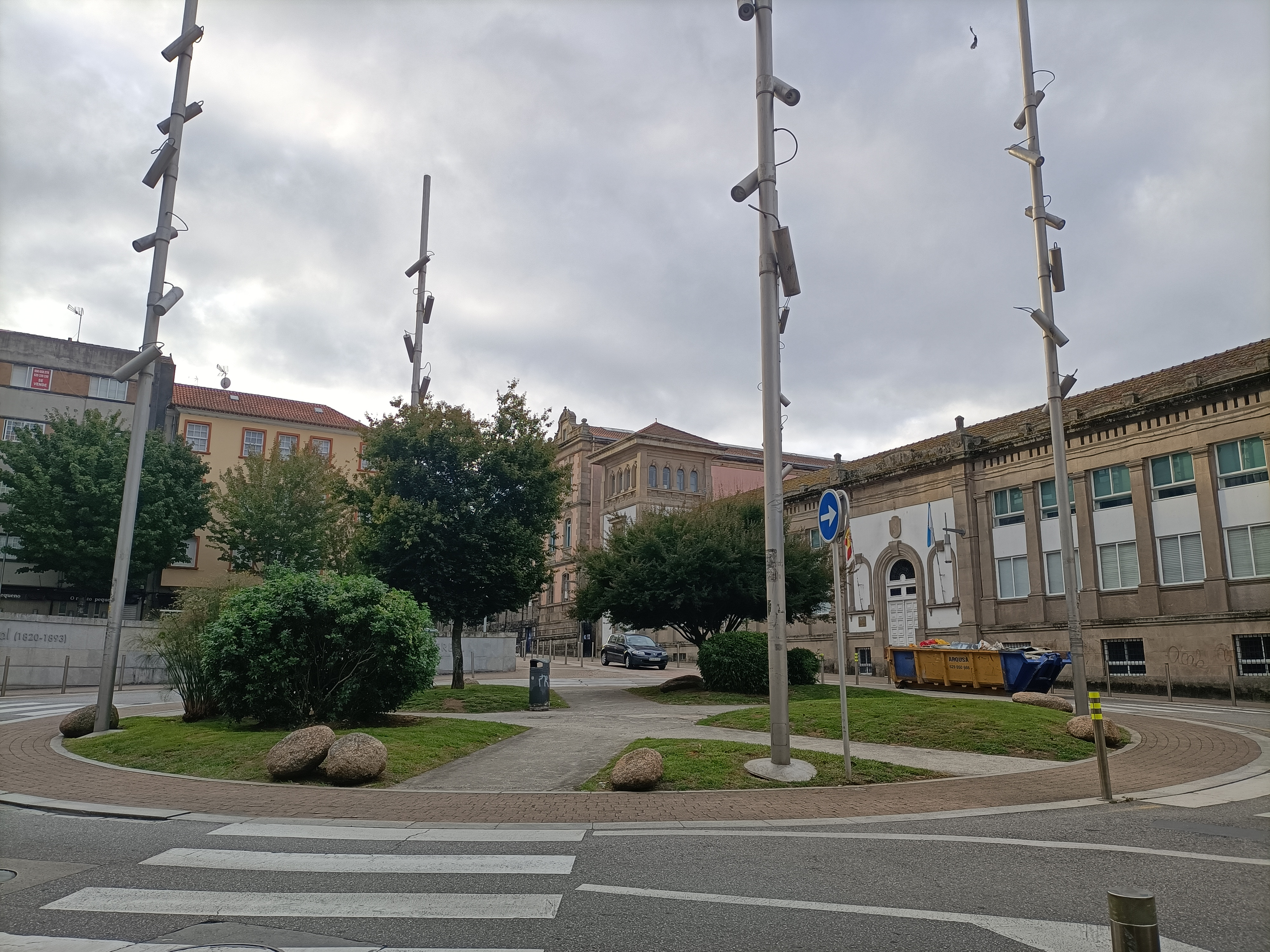
Concepción Arenal square with the Froebel school building on the right

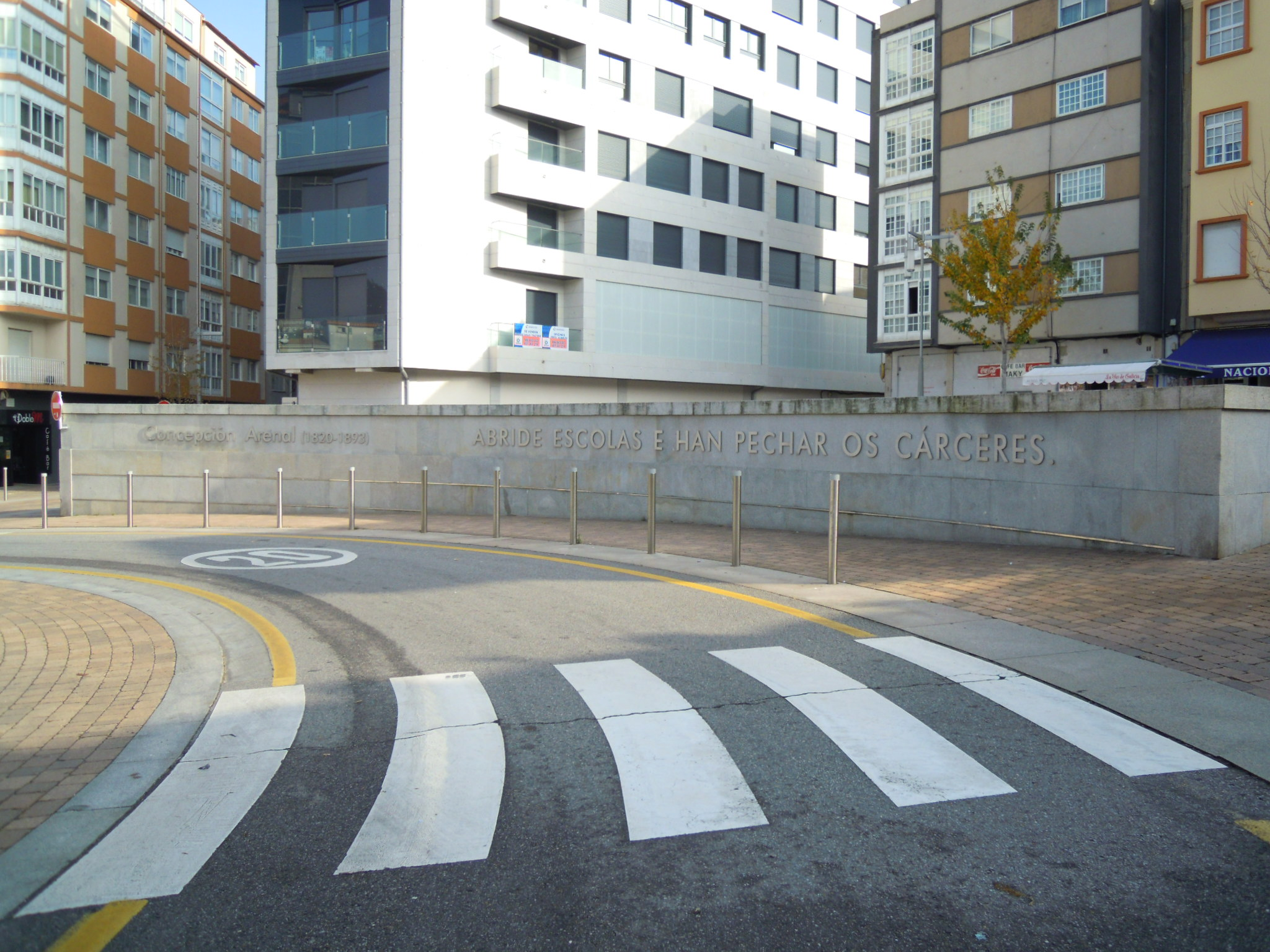
The square with the inscription dedicated to Concepción Arenal

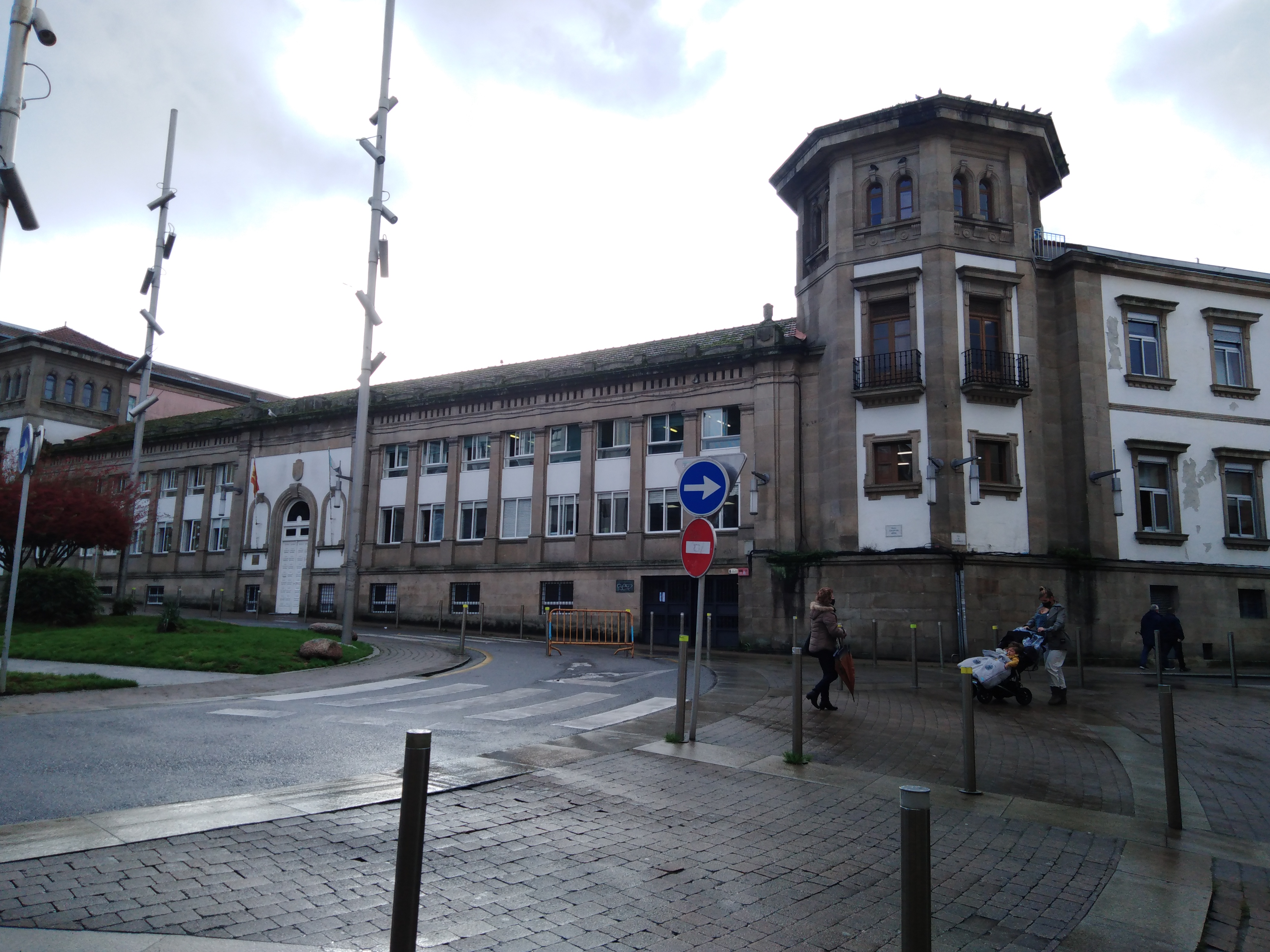
Froebel school Building

== See also ==
=== Bibliography ===
- Blanco Dios, Jaime Bernardo; Castro González, Amancio (2010). As árbores da cidade de Pontevedra (in Galician). Pontevedra: Concello de Pontevedra. p. 41; 44–45. ISBN 978-84-606-5147-5.
- Fontoira Surís, Rafael (2009). Pontevedra monumental (in Galician). Pontevedra: Diputación de Pontevedra. p. 423. ISBN 9788484573272.
- Juega Puig, Juan (2000). As rúas de Pontevedra (in Galician). Pontevedra: Diputación de Pontevedra. pp. 71–72. ISBN 84-8457-044-4.

=== Related articles ===
- A Moureira
- Barca Bridge
- Saint Ferdinand Barracks
