= Burgo Bridge =

Stone arch bridge in Pontevedra, Spain

Burgo Bridge Puente del Burgo
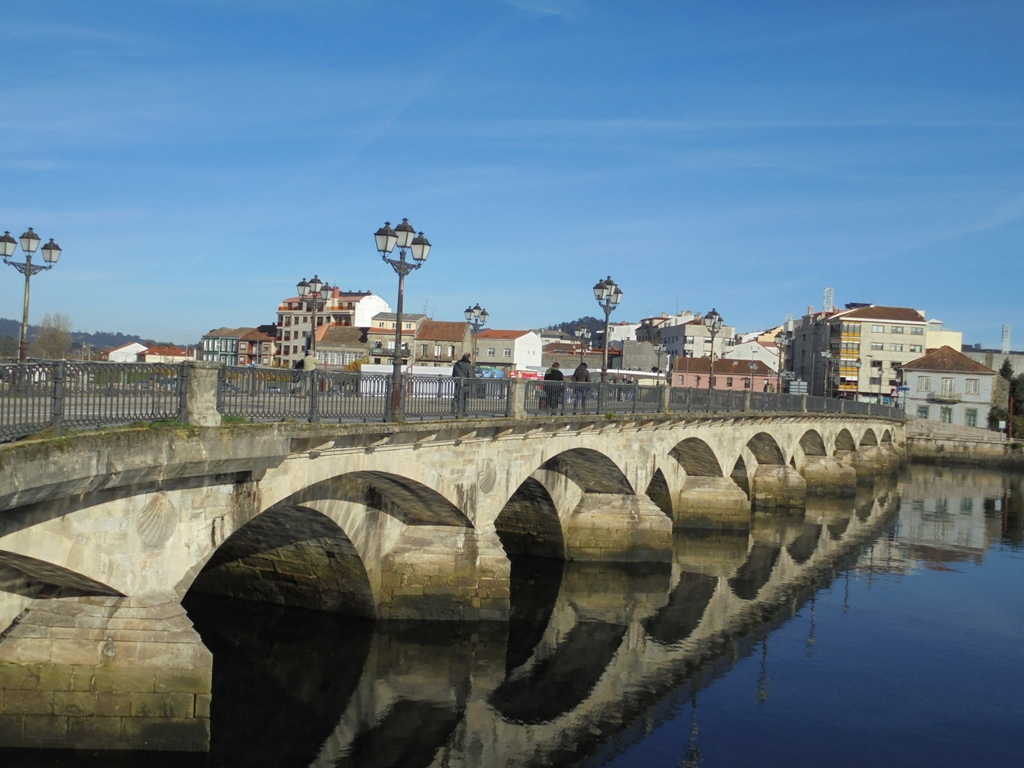
- Burgo bridge
- Coordinates: 42.435907°N 8.643795°W
- Carries: Pedestrians
- Crosses: Lérez River
- Locale: Pontevedra, Galicia, Spain

Characteristics
- Design: Arch
- Material: Stone
- Total length: 158 m (518 ft)
- Width: 11.2 m (37 ft)

History
- Construction end: 12th century

The Burgo Bridge (Puente del Burgo) is a medieval bridge, built over an older bridge of Roman origin, which crosses the Lérez River in the city of Pontevedra, Spain. It is on the route of the Portuguese Way to the north of the historic centre of Pontevedra and to the south of the Burgo neighbourhood. Between the arches above the pillars are carved the famous stone pilgrim's shells.

== History ==
The present medieval bridge is the heir to the first Roman bridge over which the Roman road XIX passed according to Antonine Itinerary. This bridge still existed in the 12th century but was in ruins. It remained for a very long time the only crossing point of the Lérez River on the Portuguese Way.

The first references to the current bridge date back to 1165, when King Ferdinand the Catholic of León and King Afonso I of Portugal signed the Peace of Lérez in the super flumen Lerice in vetula ponte, designating the old Roman bridge as the Old Bridge. In the 15th century, the bridge had 15 arches, losing one arch when a new levee was built to increase the depth of the port.

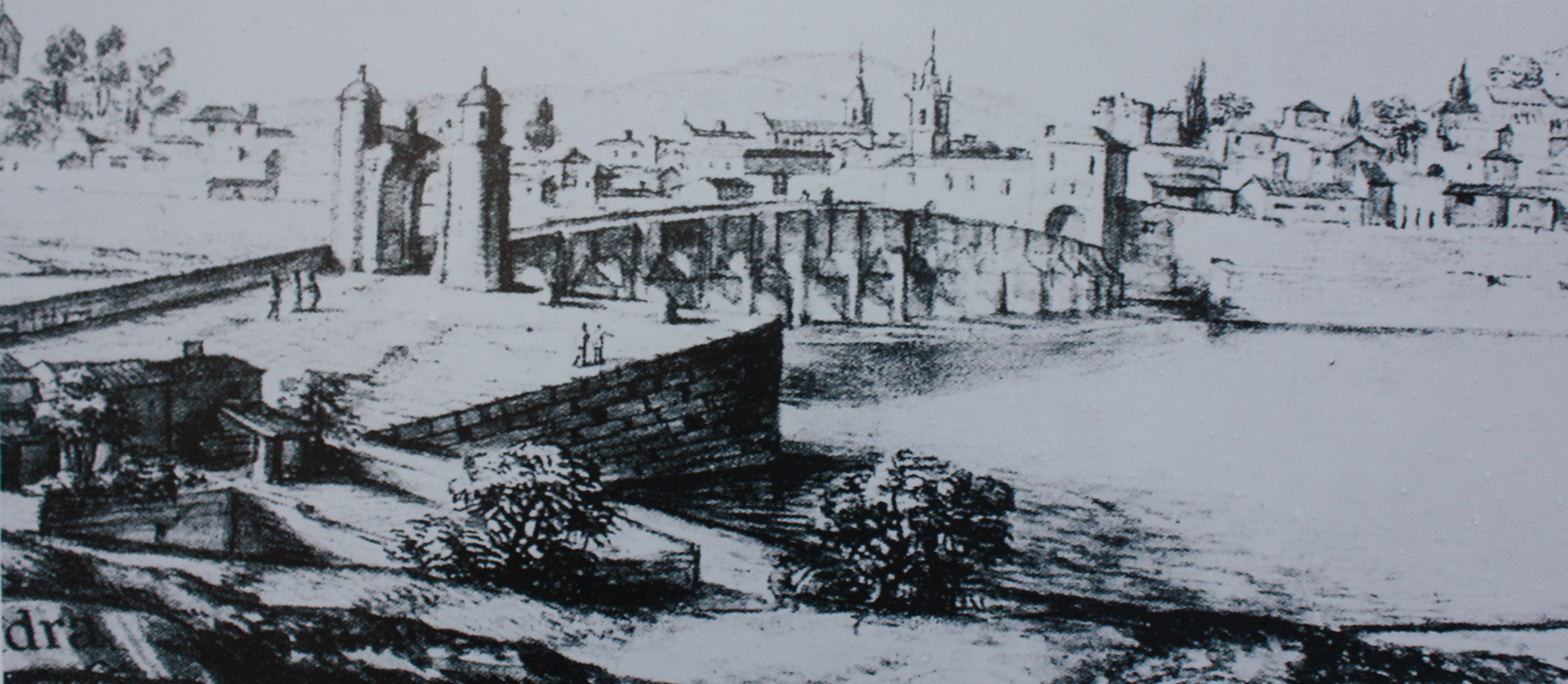
The Burgo bridge in 1669 from an illustration by Pier Maria Baldi

In the 16th century, the bridge had two defensive towers, one on each side of the river, the one closest to the town being connected to the walls of Pontevedra and annexed to the old prison, as shown in the drawings by Pier Maria Baldi and Celso Garcia de la Riega. On 26 November 1646, an enormous flood of the Lérez almost brought the bridge down. The towers were destroyed by the English in 1719. One of them was rebuilt, but it disappeared for good in 1805. In the centre there was a calvary which, in the middle of the 19th century, was moved to the surroundings of the Plaza Alonso de Fonseca, next to the Basilica of Saint Mary Major. At that time, the bridge had only 12 visible arches. The bridge stands on the city's coat of arms with its tower and calvary.

The first major renovation of the bridge was undertaken in 1886 under the direction of the engineer Prudencio Guadalfajara for its repair and enlargement. In 1890, the stone parapet was removed and a metal guard rail was installed.

Between 1953 and 1954, a major renovation and widening was carried out, with two lanes for vehicles and pavements on both sides for pedestrians. The idea of covering the pavements was also considered, which in the end was not done due to lack of budget. The scallops sculpted on the arches were a work commissioned in 1950 from Raymundo Vazquez and carried out by one of his stonemasons.

In 1988, concrete platforms were built for the extension of Buenos Aires Avenue, supported by pillars, which concealed the 11th arch of the bridge below. During the excavations, Hadrian's famous milliarium, dated 134 A.D, was discovered.

In 2006, an archaeological excavation uncovered arches number 14 and 15 of the bridge and the 15th century harbour jetty with a blind broken arch. During the excavation, archaeologists found two milliaria, one dedicated to Emperor Maximinus Daza of the 4th century and the other to Emperor Nerva of the 1st century.

=== Pedestrianisation ===
In mid-2019, work began on the complete pedestrianisation of the bridge and was completed in 2020, with the installation of new night lighting for the bridge., Thanks to this renovation, a new granite covering was put in place and the old guard rail was removed and replaced by a new one,

== Description ==
It is a stone arch pedestrian bridge that has undergone alterations at different times. Made of granite, it consists of eleven low semicircular arches. The bridge has 10 visible arches, starlings, a 1.10-metre high grey galvanised steel guard rail with integrated lighting and stone scallops added as medallions between the arches above the bridge piers in the 1950s.

The Burgo bridge is 11.2 metres wide and 158 metres long. The stone pavement incorporated in 2020 small blue lights that mark the Portuguese Way.

== Culture ==
At the southern end of the bridge, at its confluence with the old town of Pontevedra, there is an archaeological area with the remains of the original medieval bridge (especially arches 14 and 15) and the medieval port, which had been buried by works carried out over the centuries.

== See also ==
=== Bibliography ===
- Aganzo, Carlos (2010). Pontevedra. Ciudades con encanto (in Spanish). Madrid: El País-Aguilar. pp. 82–83. ISBN 978-8403509344.
- Nadal, Paco (2012). Rias Baixas. Escapadas (in Spanish). Madrid: El País-Aguilar. pp. 34–35. ISBN 978-8403501089.
- Riveiro Tobío, Elvira (2008). Descubrir Pontevedra (in Spanish). Pontevedra: Edicións do Cumio. p. 56. ISBN 9788482890852.

=== Related articles ===
- Arch bridge
- The Portuguese Way
- List of bridges in Spain
- O Burgo
- Puente Sampayo Bridge

=== External links ===
- Burgo bridge on the site Structurae
- Burgo bridge documentary – exhibition – history – renovation on the site Burgo Pontevedra.gal
- The Burgo Bridge on the site Visit-Pontevedra
- Information about the Burgo Bridge on the site Rias Baixas Tourism.
