= Plaza de Toros de Pontevedra =

Bullring in Pontevedra, Spain

- Coso de San Roque
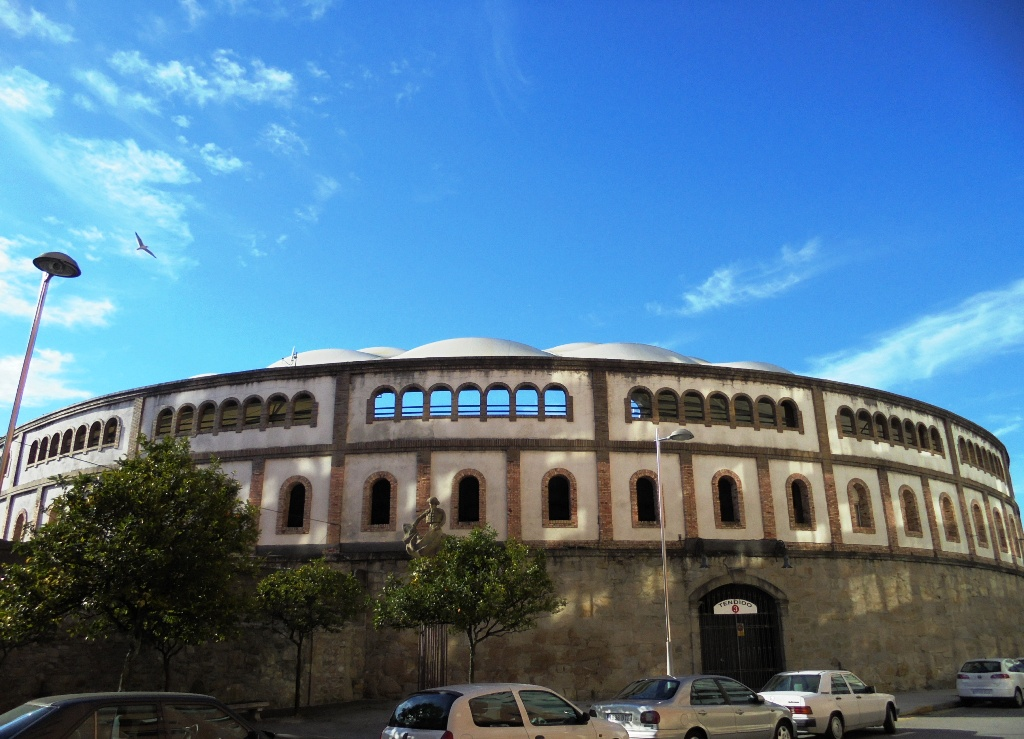
- Pontevedra Bullring
- Interactive map of Plaza de Toros de Pontevedra
- Location: Nostradamo Lourido Street, s/n, 36002, Pontevedra, Galicia, Spain
- Coordinates: 42°25′48″N 8°39′06″W
- Owner: Hermanos Lozano
- Capacity: 7,800

Construction
- Built: 1899-1900
- Opened: 12 August 1900
- Renovated: 1996
- Architect: Siro Borrajo Montenegro

The Plaza de Toros de Pontevedra (Spain) is the bullring of the Spanish city of Pontevedra and the only one in the autonomous community of Galicia. It has a capacity of 7,800 spectators and is classified as the second category of Spanish bullring. The current bullring replaced a wooden one dating from 1892, although the tradition of bullfighting in Pontevedra dates back to the 17th century.

== History ==
Before the existence of the bullring, the bullfighting took place since the 17th century in the Herrería and Alhóndiga squares, closing the entrances with boards and reserving the right to use the windows of some houses to watch the festivities. These shows are mentioned in Prudencio Landín Tobío's chronicles of the city of Pontevedra.

In 1892, the captain of the artillery, Benito Calderón Ozores, brother of the Marquise of Riestra and son-in-law of Eugenio Montero Ríos, in association with two people from Córdoba, promoted the construction of a wooden bullring in the Campo de la Torre, on the same site as the current stone bullring. In 1896, a request was received by the City Council for the construction of a stone bullring. The request was approved on 5 November of the same year, but the construction project was put on hold until 1899.

The architect Siro Borrajo Montenegro, was in charge of the direction of the works which started in October 1899. To be precise, on the 8th, to the rhythm of the paso doble played by the orphanage's brass band. Before a year from the beginning of the works, the bullring was inaugurated by the Bullfighters Emilio Torres "Bombita" and Ricardo Torres "Bombita chico" who fought bulls from Salas. This was on 12 August 1900 in the neighbourhood of San Roque, the same place where the wooden square was located.

Since 1975 the bullring has been owned by the Lozano brothers.

== Description ==
The building has a two-storey plan, the first section being reserved for the stands and the second for the boxes and covered seating. The bullring is covered. In 1996, the bullring was renovated with a roof, made of a fabric similar to that of sailing ships, which shelters the spectators and part of the arena, while leaving the centre of the arena open. This PVC membrane roof with a surface area of 4300 m2 was inaugurated on 25 July, during a bullfight in which the bullfighters fought the fighting bulls of El Torreón and in which the Valencian matadors Enrique Ponce and Vicente Barrera, as well as the Colombian César Rincón were announced.

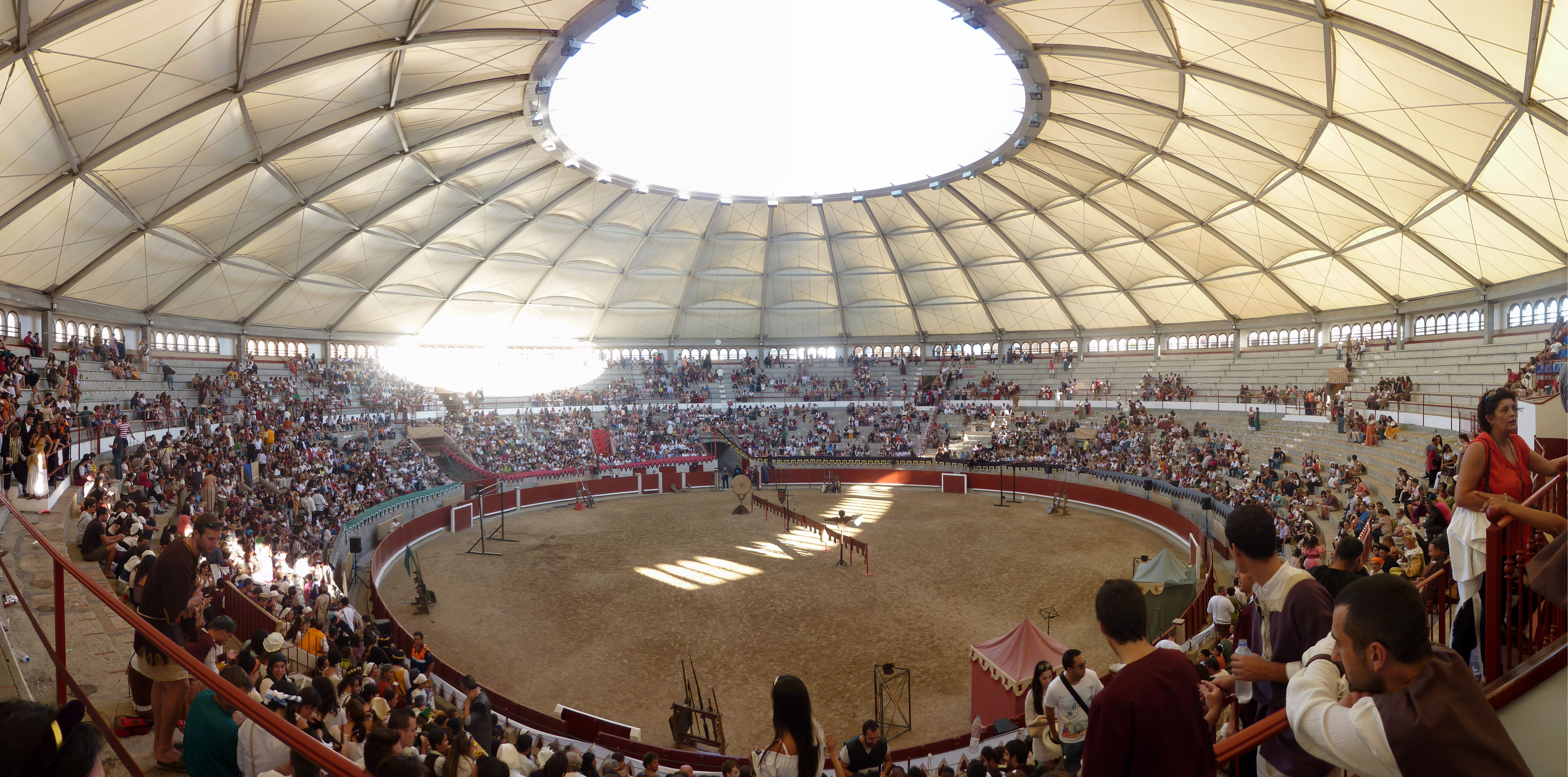
Interior of the covered bullring

The bullring in Pontevedra is characterised by its large number of supporters. The sunny stands of the bullring are full of peñas who, with their colourful clothes and joy, create a great atmosphere every afternoon of the bullfight. About 50 groups of peña members celebrate their annual Feria de la Virgen Peregrina. This phenomenon of peñas is not a new fashion, but it is something rooted in Pontevedra.

== Reputation of the Pontevedra bullring ==
The Pontevedra bullring is the only one in Galicia and the venue for most of the bullfights in the northwest of the Iberian Peninsula. The feria de la Peregrina is one of the bullfighting cycles of the Spanish season that has the best box-office results, generating great expectation from its posters. The bullfighting activity is concentrated in the Feria de La Peregrina, patron saint of the province of Pontevedra, which is held every year from the second Sunday of August.

== Gallery ==
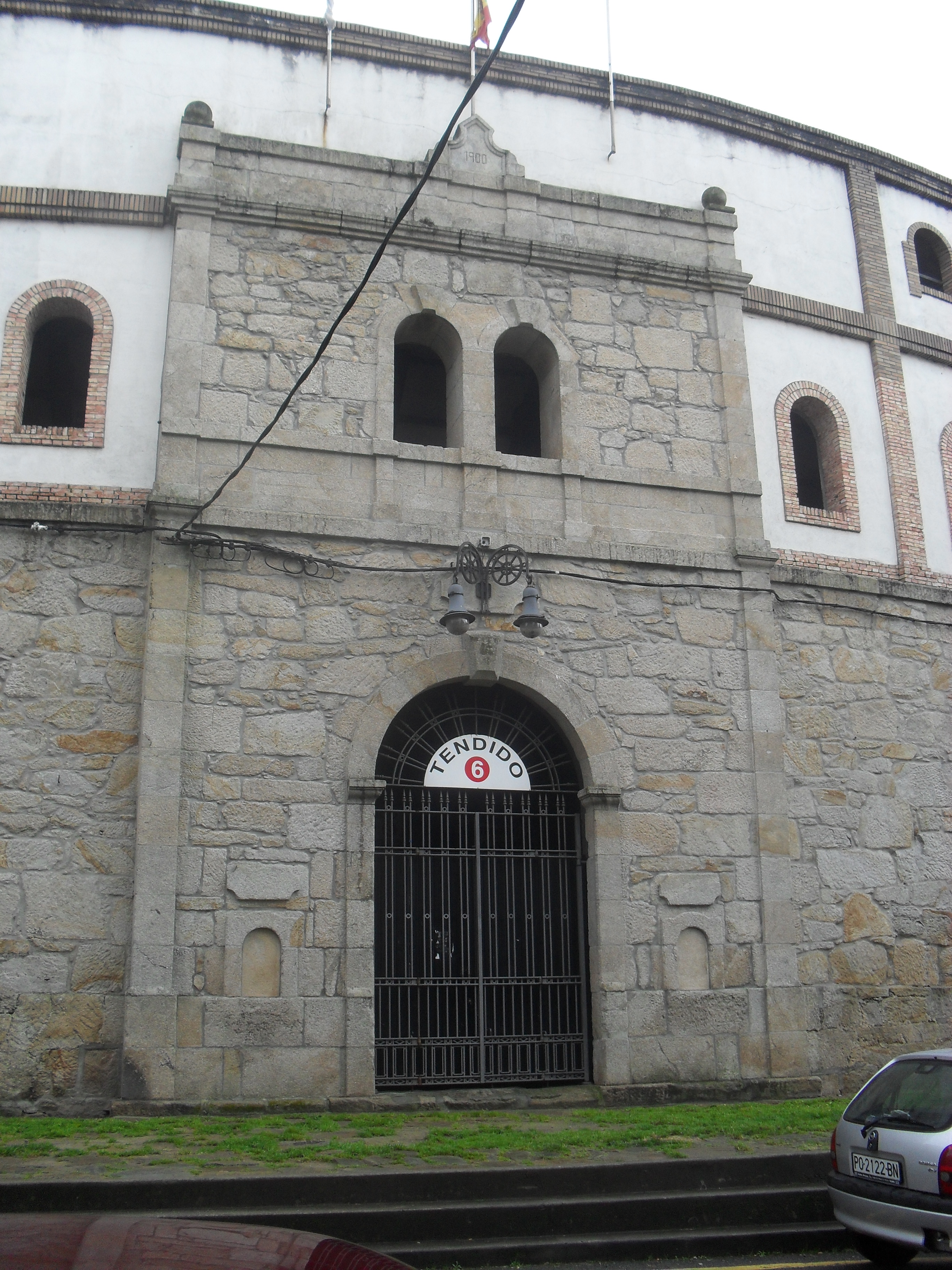

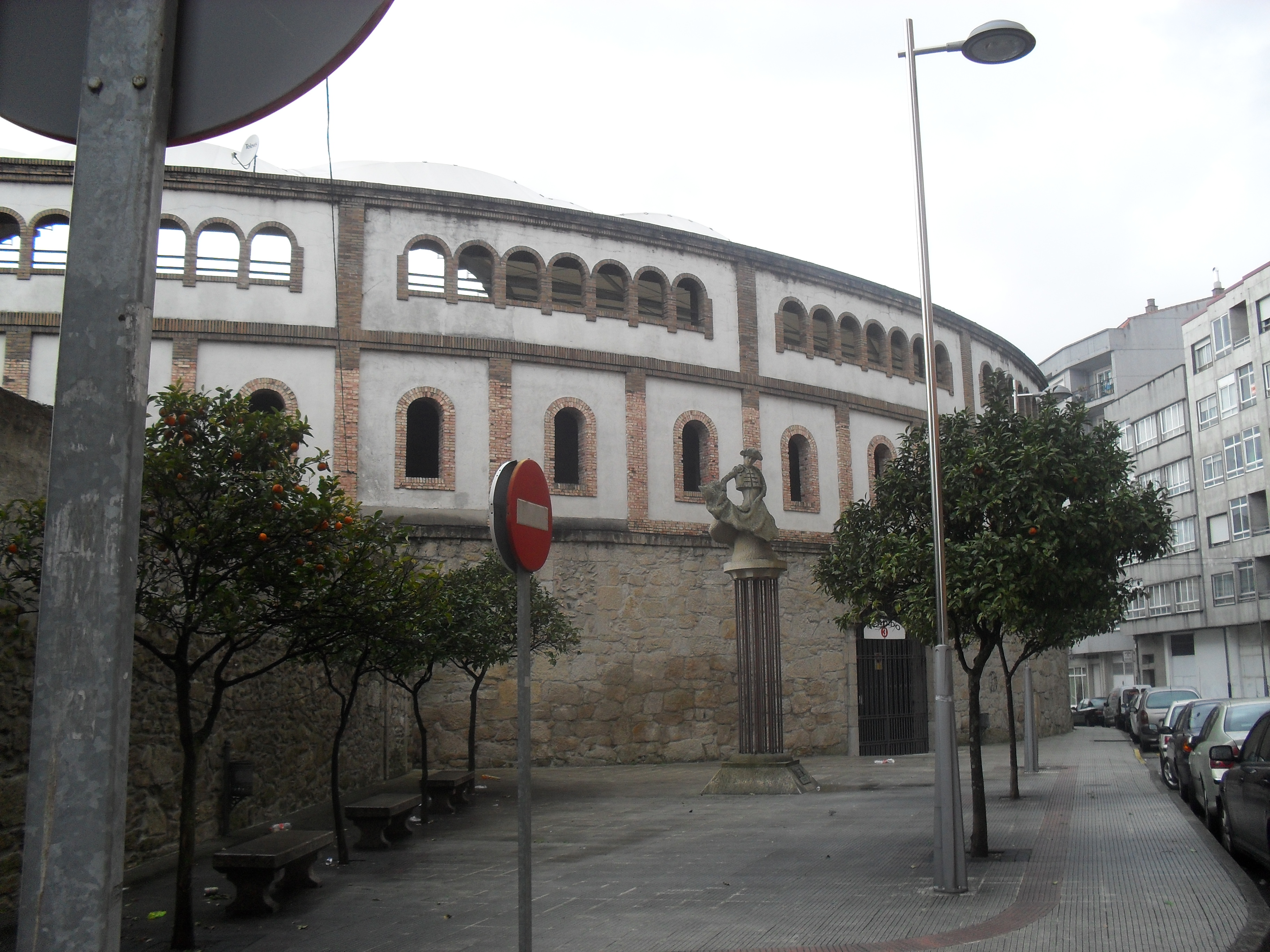

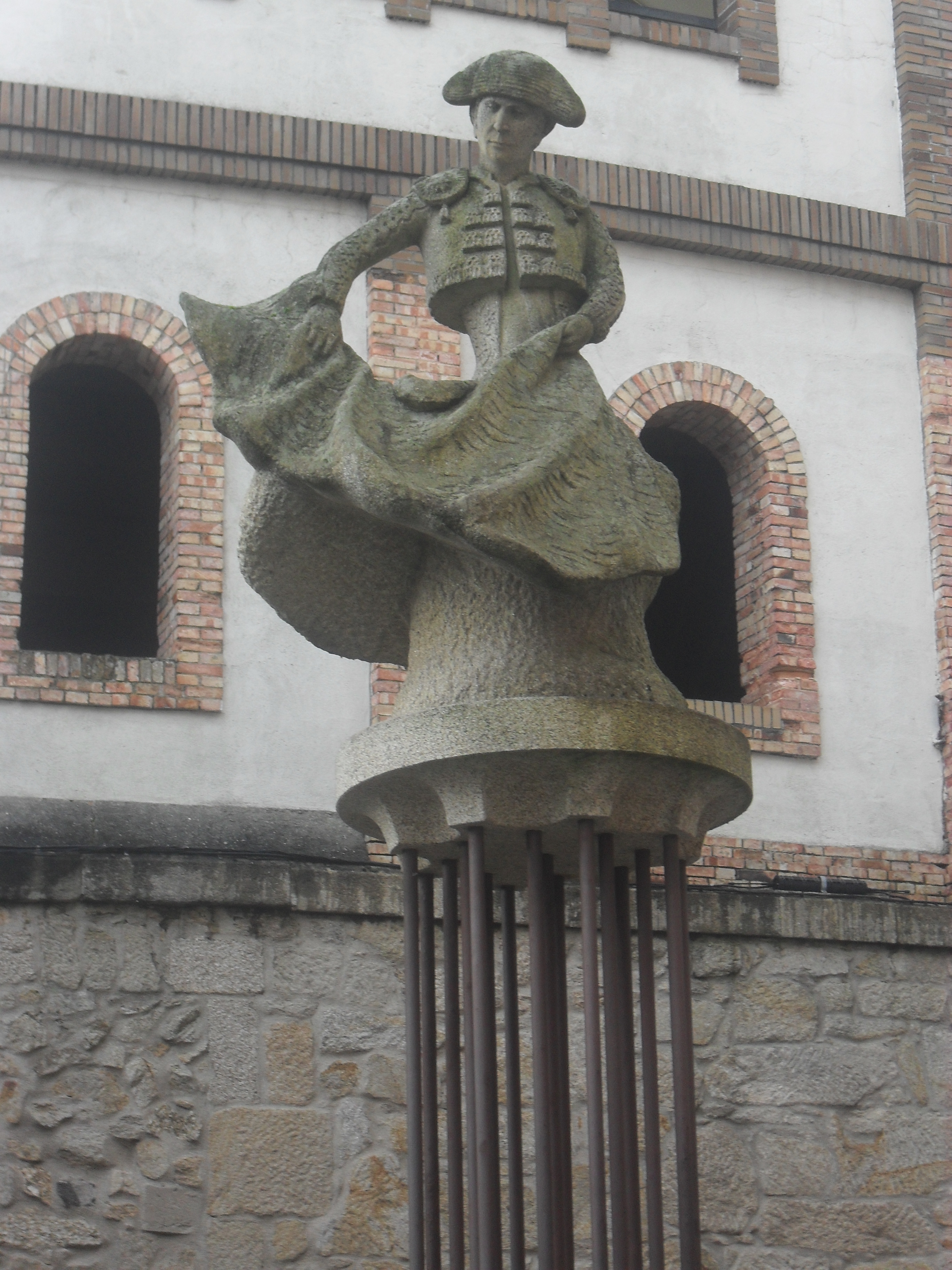

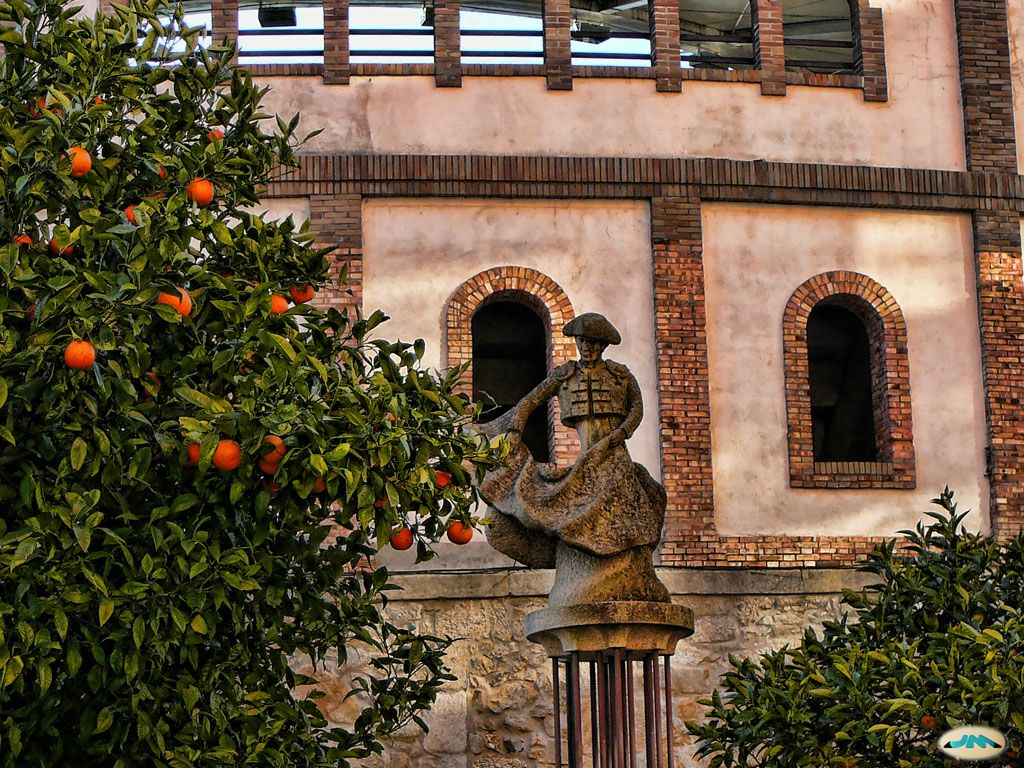

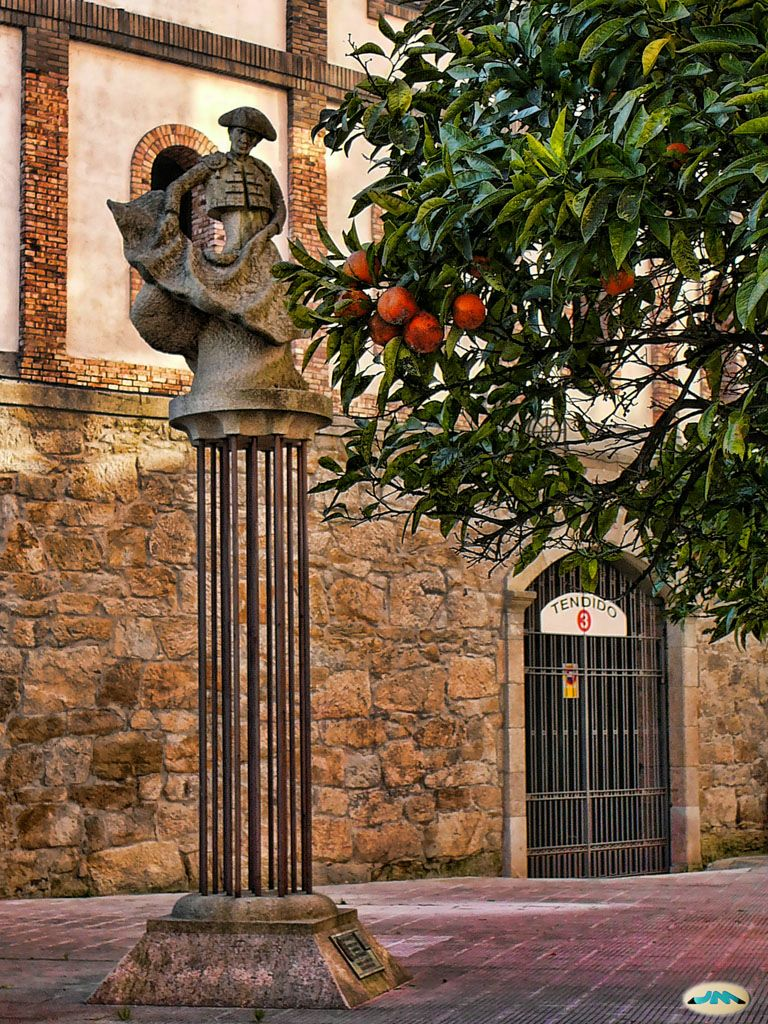

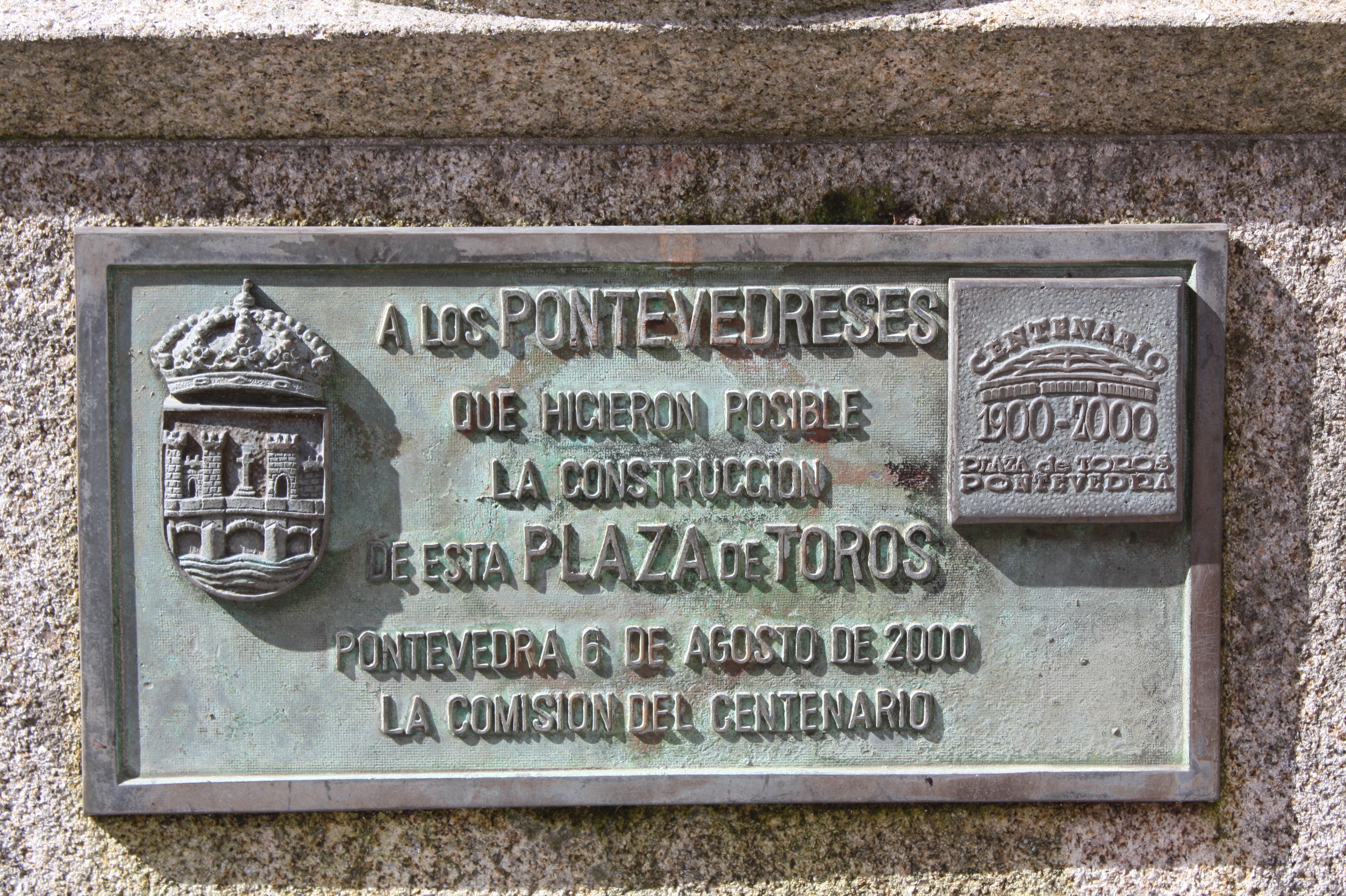

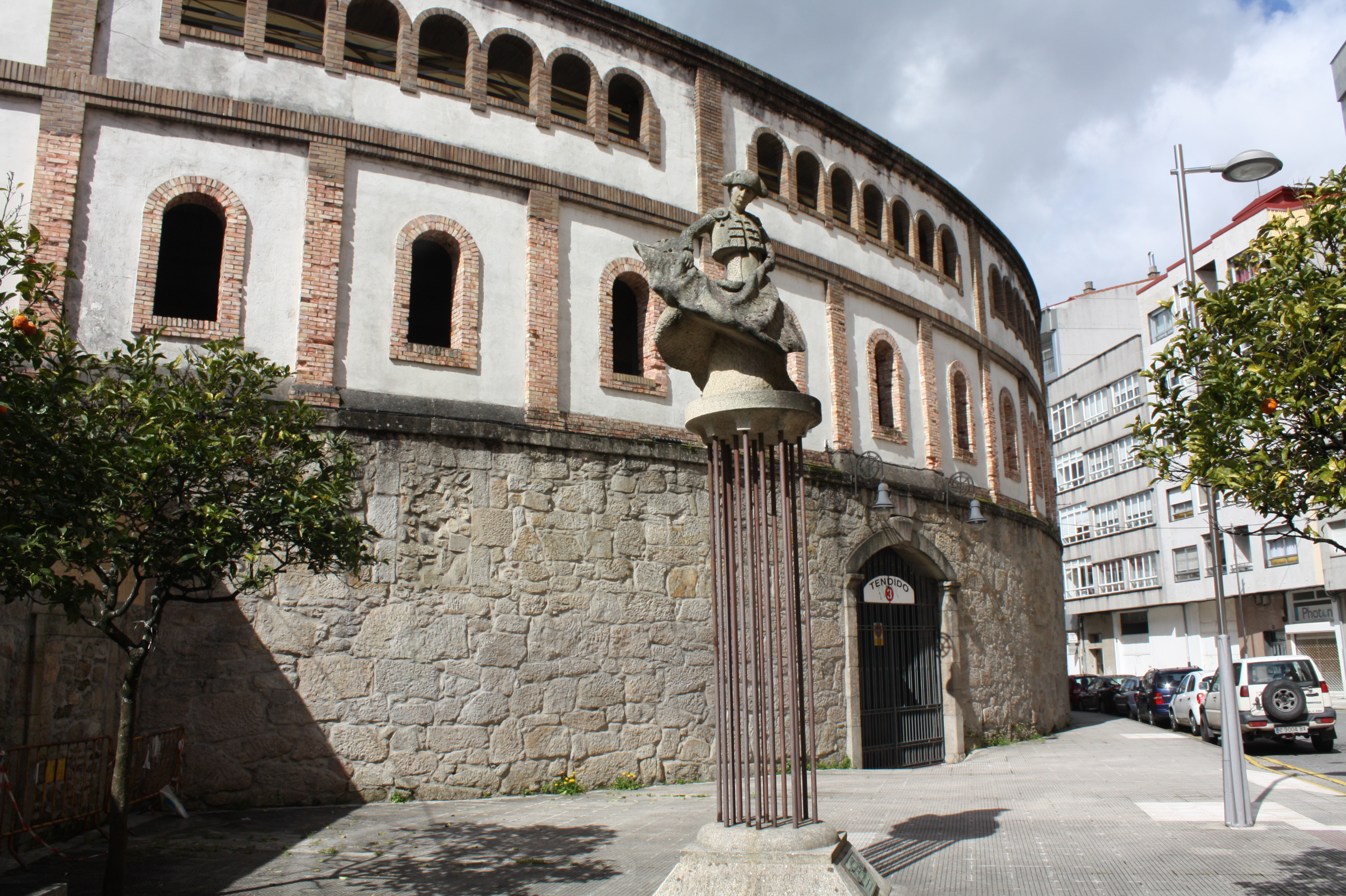

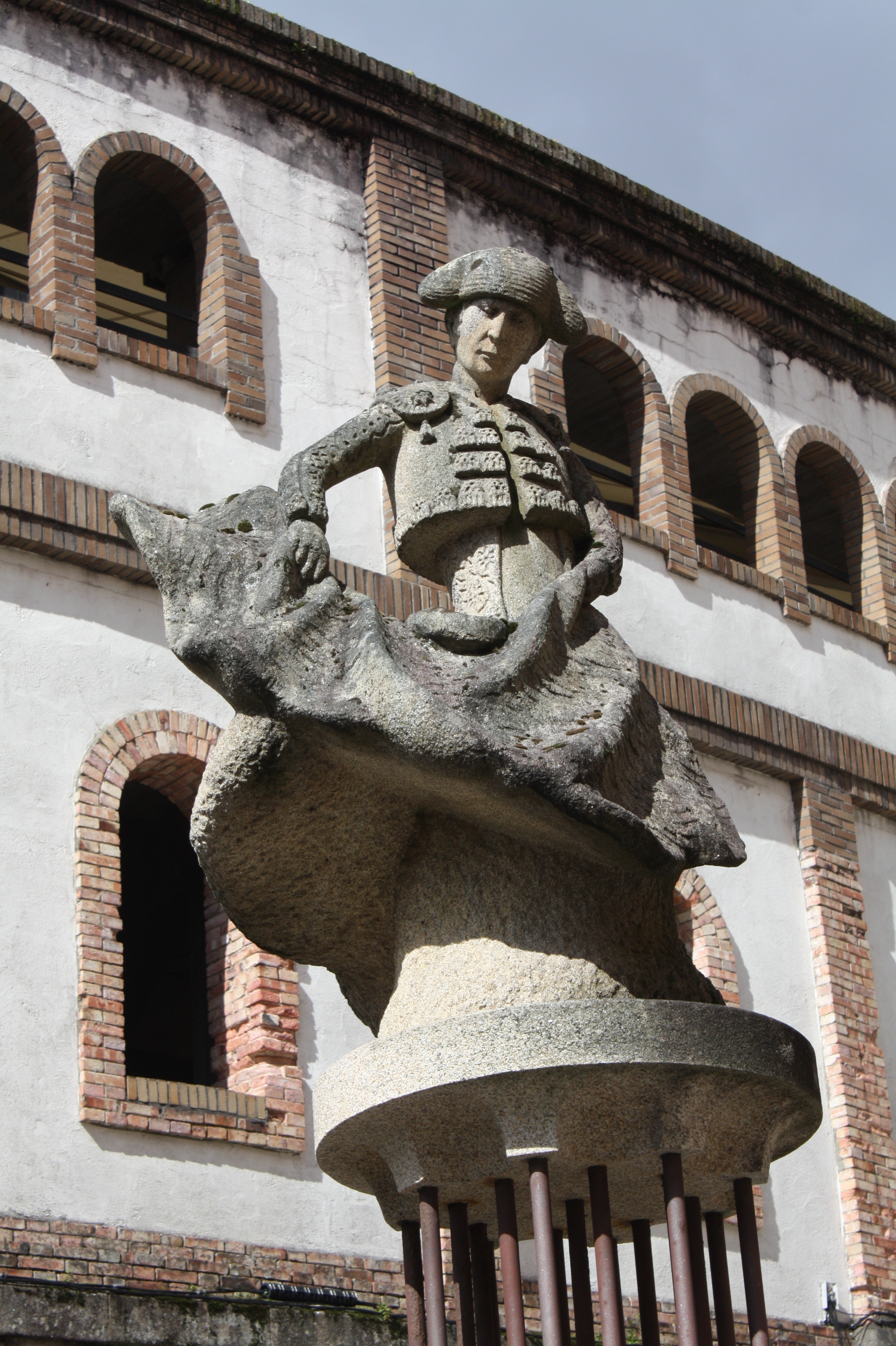

== See also ==
=== Bibliography ===
- Fontoira Surís, Rafael (2009). Pontevedra monumental (in Spanish). Pontevedra: Diputación Provincial de Pontevedra. p. 421. ISBN 978-84-8457-327-2.

=== Related Articles ===
- Bullfighting
- Pontevedra
- Bullring

=== External links ===
- Rias Baixas Tourism
- Structurae
