= Chapel of Saint Roch (Pontevedra) =

Baroque chapel in Pontevedra, Spain

Saint Roch Chapel
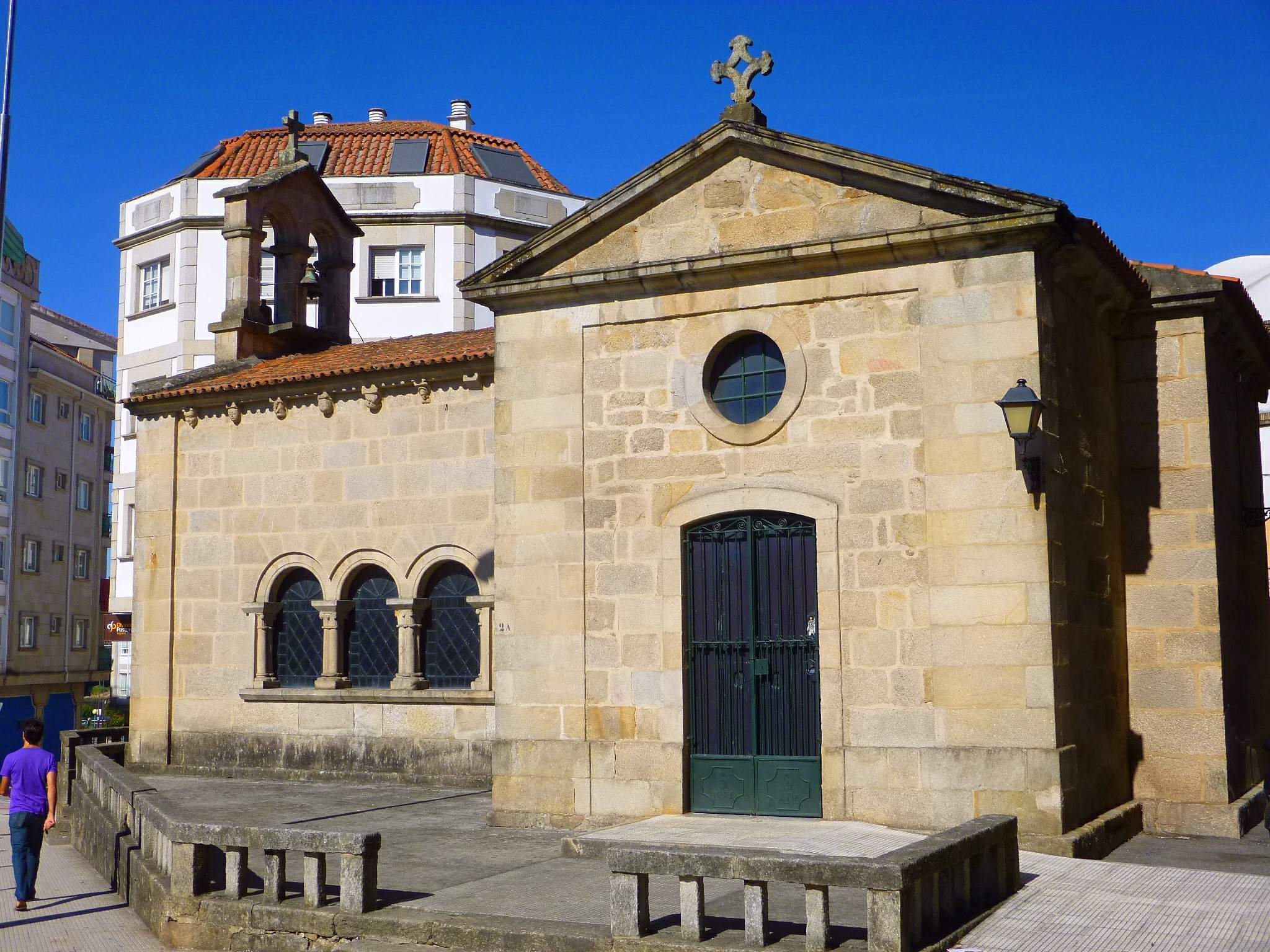
- East facade of the chapel
- Saint Roch Chapel
- 42°25′47″N 8°39′04″W
- Location: Pontevedra, Spain
- Country: Spain
- Denomination: Catholicism

Architecture
- Groundbreaking: 1861
- Completed: 1901

Administration
- Diocese: Roman Catholic Archdiocese of Santiago de Compostela

Saint Roch's Chapel is a Catholic religious building located in the neighbourhood of A Moureira in the city of Pontevedra, Spain. It is located in San Roque Street, very close to the port of Corvaceiras.

== History ==
It was the first Dominican church in the city. In the Middle Ages, the inhabitants of Pontevedra had already built a chapel in the lower course of the Gafos river to seek refuge and protection from Saint Roch, close to the old hospital of Saint Lazarus, which housed the infectious patients.

The chapel was originally erected in the Corvaceiras area, near the port, as a symbol of protection against plague that might arrive from overseas. Over time, the chapel was moved several times, until it was installed in its current location in 1861. In 1901, the chapel was renovated and extended from a single nave to a transept. In October 1956, a further extension of the chapel was planned with the construction of a new transverse volume, and the result of this remodelling was inaugurated on 16 August 1962.

On 11 August 2017, St Roch's Chapel inaugurated new bells, a faithful copy of the previous ones dating from 1871.

== Description ==
It is a Neoclassical chapel with Romanesque additions, square floor plan and with a single nave. Some of the Romanesque remains, such as the columns joined four by four to form three large windows, belong to the church of the former monastery of Casteláns, in the municipality of Covelo, whose stones, when demolished, were distributed to different places in the province of Pontevedra.

On the east side façade, there are small columns joined in groups of four to form windows, and on the side façades and the chevet, Romanesque corbels, some of which have been added to imitate the old ones. The motifs of the corbels are varied: nacelles, monstrous heads, bearded figures, vegetal and geometric decoration, scallop shells and figures of animals such as bears and toads.

The bell tower stands out on the main façade. On one side, the image of Saint Roch is visible. The entrance doors to the chapel are crowned by segmental arches. The east façade portal has a large oculus above the door and ends in a triangular pediment. The chapel is surrounded by a simple stone wall which serves as a small parvise.

The interior of the chapel is dominated by the polychrome wooden high altar. On the upper part there is a medallion with the inscription "Ave María Purísima". In a niche in the centre is the image of Saint Roch, on the right the Sacred Heart of Jesus and the Queen of Peace with a dove in her right hand, and on the left Our Lady of the Rosary and Saint Peter.

In the arms of the transept, on the side altars, on the right, is Saint Telmo. On the left are Our Lady of Sorrows, Our Lady of Mount Carmel and Saint Sebastian, to whom the city has paid homage every 20 January since 1515, during the Vow of the City, for having rid it of the plague. The whole chapel has white ceilings like many Portuguese churches.

== Culture ==
The image of Saint Roch takes part in the Corpus Christi procession and goes through the fishermen's quarter, to which it gives its name, during the procession on 16 August.

== Gallery ==
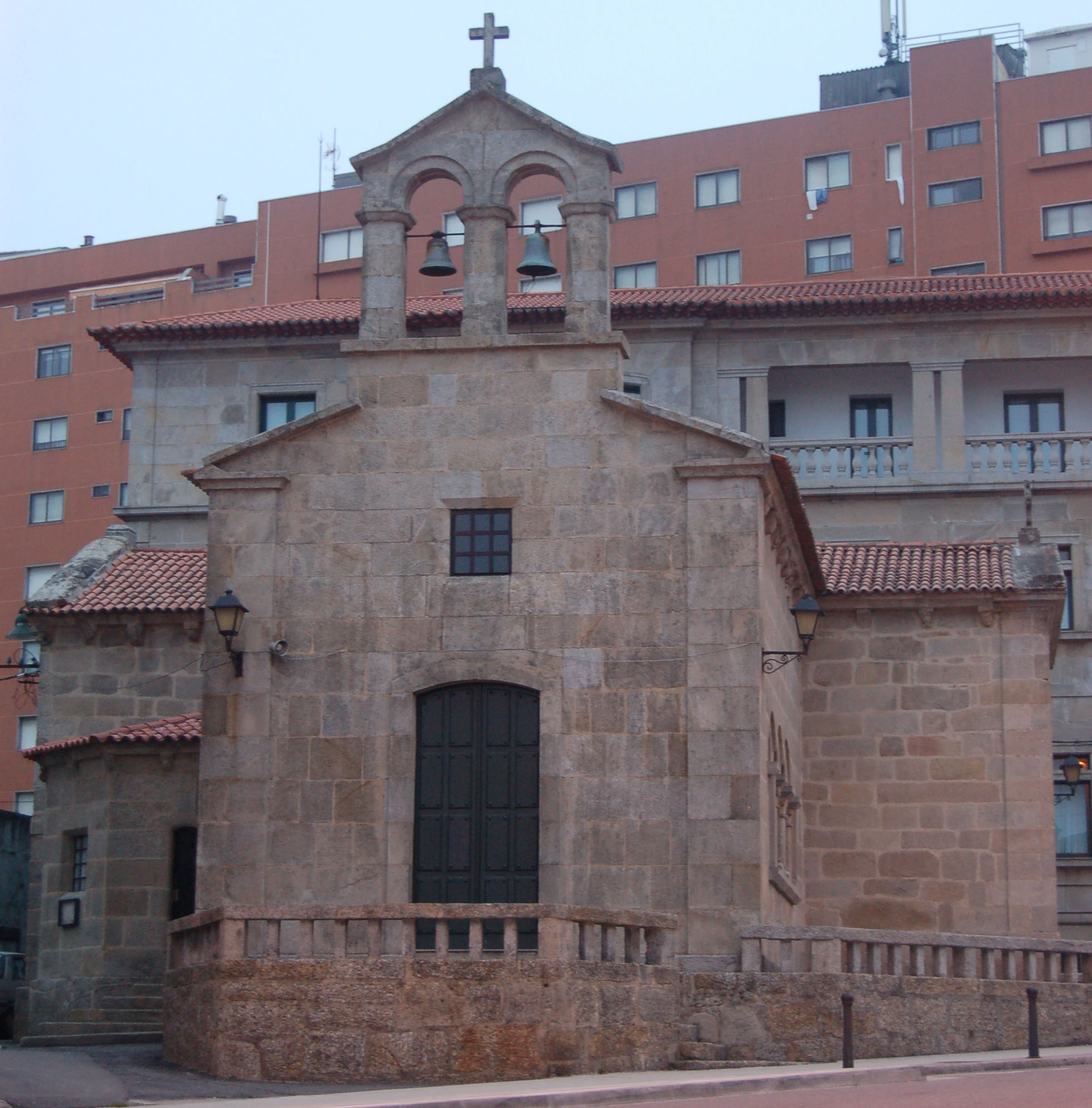
Main facade and bell tower

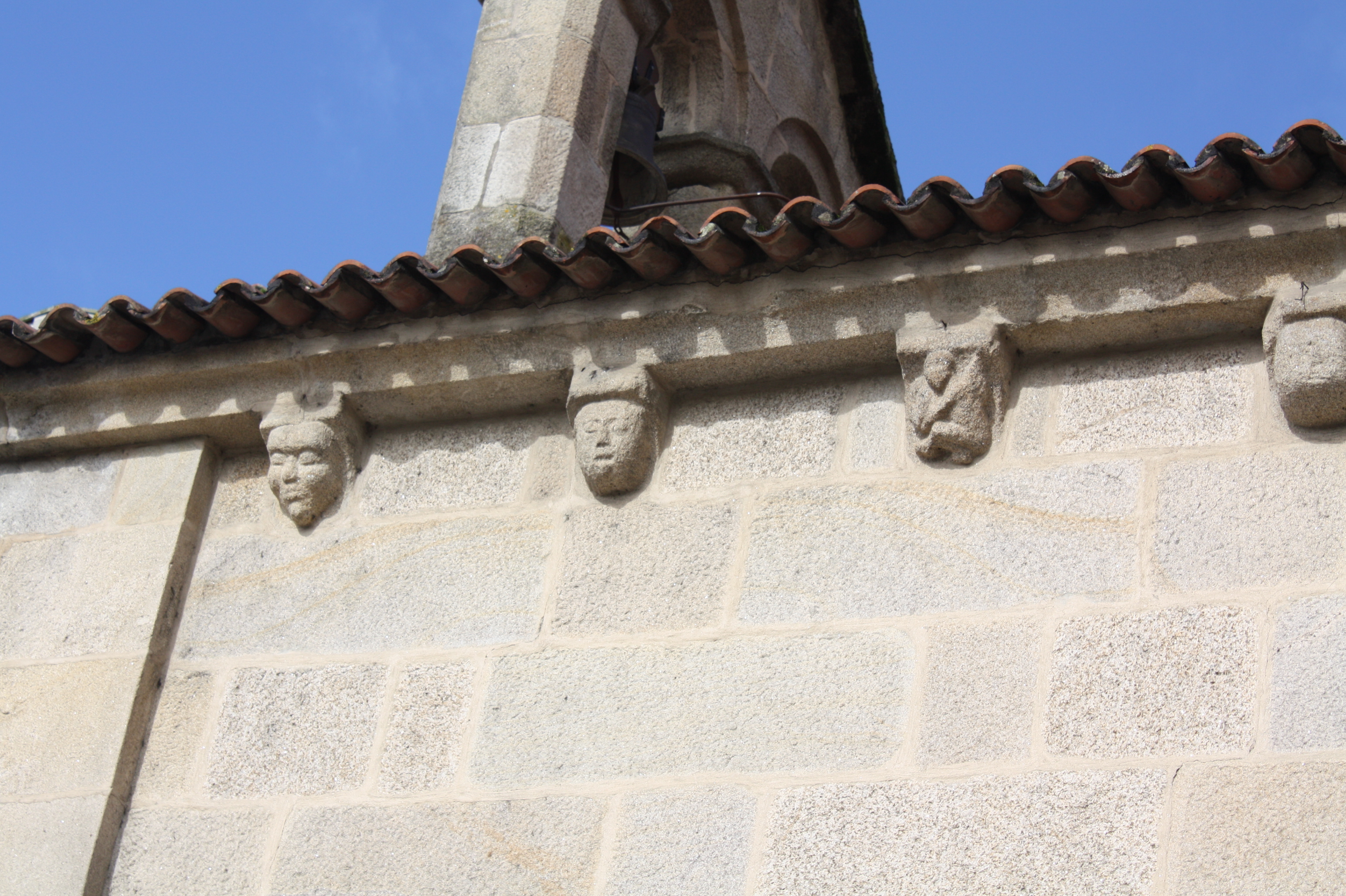
Romanesque corbels

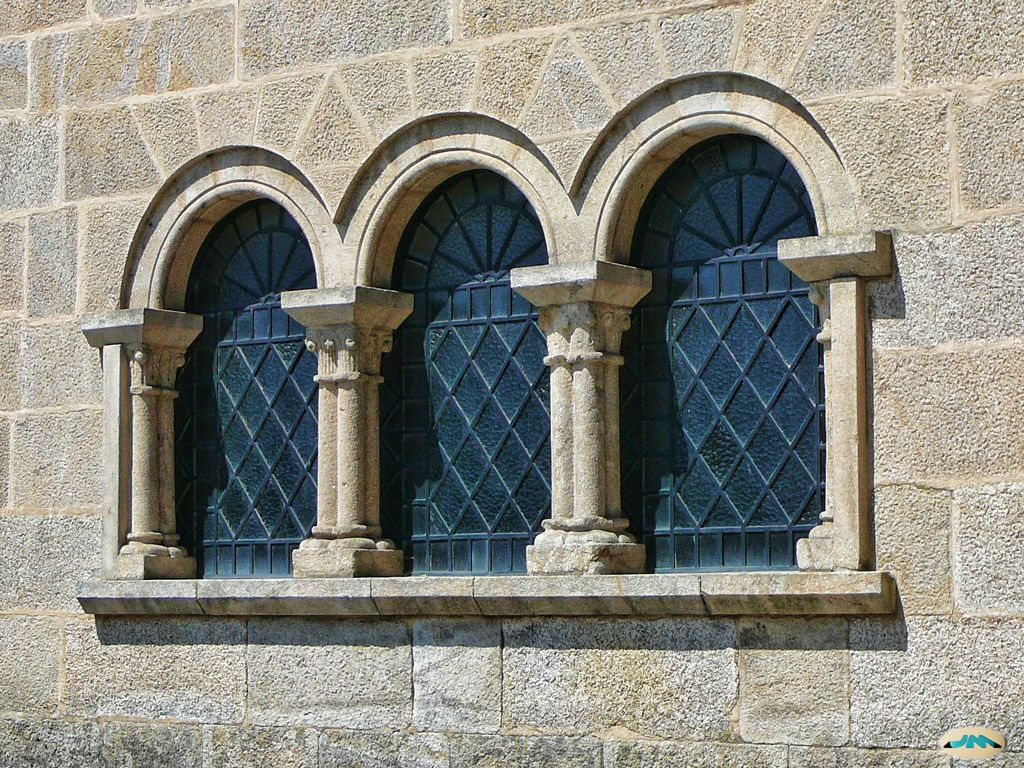
Romanesque arches and columns on the side façade

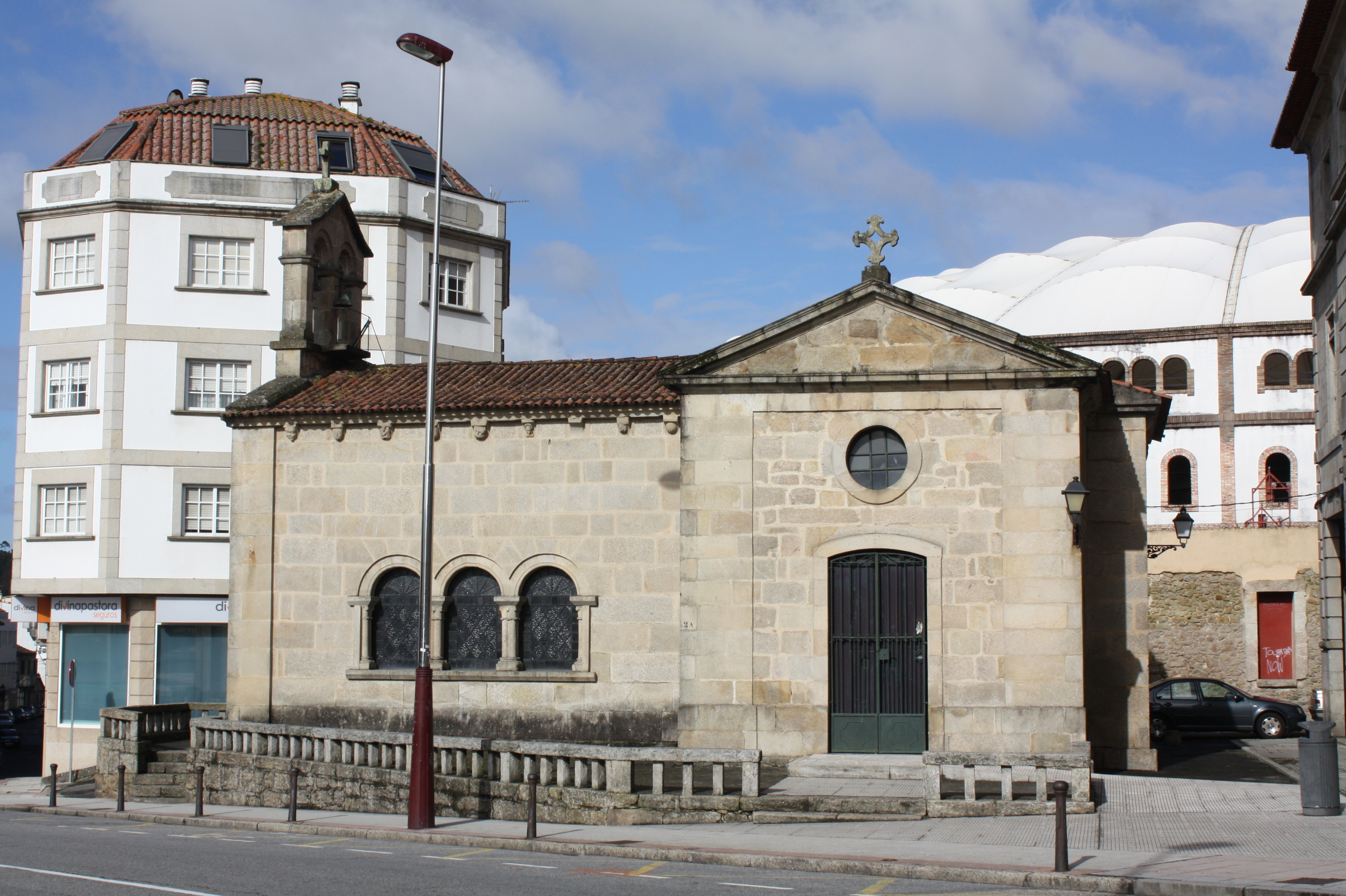
Side facade

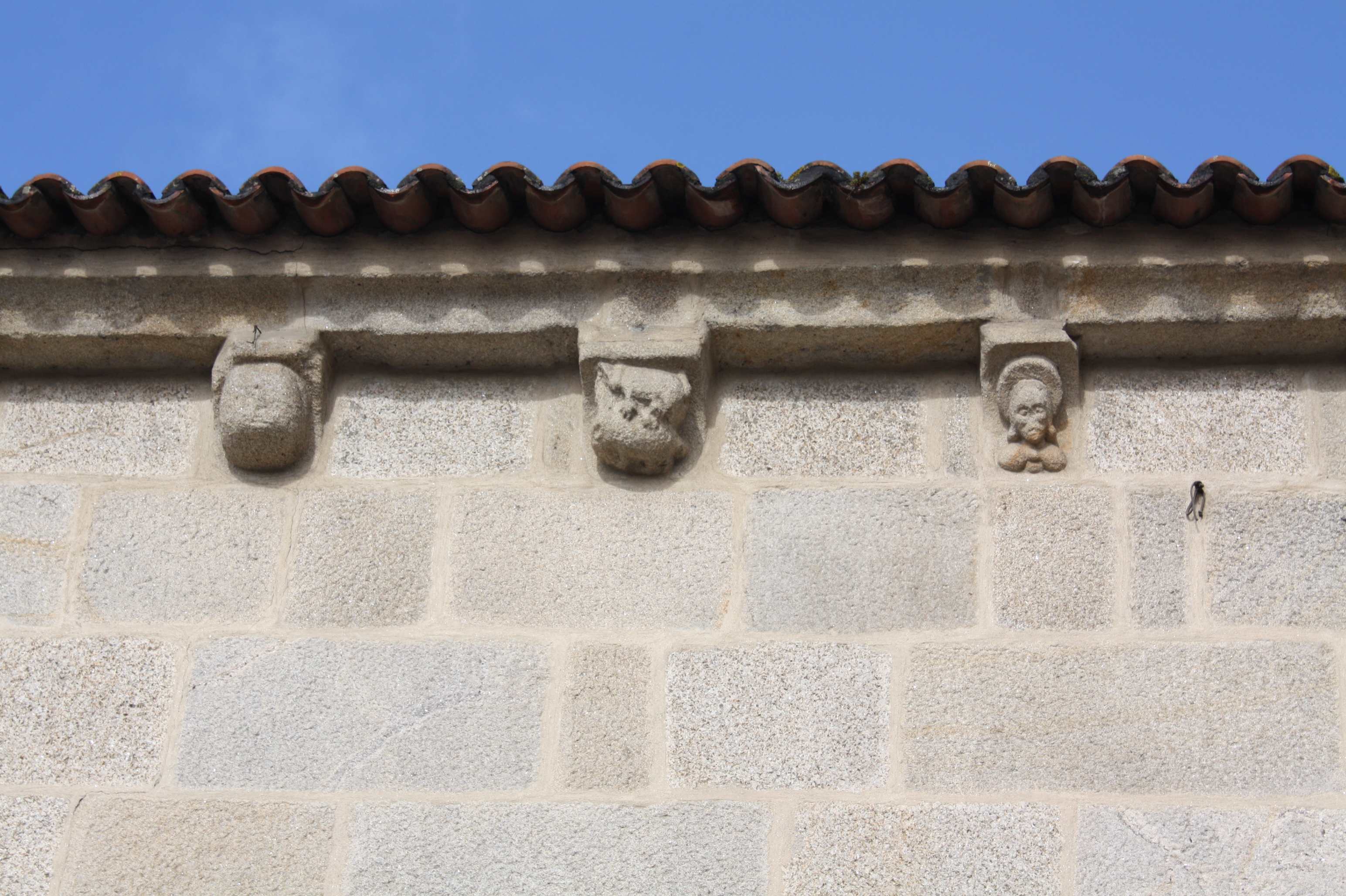
Romanesque corbels

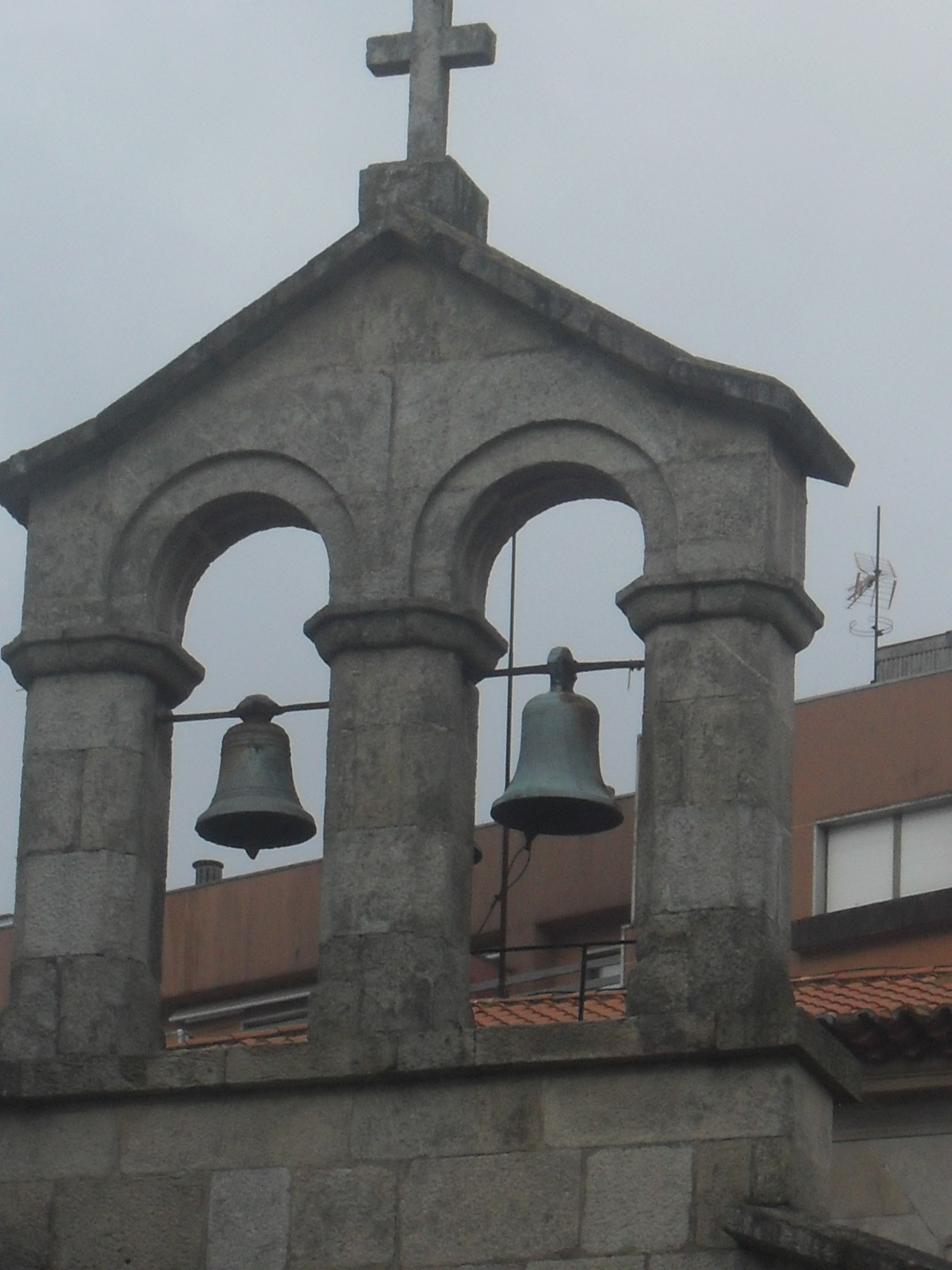
Bell tower of the chapel

== See also ==
=== Bibliography ===
- Aganzo, Carlos (2010). Pontevedra. Ciudades con encanto (in Spanish). Madrid: El País-Aguilar. pp. 89–90. ISBN 978-84-03-50934-4.
- Fontoira Surís, Rafael (2009). Pontevedra monumental (in Galician). Pontevedra: Diputación de Pontevedra. pp. 457–458. ISBN 978-84-8457-327-2.
- Riveiro Tobío, Elvira (2008). Descubrir Pontevedra (in Spanish). Pontevedra: Edicións do Cumio. p. 59. ISBN 9788482890852.

=== Related articles ===
- Neoclassicism
- Saint Roch
- A Moureira (Pontevedra)

=== External links ===
- Saint Roch's chapel on the Galicia Tourism website
- Saint Roch's chapel on the Rías Baixas Tourism website
