= A Moureira (Pontevedra) =

Neighbourhood in Pontevedra, Spain

- Neighbourhood
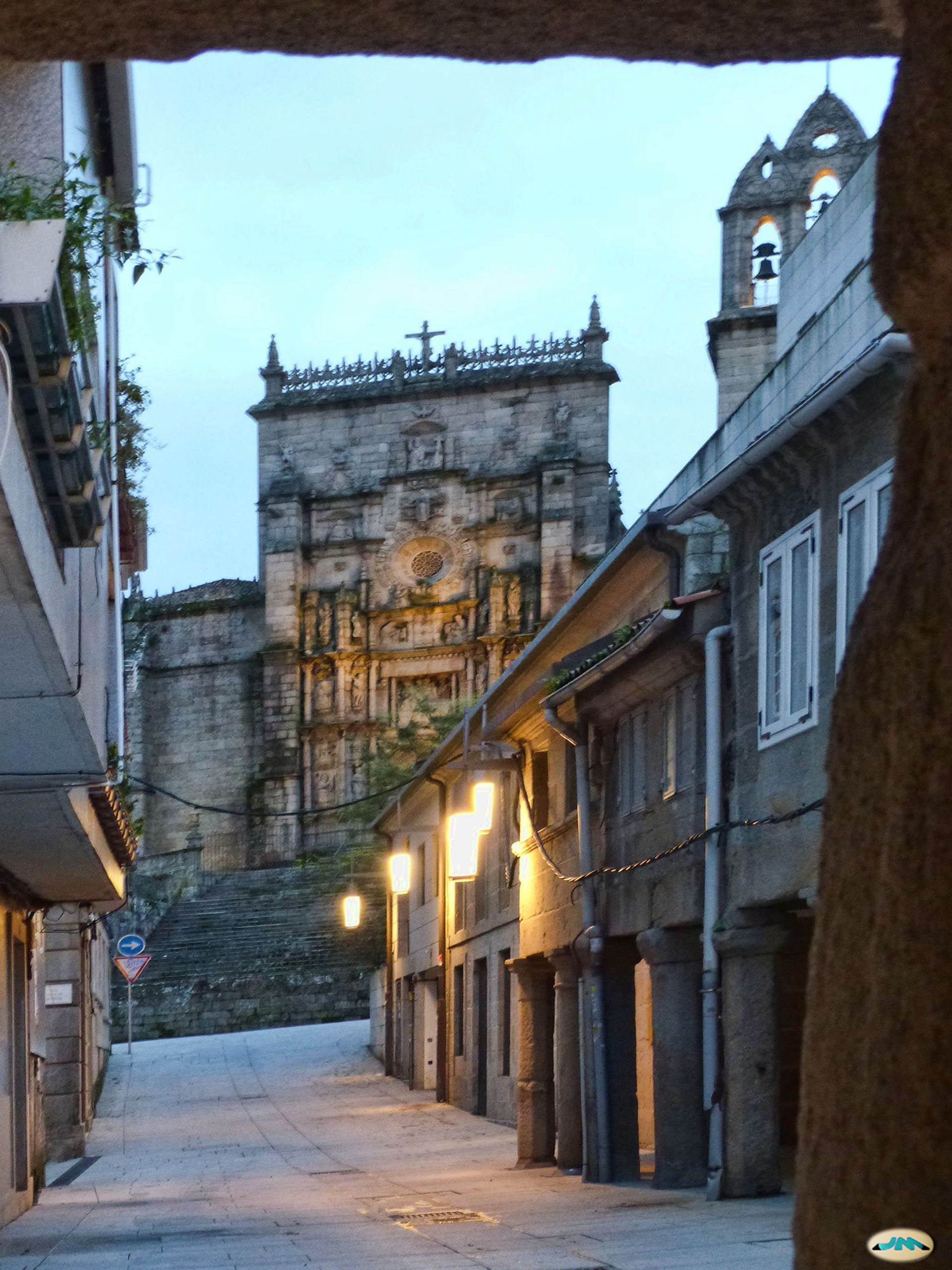
- Xan Guillermo Street in Moureira de Arriba
- Interactive map of A Moureira
- Coordinates: 42°25′46.0″N 8°39′12.0″W
- Country: Spain
- City: Pontevedra
- Postal code: 36002

A Moureira is the old seafarers' and fishermen's quarter of the city of Pontevedra (Spain), where the Seamen's Guild lived, near the Lérez river, the Pontevedra ria and the Gafos river. Nowadays, it is part of the city centre.

== Location ==
The ancient maritime suburb of A Moureira was located outside the city walls, between the walled town and the coastline, and extended in an arc along the coastline from the Burgo bridge to the mouth of the Gafos river.

At present, it corresponds to the vast urban spaces bordering the west of the city, such as the Teucer Estate, and the surroundings of Xan Guillermo, Fonte da Moureira, Campo do Boi and Benito Soto streets and Cornielles de Holanda Square, and Barca Street further north; and Monteleón Street, Almirantes Matos Street, Juan Villaverde Barcala Street, Hermanos Nodales Street, San Roque de Abaixo Street, Ribeira dos Peiraos Street and Campo da Torre and Gremio de Mareantes squares to the south.

== History ==
A Moureira was created as a maritime suburb where the guild of sailors of the city lived. The name comes from moira, from the Latin muria, the brine, sale muria used in the salting of sardines, salt being an essential product for the preservation of fish. During the Middle Ages and most of the early modern period, the port of Pontevedra was the most important in the Rías Baixas. During this period, the city was granted several royal privileges. In 1229, Alfonso IX of León granted it an exclusive privilege for the production and distribution of fish throughout the kingdom, and in 1238, Ferdinand III of Castile granted it the manufacture of fish fat. In 1452, John II of Castile granted Pontevedra the title of loading and unloading port of Galicia, located on the three large quays of the Moureira de Arriba, where goods from Galicia were loaded and unloaded. In the 15th century, the Santa María caravel, known as La Gallega, was built in the shipyards of Pontevedra. It took Christopher Columbus to the discovery of America in 1492.

The A Moureira neighbourhood reached its peak in the 16th century, associated with the art of salting and the export of fish. The neighbourhood housed the facilities necessary for the development of maritime and port activities, as well as the accommodation of sailors and fishermen. During this century, the large volume of sardines caught in the ria of Pontevedra and the ease with which they could be dried and salted in the neighbourhood made Pontevedra one of the busiest and richest ports in the Iberian Peninsula, where ships from all over Europe called in. In 1517, as a symbol of the city's splendour, under the auspices of the Seamen's Guild, the construction of the Basilica of Saint Mary Major began, its facade being one of the first things that the sailors saw of Pontevedra when they arrived from fishing at sea.

From the quays of A Moureira, ships left for the most important commercial enclaves such as England or Flanders, and in the streets of the town in the 16th century, the urban atmosphere was distinctly cosmopolitan, with citizens as diverse as Bretons, Flemings and Portuguese. In 1557, the town ordinances forbade residence in the A Moureira quarter to residents who did not have a trade directly related to the sea.

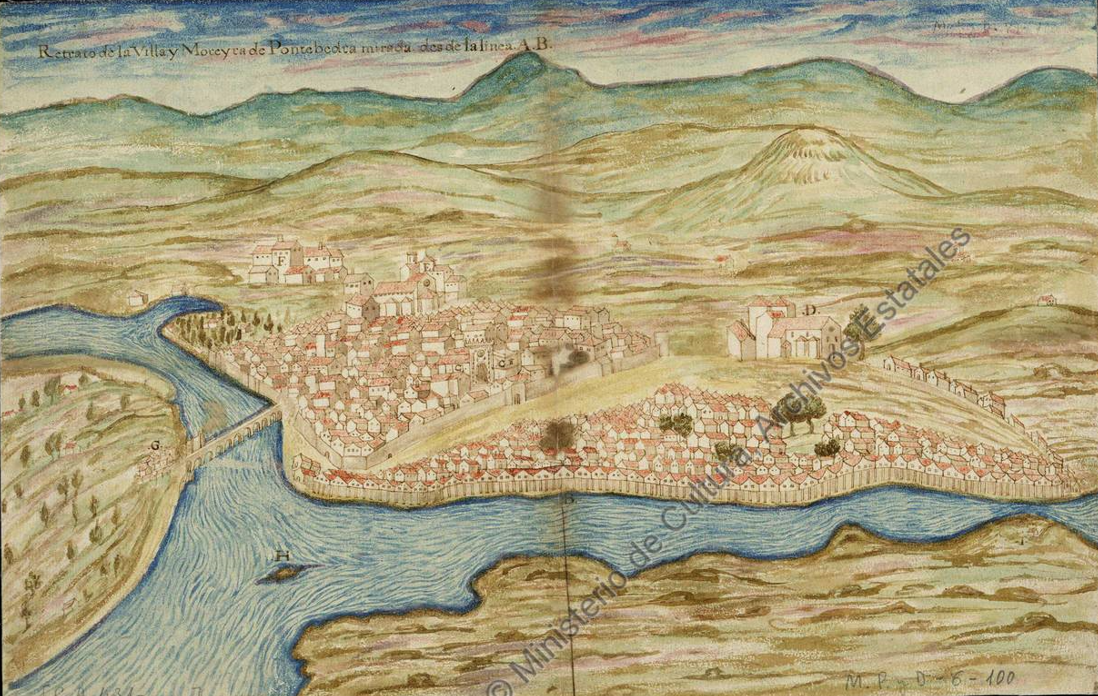
Portrait of Pontevedra and A Moureira in 1595

In 1835, there were still 17 of these stone quays in A Moureira. The great modification of the coastline of Pontevedra, where the old quays of A Moureira were located, began in 1900, making them disappear, with the construction of a dyke in 1905 and embankments from 1910 onwards from the Burgo bridge to the Barca bridge and then to the mouth of the Gafos river. It was here that the new dock of the port of Corvaceiras was created in the early 1910s and the Gremio de Mareantes Square was built on land reclaimed from the estuary, which until then had not been dry land. The embankments led to the development of the present Corvaceiras Avenue in the 1960s, which eventually served as the city's ring road, near the ria and the river. After the housing boom of the 1960s, most of the traditional houses in Moureiras were replaced by modern buildings. In 1989, work was undertaken to transform the river bank into a four-lane avenue, and in the 1990s large buildings replaced the few remaining traditional houses.

== Description ==
The old A Moureira neighbourhood was divided into three parts corresponding to three Moureiras: the Moureira de Arriba, the Moureira da Barca and the Moureira de Abaixo.

- In the Moureira de Arriba was the goods port area from where ships loaded with Ribeiro wine, salted fish or iron tools left. The ships docked in this area in the large estuary of the Rons River. It extended from the vicinity of the Burgo bridge to the vicinity of the Barca bridge, where the shipyards and workshops related to the sea were located. The salted fish of the fishermen and other Galician products such as Ribeiro wine or wood were distributed to other countries such as England or Flanders.

In Xan Guillermo Street, the main street that connects the Moureira de Arriba to the walled city, there are still houses from the 16th century with Tuscan columns.

In the Plaza del Muelle, on the northern bank of the historic centre of Pontevedra, on the banks of the Moureira de Arriba, was one of the most important quays in the city. Today, the square is surrounded by orange trees and has a neoclassical stone fountain in its centre, crowned by the Greek goddess Pheme, designed by Alejandro Sesmero in 1876.

- The Moureira da Barca was located near the quay where the boat that connected with the other side of the ria was located, which later gave rise to the wooden bridge and the current Barca Bridge. It extended to the north side of the bullring, where the commercial activity took place. Most of the docks and shipyards were located there. In its shipyard, longer and heavier ships, such as galleys and caravels, were built. The calvary next to the Barca Bridge dates from the 16th century.
- The Moureira de Abaixo was a self-sufficient fishing village. It extended from the area around the Barca Bridge and the bullring to the mouth of the Gafos River. It was the location of the docks with fish salting factories, salt warehouses and a hospital for lepers. This Moureira was a fishing village, with houses dating back to the 15th and 16th centuries.

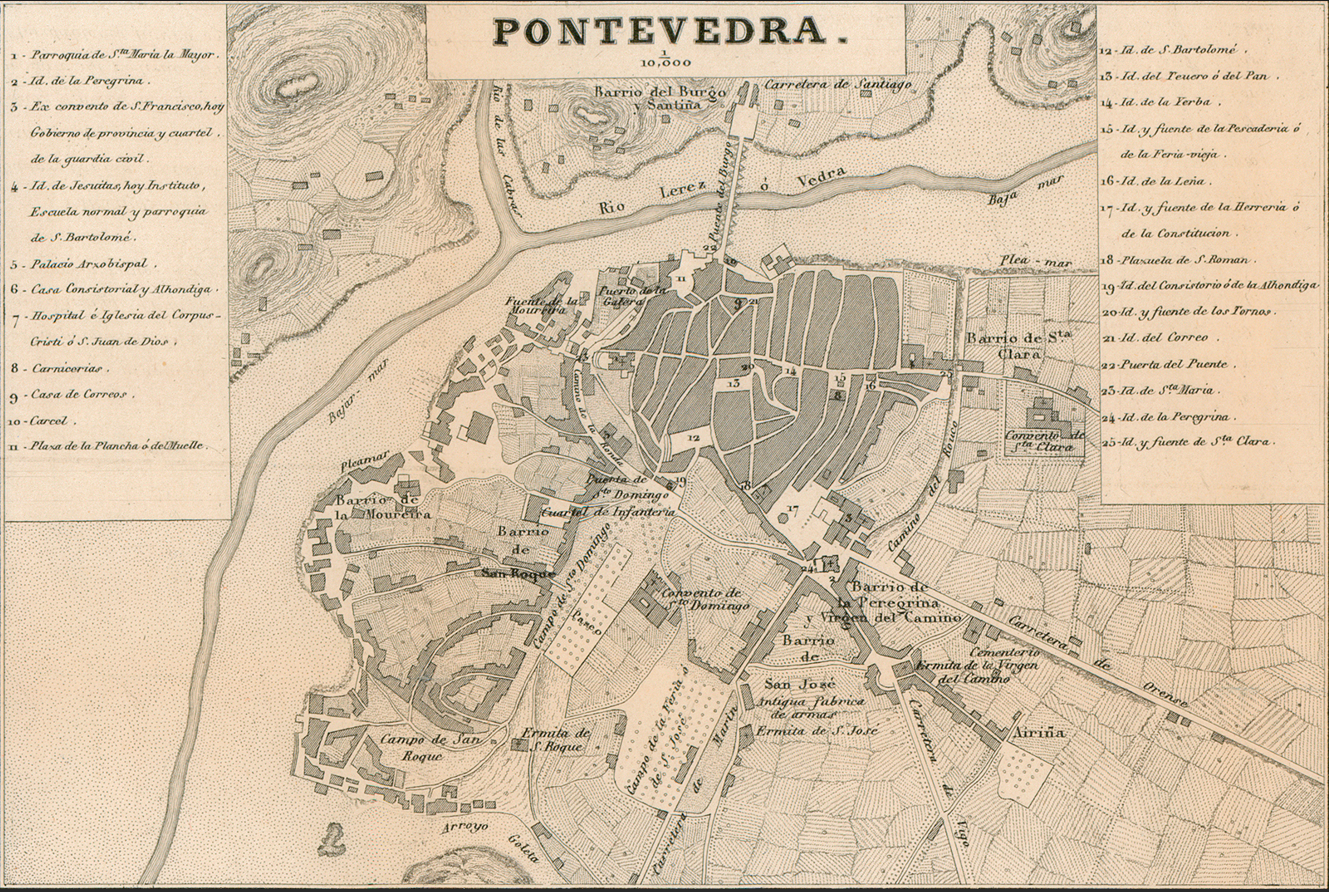
Map of Pontevedra in 1856 with the Moureira neighbourhood to the west of the town.

In A Moureira de Abaixo, the most typical street is Juan Villaverde Barcala Street. It has been preserved almost as it was two centuries ago, with typical houses and staircases cut into the rock.

In the Campo de la Torre, where the fishermen worked and where they repaired and dried the fishing equipment, since 1900 the Pontevedra bullring has been located and, a little further on, the chapel of Saint Roch, built in an area very close to the docks in honour of Saint Roch, the protector of the plague, to protect the inhabitants of the city from the deadly effects of the ships that arrived infected with the plague. It is neoclassical in style and Romanesque corbels have been added to its exterior. In Hermanos Nodales Street were some of the salt warehouses for the conservation of sardines. Also in A Moureira de Abaixo, in Ribeira dos Peiraos Street were the docks located at the mouth of the Gafos River. The old Saint Lazarus Hospital, dating from the 15th century, stands out in the street, with a small stone terrace at the end of the external staircase and high quadrangular pilasters. The building has witnessed the different epidemics that Pontevedra suffered until the 19th century.

The quays (peiraos) of the Moureiras consisted of a central stone staircase and two lateral platforms that protruded towards the water, facilitating the loading and unloading of boats, and each had its own name. The neighbourhood was made up of hundreds of small seafarers' houses of different types, former fishermen's residences, many with stone terraces at the end of an external staircase and their corresponding quays, others with attics and others finished in the shape of a mitre, which in the 15th century were known as outón houses. There were practically no streets in the traditional structure of the neighbourhood. All the paths that connected the quays, the houses and the fields were not paved. The occupation of the land was unaligned and scattered, except for the streets that connected with the path that surrounded the walls.

Some of the current names of the streets and alleys of the Moureiras are linked to the maritime architecture of the district, such as Plaza del Muelle, Xan Guillermo (owner of one of the Lérez docks), Sardina, Hermanos Nodales, Almirantes Matos, Milano de los Mares or Juan Villaverde Barcala (former president of the Sailors Guild).

== Gallery ==
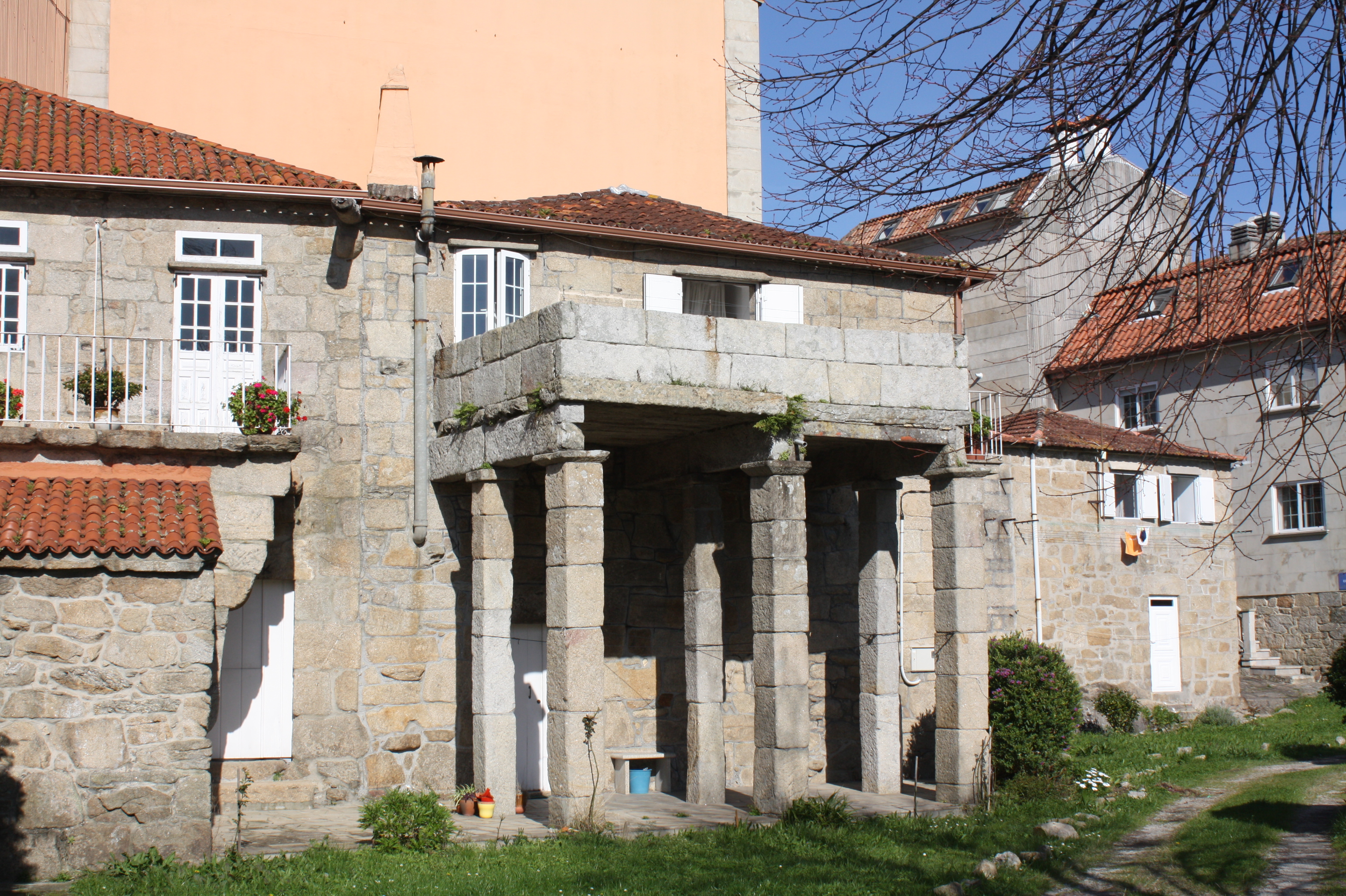
Old Saint Lazarus Hospital, Ribeira dos Peiraos Street

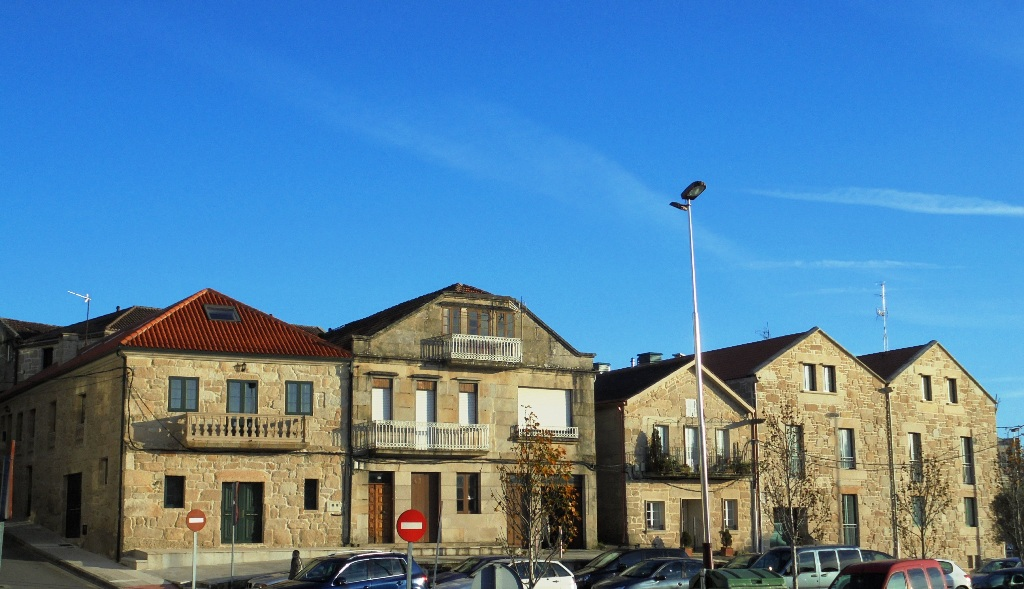
Old seafarers' houses in Moureira

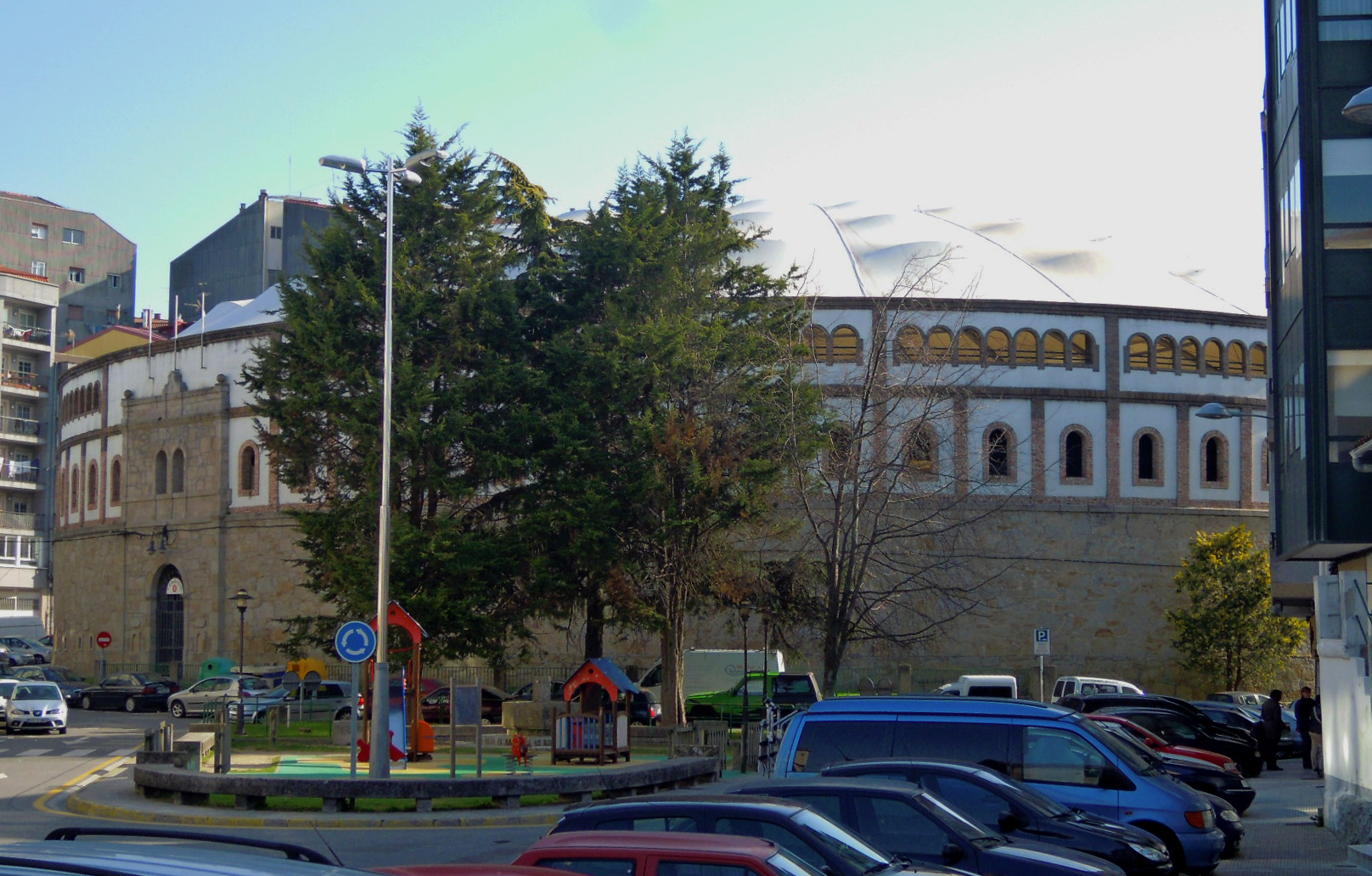
Campo da Torre square and bullring

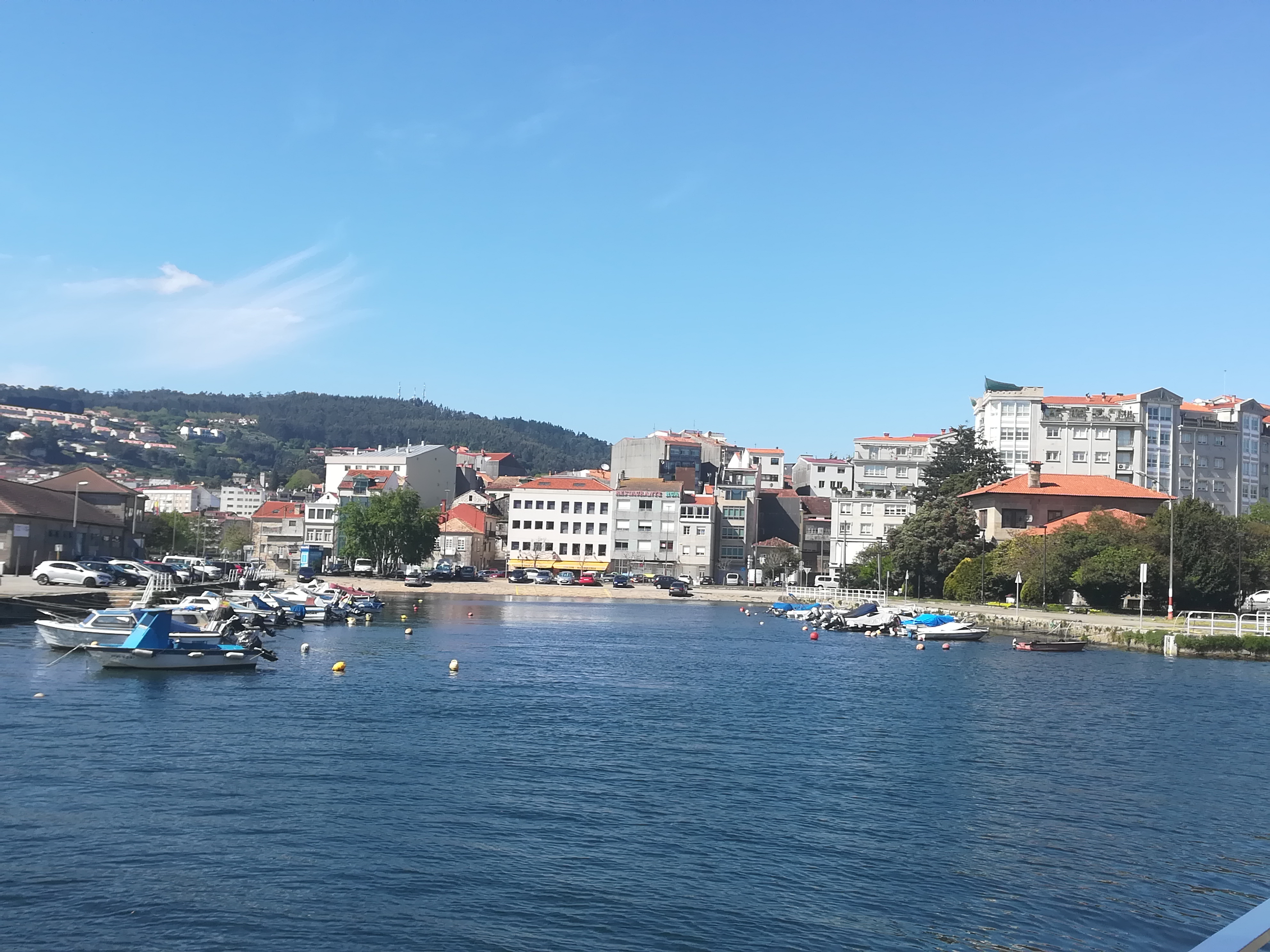
Corvaceiras port and Gremio de Mareantes square

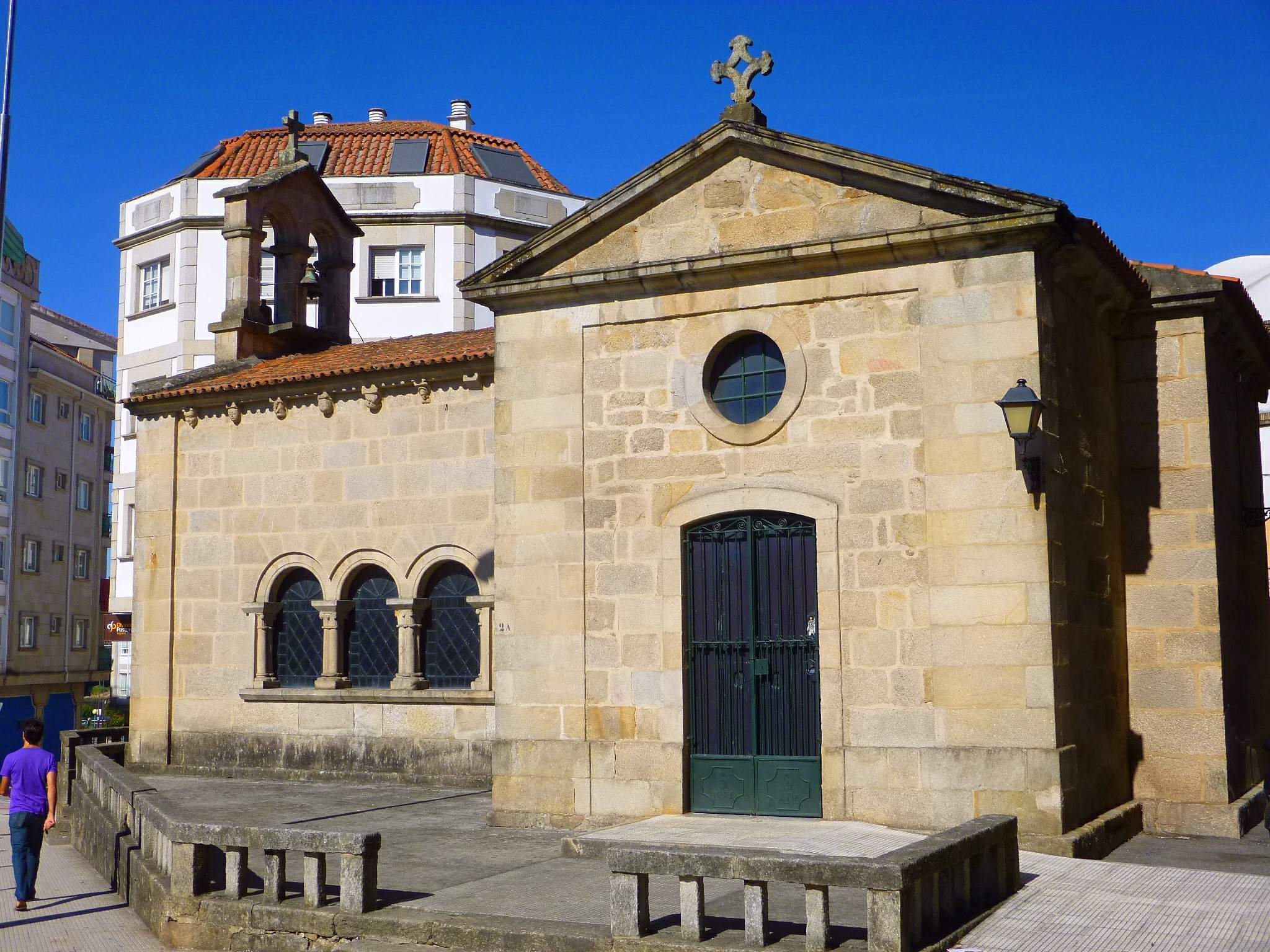
Saint Roch's chapel, side

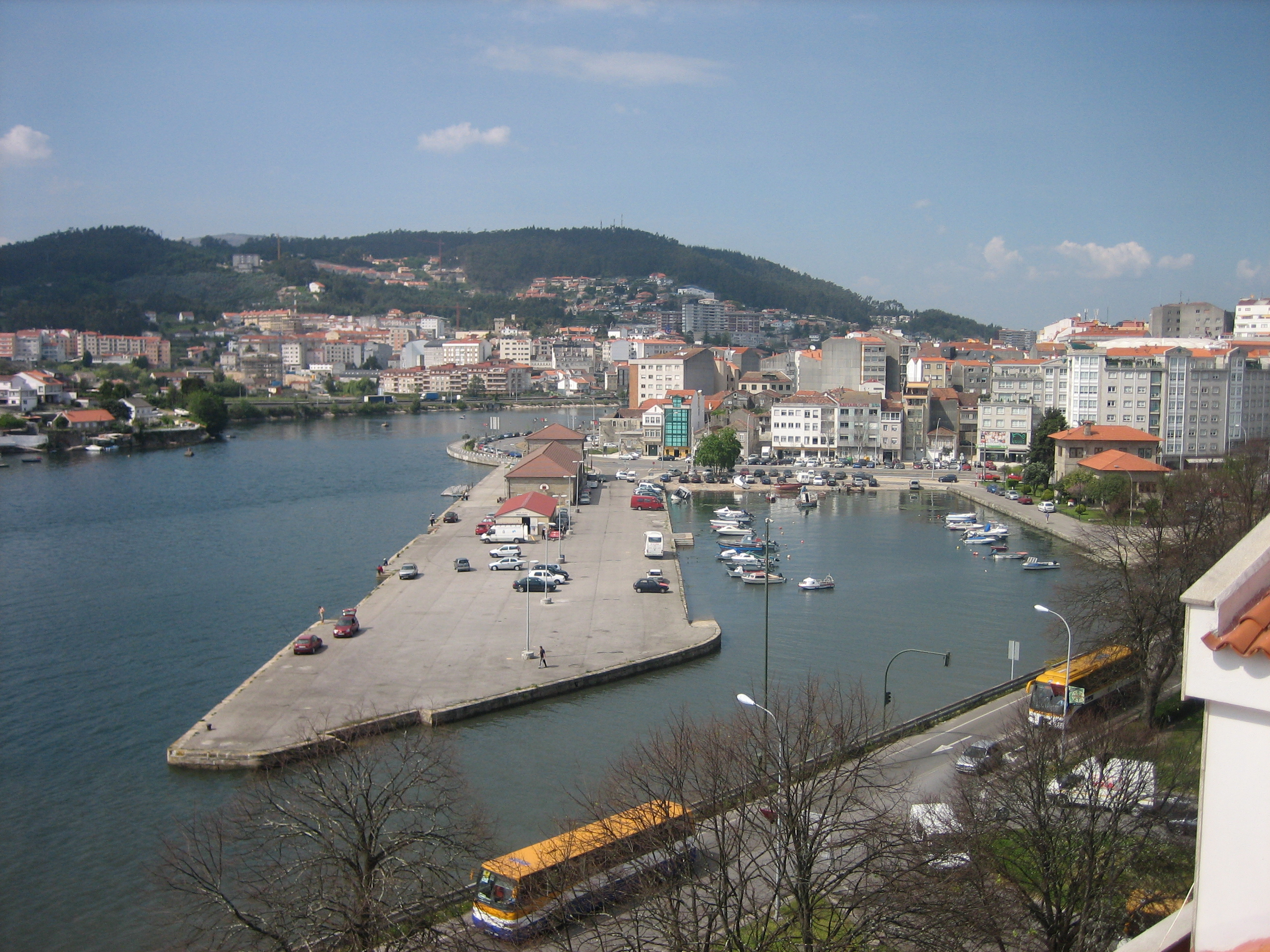
Current quay of Corvaceiras

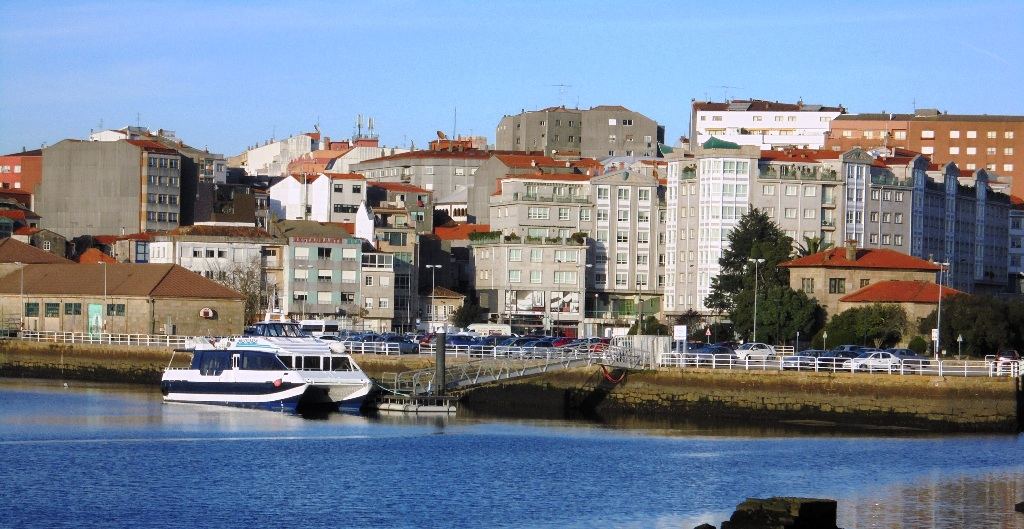
Stone building of the Seamen's Guild, right

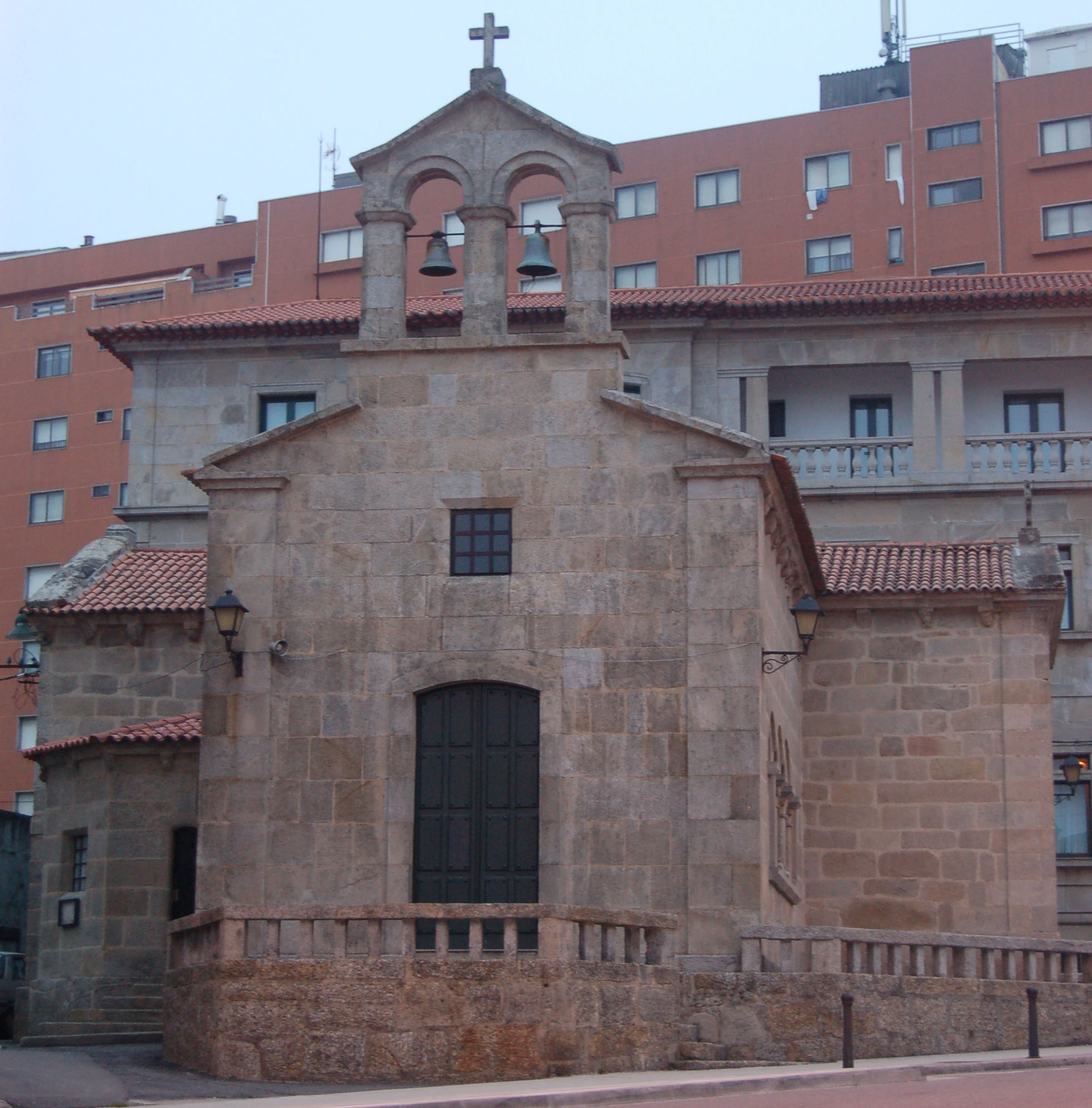
Saint Roch's chapel, front façade

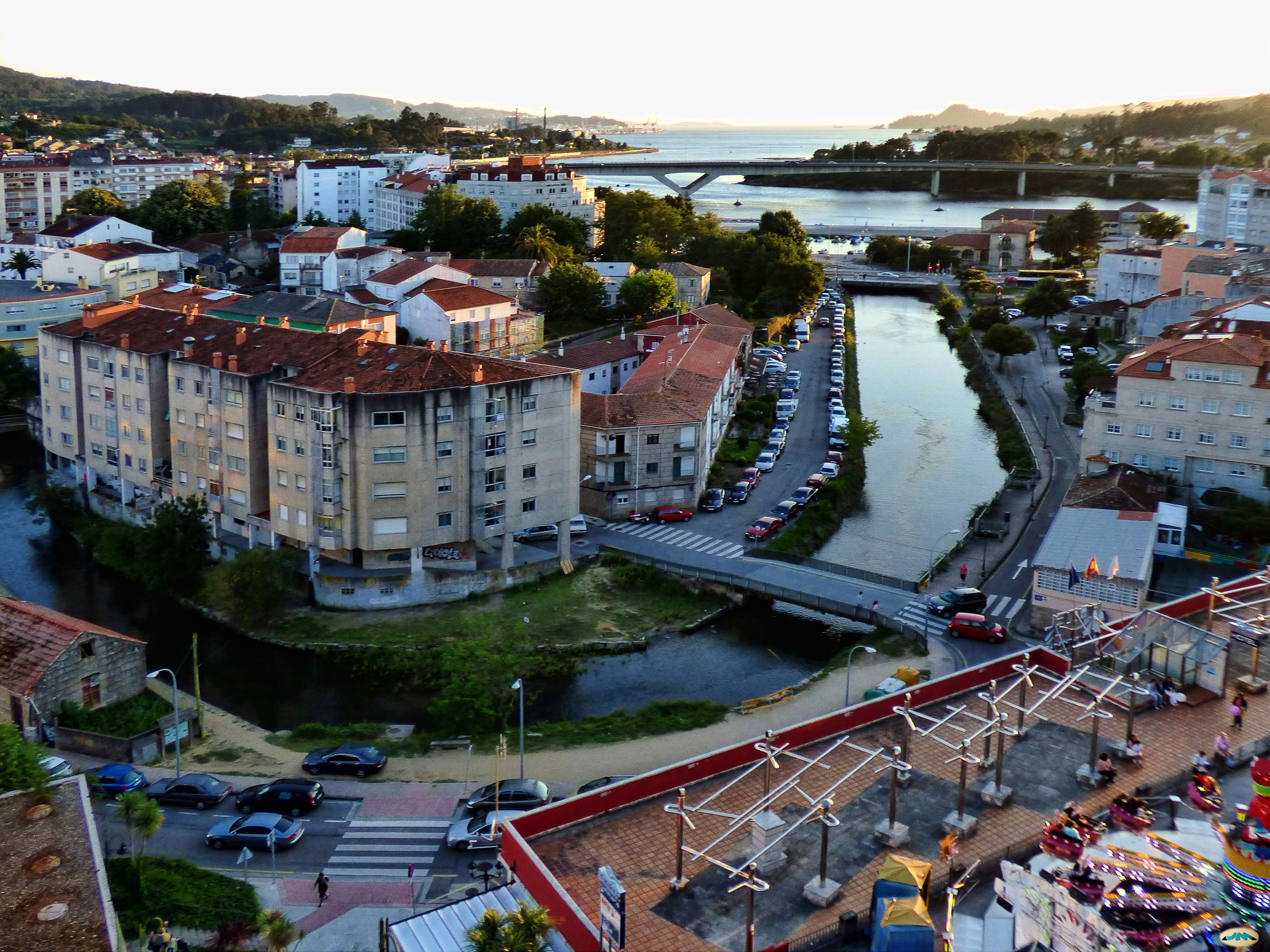
Part of the Gafos River where there were many quays

== See also ==
=== Bibliography ===
- Aganzo, Carlos (2010). Pontevedra. Ciudades con encanto (in Spanish). Madrid: El País-Aguilar. p. 19; 86–90; 122. ISBN 978-8403509344.
- Durán Villa, Francisco (2000). Provincia de Pontevedra (in Spanish). Madrid: Mediterráneo. pp. 76–78, 84, 92. ISBN 8471563371.
- Fernández Martínez, Carla (2016). Pontevedra. La memoria rescatada: Vistas y visiones de una ciudad atlántica (in Spanish). Pontevedra: Diputación de Pontevedra. pp. 347–373. ISBN 978-8484574408.
- Fontoira Surís, Rafael (2009). Pontevedra monumental (in Galician). Pontevedra: Diputación de Pontevedra. p. 484;502;532–547. ISBN 9788484573272.
- José Benito García Iglesias (2017). Donde la salmuera. A Moureira y sus gentes (in Spanish). Pontevedra: Alfil. ISBN 978-84-697-7628-5.
- Riveiro Tobío, Elvira (2008). Descubrir Pontevedra (in Spanish). Pontevedra: Edicións do Cumio. p. 8;54–59. ISBN 9788482890852.
- Pereira Fernández, José Manuel (1999). "Pontevedra y el mar en tiempos de Carlos I" (PDF). Cuadernos Monográficos del Instituto de Historia y Cultura Naval (in Spanish). 34. Madrid: Ministerio de Defensa. ISSN 0212-467X.

=== Related articles ===
- Pontevedra Bullring
- Chapel of Saint Roch
- Burgo Bridge
- Barca Bridge
- Plaza de Concepción Arenal

=== External links ===
- A Moureira neighbourhood on the website Galicia Tourism
- A Moureira neighbourhood on the website Visit-Pontevedra
- O Meu Barrio: A Moureira, programme on TVG
- Pontevedra: A Moureira, documentary on RTVE
