= Walls of Pontevedra =

Walls remnants in the city of Pontevedra, Spain

- Muralla de Pontevedra
- Pontevedra, Spain
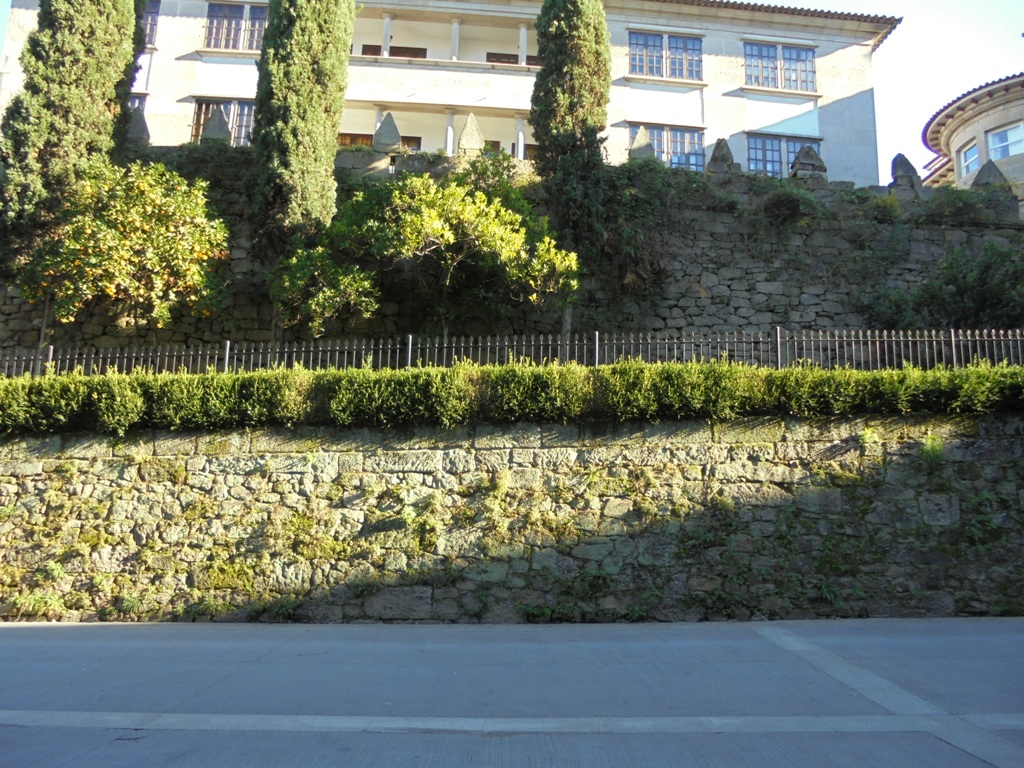
- Walls of Pontevedra remnants in Arzobispo Malvar Street

Site information
- Type: Walls
- Owner: City of Pontevedra, Spain
- Condition: Remnants

Location
- Coordinates: 42°26′02.0″N 8°38′51.0″W
- Height: Up to 7 m (23 ft)

Site history
- Built: 12th century – 15th century
- Materials: Granite

The walls of Pontevedra were a fortification of the city of Pontevedra (Spain), which disappeared for the most part towards the end of the 19th century, although some remains are still visible, the most important being the crenellated section in Arzobispo Malvar Street. This complete section, approximately 40 metres long, can be accessed from the gardens of the two buildings on the west side of Santa María Avenue.

There are also sections of the walls that are part of more recent buildings and have been highlighted during the renovation of these buildings, such as the section next to the old Trabancas gate, which was incorporated and highlighted in the renovation of the Savoy café.

== History ==
=== Origin ===
The first walled enclosure of the city was built in the 12th century. The construction of the definitive walls of Pontevedra began in the 13th century with the aim of serving as a defensive fortification of the city. Its construction continued in the 14th century and was finally completed in the 15th century. The walls remained unchanged in form and appearance until they were demolished four centuries later. According to the historian Juega Puig, the walls of Pontevedra were extended three times, the first between 1300 and 1325 and the last between 1450 and 1480.

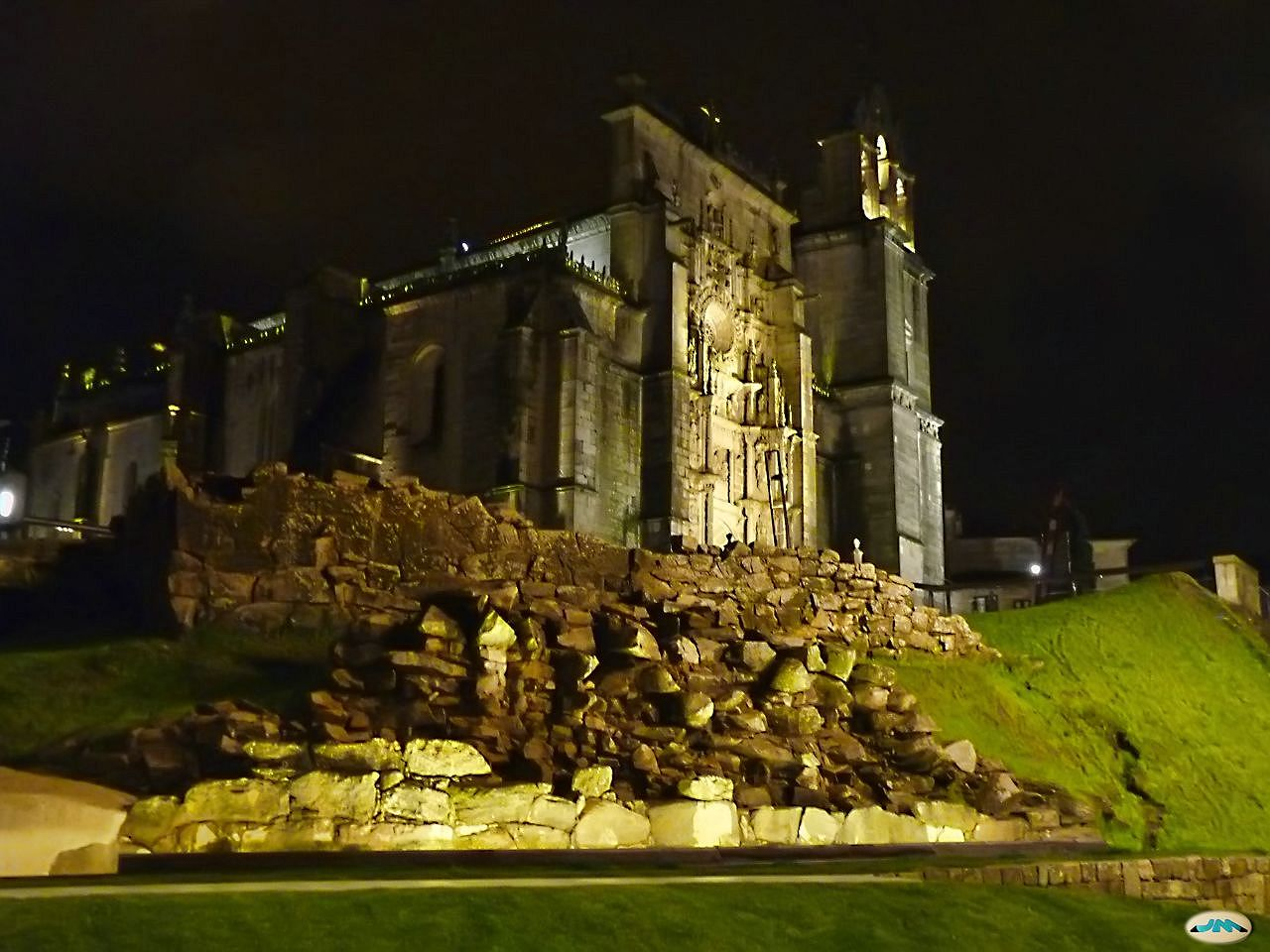
Remains of the ramparts next to the Basilica of Saint-Mary Major

The first walled enclosure would include the area around the basilica of Saint-Mary Major. Its first expansion could be linked to a phase of generalised growth of urban centres linked to the fishing world, since in 1229 Pontevedra was granted the privilege of drying hake and selling it by sea and land throughout the kingdom and outside it, and in 1238 the town was also granted the exclusive right to manufacture fish oil. A new parish, St Bartholomew's, was created, accommodating more people and increasing the fortified area, transforming the original almond-shaped layout into an almost circular one.

The second expansion took place between 1300 and 1325. The city grew and this led, among other things, to the installation of religious orders that founded the convents of Saint Dominic, Saint Francis and Saint Claire, which, although located outside the city, responded to the increase in the number of souls to whom they could spread the faith.

The third expansion took place in the middle of the 15th century, and included the convent of St. Francis. This enlargement had three reasons: the warlike nature of the period, which required greater defensive reinforcements; economic and demographic growth; and the need for new spaces in view of the concession of the Feira Franca by Henry IV of Castile.

=== Degradation and abandonment ===
As the threat of attacks on the city diminished, the wall lost its function and usefulness, which contributed to a large extent to its gradual abandonment. As time passed and military advances were made, the wall became obsolete and of little use in the defence of the town. The English attack on Homobod in 1719 contributed greatly to its deterioration.

=== Disappearance of the walls ===
In the middle of the 19th century and due to the above-mentioned circumstances, by agreement of the city council, it was decided to demolish the city walls to allow the expansion of the city and to follow the example of other European cities, as the walls were considered an anachronism and the new trends of demolishing the medieval walls gave an air of modernity to the new conception of urbanism.

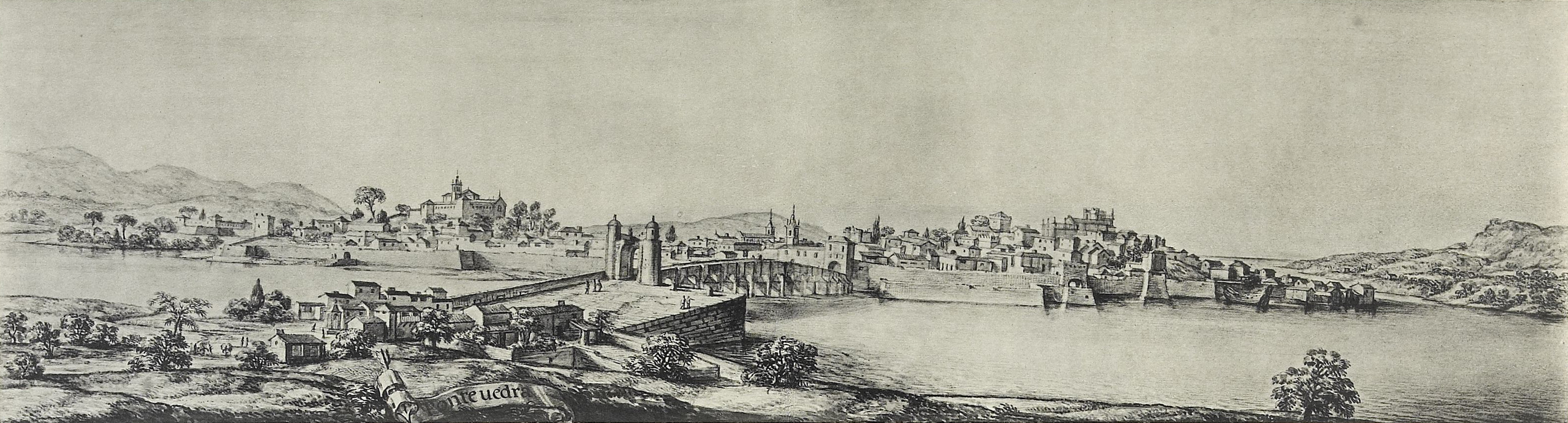
Pontevedra in 1669 in an illustration by Pier Maria Baldi

The demolition work was carried out between 1848 and 1886. The demolition of the walls began with the Trabancas Gate (the passage between the Plaza de la Peregrina and the Plaza de la Herrería), followed by the Santa Maria Gate in 1852 and the Galera Gate. Later, the St. Dominic's Gate was dismantled in 1854, sold to the Treasury and placed on the gate of the former St. Francis convent. The Bastida Tower, the Golden Tower and the fortifications of the Burgo Bridge were also demolished, as well as the Archbishops' Towers, which had been in ruins since the English attack on Homobod in 1719 and were finally demolished in 1873.

Only the St. Dominic's Gate in the city walls was preserved, and it was partially moved to the disused convent of St. Francis, serving as the gate to its main entrance.

=== The walls today ===
Nowadays, only a few small samples remain of what these defensive walls were in their time: a crenellated section in Arzobispo Malvar Street and various archaeological remains and remnants in their former perimeter, such as those in front of the Basilica of Saint-Mary Major or in Sierra Street, which is part of the Castelao Building of the Pontevedra Museum.

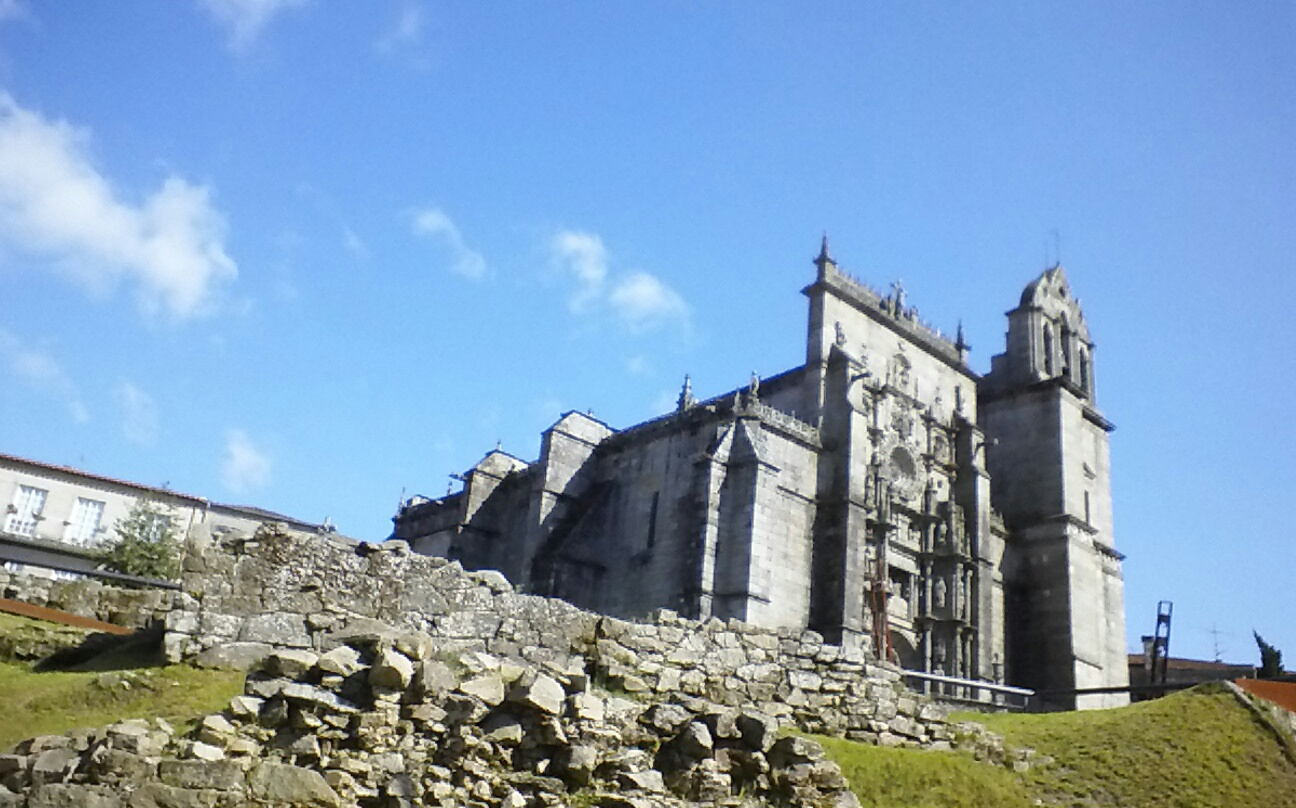
Remains of the ramparts near the old Saint-Mary Gate

In the 21st century, during various urban rehabilitation works in the old town, various remains of the medieval wall of Pontevedra were discovered during excavations. These have been studied, catalogued, preserved and restored in most cases to form part of the city's architectural heritage. The most important ones are located in Arzobispo Malvar Street, in front of the Campillo de Santa María, and have been integrated into the urban landscape by means of alleys and grassy areas. They have also been integrated into the Castelao building of the Pontevedra Museum, where the remains of the wall can be seen from the outside in the northern part of the city, close to the Lérez River. Other remains that have appeared integrate different constructions in the perimeter of the old town and have also been restored. They can be seen in the case of buildings for public use, such as the side of the Café Savoy and the art nouveau house that belonged to the Pilgrim Virgin brotherhood. Also on Michelena Street, at number 20, the tapas bar La Muralla has preserved another piece of the medieval walls integrated into the basement, which has become a focal point and another element of the interior decoration.

== Description ==
The fortified enclosure was organised around two hills or mounds: those occupied by the Basilica of Saint-Mary Major to the west of the old town and by the convent of St Francis to the east. The masonry wall was 7 metres high and was topped by a row of battlements and a wall walk along its entire length. This walkway was two metres wide. The ramparts were punctuated by numerous towers and defences and their perimeter reached 2,170 metres in length. Probably the best known tower was the Bastida Tower, located on the site now occupied by the 19th-century town hall. Outside there was a ditch or moat.

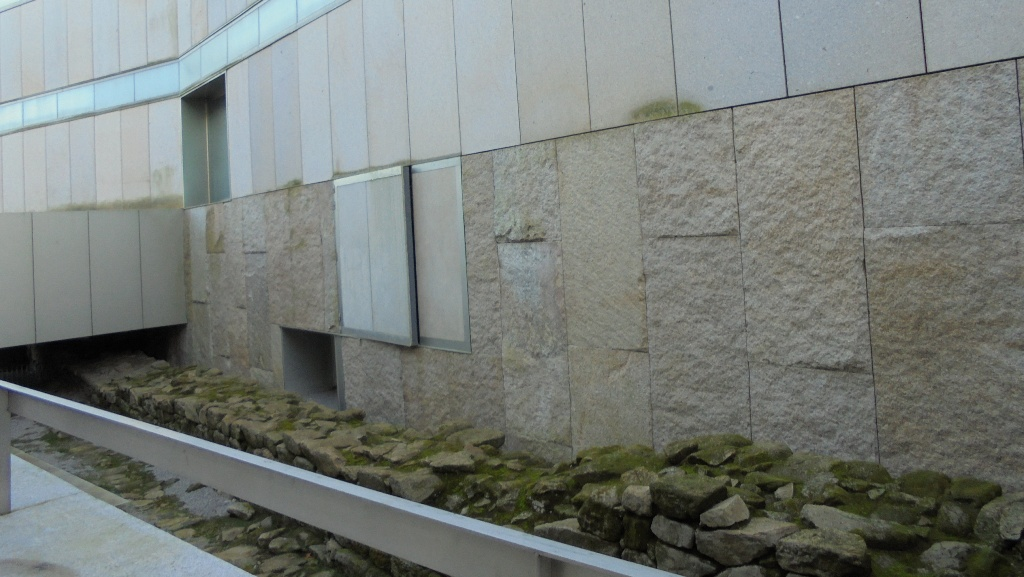
Remains of the city walls in the north of the historic centre, integrated into the Castelao Building of the Pontevedra Museum.

The city walls had 4 large gates and 7 gate shutters. The four main gates of the city were linked to the four royal roads that led to Santiago, Orense, Tuy and Marín. These gates were :

- St. Mary's Gate: it was located next to the Basilica of St. Mary Major.
- St. Dominic's Gate: it was close to the Dominican convent, now the ruins of St. Dominic's. It was connected to the fishermen's neighbourhood of A Moureira.
- Trabancas Gate: it linked the Herrería square with the Pilgrim Virgin Square.
- Rocheforte Gate: this opened onto Santa Clara Street, where the Gothic convent of the Poor Clares is located. It was connected to the Camino de Castilla.

In addition to these, there were two other gates (the Galera and Ribeiro gates), the Bridge Gate, next to the Burgo Bridge, and the Baron Gate, next to the Palace of the Counts of Maceda, the current Parador de Turismo.

This defensive complex was completed by fortified towers along the perimeter of the walls. These were:

- The Archiepiscopal towers. They were near the Basilica of Saint Mary Major.
- The Gold Tower. In the northern part of the city walls, at the confluence of what are now Sierra and Padre Amoedo streets. Its name comes from the fact that it seems to have been built in the style of the Gold Tower of Seville.
- The Bastida Tower. A defensive tower that stood on the site of the current Pontevedra City Hall.
- Two more towers between the Trabancas and Rocheforte gates.
- Another two towers on the banks of the Lérez River.

The reconstruction of the main gates of the ancient walls of Pontevedra is recreated during the Feira Franca, a medieval festival held every year on the first weekend of September and commemorating the tax-free fair granted to the city by King Henry IV in the 15th century.

=== Influence in urban planning ===
After the construction of the walls, the urban fabric is restricted within the limits of the wall, which marks the size of the buildings and even their height, as those of more than three floors were considered a threat to the defensive system. The main gates of the walls of Pontevedra mark the communication axes of the city with the four cardinal points.

=== Functions of the walls ===
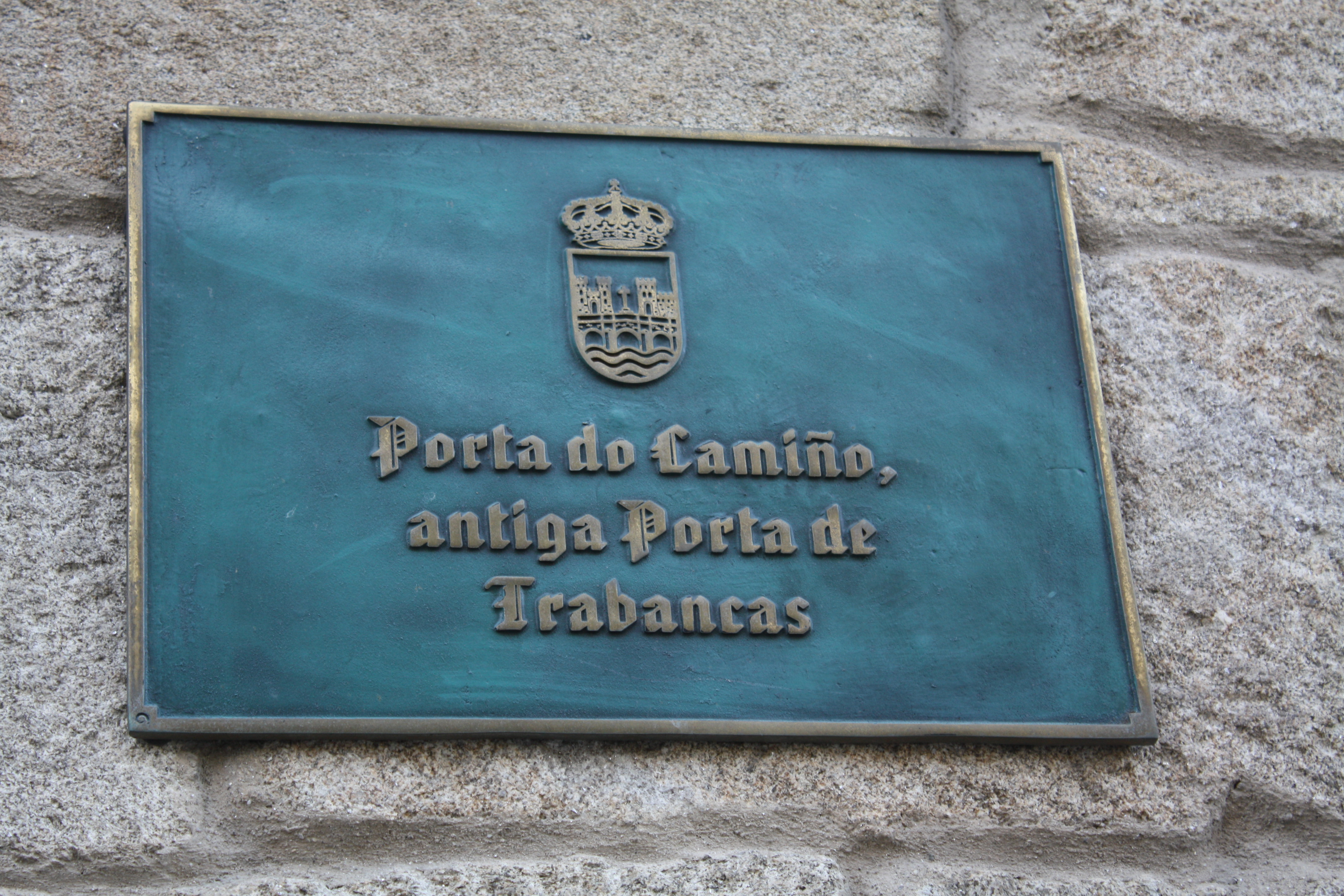
Plaque that recalls the place where the Trabancas Gate was located, through which the Portuguese Way passed in the walled city.

The walls had various functions: protection against enemies, but also against epidemics, as they did not allow the infected to cross the gates. They also had a moral function, such as ensuring that prostitutes could carry out their activities outside the walls: in Pontevedra, this place was used to build the church of the Pilgrim Virgin.

However, the most important function of the walls was to protect the transit of goods, the basis of taxation: the two basic products of Pontevedra's economy, the wine of Ribeiro de Avia and the autumn sardines caught by seine fishing, had to be subject to fixed routes.

In Pontevedra, wine could only be brought in through the Saint Clare gate, which connected with the old Castilian Way, where the muleteers brought the wines of Avia on the backs of their mules and in pickled skins; The Trabancas Gate, which opened the Plaza de la Herrería to the Portuguese Way, connected with the vineyards of the Lower Minho; taking advantage of the facilities offered by the Galician depression, its carriers used carts with two oxen and as many wheels, each carrying a wine barrel.

The fish merchants had also had these two gates marked and the Ribeiro gate was the one on the Burgo Bridge; they were muleteers who transported loads of dried fish to the interior of the country, packed in baskets, never in barrels or wineskins. This means of controlling the transit by land of the two main commercial products was sufficiently effective for the owners of the royal rents, in 1594, to demand that the council maintain this ancient custom in force.

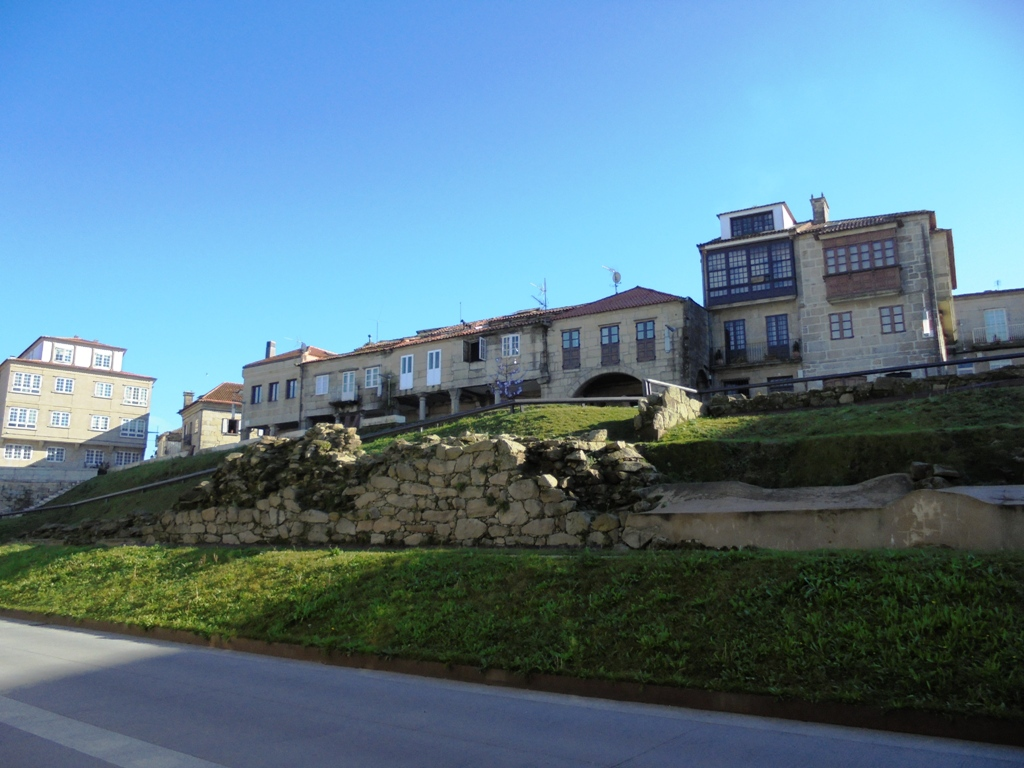
Remains in front of the Campillo de Santa Maria with its medieval houses.

== See also ==
=== Bibliography ===
- Fortes Bouzán, Xosé (1993). Historia de la ciudad de Pontevedra. La Coruña: Gaesa.
- García Sainz, Eduardo (2005). Unha ollada á muralla medieval de Pontevedra. Gallaecia, No. 24.
- Messia de la Cerda y Pita, Luis F. (189). Heráldica, escudos de armas labrados en piedra existentes en la zona de Pontevedra. Pontevedra: Diputación de Pontevedra.

=== Related articles ===
- Old town of Pontevedra
- Plaza de la Peregrina
- Pontevedra Museum
- Archiepiscopal Towers Interpretation Centre
