= Pontevedra Museum =

Museum in Pontevedra, Spain

- Museo de Pontevedra

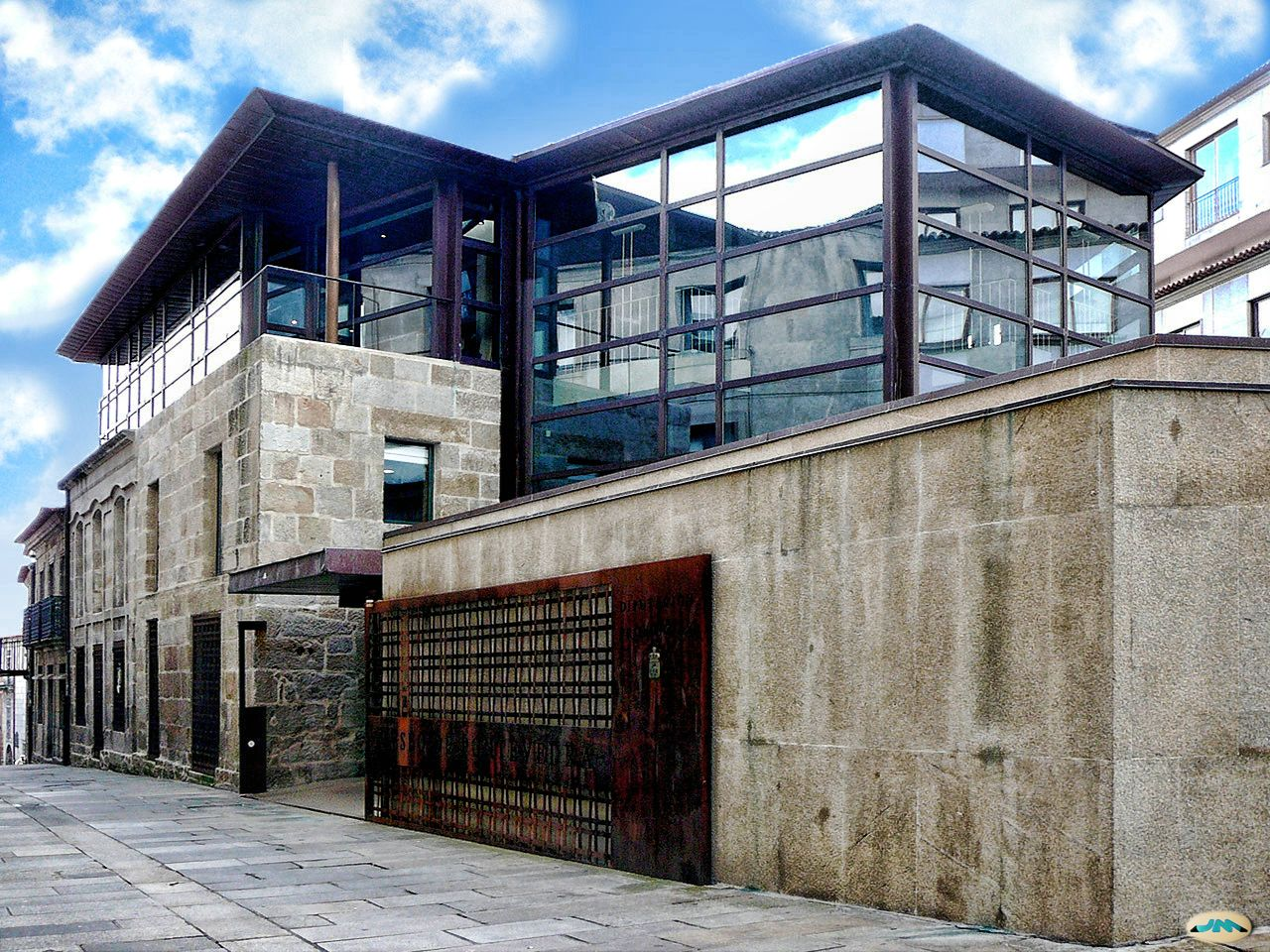
- The Fernández López Building extension (2002)
- Former name: Pontevedra Provincial Museum
- Established: 30 December 1927; 98 years ago
- Location: Pontevedra, Spain
- Coordinates: 42°25′57″N 8°38′35″W
- Type: Art museum, Archaeology museum, Ethnographic museum
- Visitors: 208,908 (2025)
- Director: Mª Ángeles Tilve Jar
- Owner: Provincial Deputation of Pontevedra
- Website: museo.depo.gal

Pontevedra Museum (formerly the Pontevedra Provincial Museum) is a museum in the Galician city of Pontevedra in Spain. It was founded by the Provincial Deputation of Pontevedra on 30 December 1927 and has six buildings for its dedicated to permanent and temporary exhibitions. The museum's collections are multidisciplinary, classified into rooms for painting, sculpture, archaeology, decorative arts, engraving and ethnography.

The Pontevedra Museum was declared a Cultural Interest Property on 1 March 1962. It was awarded the Gold Medal of Galicia in 1996.

== History ==
Pontevedra Museum was founded by the Provincial Council of Pontevedra in the pazo of Castro Monteagudo on 30 December 1927 and opened to the public on 10 August 1929.

Since 2012, the museum has occupied five historic buildings plus a sixth modern building, construction on which was begun in 2004 and inaugurated in 2012. These six buildings are: the Gothic ruins of the San Domingo Church and the García Flórez, Fernández López, Sarmiento (former Jesuit baroque college of the Saint Bartholomew's Church) and Castro Monteagudo buildings as well as a large modern building, the Castelao Building, inaugurated in 2013.

In the first half of 2022, the museum recorded 108,543 visitors and by the end of the year almost 175,000.

=== Management ===
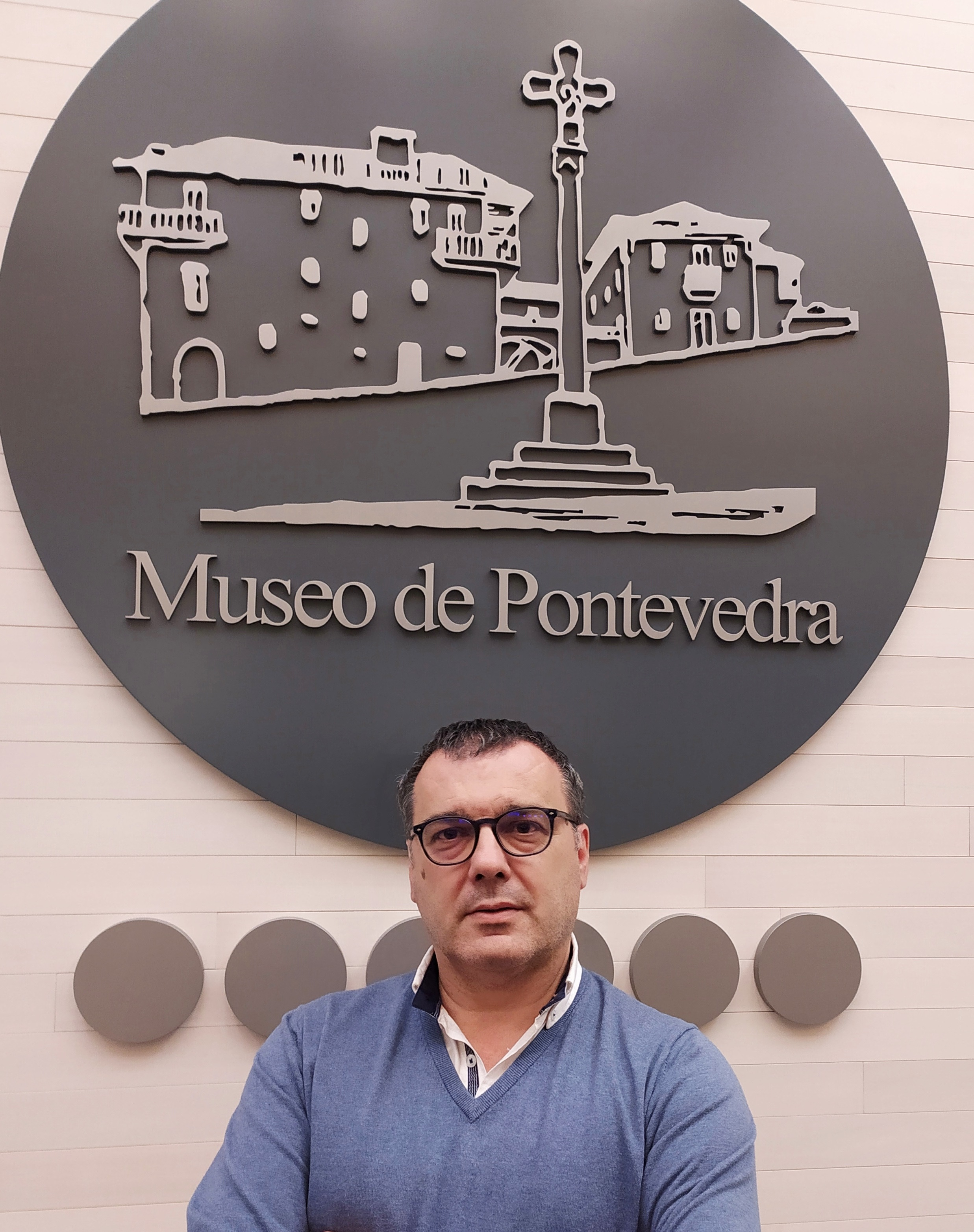
Museum logo.

The six directors of the Pontevedra Museum have been:

- 1927–1937: Casto Sampedro Folgar
- 1937–1940: Gerardo Álvarez Limeses
- 1940–1986: Xosé Filgueira Valverde
- 1986–2018: José Carlos Valle Pérez
- 2019–2022: José Manuel Rey García
- 2023: Ángeles Tilve Jar

== Buildings ==
=== Castro Monteagudo ===
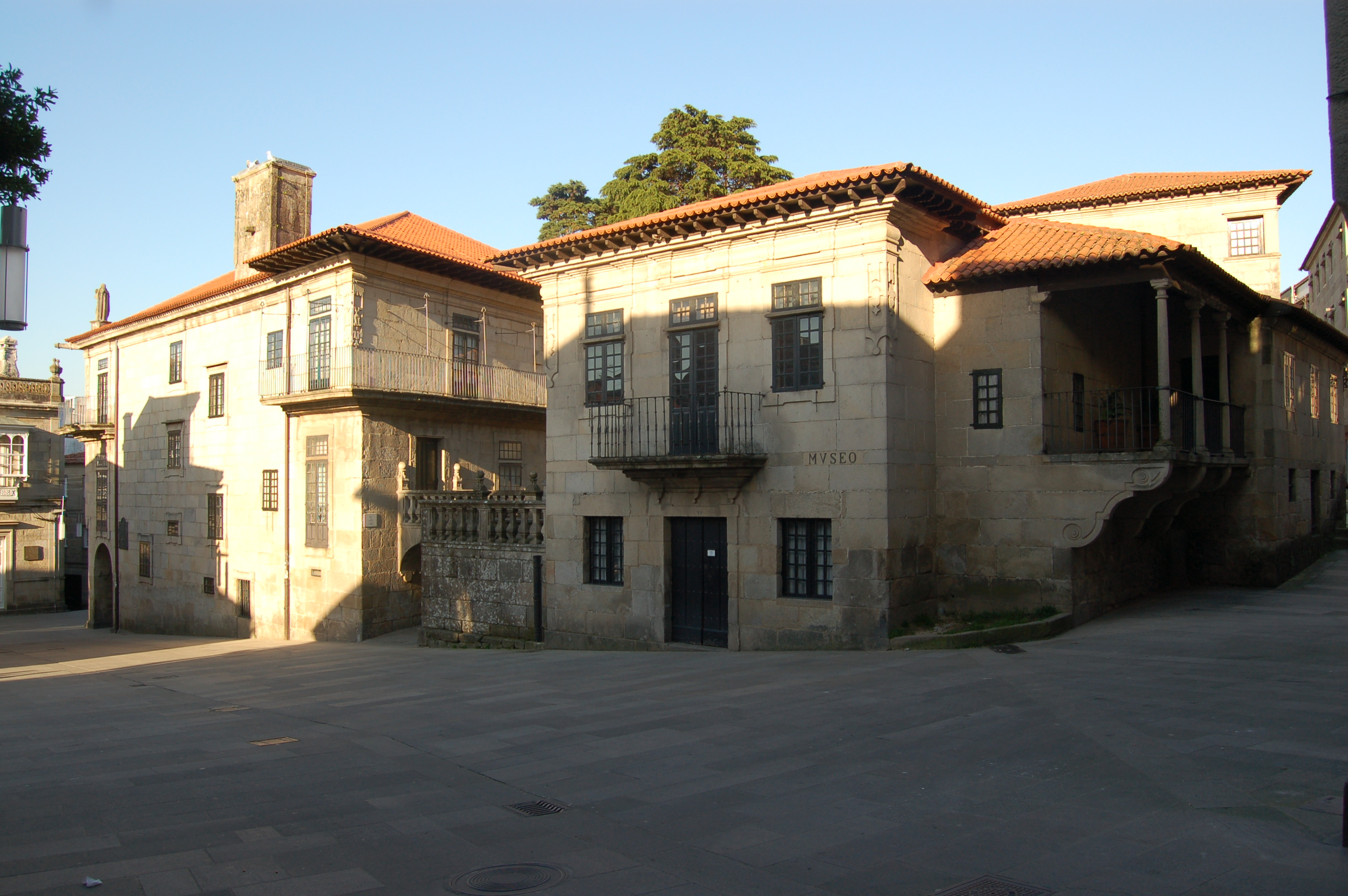
Castro Monteagudo building (right) and García Flórez building (left)

This building dates from 1760, and bears this name because it was built by José de Castro y Monteagudo, the first auditor of the province of Pontevedra. It is the first building of the museum.

The different rooms traditionally displayed archaeological collections, pre-Roman and Roman goldsmithery, silverware and Gothic, Renaissance, still life and Spanish paintings. The permanent exhibition is currently being redesigned.

==== Archaeological rooms ====
Three rooms in the Castro Monteagudo building are dedicated to archaeology, presenting significant remains from the prehistoric and protohistoric stages of Galicia. During the last renovation works, all these archaeological collections were transferred to the Sarmiento building. Some of the collections remain in their place in 2014, such as the traditional collection of Galician goldsmith's art.

==== Fernández de la Mora y Mon silverware collection ====
The collection of civil and religious silverware, on permanent display in the Castro Monteagudo building, was acquired by the writer and diplomat Gonzalo Fernández de la Mora y Mon. It consists of pieces from before 1900, with civil art predominating over sacred art. The pieces come from the Iberian Peninsula and Latin America, as well as from other places such as Russia and China.

A series of nickel-plated silverware (with lead alloy inlays) includes Russian boxes and cup holders, Turkish snuff boxes and Thai cups.

One of the oldest pieces is a 15th or 16th century Byzantine baptismal cup. The most historically interesting is a New England preacher Thomas Hooker box from 1600, and the most noble is an early-19th-century Moscow snuff box with curved edges.

The most valuable piece is an imperial tureen, forged in Strasbourg in the 1800s, as well as a trophy jar given by the Empress of Germany, Augusta-Victoria of Schleswig-Holstein-Sonderburg-Augustenburg, to the winner of a race in 1898, with gold coins inlaid with the effigies of the three emperors who ruled in the same year.

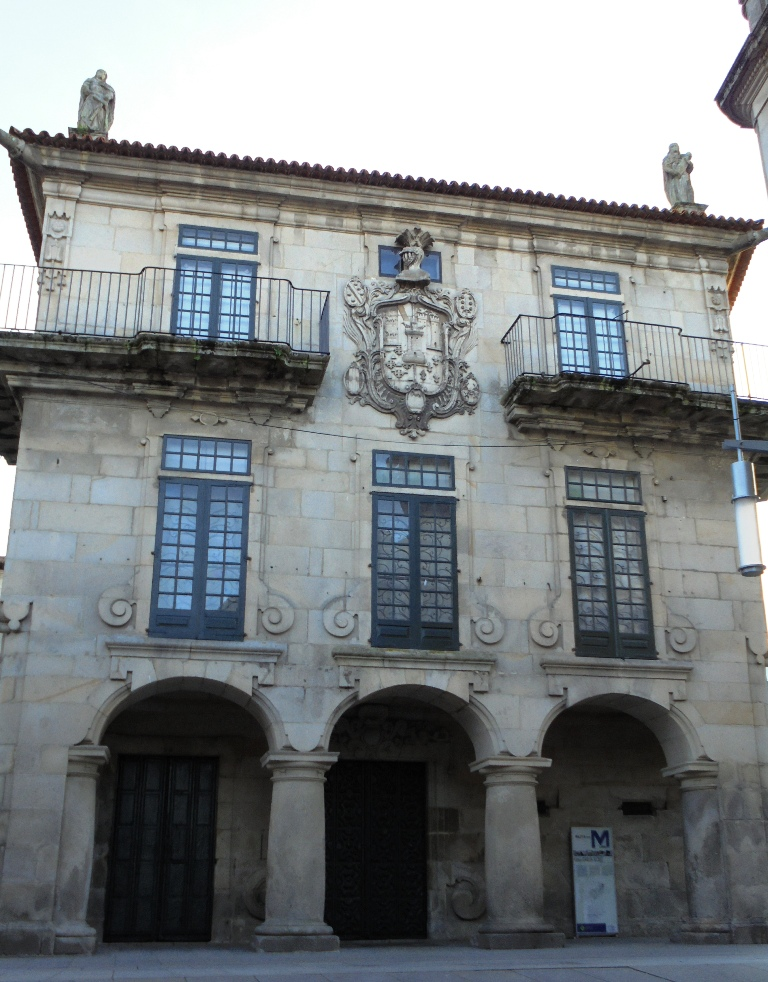
García Flórez building

=== García Flórez ===
The Pazo García Flórez is named after Antonio García Estévez Fariña and his wife Tomasa Suárez Flórez, who built this manor house on a previous pazo in the 18th century. It became part of the Provincial Museum of Pontevedra in 1943.

The collection on display in its rooms includes furniture and navigation equipment, the cabin of the armored frigate Numancia, religious sculptures, pottery and a traditional Galician cuisine, Engravings, Sargadelos earthenware and jet objects.

=== Fernández López ===
It was built in 1962 and completed in 1965. The name is a tribute to the main donor José Fernández López. It exhibits a large collection of romantic and historical paintings from the 19th and 20th centuries, with rooms specifically dedicated to Goya and Joaquín Sorolla.

This building houses the museum's administrative offices, the library and the graphic archives (with over 500,000 entries).

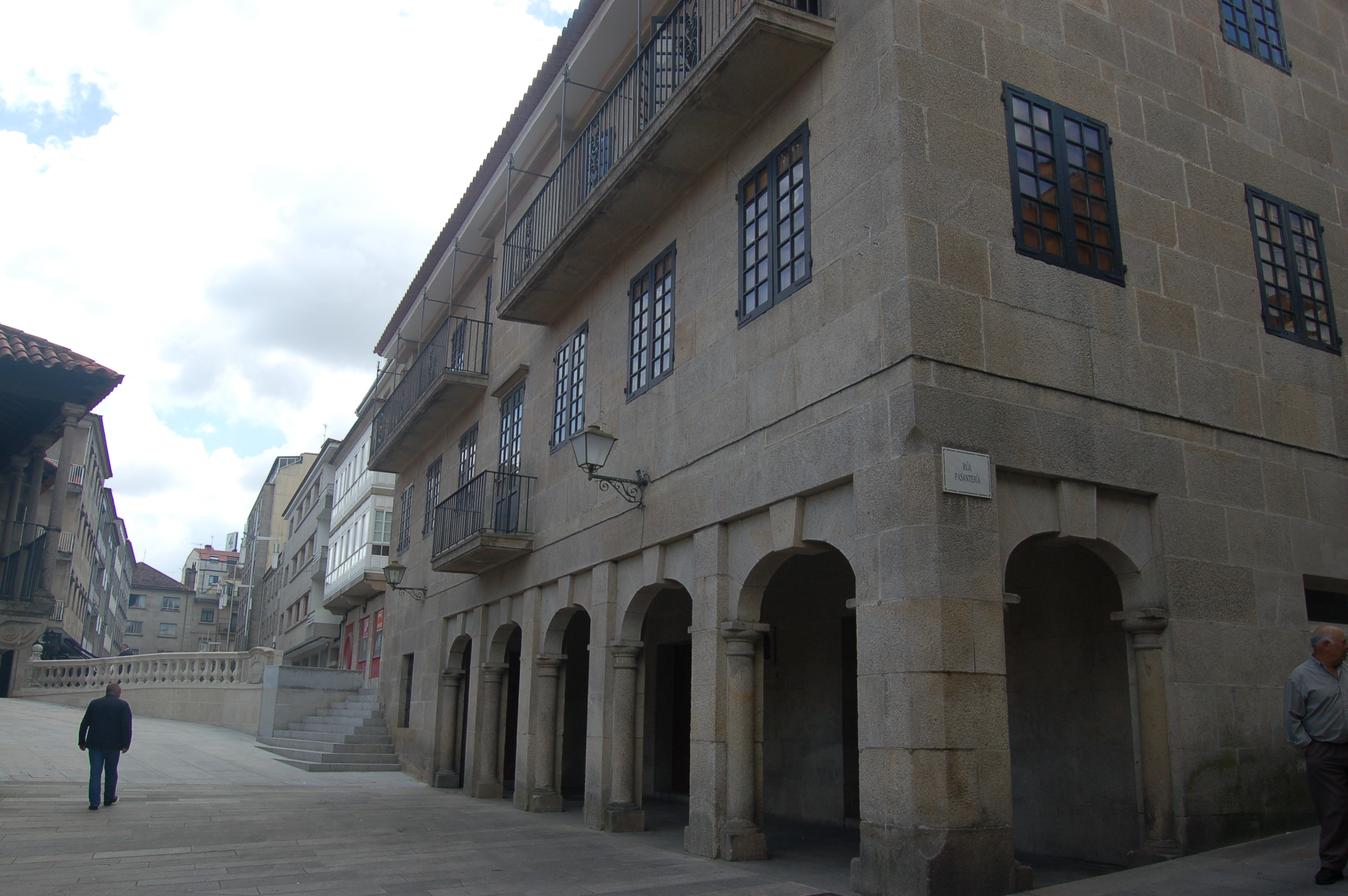
Fernández López building

The museum's Fernández López building was extended in the early 2000s, with the construction of an annex building designed in 1999 by the architect Celestino García Braña between Pasantería and Laranxo streets. The work was completed in 2002 and the new 1200 square metre building, a synthesis of traditional and modern architecture (consisting of the annexe of 2 houses and the construction of another building on the site of a former orchard) and intended for offices and rooms to provide service to researchers and documentalists, was inaugurated on 2 May 2003. The extension was awarded that same year by the Galician Association of Architects.

==== Library ====
The library started with a batch of 108 books. In 2007, its collection included over 6,000 serial titles, over 150,000 bibliographic records, 500 maps and plans and documentation sections. It is a specialised library available to Researchers, with a reading room open to the public only for consultation of the collections, which cannot be borrowed. The library fulfils several tasks of scientific interest and collaborates with the Ministry of Culture and the Galician Government.

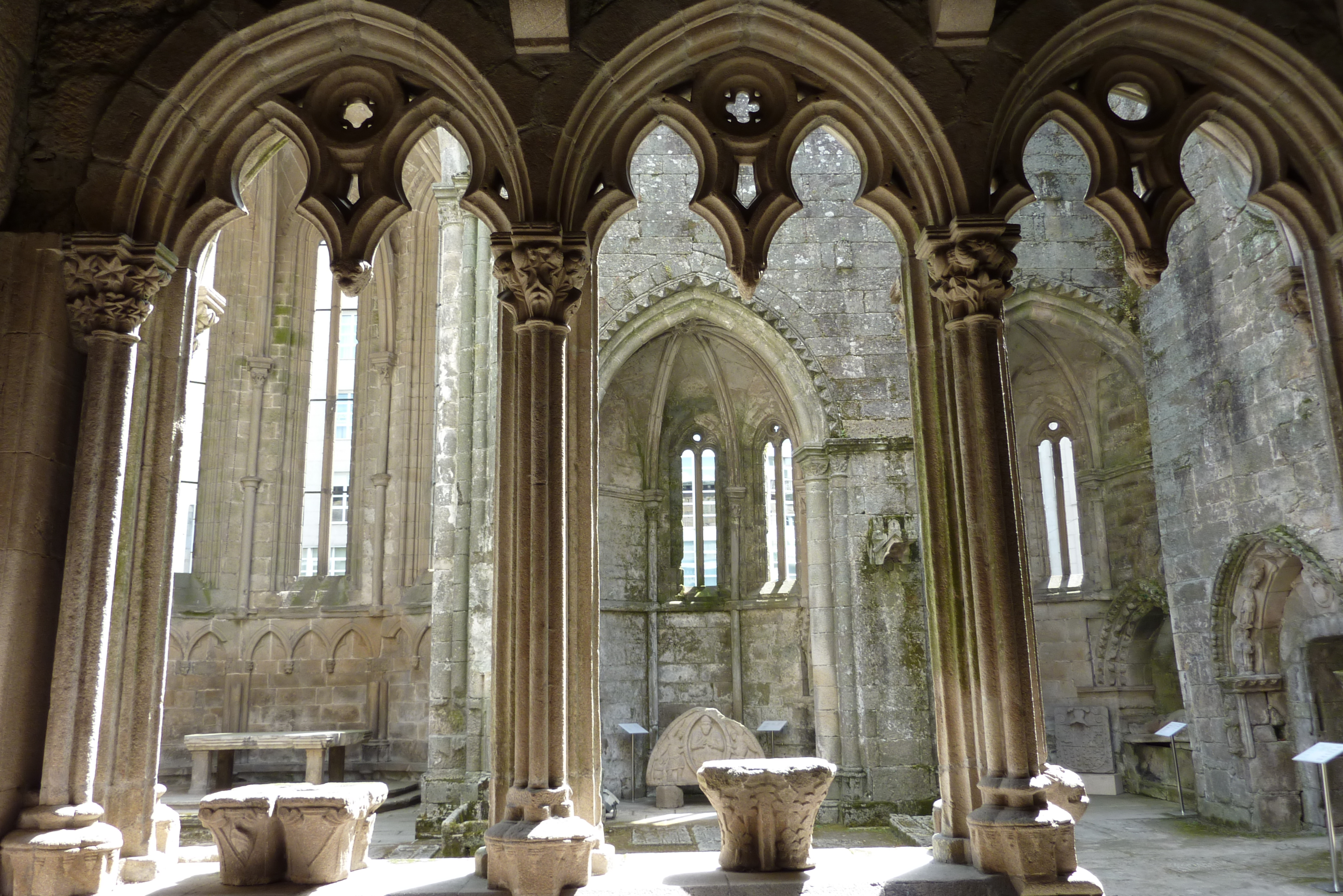
Ruins of St. Dominic's convent.

=== Ruins of St. Dominic's Convent ===
It is the oldest building in the museum. It occupies the remains of the convent of San Domingo, built in the 14th and 15th centuries and abandoned after the Spanish confiscation of Mendizábal in 1834. The convent only preserves the main chapel and the side chapels of the chevet.

In addition to the remains of the church itself, which are still standing, the ruins also contain a large collection of coats of arms, tombstones, canopies, Visigothic and Romanesque capitals and various Statues.

=== Sarmiento ===
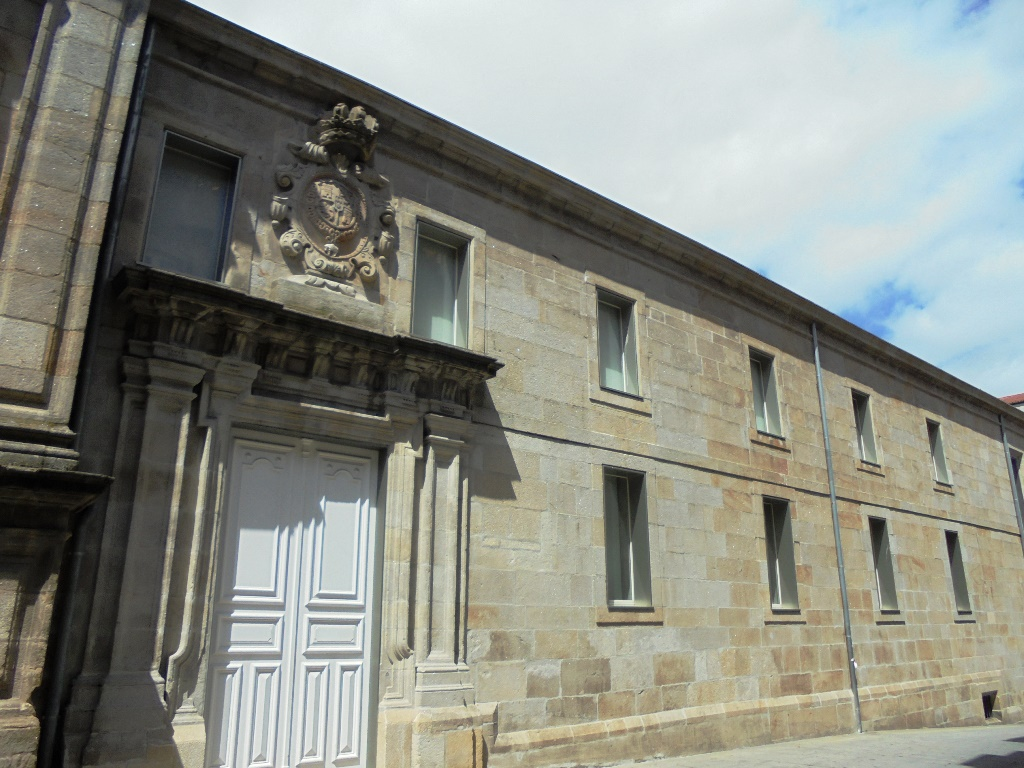
Sarmiento building

This is the former Jesuit College, a baroque building begun in 1695 and completed in 1714 next to the church of St Bartholomew. It was incorporated into the museum in 1979.

After a thorough remodelling, it was opened to the public on 21 August 2013, with the archaeological collection and medieval Galician art from the 13th century. The collection of Torcs and other pieces of the Castro culture from the treasures of Caldas de Reis and Agolada, among others, is particularly noteworthy. Galician ceramics are also on display, and there are also rooms dedicated to the city of Pontevedra and the Pilgrim Virgin.

In the security room of the building is the treasure of Caldas de Reis, dating from the Bronze Age. It was discovered buried in a vineyard on 20 December 1940 and is the most important gold treasure in the Iberian Peninsula and one of the most important in Europe due to its weight.

=== Castelao ===
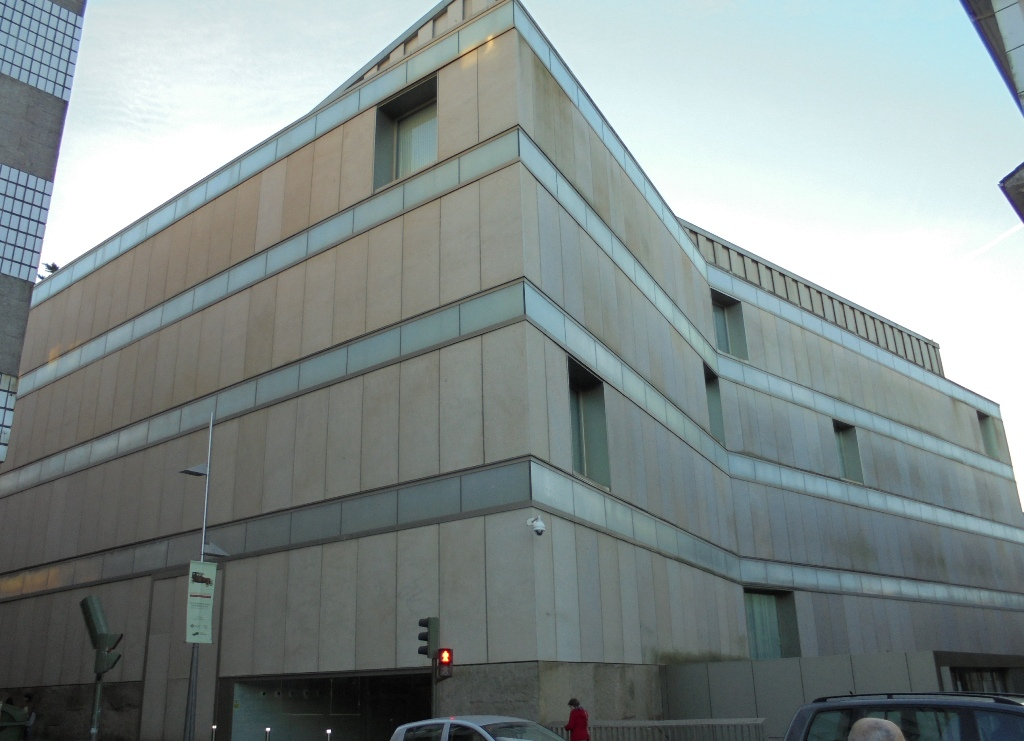
Castelao building

The sixth building of the museum is a building constructed between 2004 and 2008, designed by the architects Eduardo Pesquera and Jesús Ulargui, which means an extension of 10,000 m2 for exhibitions and Workshops. This sixth building was inaugurated on 4 January 2013. It is located behind the church of Saint Bartholomew.

It is spread over four floors and a ground floor. The lower floor is dedicated to temporary exhibitions and the three upper floors are dedicated to the permanent exhibition of the museum's collections, in 23 rooms. These include collections of Galician art, from the Gothic to the modern period, as well as collections of other Spanish and foreign artists.

The first floor is dedicated to Galician art, from the Gothic period to the end of the 19th century, under the name Xeración Doente. Sculptures and relics are on display, including the altarpiece of Santa Maria de Belvis (from the Dominican convent in Santiago de Compostela), and various paintings and sculptures by Goya, Gregorio Fernández, Xosé Gambino, Jenaro Pérez Villaamil, Serafin Avendaño etc.

The second floor is dedicated to art from the end of the 19th century to the first third of the 20th century. Works by Ovidio Murguía, Álvarez de Sotomayor, Camilo Díaz, Asorey and busts and instruments by the violinist Manuel Quiroga Losada can be seen here. The two rooms dedicated to Castelao are particularly noteworthy. The museum houses Castelao's most emblematic production, including the original album Nós.

The third floor is dedicated to Galician artists of the 20th and 21st centuries, with later authors such as the Grupo Atlántica.

In the basement there are restoration Workshops, a large auditorium and a cafeteria. The remains of the Pontevedra city walls can also be seen here.

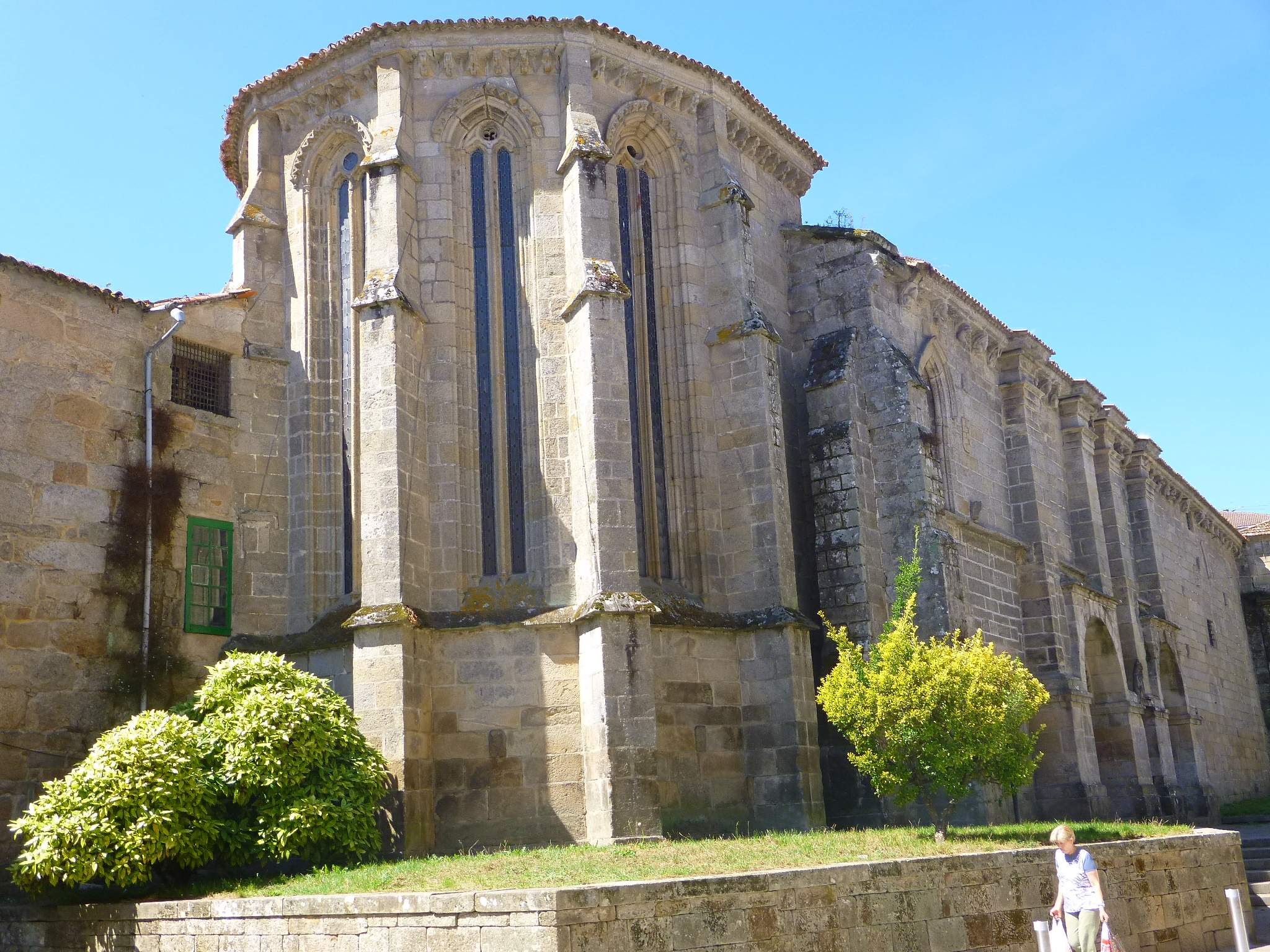
Saint Clares's convent church.

=== Santa Clara ===
On 1 December 2021, the City Council of Pontevedra bought the Saint Clare's Convent from the Order of Poor Clares for €3.2 million. On 3 January 2023, the City Council transferred the complex to the Provincial Deputation retaining the right of use of the gardens and the forest. The Deputation will integrate the convent into the Museum as its seventh building after a comprehensive restoration.

== Scientific publications ==
The museum's annual magazine, El Museo de Pontevedra, was first published in 1942. In addition to two catalogues of each exhibition, the museum publishes Monographs.

== Notable exhibitions ==
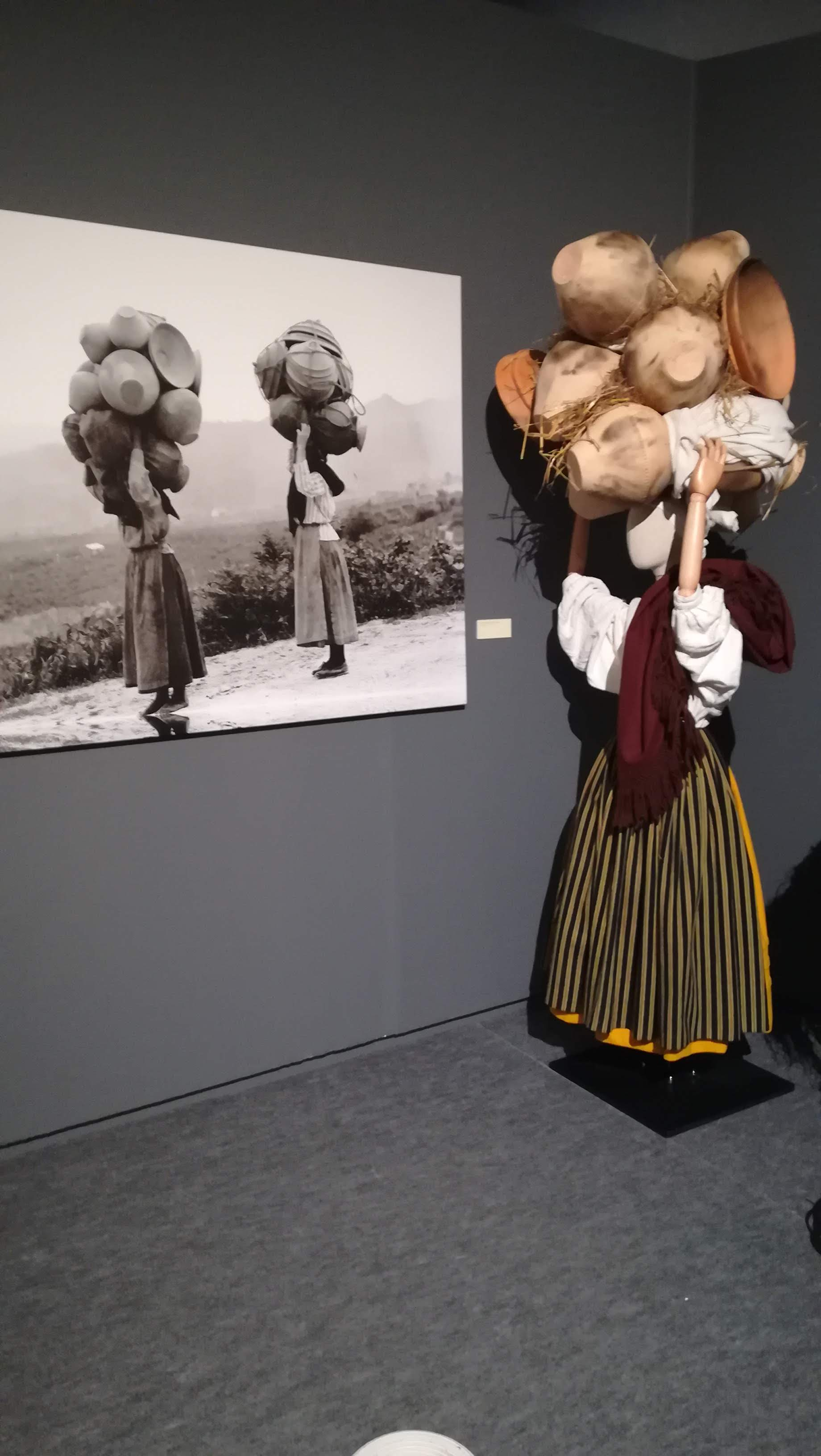
Women carrying ceramic pots to market. Pontevedra Museum.

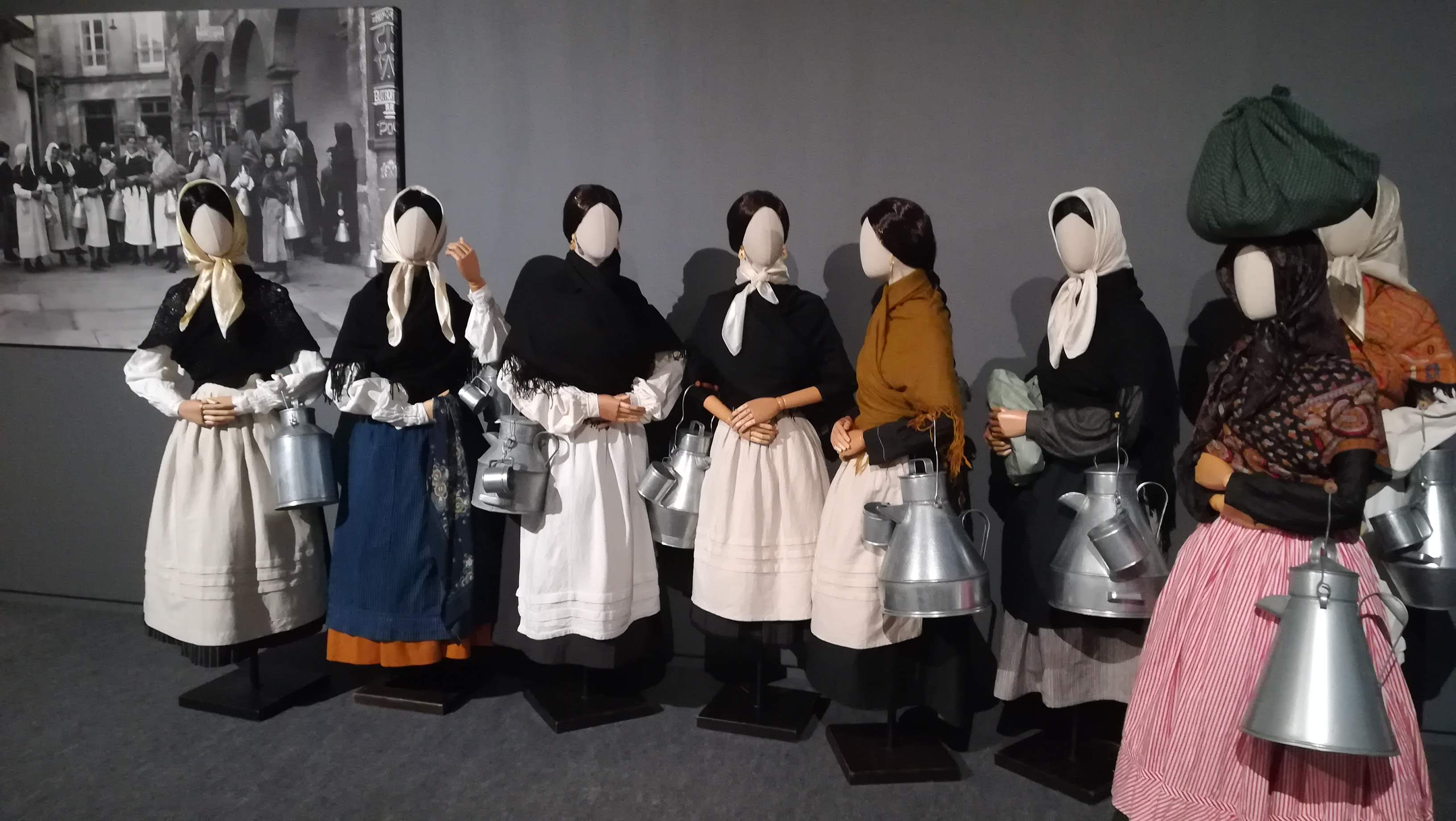
Anderson's photograph and traditional costumes of milkmaids. Pontevedra Museum.

Between August and October 2022, the Museum of Pontevedra held a temporary exhibition of some 75 traditional folk costumes and crafts of Galicia, inspired and accompanied by American photographer Ruth Matilda Anderson's photographs taken between 1924 and 1926. After five years of research by the Ethnographic Association of Pontevedra Sete Espadelas, this exhibition presented a selection of traditional clothing mounted on mannequins and other items of daily life from the museum's historical collection as well as reconstructed in historical detail. Dating back almost 100 years, Anderson's pictures and the recreated scenes of rural life showed, among others, milkmaids gathered in Santiago de Compostela's Rúa Nova at dawn, women carrying ceramic pots to market, craftsmen selling wooden clogs and people in traditional raincoats made of straw. An accompanying catalog was published, with all of Anderson's photographs as well as of the costumes shown in this exhibition. It was visited by more than 14,000 visitors, making it the most successful event of the museum in the five preceding years.

== See also ==
- List of museums in Spain
- Archiepiscopal Towers Interpretation Centre
- Castelao Building
- College of the Society of Jesus in Pontevedra
- Old Town of Pontevedra
- Pazo de Castro Monteagudo
- Pazo de García Flórez
- Ruins of San Domingos
