= Castelao Building =

Museum building in Pontevedra, Spain

- Edificio Castelao del Museo de Pontevedra
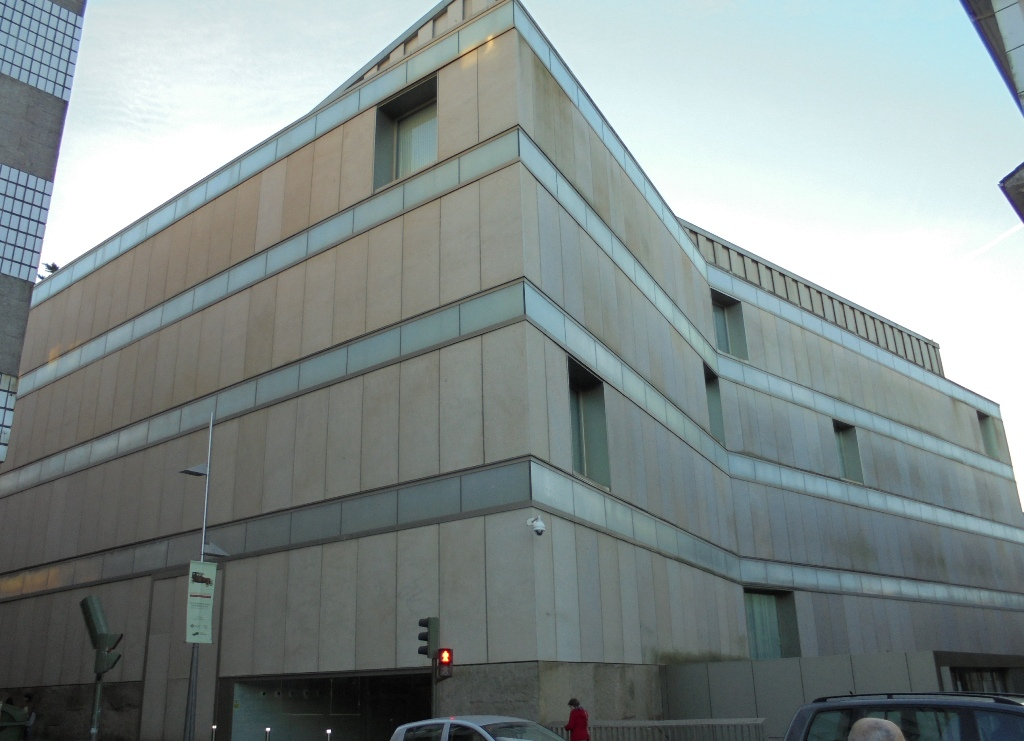
- North façade of the Castelao Building
- Interactive map of the Castelao Building area

General information
- Type: Museum
- Location: Pontevedra, Galicia, Spain
- Coordinates: 42°26′01.3″N 8°38′31.8″W
- Construction started: 2004
- Completed: 2008
- Opening: 4 January 2013
- Owner: Deputation of Pontevedra

Technical details
- Floor count: 4
- Floor area: 10,000 m2

Design and construction
- Architects: Jesús Ulargui and Eduardo Pesquera
- Main contractor: ACS Group

Website
- www.museo.depo.gal/museo/edificios/ga.01050011.html

The Castelao building is a modern architectural building from the beginning of the 21st century located on the corner of Padre Amoedo Carballo and Sierra Street in Pontevedra, Spain, on the edge of the historic centre. It belongs to the Pontevedra Museum.

== History ==
On 2 May 2003, during the inauguration of the extension of the Fernández López building of the Museum of Pontevedra, its director announced that a new museum building would be built between Cobián Roffignac and Sierra streets.

The building was built between 2004 and 2008 according to a project by the architects Eduardo Pesquera and Jesús Ulargui to overcome the Pontevedra Museum's lack of exhibition space. It is located on the site of the former orchard of the Jesuit College in the city, behind the college and the church of Saint Bartholomew.

The building was financed by the Deputation of Pontevedra, with the support of the Spanish Ministry of Culture, the Xunta de Galicia and the Pontevedra City Council. The project involved the creation of a new pedestrian street between Padre Amoedo and Arcos de San Bartolomé streets.

The temporary exhibition space was inaugurated in July 2008 with the Art Biennial dedicated to the Maghreb. After the implementation of the museography, the building was inaugurated on 4 January 2013. On 2 December 2021, it was named the Castelao Building, in honour of Alfonso Daniel Rodríguez Castelao, one of the founders of the Pontevedra Museum.,

== Description ==
The building covers an area of 10,000 square metres and consists of three floors and a ground floor. It has 23 permanent exhibition rooms, with mostly pictorial works, which show the evolution of Galician art from the Gothic period to the present day, as well as artistic manifestations from other regions of Spain from the time of Goya to the mid-20th century. Three of the rooms are dedicated to Castelao and there is also ample space for the rich collection of Spanish painting by painters such as Goya, Fortuny, Rusiñol and Vázquez Díaz, and for Galician art with a broad representation of renovators such as Maside, Torres, Souto, Colmeiro and Laxeiro.

The building also has temporary exhibition rooms, an auditorium, a cafeteria and workshop spaces. In addition, on its underground floor, a 50-metre section of the remains of the ancient walls of Pontevedra can be seen, integrated into the building.,

The most remarkable feature of the building is its brightness. It is built around two rectangular structures connected by glass walkways. The interior combines white concrete in the structure with granite floors and bleached wood floors in the rooms. The smaller southern module is glazed to give it lightness and to facilitate the transition to the museum's Sarmiento building, to which it is connected by two glass walkways at mid-height. The northern structure, which is more imposing and airtight, has granite exterior walls and longitudinal glass security panels that allow natural light to enter from the upper part of the rooms and function as zenithal windows.

== Gallery ==
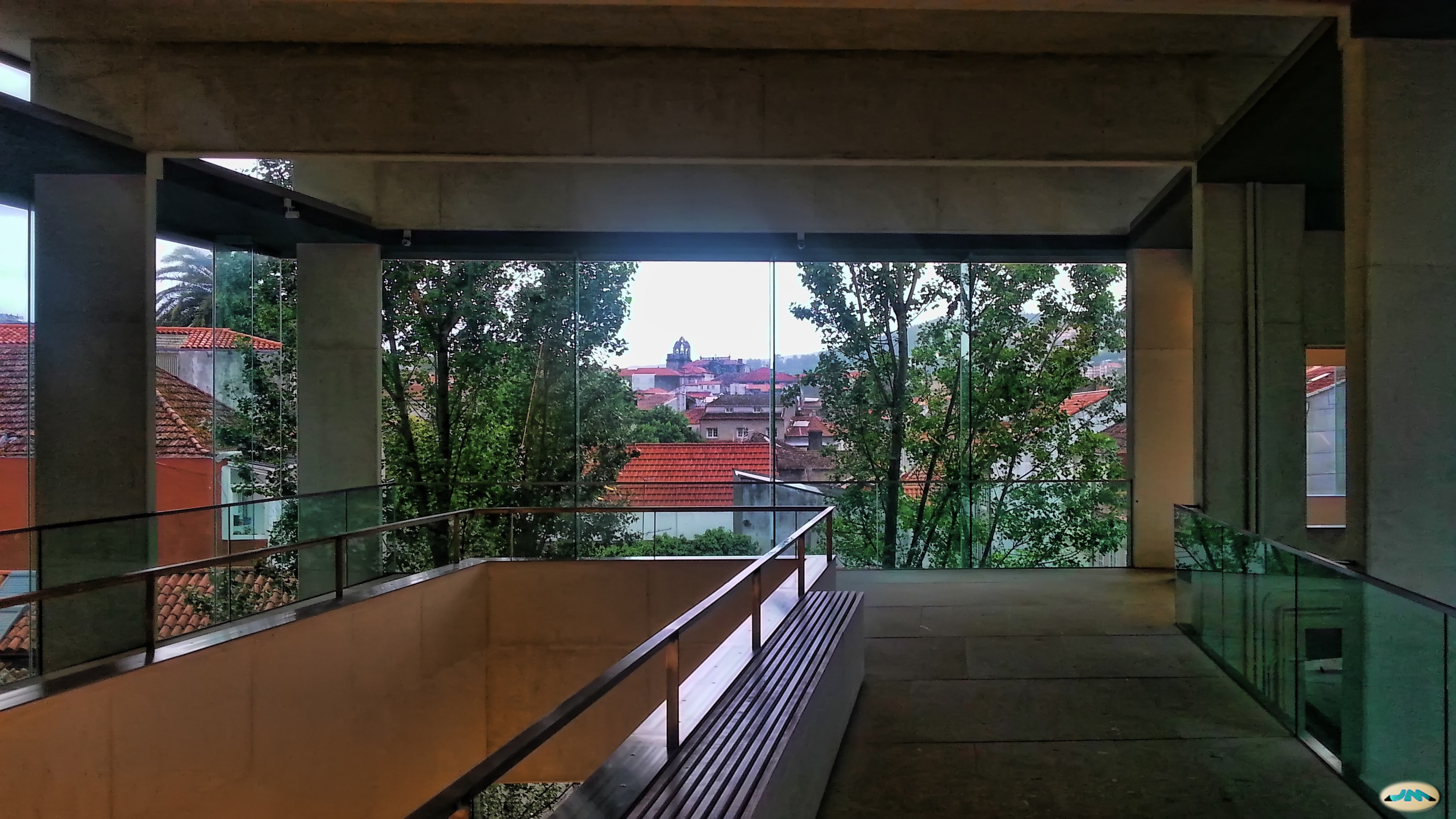
Interior

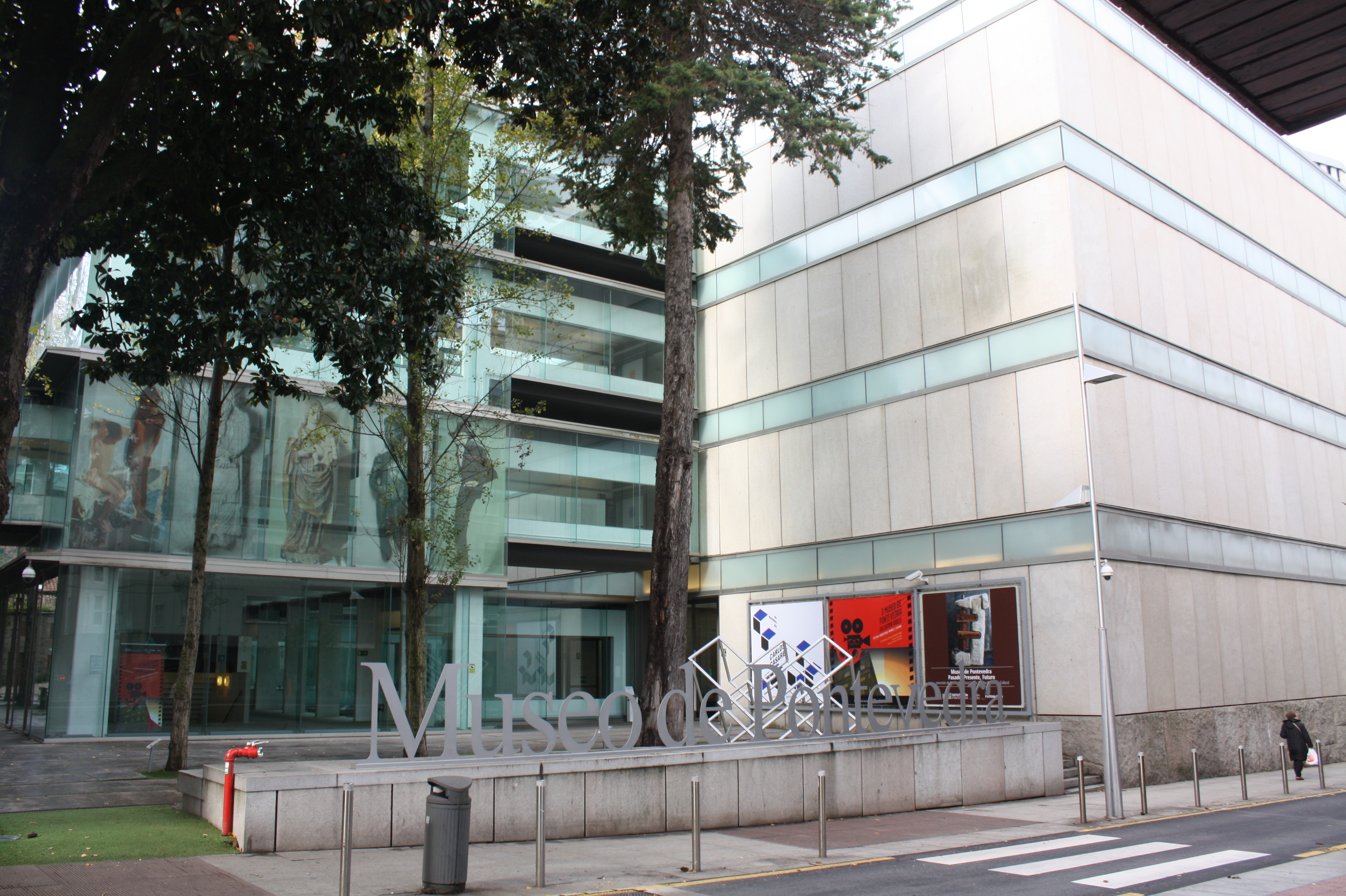
Entrance to the building

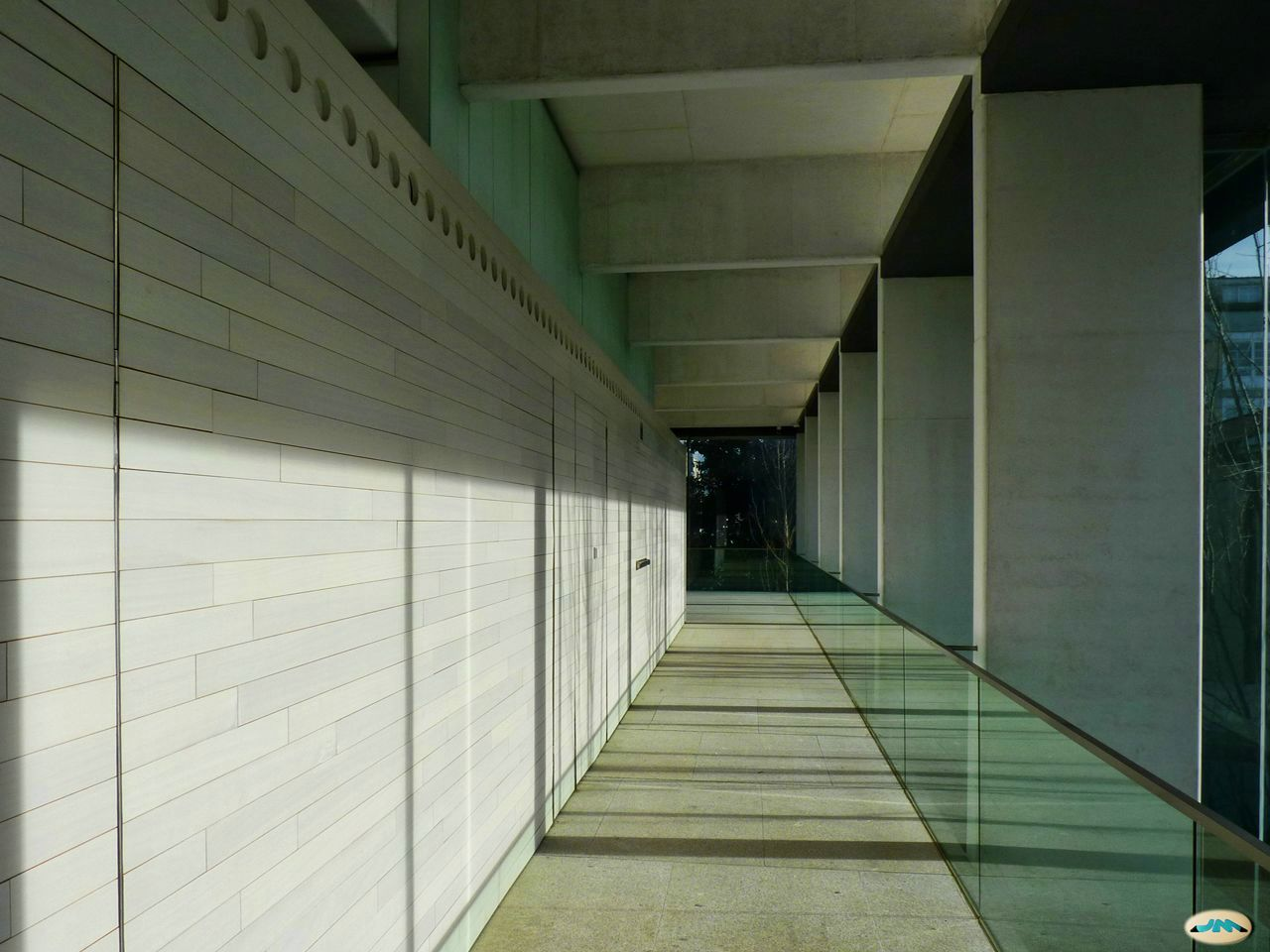
Corridor inside

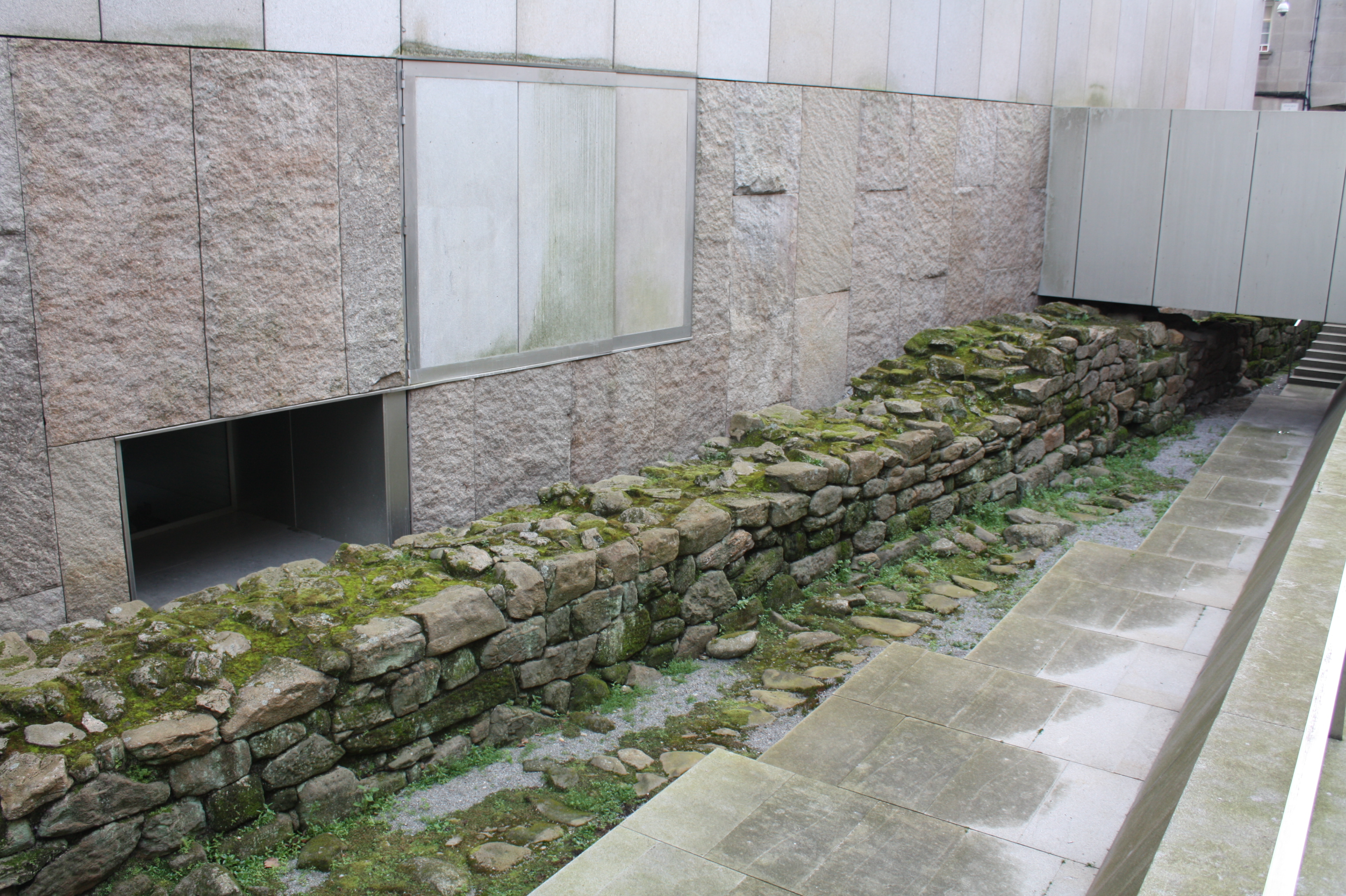
Remains of the ramparts

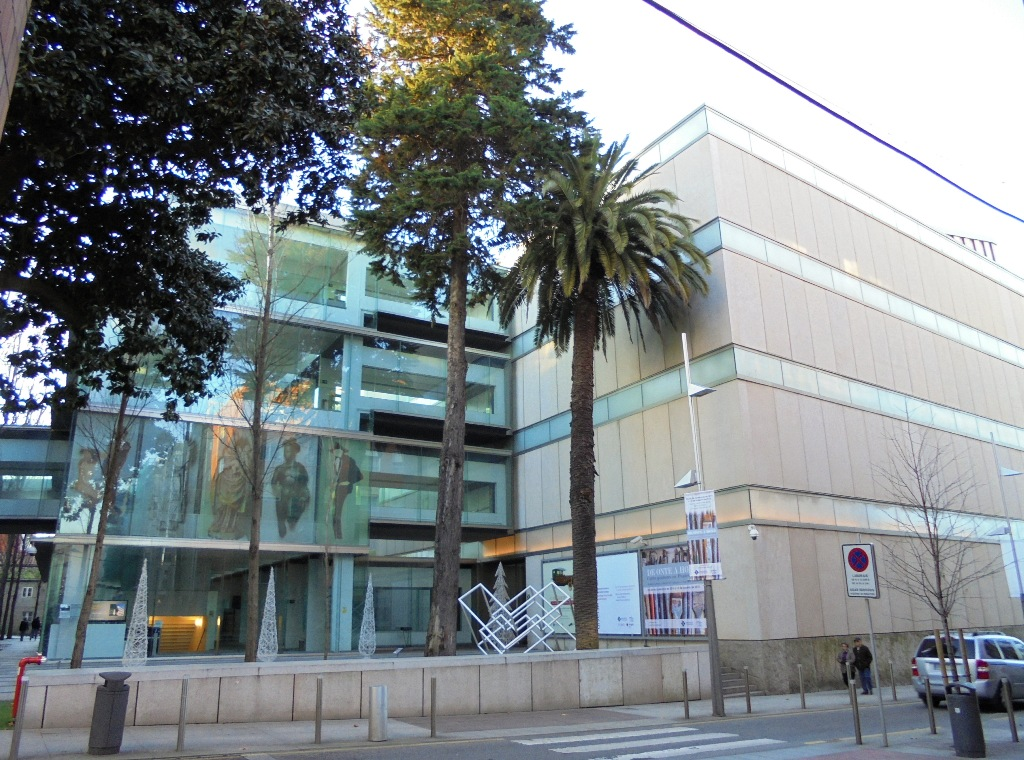
Main facade

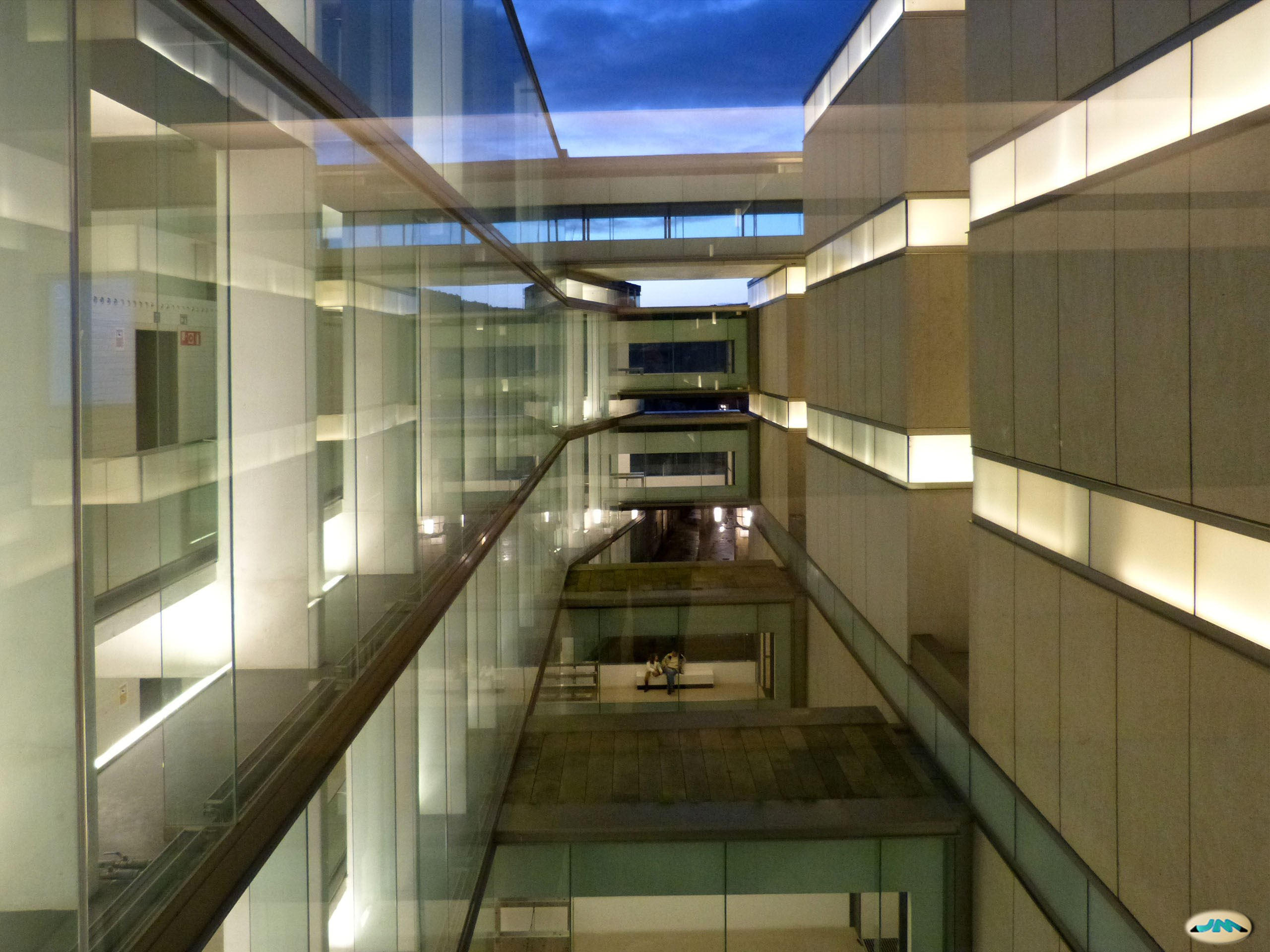
Interior glass walkways

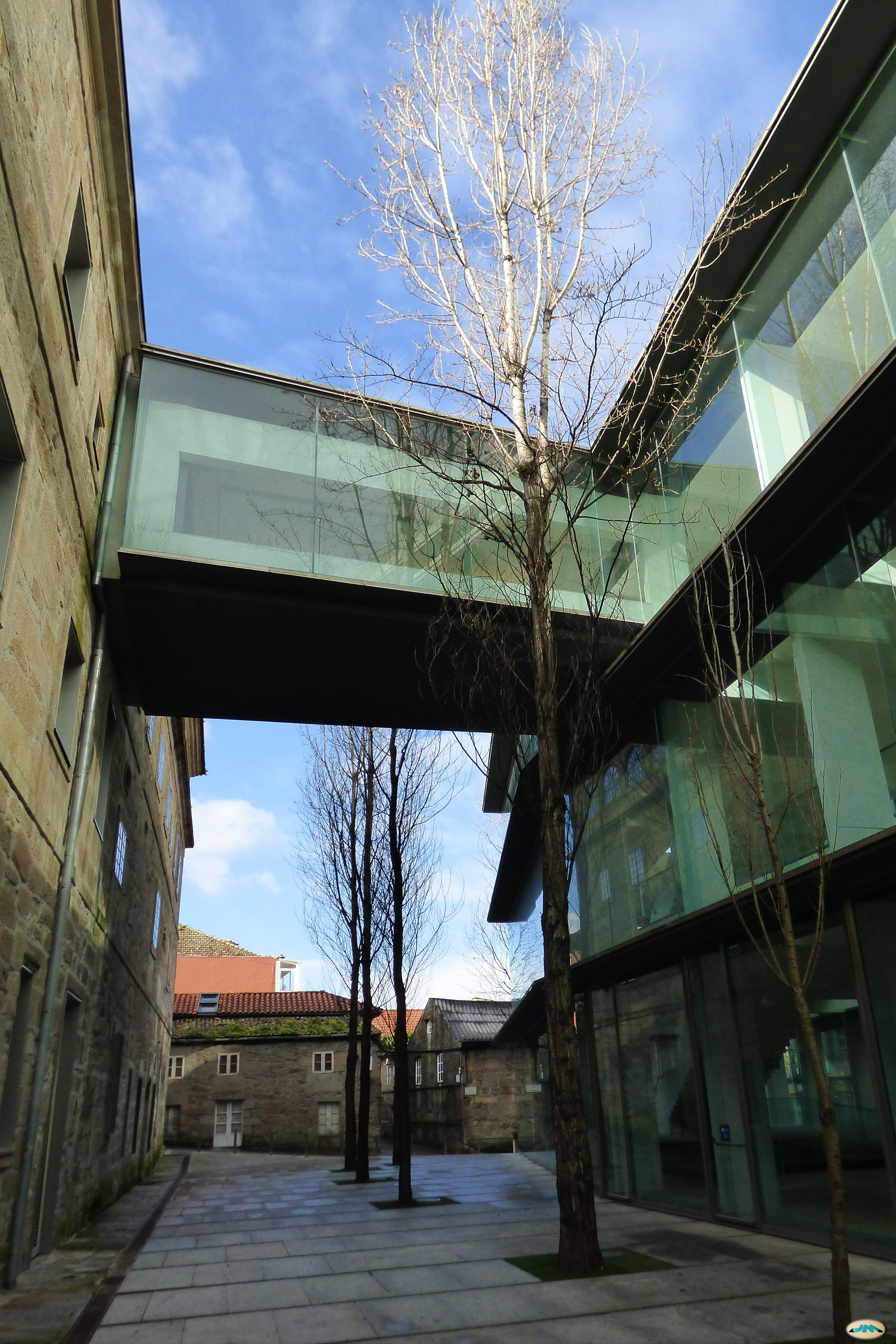
Pedestrian street

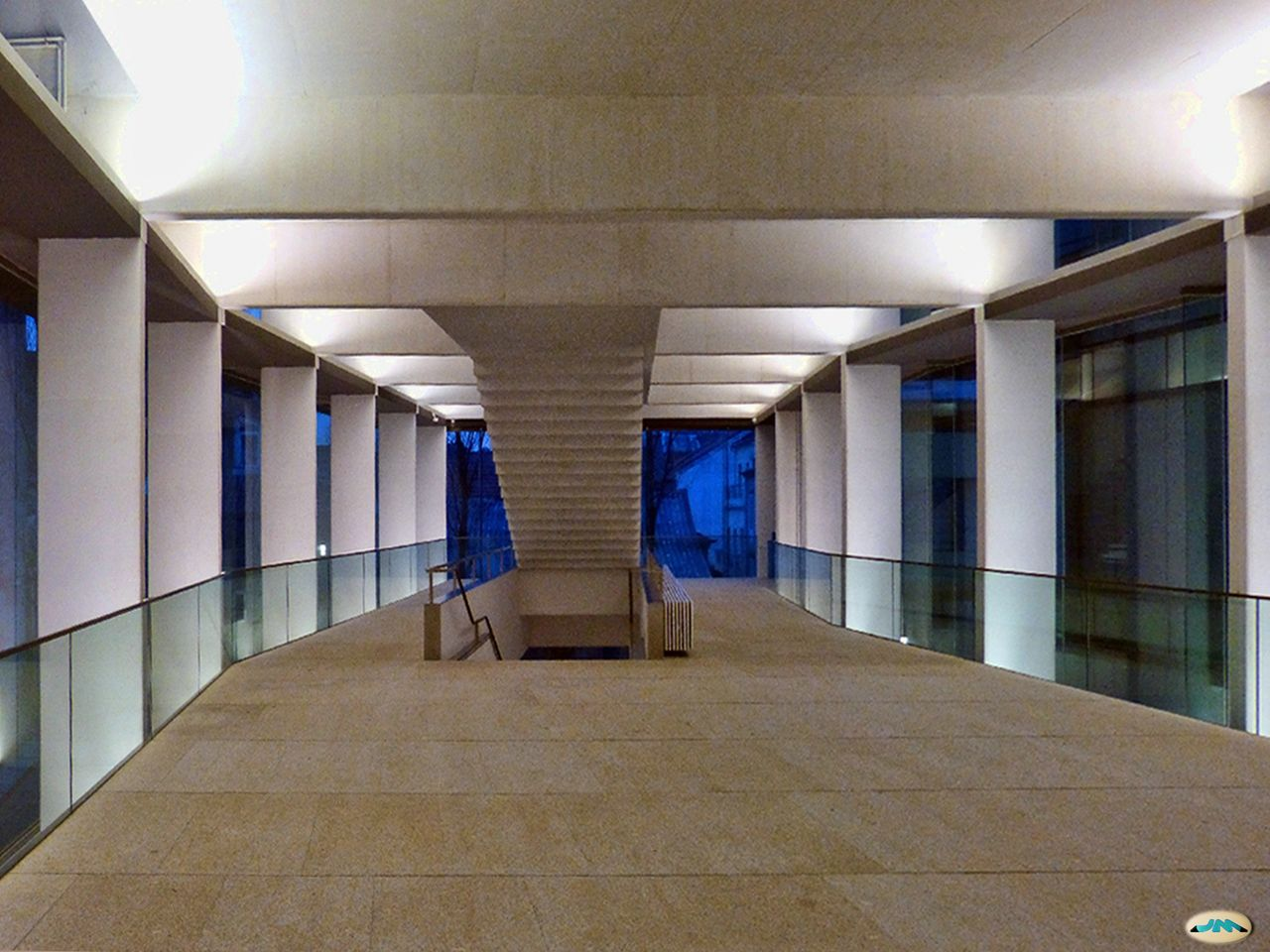
Second floor

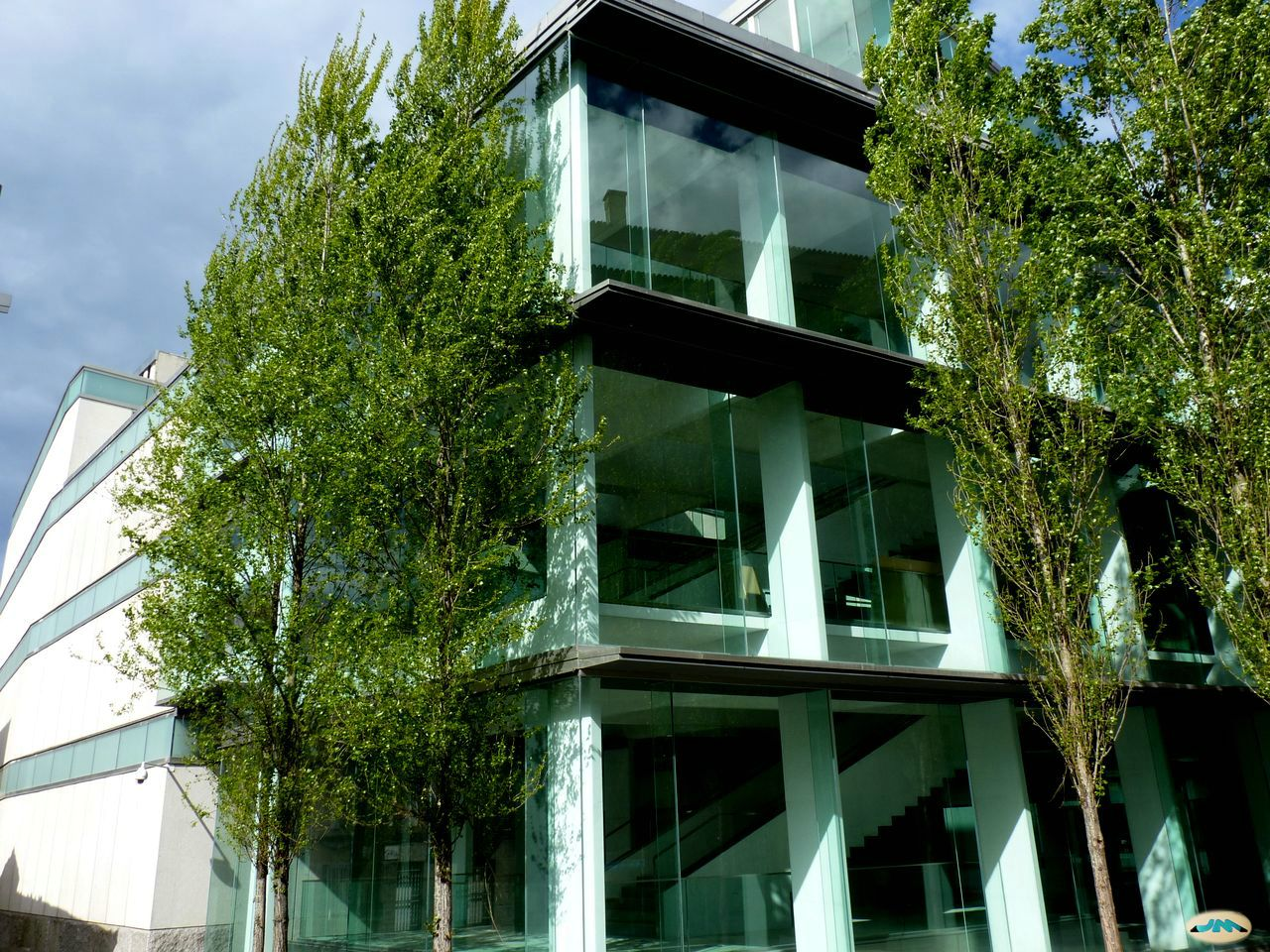
Glass building

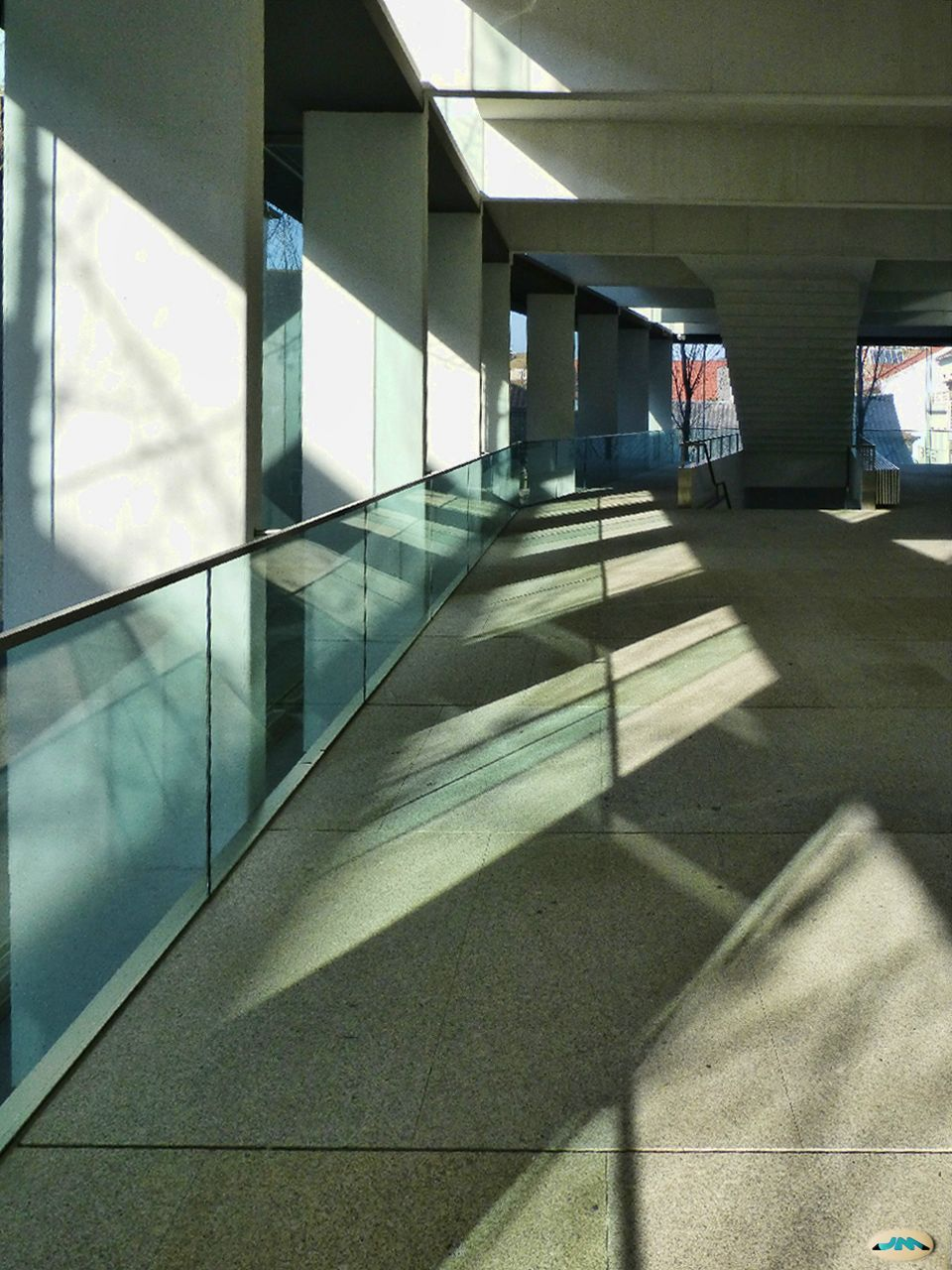
Second floor

== See also ==
=== Bibliography ===
- Aganzo, Carlos (2010). Pontevedra. Ciudades con encanto (in Spanish). Madrid: El País-Aguilar. p. 52. ISBN 978-8403509344.
- Riveiro Tobío, Elvira (2008). Descubrir Pontevedra (in Spanish). Pontevedra: Edicións do Cumio. p. 63. ISBN 9788482890852.
- Varela Campos, María de la Paz (2009). Guía de museos de Galicia (in Spanish). Pontevedra: Edicións Nigra Trea. pp. 99–101. ISBN 978-8495364074.

=== Related articles ===
- Pontevedra Museum

=== External links ===
- Castelao Building of the Pontevedra Museum
- Castelao Building - Contemporary architecture in Pontevedra
