= List of Bienes de Interés Cultural in the Province of Pontevedra =

This is a list of Bien de Interés Cultural landmarks in the Province of Pontevedra, Spain.

- Basilica of Saint Mary Major (Pontevedra)
- Castle of Soutomaior
- Castro of Santa Trega
- Church of the Pilgrim Virgin, Pontevedra
- Convento e Iglesia de San Francisco (Pontevedra)
- Monastery of Santa María de Aciveiro
- Monastery of Carboeiro
- Mosteiro Beneditino de San Bieito de Lérez, Pontevedra
- Royal Monastery of Santa María de Oia
- Ruins of San Domingos, Pontevedra
- Ruínas del Convento de Santo Domingo
- Torres de Oeste
- Tui Cathedral
