= Archiepiscopal Towers Interpretation Centre =

Museum in Pontevedra, Spain

Archiepiscopal Towers Interpretation Centre (CITA)
- Centro de Interpretación de las Torres Arzobispales (CITA)
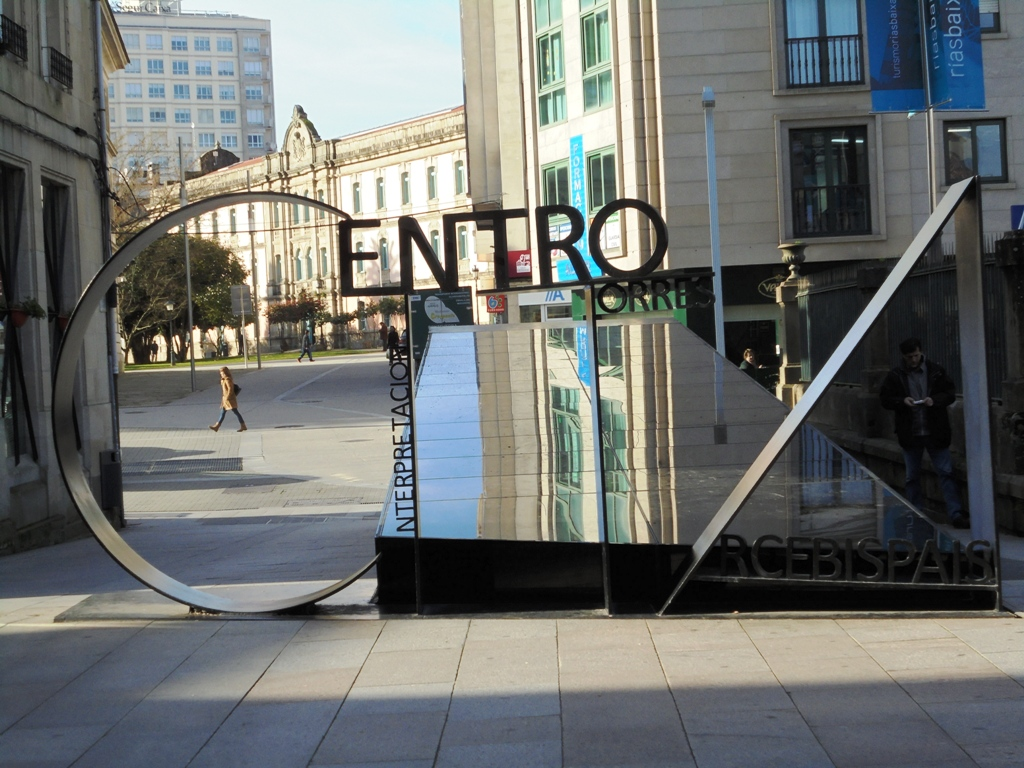
- The CITA entrance
- Established: 13 August 2010; 16 years ago
- Location: Pontevedra, Spain
- Coordinates: 42°25′57″N 8°38′51″W
- Type: Archaeology museum
- Website: cita.pontevedra.gal

The Archiepiscopal Towers Interpretation Centre (CITA) (Centro de Interpretación das Torres Arcebispais (CITA)) is a museum in Pontevedra, Spain created in 2010 in the former moat of the Archiepiscopal Towers fortress-palace in the old town. The museum focuses on the interpretation of what was one of the most important monuments and defensive structures of the city, the Archbishop's Towers, which were part of the Ramparts of Pontevedra.

== History ==
During the archaeological excavations prior to the redevelopment of Santa Maria Avenue, which began in 2008, well-preserved walls were discovered that formed the defensive ditch of the former medieval fortress of the archbishops of Santiago de Compostela, built in the 12th century and demolished at the end of the 19th century.

The city council decided to build an underground museum, as the find was about 5 metres below the current street level. The museum was named CITA and was opened on 13 August 2010.

=== The Archiepiscopal Towers ===
The first buildings date from 1180. Ferdinand II donated the town and the fortress to the Archbishopric of Santiago de Compostela. During the Middle Ages, the number of buildings increased. A large fortress was therefore built facing the sea with a large defensive ditch and its drawbridge on the opposite side.

This fortress was the residence of the archbishops of Santiago de Compostela when they visited Pontevedra and of the kings of Portugal. It consisted of two large towers, one of which was crenellated, and a third body in which large rooms predominated. The archiepiscopal prison was located in its basement.

The fortress suffered its first damage between 1474 and 1477 as a result of the war between Alonso II de Fonseca, archbishop of Santiago de Compostela, and Pedro Álvarez de Sotomayor, better known as Pedro Madruga.

In 1719, the fortress was almost destroyed by the English during their attack on Pontevedra, leaving only the large Homage Tower, which later became the city's prison.

In 1872 and 1873, at a council meeting held to try to open up new spaces in the city, the authorities decided to demolish the ramparts and towers that were still standing. The remains of the archbishop's palace were demolished in 1873.

== Description ==
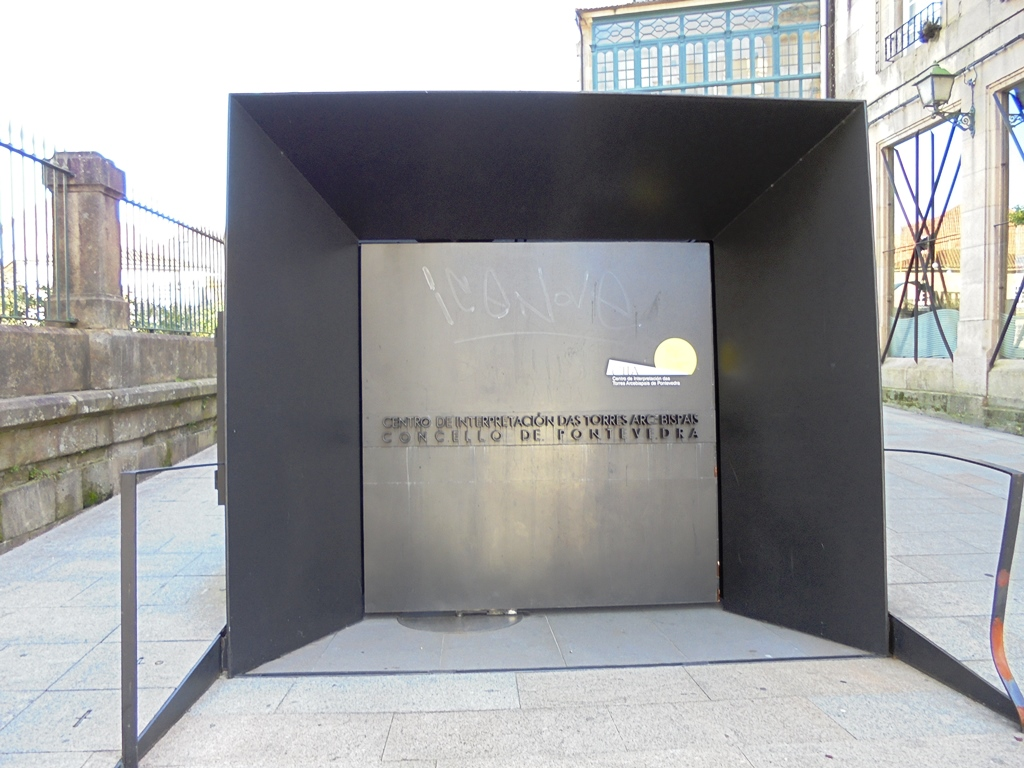
Museum entrance.

The museum is run by the municipality and covers an area of 715 square metres. On the sides of the museum, the inner and outer walls of the fortress are presented in calculated darkness. The structure includes the pillars of a drawbridge for access to the fortress and archaeological remains. The CITA has only one access point above ground, in the form of a glazed metro entrance.

=== Exhibitions ===
The museum is divided into three parts:

At the entrance, touch screens provide information on the medieval and modern fortress of Pontevedra, as well as on the construction of the palace-fortress, which has been reconstructed on a tactile model.

The central part is devoted to the appreciation of the scarp and the counterscarp and the defensive features of the building. This part shows interactive screens with maps of the city and the drawbridge and some catapult stone balls and ceramic pieces found in the excavations. A map of the city in the 15th century is recreated behind which the moat with the scarp of the 16th century palace and the outer counterscarp can be seen, as well as the pillars that supported the 12th century drawbridge.

Finally, a projection showing a three-dimensional audiovisual is projected in the background.

== Bibliography ==
- Nadal, Paco (2012). Rias Baixas. Escapadas (in Spanish). Madrid: El País-Aguilar. p. 39. ISBN 978-8403501089.

== See also ==
=== Related articles ===
- Pontevedra Museum
- List of museums in Spain

=== External links ===
- Museum Official Website
- Rias Baixas Tourism website
- Visit-Pontevedra website
