= Ruins of San Domingos =

Former church and convent in Pontevedra, Spain

- Ruínas de San Domingos (Galician)
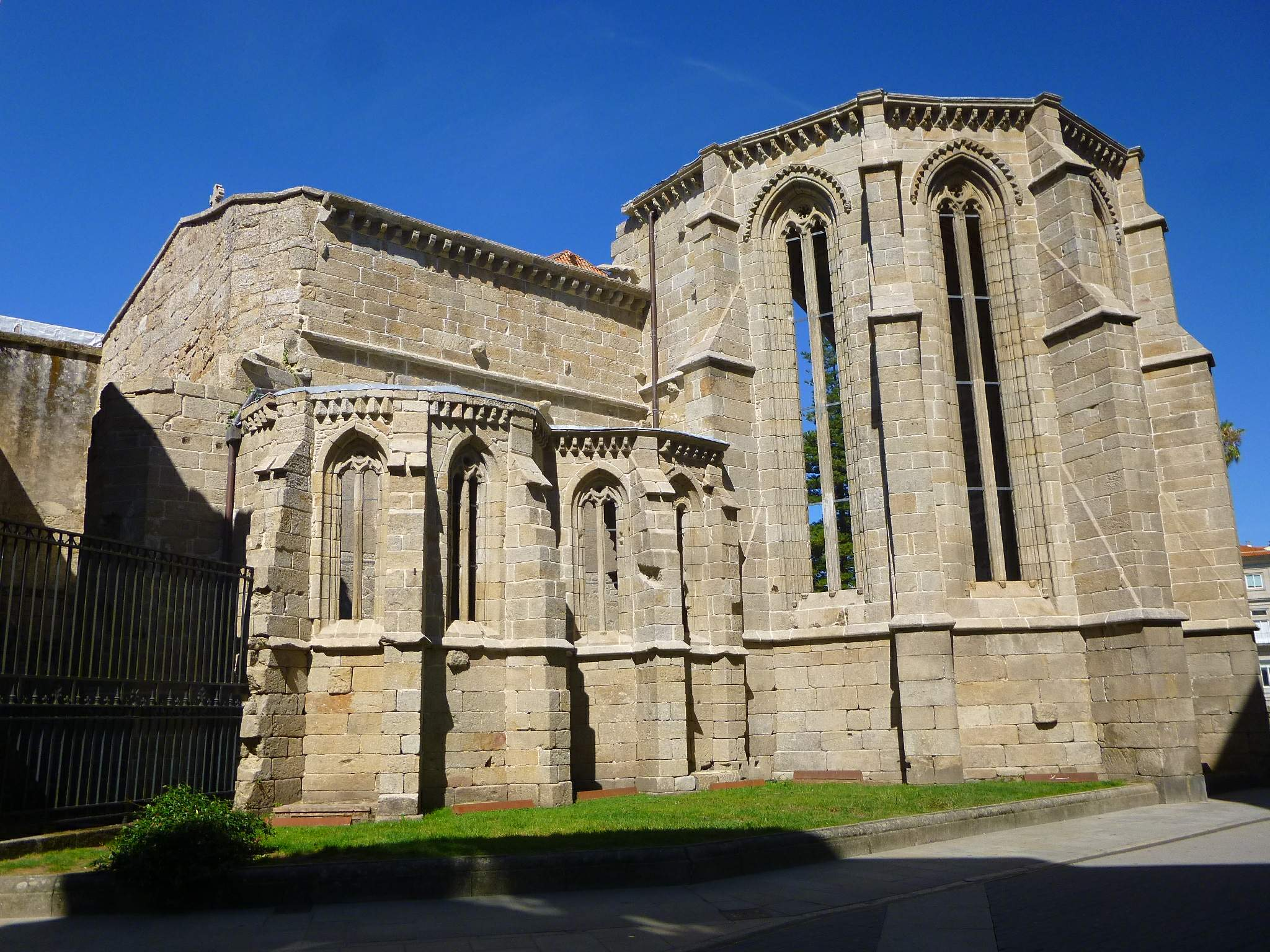

- Location within Spain
- 42.431198°N 8.646964°W
- Location: Pontevedra, Galicia

Spanish Cultural Heritage
- Official name: Ruínas de San Domingos
- Type: Non-movable
- Criteria: Monument
- Designated: 1895
- Reference no.: RI-51-0000070

The ruins of San Domingos (Galician: Ruínas de San Domingos, Spanish Ruinas de Santo Domingo) was a convent located in Pontevedra, Galicia (Spain). It was declared Bien de Interés Cultural in 1895.

== History ==
=== Early years ===
This is the oldest of all Pontevedra Museum’s buildings. The only sections of the original buildings that have been conserved are the main apse, formed by five apses, exceptional in Galician gothic architecture, and part of the south wall of the church and the entrance to the chapter of the Santo Domingo convent, founded in around 1282, although the work on the conserved temple did not begin until 1383, continuing through the 15th century.

=== 1836-1880 ===
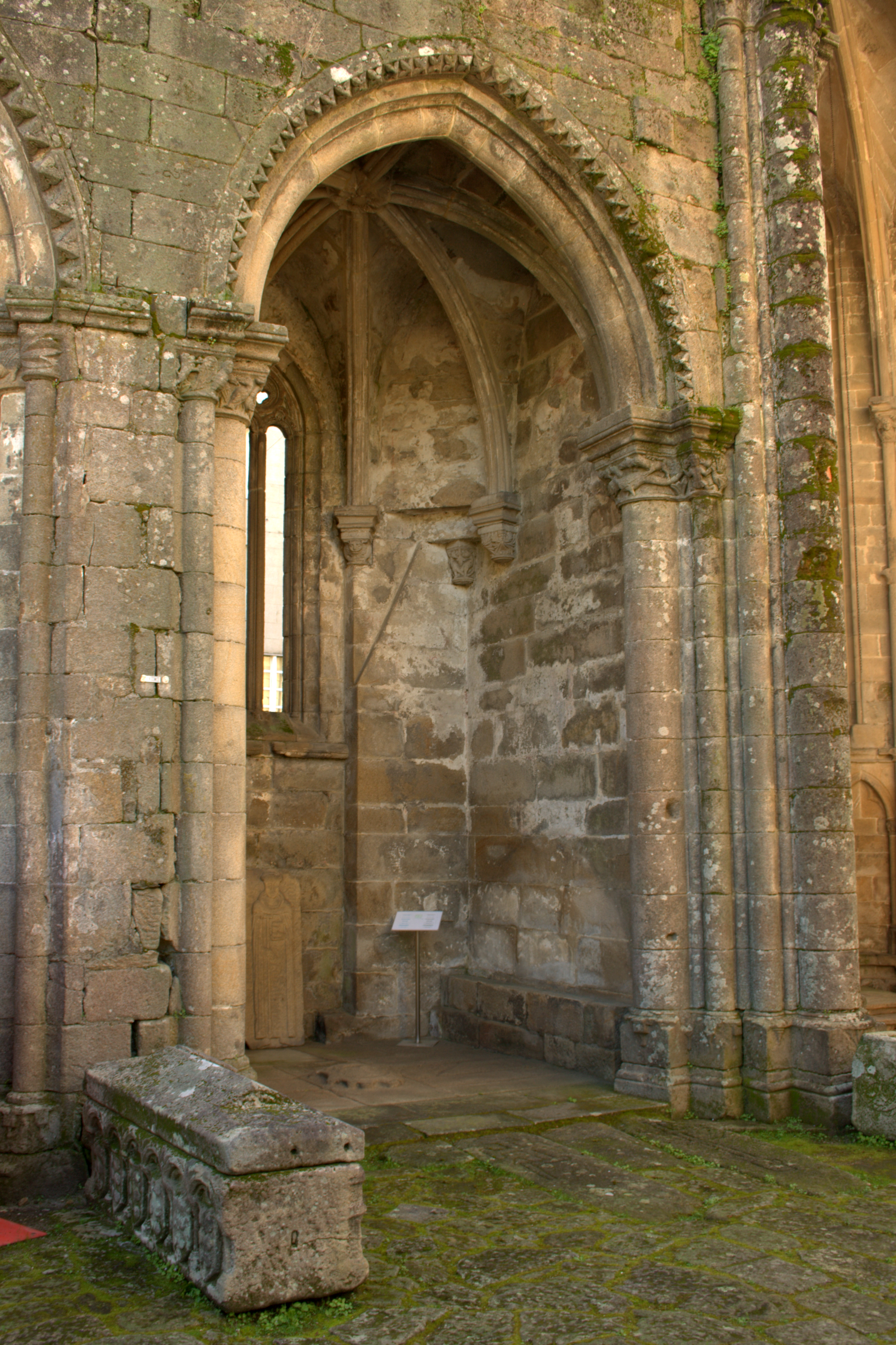

Following the introduction of the exclaustration law, the convent was closed on 8 December 1836 and handed over to the "Junta de Enajenación de Edificios y Efectos de los Conventos Suprimidos de la Provincia de Pontevedra" (body entrusted with the Dissolution and Confiscation of Convents and Convent Property in the Province of Pontevedra), and then handed over as an Asylum to the Town Council, which received the building in May 1840. Despite being occupied successively by a women’s prison, a hospice until 1869, when it was transferred to Santa Clara, an infant school, as well as other activities designated by the Town Council, the building gradually deteriorated until it fell into ruin and by 1846 some of its materials were being used to pave streets. In 1864 a chapel was demolished and between 1869 and 1870 the top part of the tower, located on the south-eastern corner, was torn down.

On 12 March 1874 the Town Council, presided by Fermín Brey, applied for another concession in order to completely demolish the building and extend the property to the plot at the Fair Ground. This concession was approved by the Civil Governor and President of the Provincial Commission of Monuments, but on the condition that the part corresponding to the old church and other elements of interest be conserved.

=== 1880-1947 ===
In July 1880 an agreement was reached to demolish the church completely. This decision prompted José Casal y Lois, a member of the Commission of Monuments, to intervene in October in the name of other illustrious figures from Pontevedra, before the Governor Filiberto Abelardo Díaz, who ordered the Mayor Alejandro Abreu to halt the demolition work. This work continued, however, prompting further reactions. Another attempt was made in 1886 to demolish the ruins, but once again it failed due to pressure from numerous important figures from Pontevedra, and particularly due to the opposition of the Provincial Commission of Monuments.

Saved from demolition, the site was declared a National Monument by the Law of 14 August 1895, which stipulated that the Commission of Monuments would take over control of the building and that the Ministry of Development would implement "the appropriate provisions to ensure its conservation, decoration and custody", exactly one year after the foundation of the Pontevedra Archaeological Society, presided by Casto Sampedro y Folgar, on 15 August 1894. This Society selected the building for the future headquarters of the planned Museum at a meeting held the day before at the president’s office. The choice was made from three buildings forming the cloister of San Francisco and the ground floor of the Colegio de la Compañía, today the "Sarmiento" building.

In 1903, when work had begun on the Institute occupying part of the Ruins, the Archaeological Society requested premises on the ground floor of the Institute to house the collections that would be exhibited in the second section of the Museum, located on a premises belonging to the Provincial Government. The Society was awarded a concession to use these premises in 1905, although it only received one room once construction had been completed and this was exchanged for a small patio in 1945, where the decorative arches of the chapter room of the old convent were built, donated by the heirs of Augusto González Besada, and for part of the basement then used to exhibit the epigraphy collection. This work concluded in 1947.

== Gallery ==
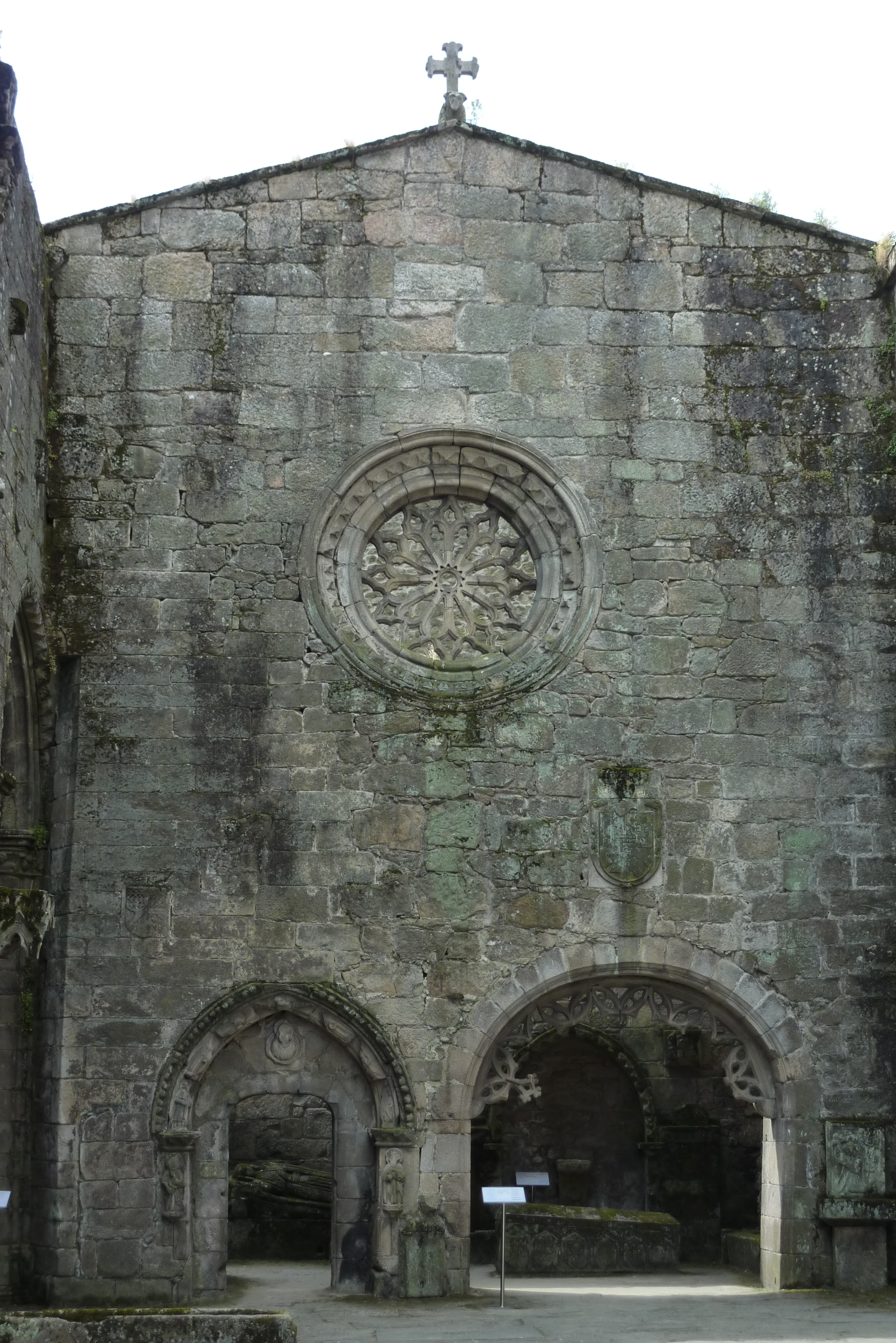

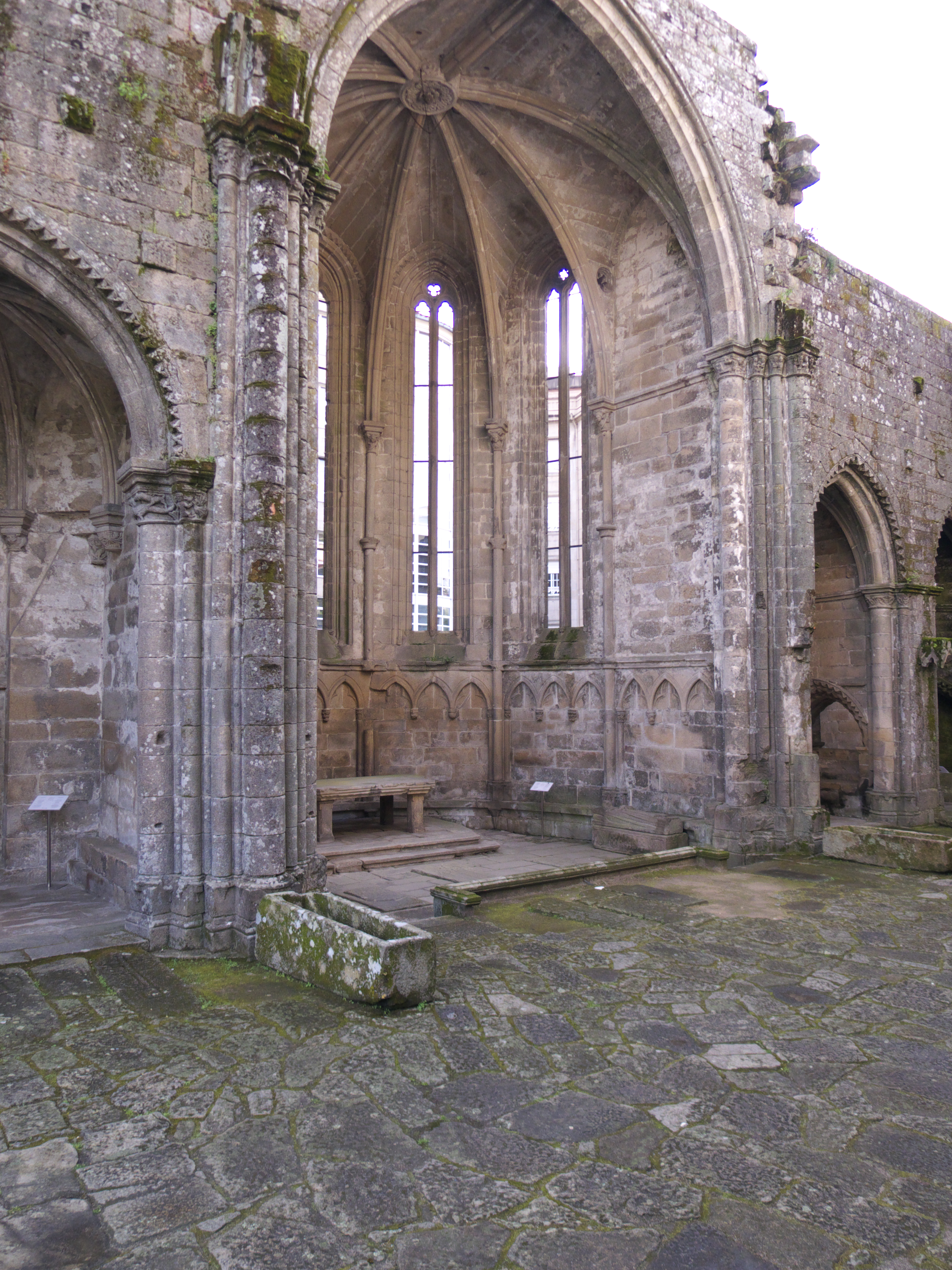

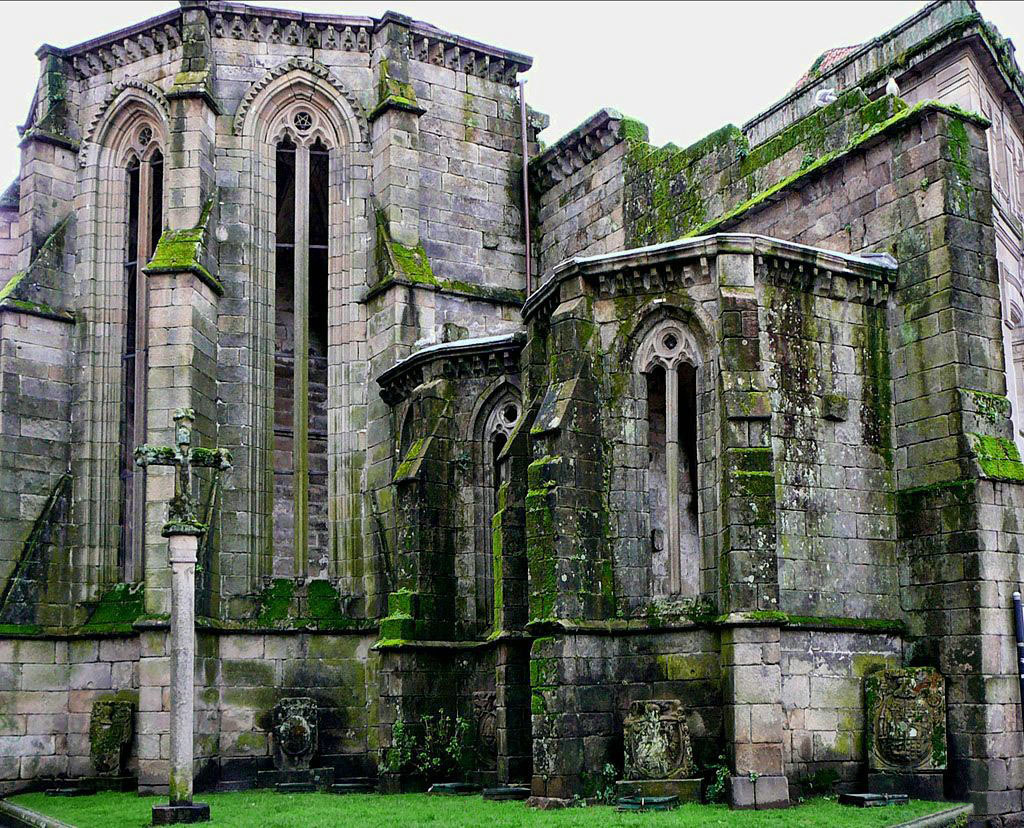

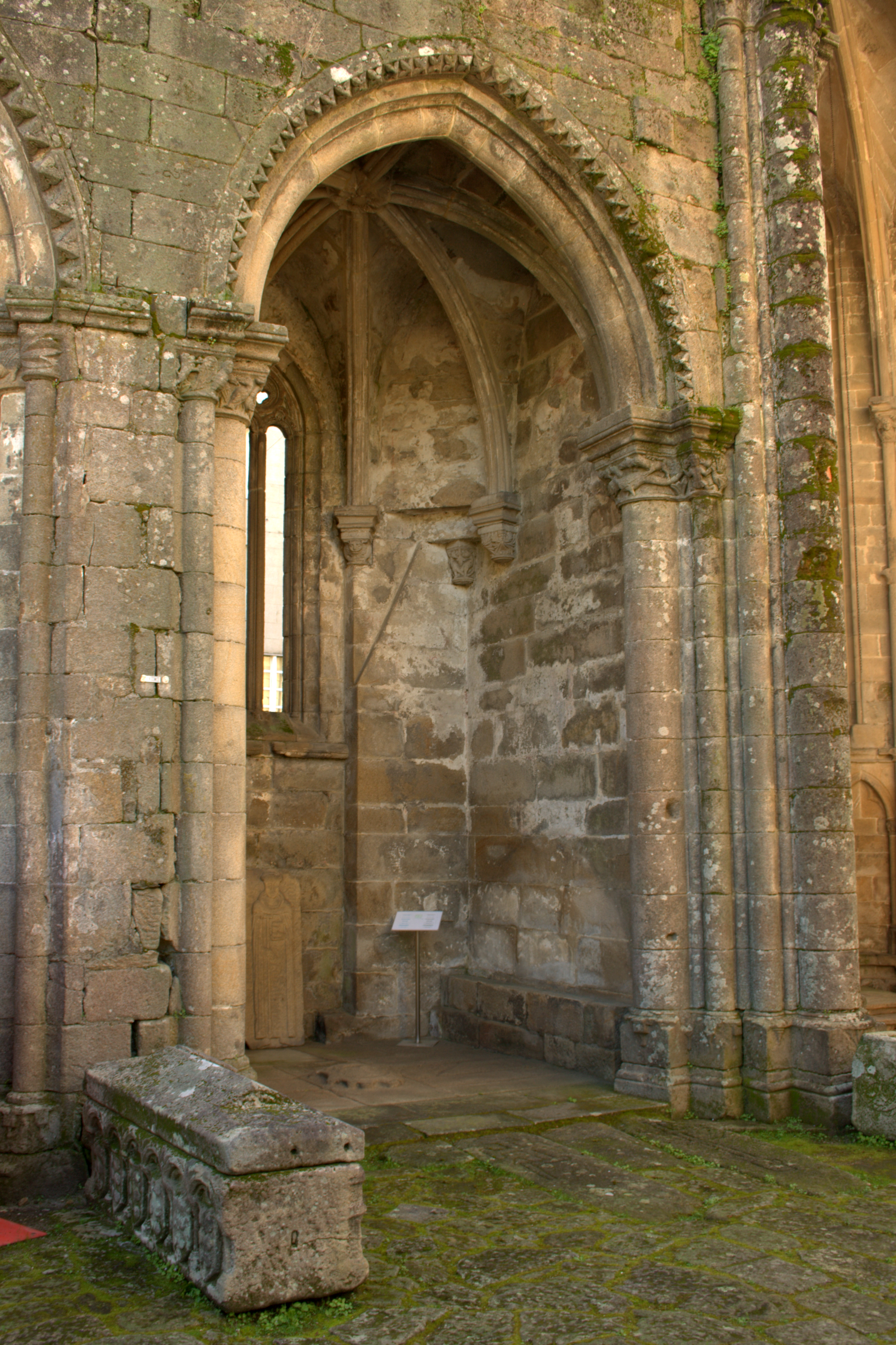

== See also ==
- List of Bien de Interés Cultural in the Province of Pontevedra
- Gran Vía de Montero Ríos
