= Nazarene Chapel =

Baroque chapel in Pontevedra, Spain

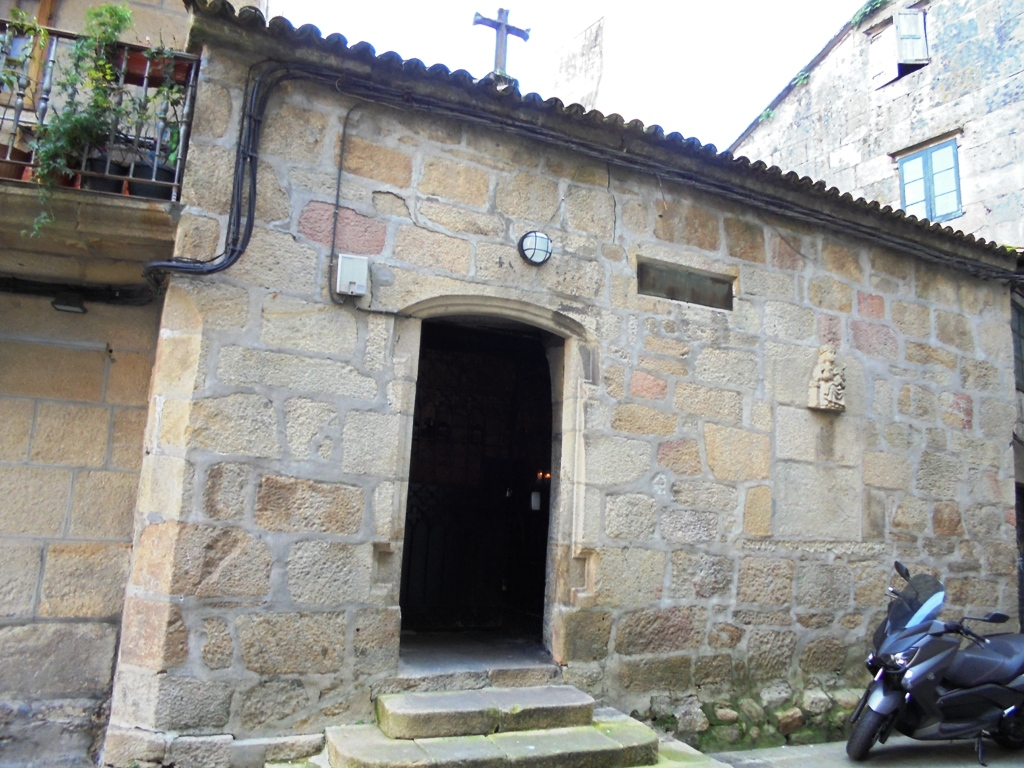
- Facade of the chapel
- Nazarene Chapel
- 42°25′57″N 8°38′46″W
- Location: Pontevedra, Spain
- Country: Spain
- Denomination: Catholicism

Architecture
- Groundbreaking: 14th century
- Completed: 18th century

Administration
- Diocese: Roman Catholic Archdiocese of Santiago de Compostela

The Chapel of the Nazarene is a Catholic religious building, with the status of chapel, located in the old town of Pontevedra (Spain), in Duque de Tetuán Street, opposite the Principal Theatre.

== History ==
The chapel has its origins in the 14th century. It is believed that it belonged to the parish church of Saint Bartholomew the Elder, which was located in this place, occupying the space of the current Principal Theatre. Another theory is that it may have belonged to the Mendiño family's pazo, as the medieval tower was located right next to it. The large ashlars of the old tower can still be seen in this building today. On the other side of the chapel there was once a street, now walled in by a house with a balcony.

The chapel that originally existed in this place was called the Chapel of the Emparedadas (Chapel of the Walled Women). It was so called because pious women were locked up there and after entering, they sealed the door with walls, except for a small slit through which the sacraments and food were administered. According to Xosé Filgueira Valverde, this street was already known as the Emparedadas Street in the mid-13th century.

The cult of Jesus of Nazareth has more than 100 years of history in Pontevedra. It is not known exactly when it began, but at the beginning of the 20th century, the street Duque de Tetuán where the chapel is located was called Jesús Nazareno Street and the chapel was already attracting thousands of devotees.

== Description ==
The chapel, which is believed to have been the former sacristy of the former temple of St Bartholomew the Elder, was mentioned several times in the late Middle Ages as a small building with a small stone image of the Virgin Mary embedded in its façade.

It is a small chapel and is attached to other buildings by the end walls. The walls are made of cut granite stones and the roof is made of wood and Galician tiles. The entrance door, located on the south side, has a segmental arch. Later, upper and lower mouldings were carved to adapt it to the Baroque style, as the chapel is of medieval origin. Next to the door there is an embrasure. The chapel has a small stone image of the Virgin embedded in its façade.

The chapel is very popular and is often visited on the day of the Nazarene to ask for the three graces: health, work and love. The first Friday in March is the only day the chapel is open. The rest of the year, it is only possible to invoke the Nazarene from the outside, through the barred door.

Inside is a three-section Baroque altarpiece, with the image of Jesus the Nazarene in the centre and two images of the Virgin and Child on the sides. There is also an image of the Our Lady of Sorrows. The image of the Nazarene to whose worship it is dedicated comes from Madrid.

The convents of St. Francis and St. Clare in the city also preserve images of the Nazarene that are venerated in Pontevedra.

== See also ==
=== Bibliography ===
- Aganzo, Carlos (2010). Pontevedra. Ciudades con encanto (in Spanish). Madrid: El País-Aguilar. p. 70. ISBN 978-84-03-50934-4.
- Fontoira Surís, Rafael (2009). Pontevedra monumental (in Galician). Pontevedra: Diputación de Pontevedra. p. 288. ISBN 978-84-8457-327-2.
- Riveiro Tobío, Elvira (2008). Descubrir Pontevedra (in Spanish). Pontevedra: Edicións do Cumio. p. 28. ISBN 9788482890852.

=== Related articles ===
- Baroque architecture
- Jesus
- Chapel of Saint Roch

=== External links ===
- Nazarene Chapel on the website Rías Baixas Tourism
- Nazarene Chapel on the website Cityplan
