= Saint Clare's Convent (Pontevedra) =

Gothic convent and church in Pontevedra, Spain

Former Saint Clare's Convent
- Antiguo Convento de Santa Clara
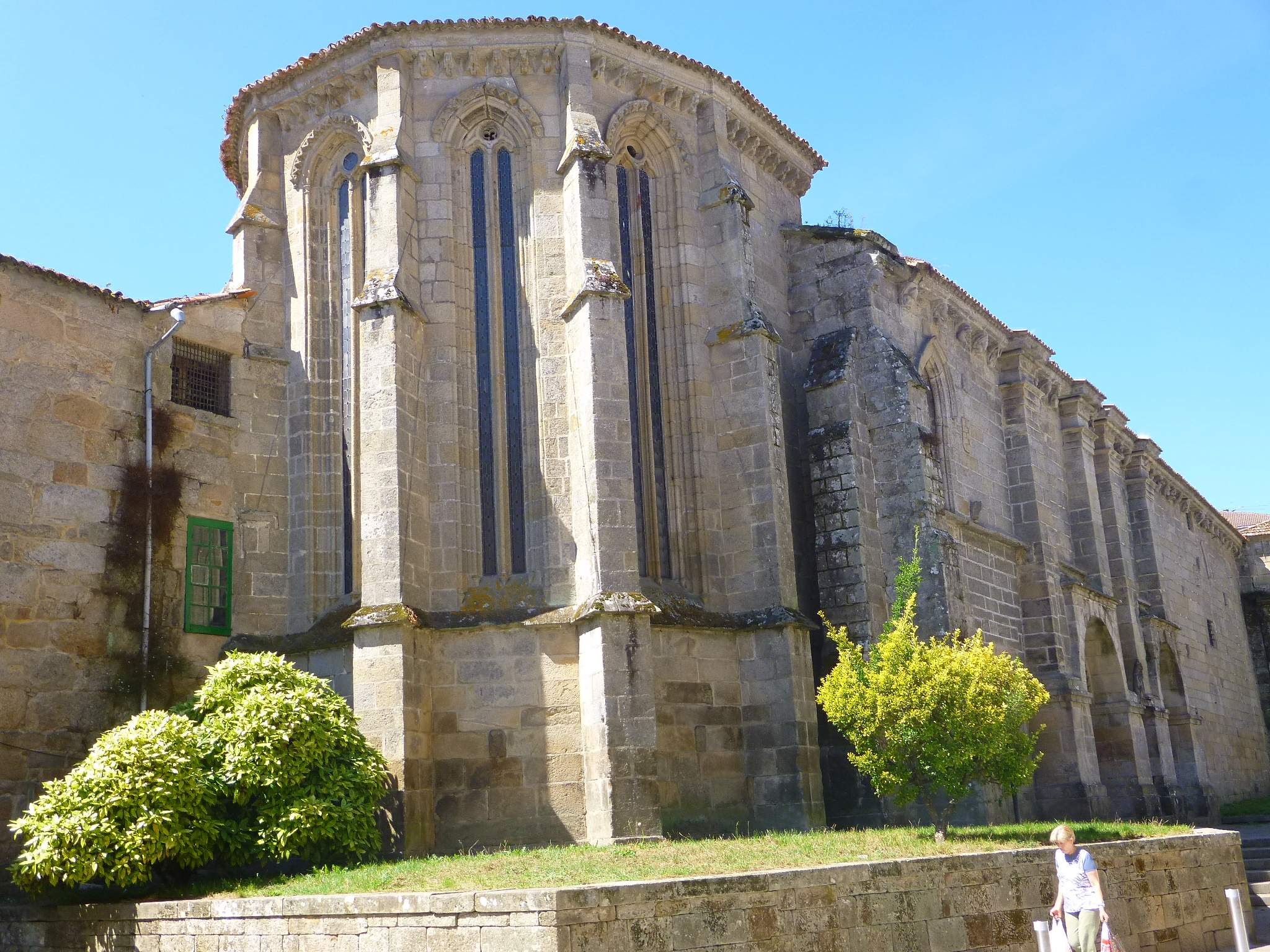
- The apse of the church
- Interactive map of the Former Saint Clare's Convent area

General information
- Type: Church and Convent
- Architectural style: Gothic
- Location: Pontevedra, Spain
- Current tenants: Pontevedra Museum
- Groundbreaking: 1271

Website
- museo.depo.gal/en/

The Convent of St. Clare (Spanish: Convento de Santa Clara) is a former cloistered convent of the Order of Poor Clares, located in the city centre of Pontevedra, Spain, precisely in Santa Clara Street, near the disappeared St. Clare Gate of the medieval city walls. Founded in 1271, the convent closed in 2017. In 2021 the City Council bought the building from the Order, and in 2023 it transferred it to the Provincial Deputation to become part of the Pontevedra Museum.

== History ==
According to tradition, a convent of the Knights Templar had previously been built on this site. The current convent was founded in 1271 and its construction, which began in 1339, was influenced by the interest of Doña Teresa Pérez de Sotomayor, daughter of the poet and aristocrat Pay Gómez Chariño. The first documented reference to a community of nuns under the invocation of St Clare dates from 1293. The construction of the church was extended over the centuries. In fact, the chevet had not yet been completed in 1362.

Thanks to numerous private donations, the church was enlarged in the 14th and 15th centuries. The convent was also extended and became a favourite retreat for unmarried noble daughters. In the 16th and 17th centuries, additions, modifications and extensions were made to the convent. Over the centuries, the convent has seen various vicissitudes. In 1702, after the defeat of the Spanish fleet in the Battle of Rande, the cloistered nuns had to leave the convent and take refuge in Cotobade. In 1719, they had to go to Santiago de Compostela, fleeing the English invasion led by General Homobod, which razed the town to the ground and burnt down its most important buildings. Later, during the Spanish War of Independence against the French, they had to flee for eight months, and on their return the convent had been looted and part of it burned. After the Spanish confiscation, they had to leave the convent in 1868. At that time, the convent was occupied by the children of the hospice, until it was returned to the nuns on 1 October 1875, thanks to negotiations between the archbishop of Santiago de Compostela, Miguel Payá y Rico, and King Alfonso XII.

This emblematic building has been part of the Galician cultural heritage catalogue since 1994. The convent was closed on 25 September 2017 due to the lack of religious vocations and the advanced age of the few nuns still residing there.

On 1 December 2021, the City Council of Pontevedra bought the convent from the Poor Clares for €3.2 million and it became municipal property. On 3 January 2023, the City Council transferred the complex to the Provincial Deputation retaining the right of public use of the gardens and the forest. The Deputation will integrate the convent into the Pontevedra Museum as its seventh building after a comprehensive restoration. On 3 January 2023 the Pontevedra City Council officially ceded the property of the convent to the Pontevedra Provincial Council so that it could become part of the Pontevedra Museum as the institution's seventh building.

On 9 June 2023, the architects Nieto & Sobejano's preliminary design for the restoration of the convent as the home of the museum was selected. The highlights of the project are a subtle enclosure of the cloister, a reception area under a large canopy in the middle of the estate and the creation of a three-storey, semi-buried archaeological area on the east side. The reception area in the middle of the estate will be transformed into a belvedere overlooking the cloister, making it possible to organise all the circulation and distribution of uses, as well as the organisation of the spaces.

== Description ==
The church dates mainly from the 14th century. The construction follows the Gothic model of the church of St. Francis, although it is simpler. It has a single large rectangular nave without a transept and a polygonal apse, and is covered with a fan vault. It has three large windows in the interior and there are important Baroque altarpieces. The main altar dates from 1730 in the Churrigueresque Baroque style. Also from the 18th century are the two neoclassical side altarpieces. There is another baroque altarpiece with the image of the Virgen de los Desamparados. The interior of the church also has an organ from 1795 and a reliquary of San Vicente Mártir at the foot of the main altar. The church combines Romanesque imagery in its corbels with an ogival Gothic style in its architecture.

On the outside, renovated during the Baroque period, the only thing that can be seen is the two-door Gospel wall, in which the Gothic carved door, dating from the last quarter of the 14th century, shows the theme of the Last Judgement. In the archivolts can be seen the bust of Christ the Judge showing his wounds, Saint Peter with the keys or an angel playing the trumpet, among other figures. The building adjacent to the convent was built in 1880 to serve as the summer residence of the archbishop, Cardinal Quiroga Palacios.

The convent has a cloister, with a garden in the shape of a cross, a calvary and a fountain in the style of the one in Herrería Square. At the back of the convent there is a large garden of 12,000 square metres (130,000 sq ft), whose enclosure wall overlooks the Barcelos Square. In the exterior chapel located in the garden there is a 15th-century polychrome tympanum depicting the Virgin and child flanked by Saint Clare and Saint Francis.

The cloister has only two sides. In the centre there is a stone fountain crowned by the figure of St Clare, carrying an olive branch and a host. The convent also has an orchard and a garden dominated by apple, plum, hazelnut and chestnut trees. In the centre of the garden is the small Chapel of the Angels

== In popular culture ==
The bride and groom would come to the convent to bring eggs and other offerings to try to secure the sun on their wedding day.

== Gallery ==
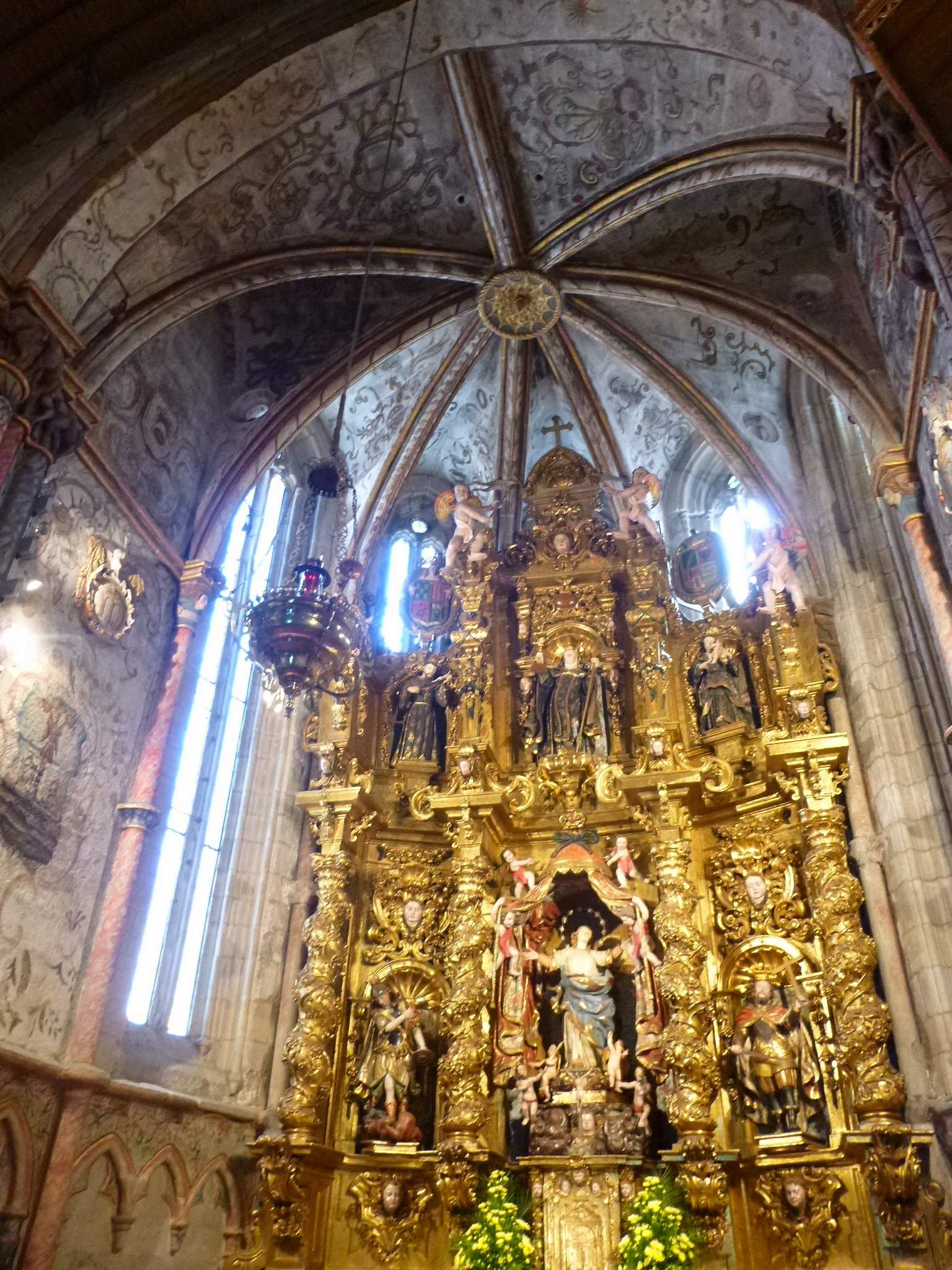
Altarpiece at the high altar

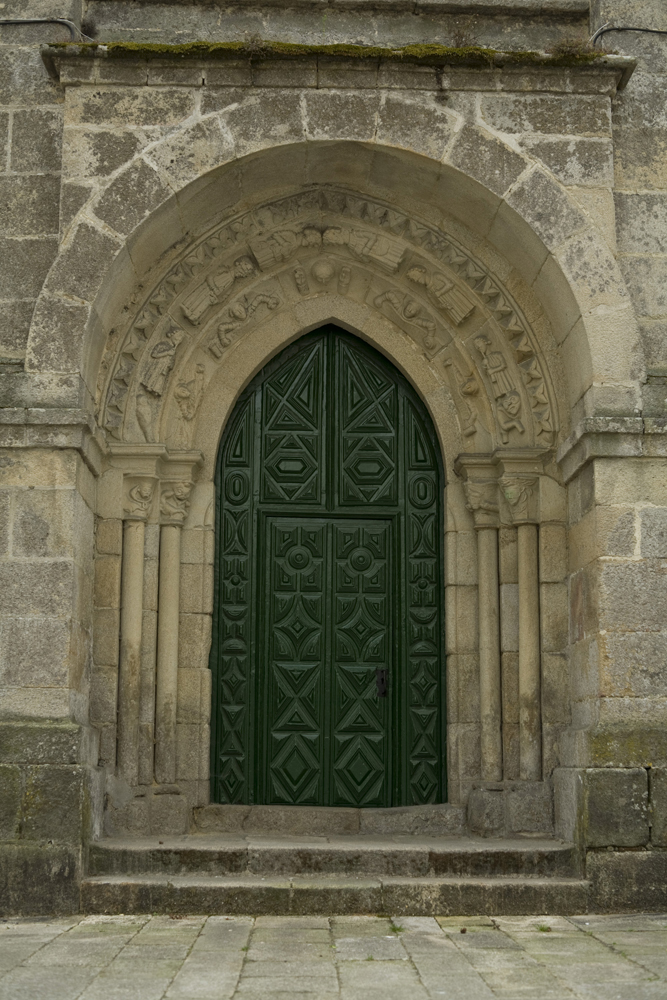

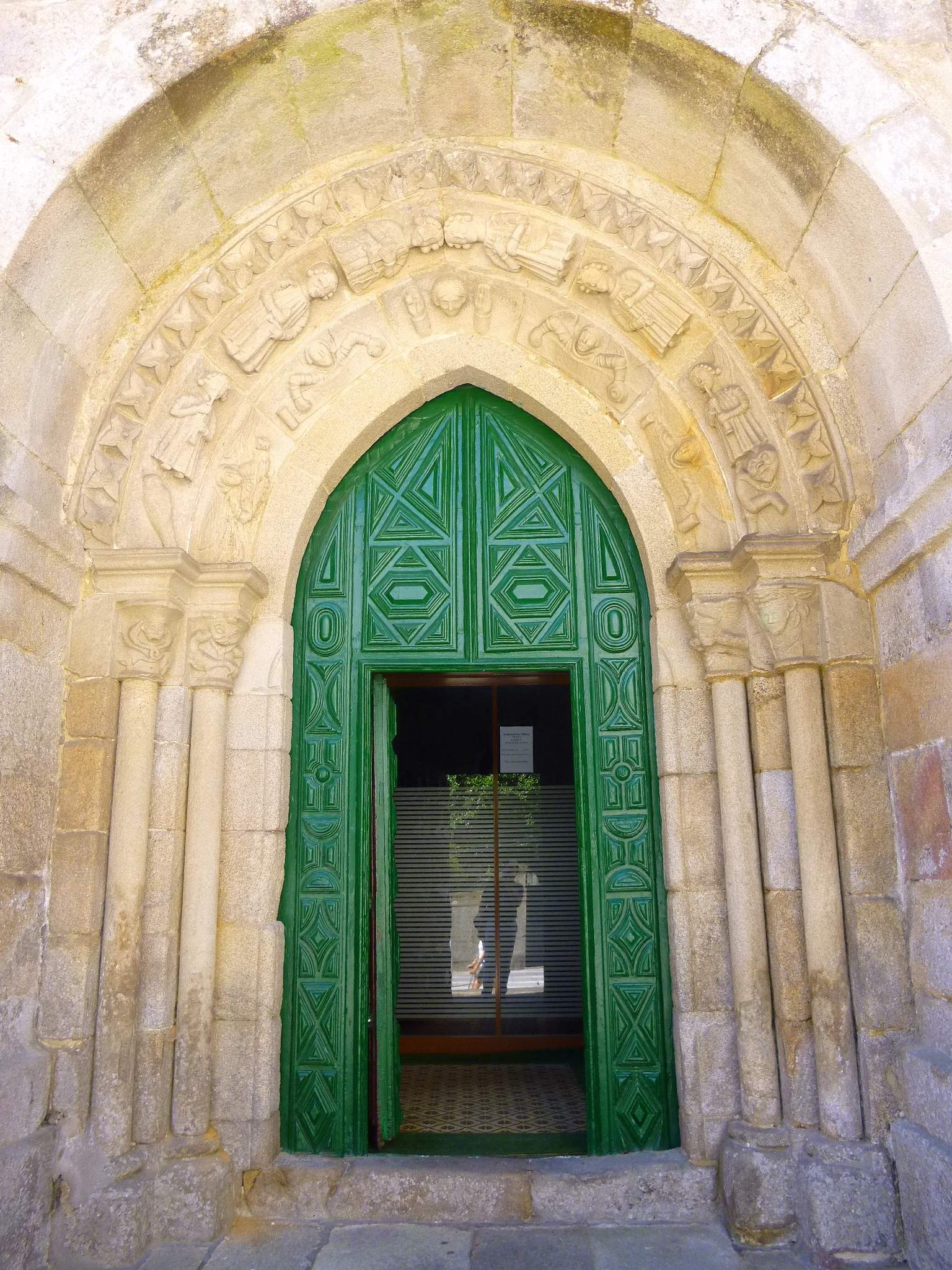
Portal

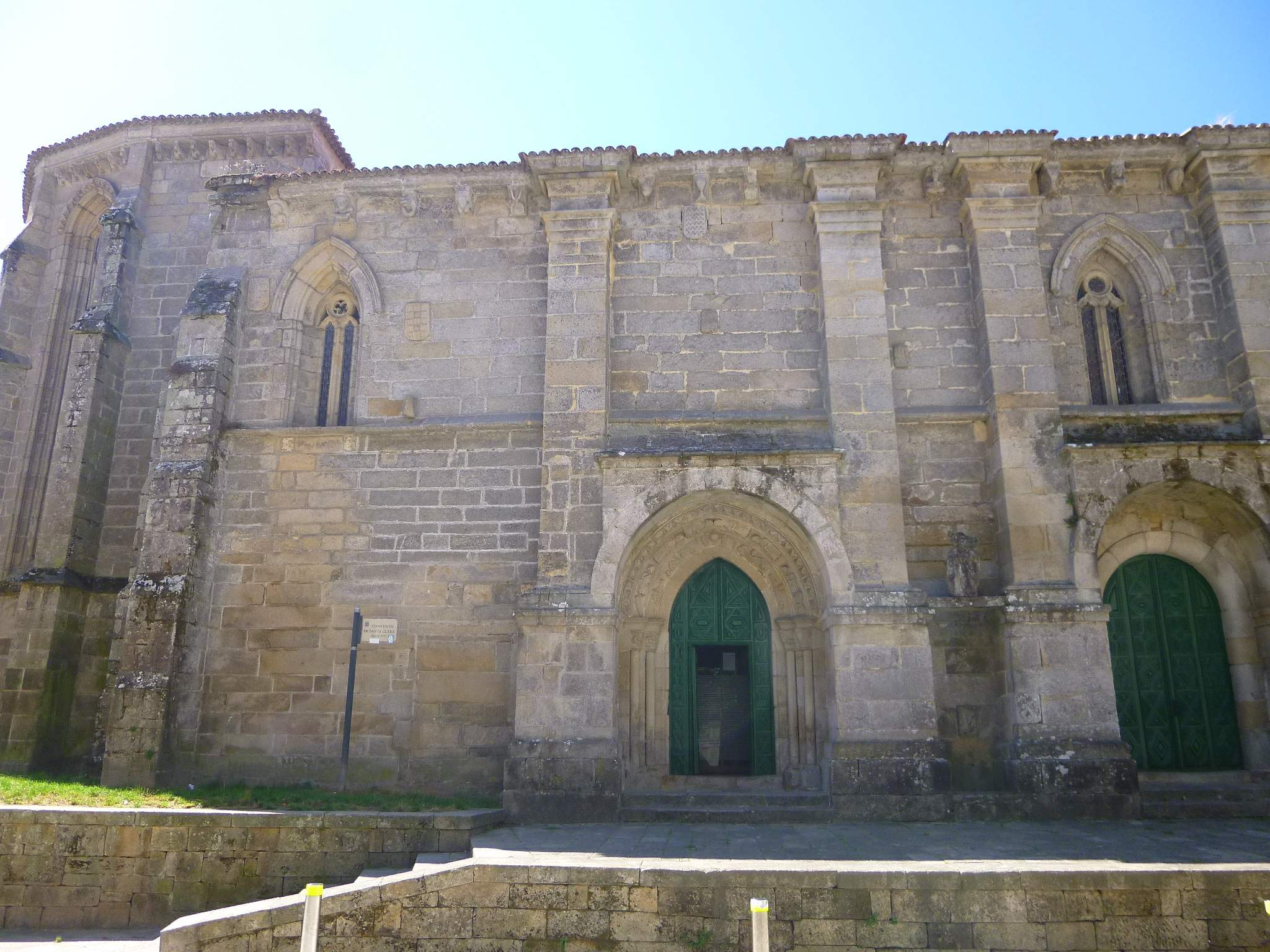

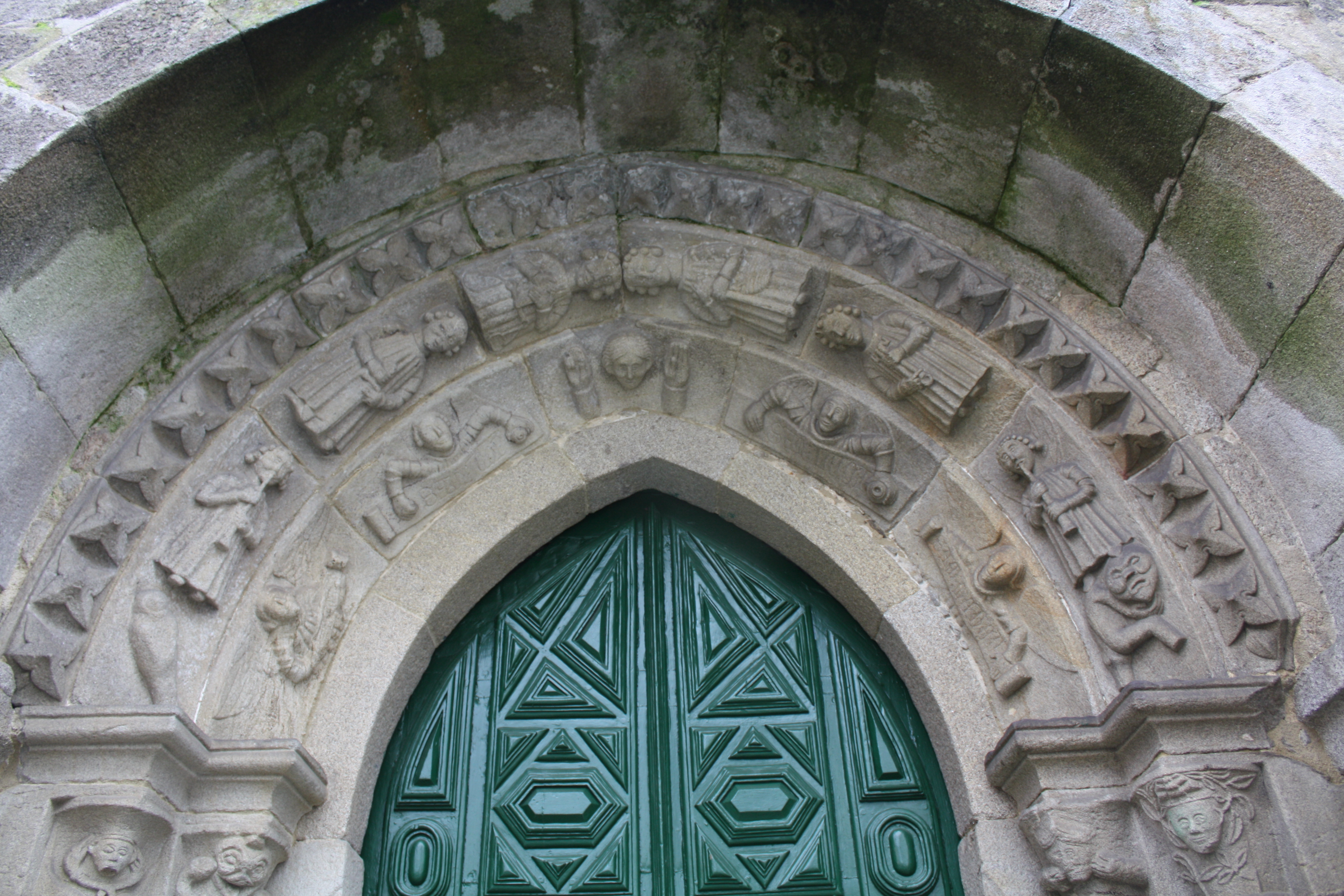

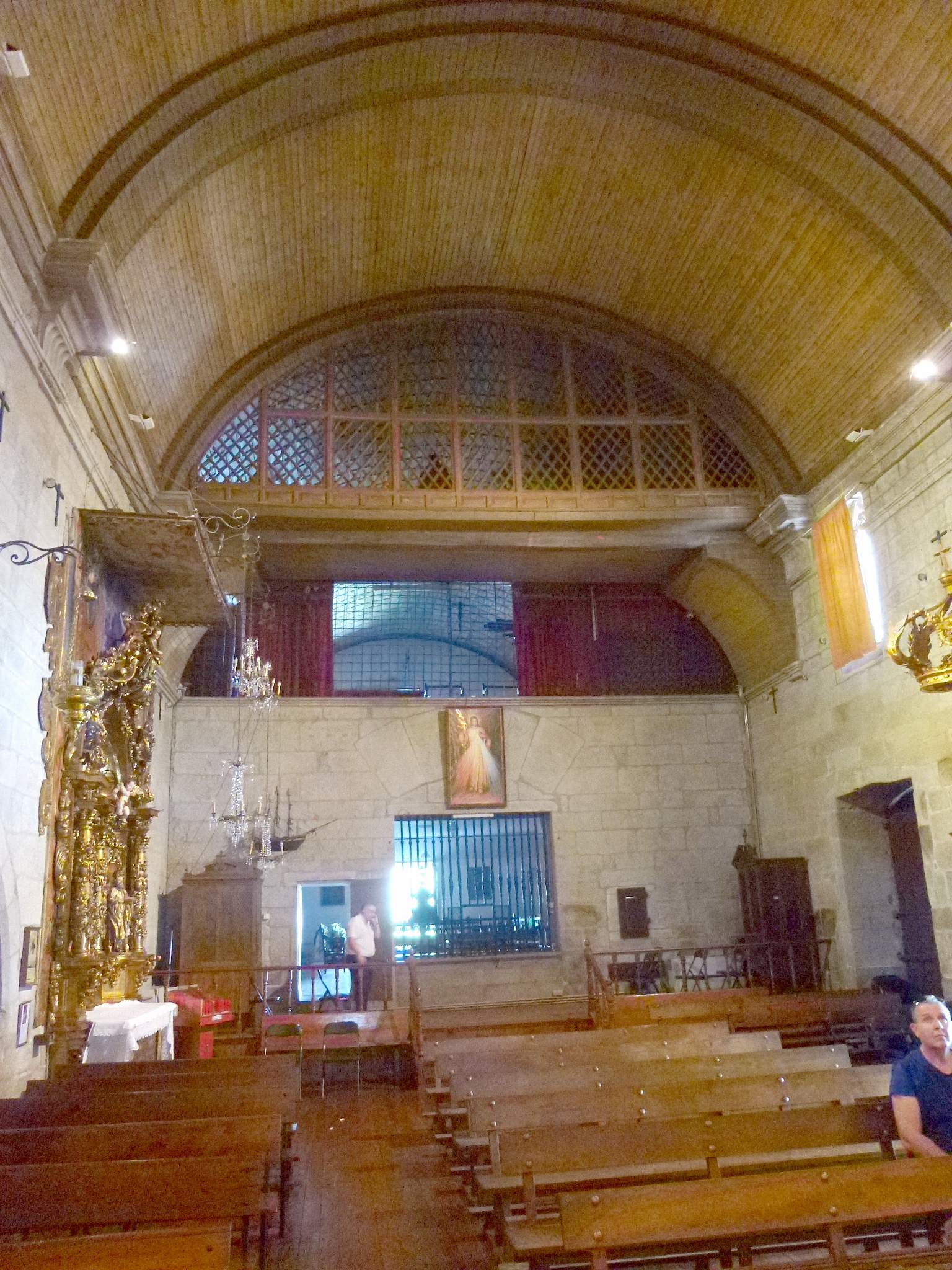

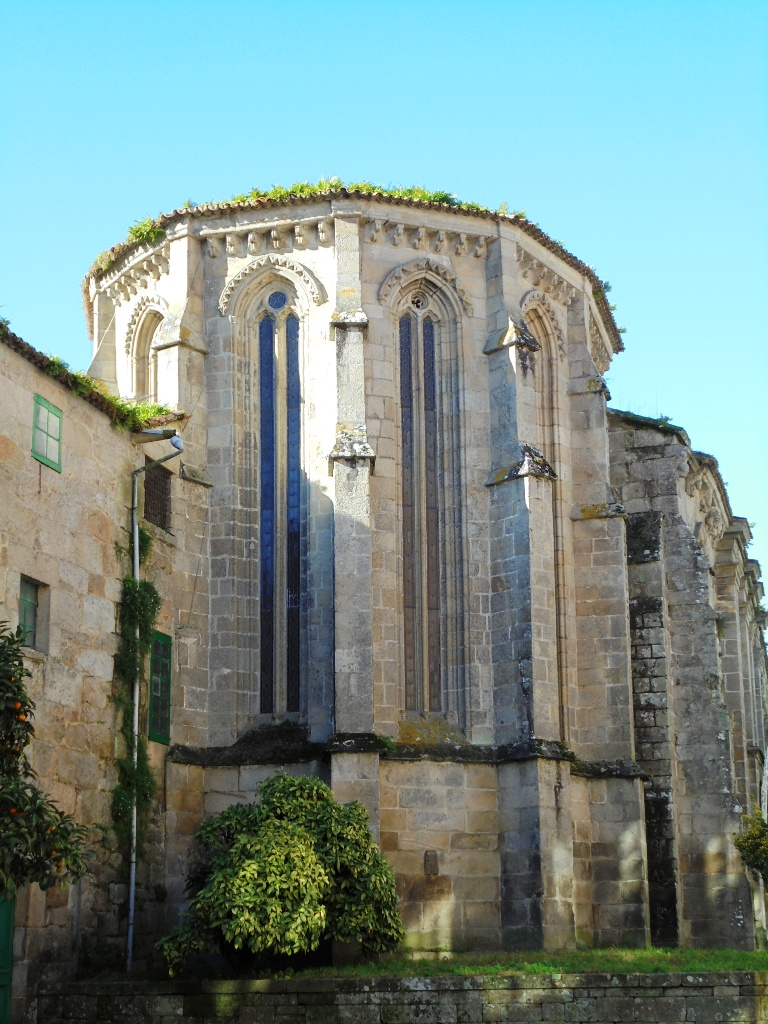

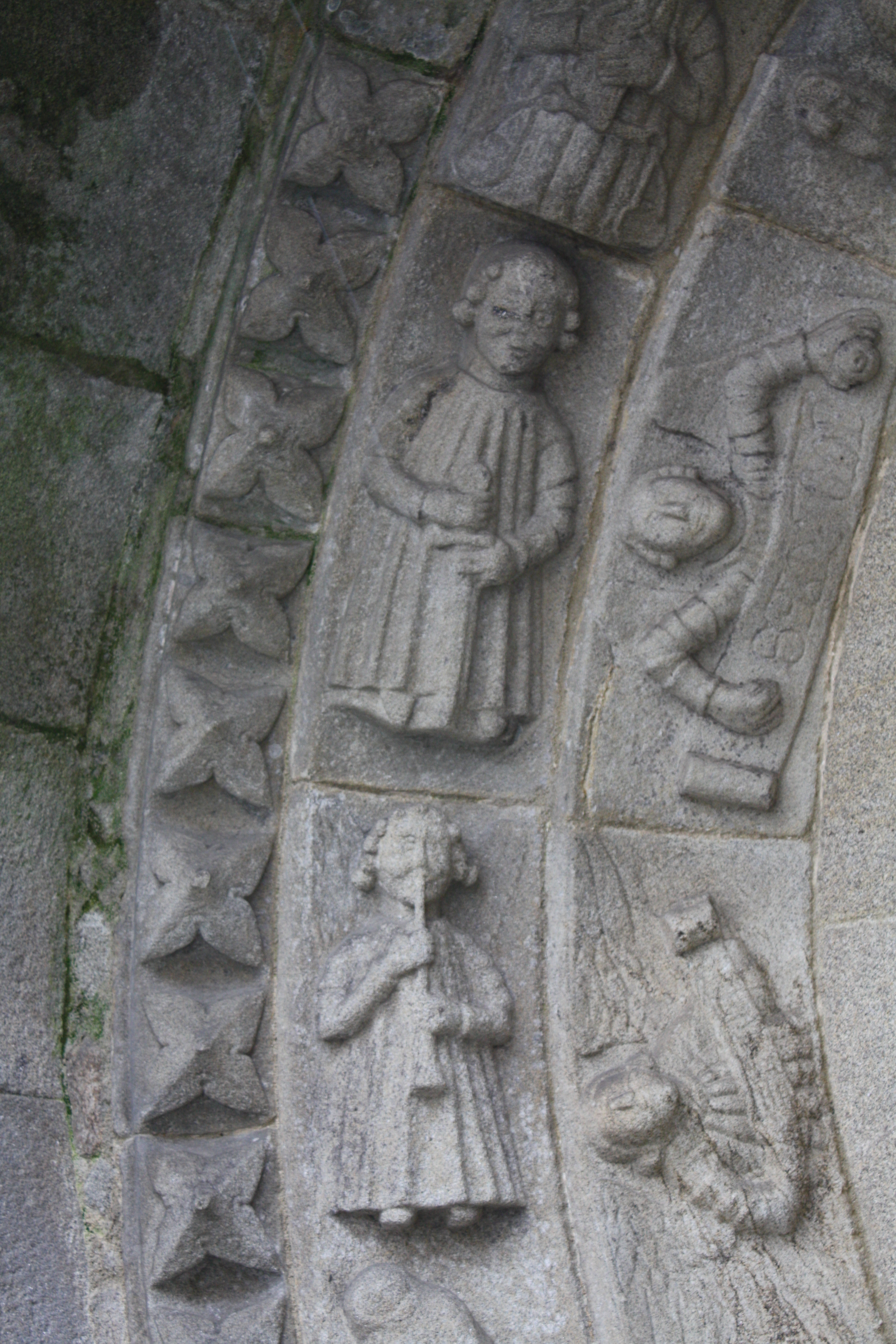

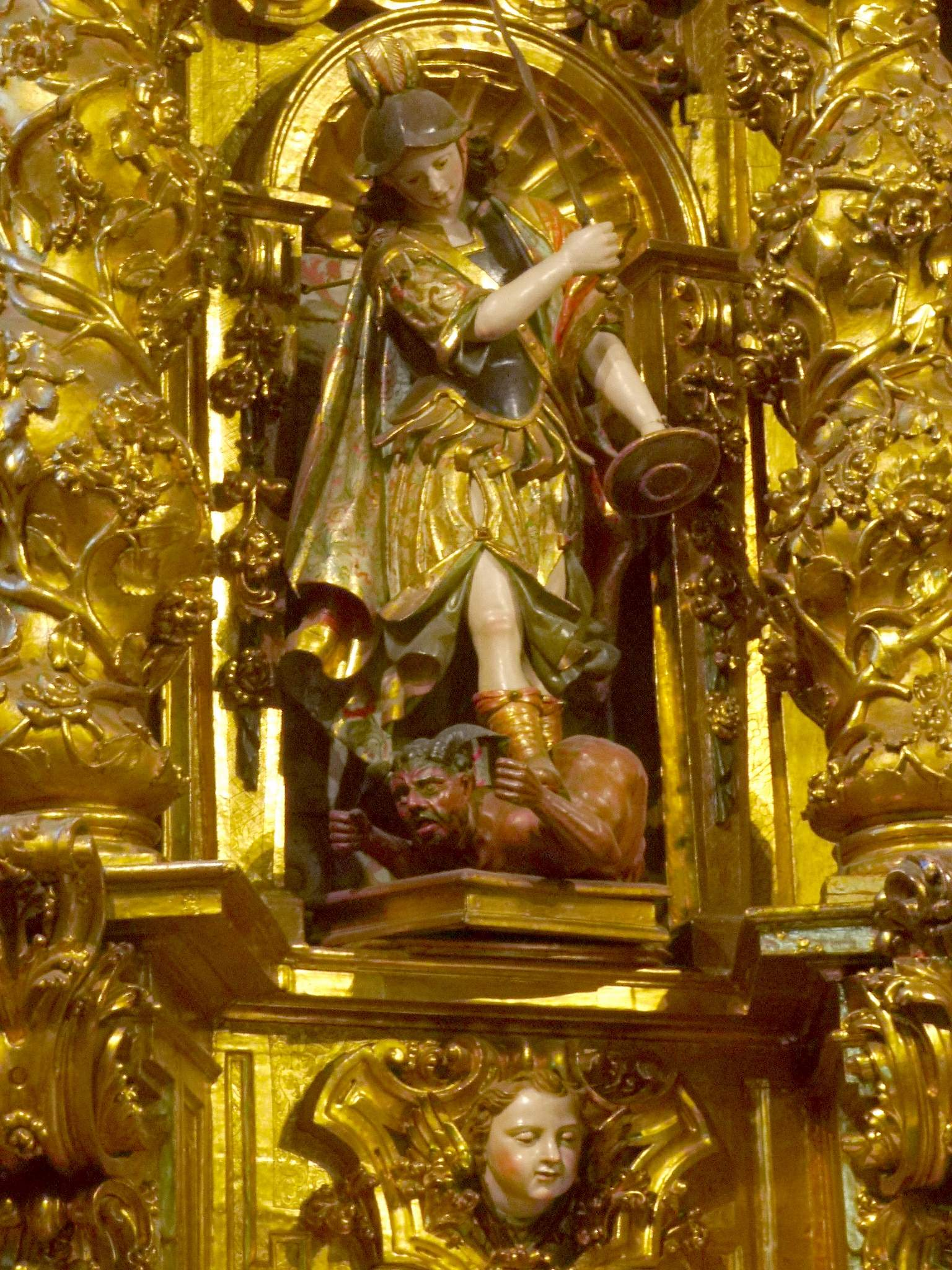

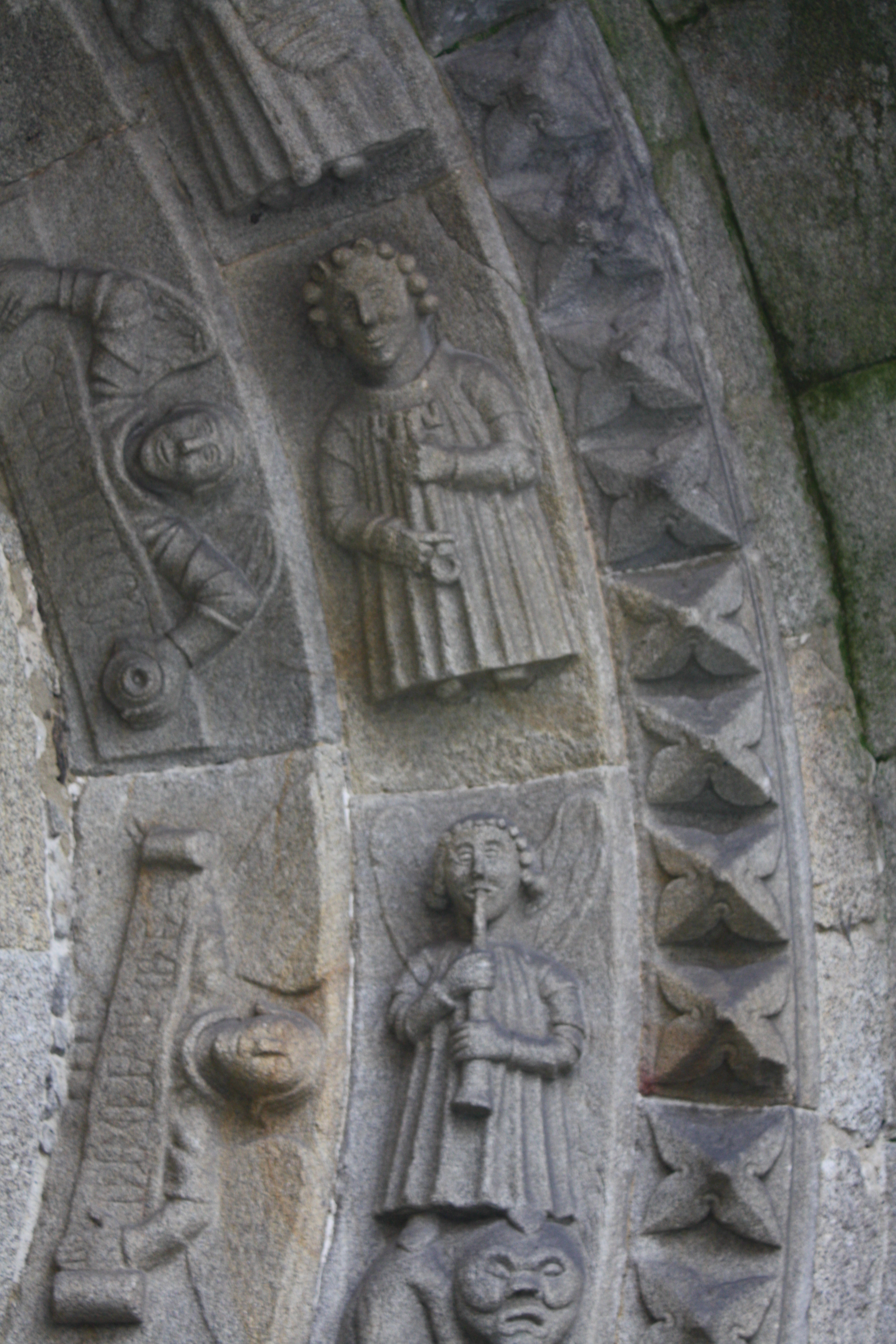

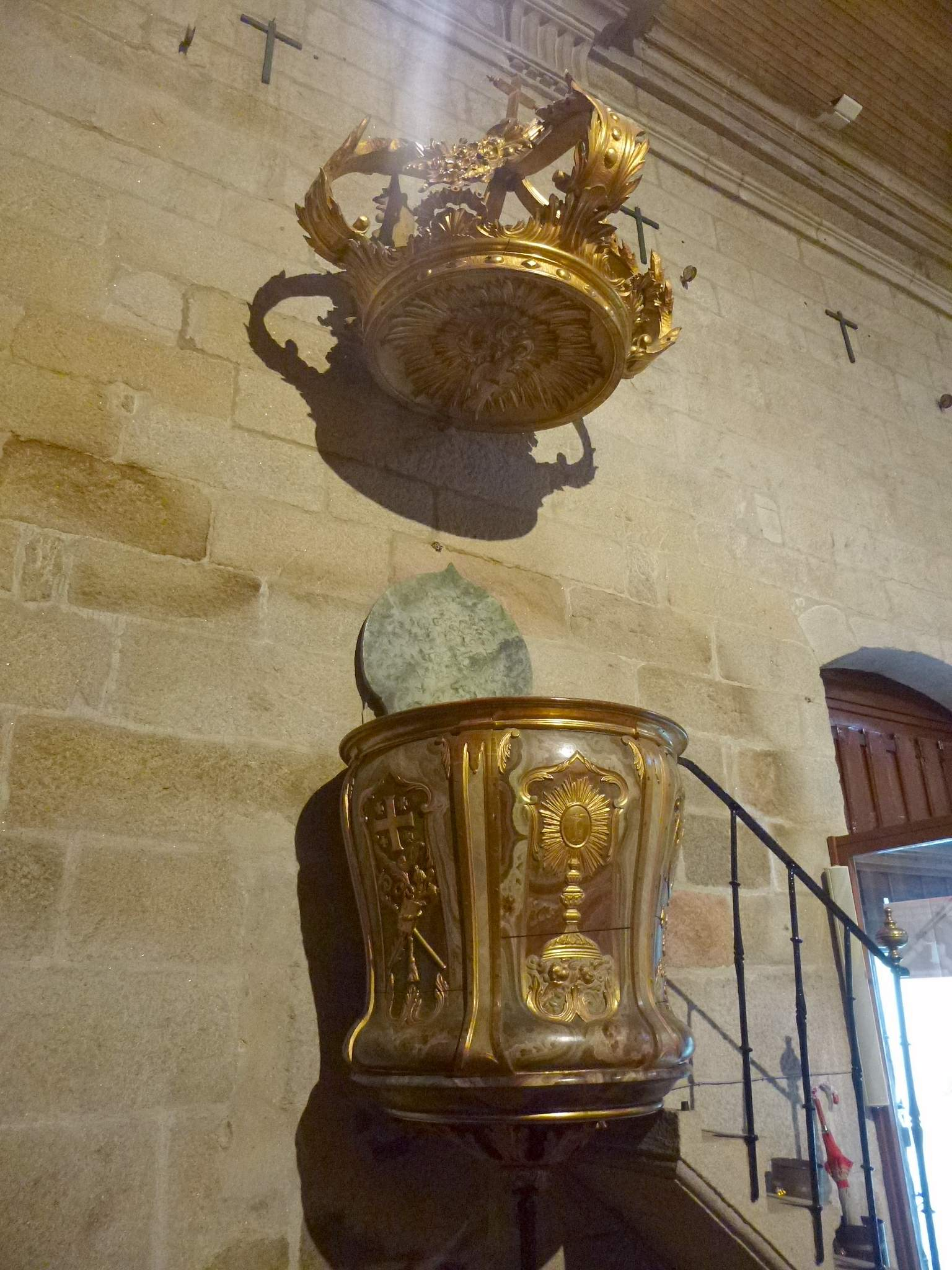

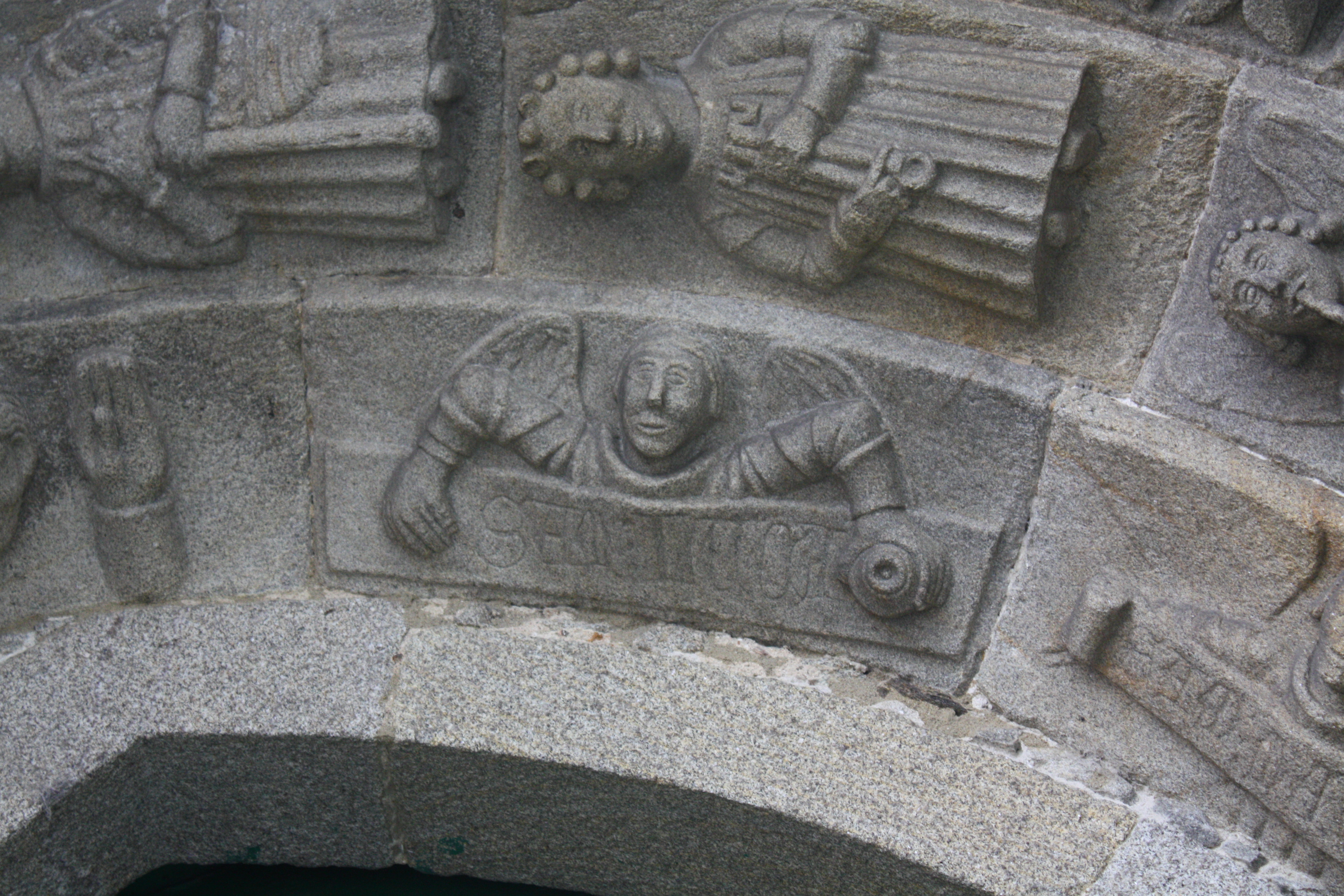

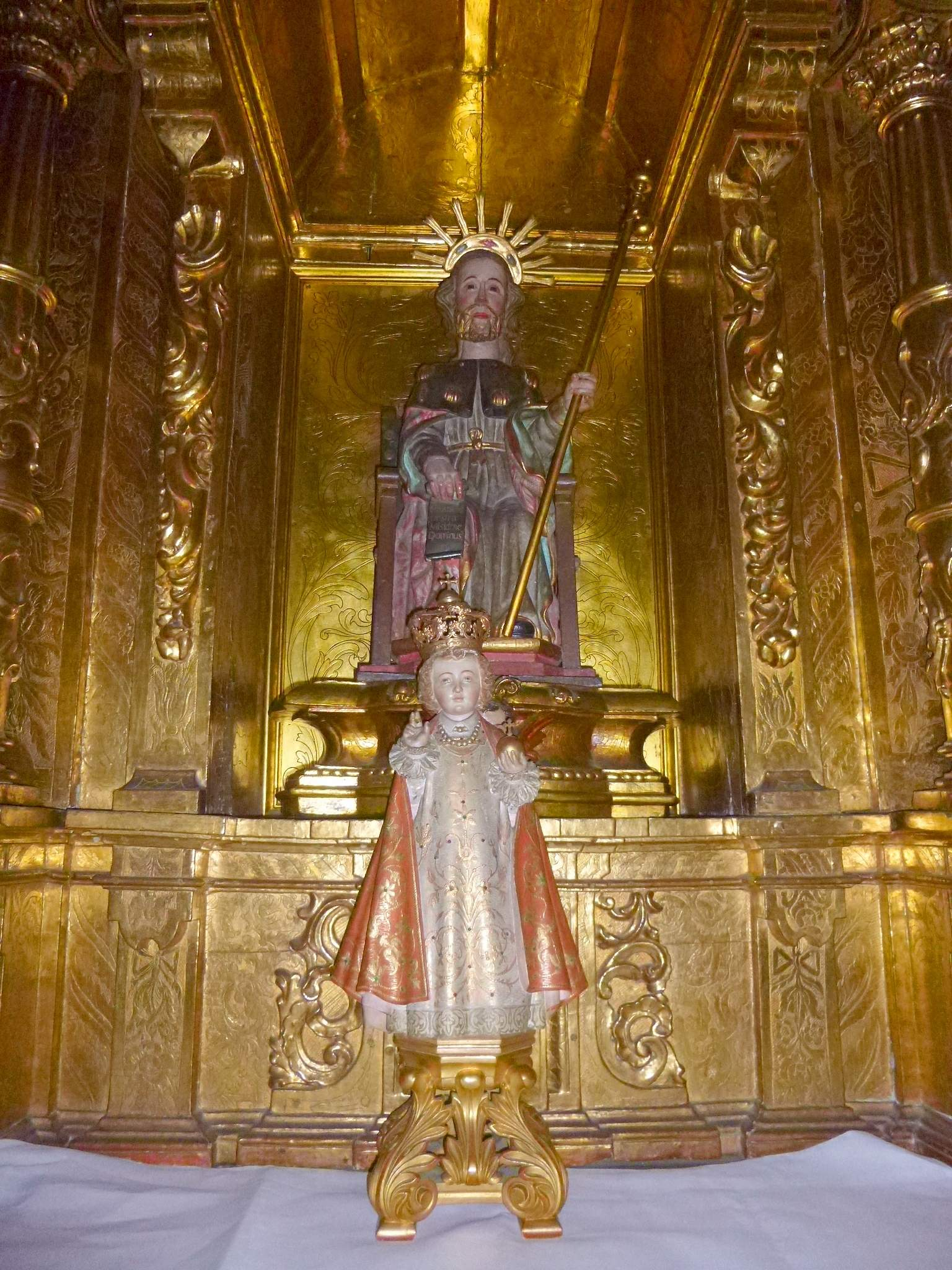

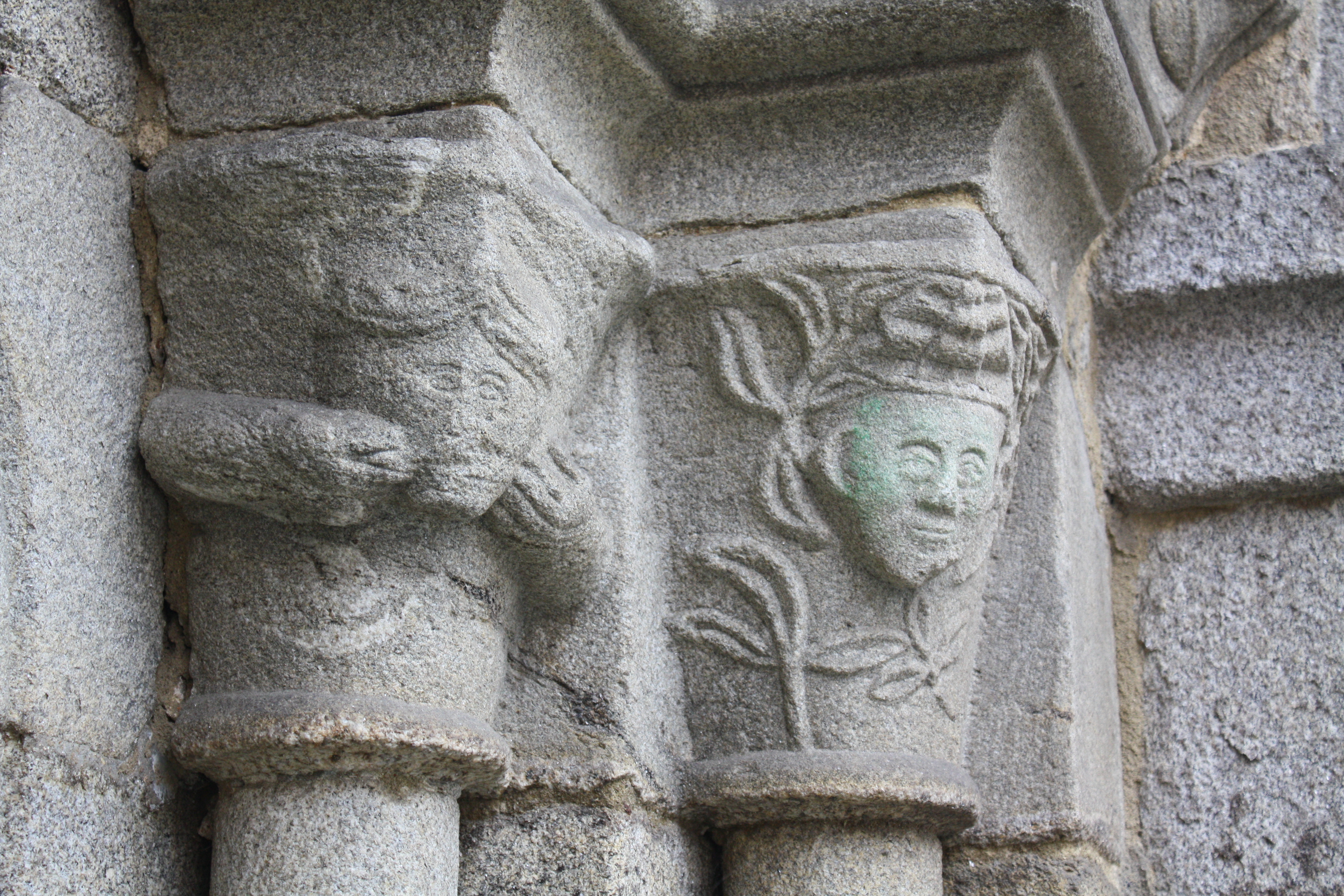

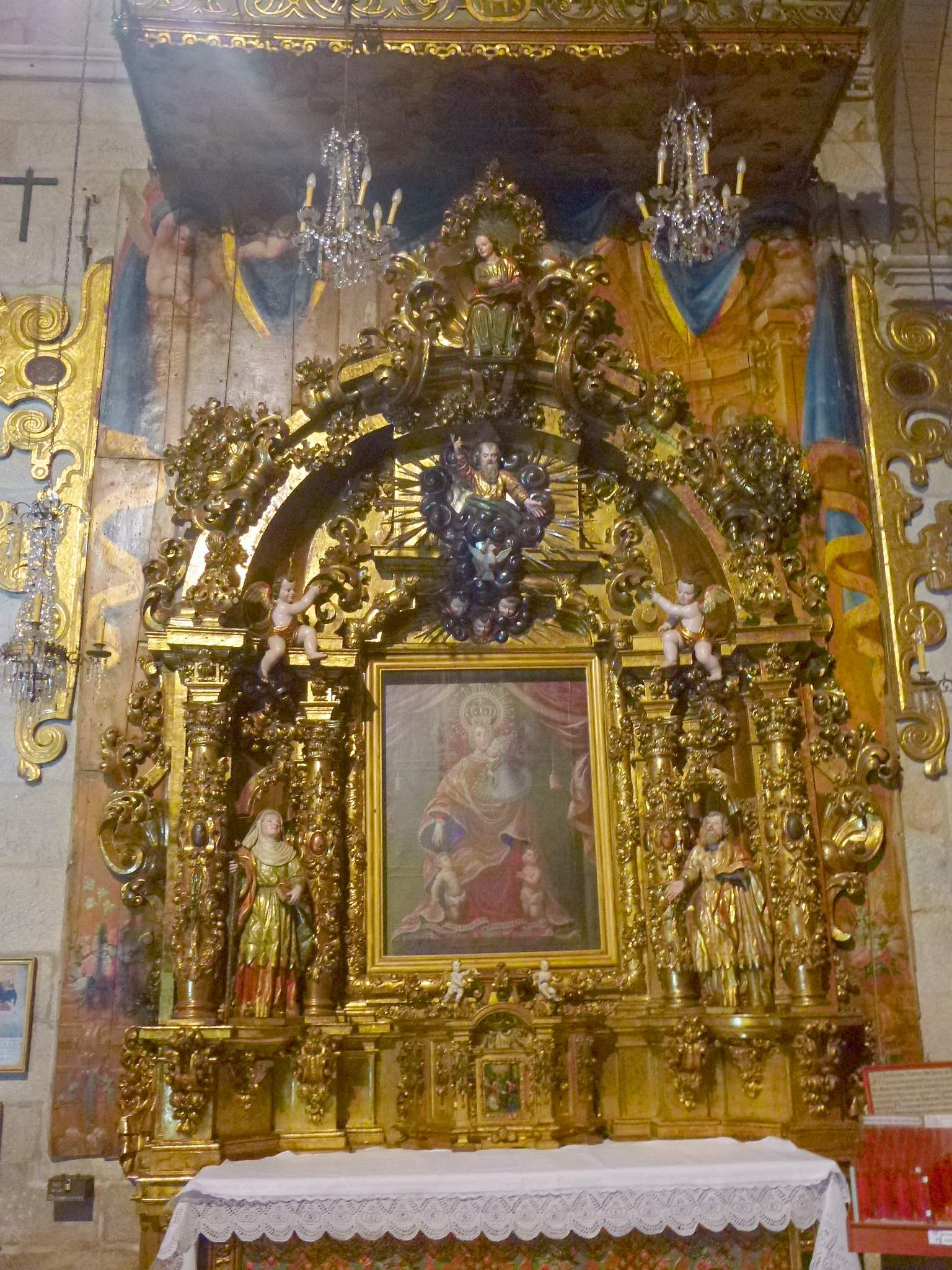

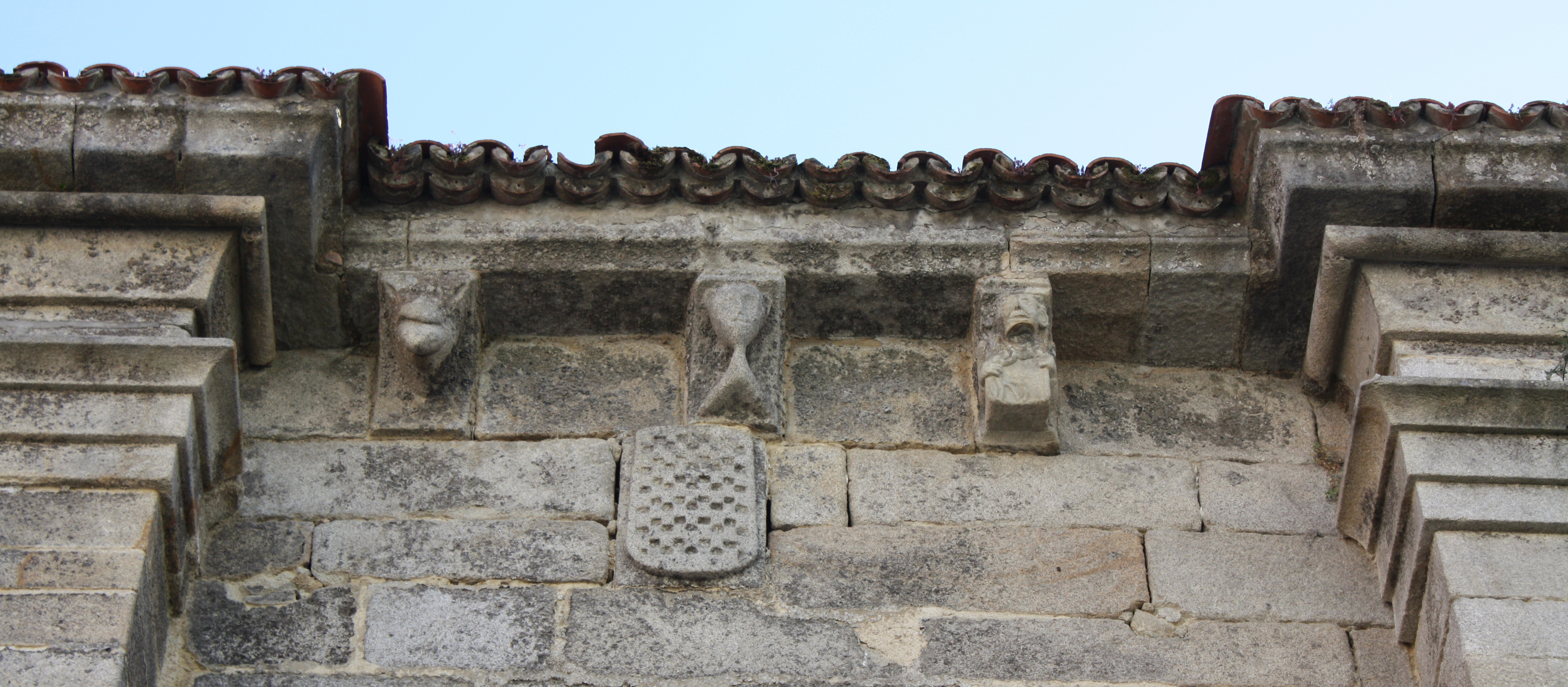
Corbels

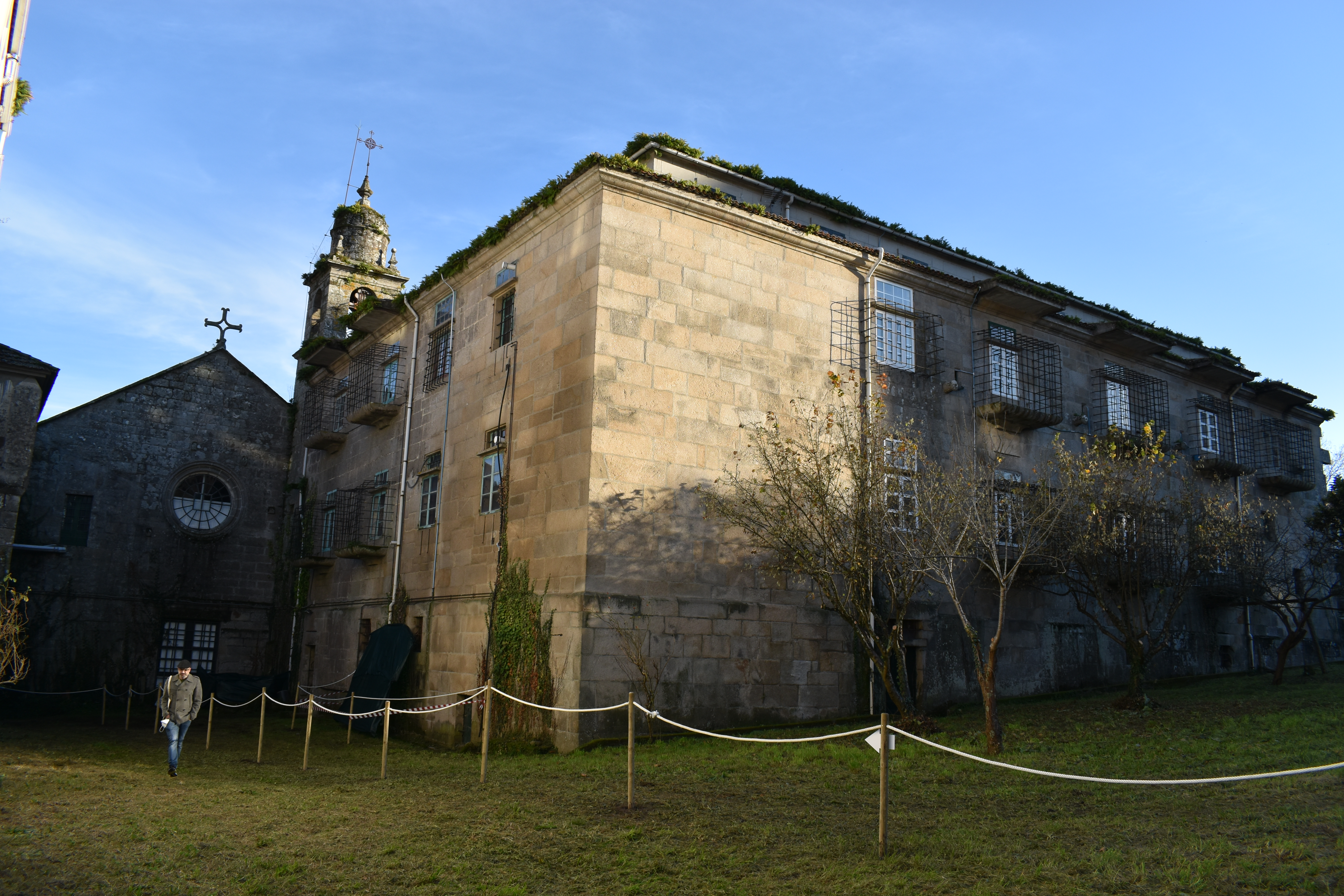
Convent and church

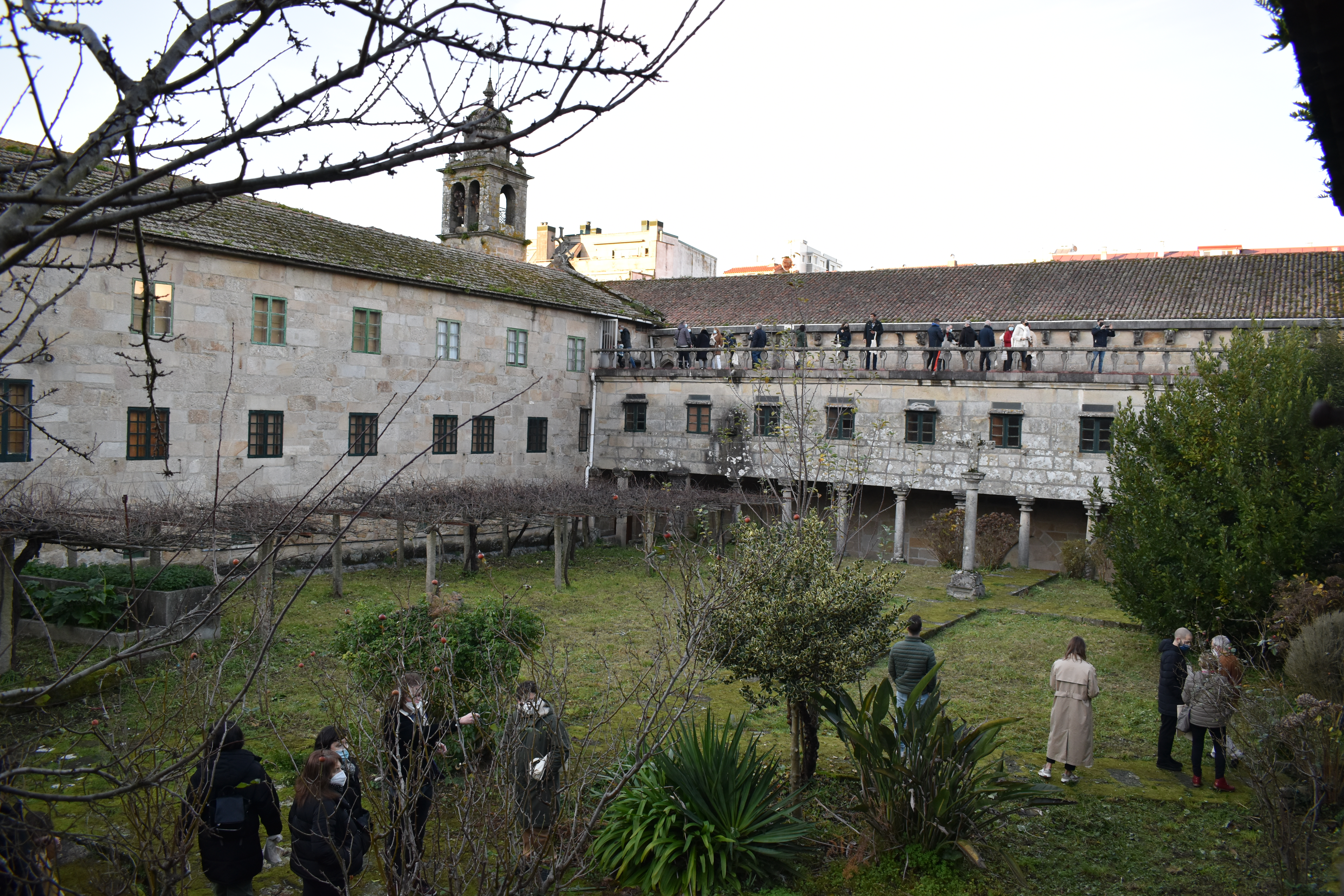
Cloister and convent

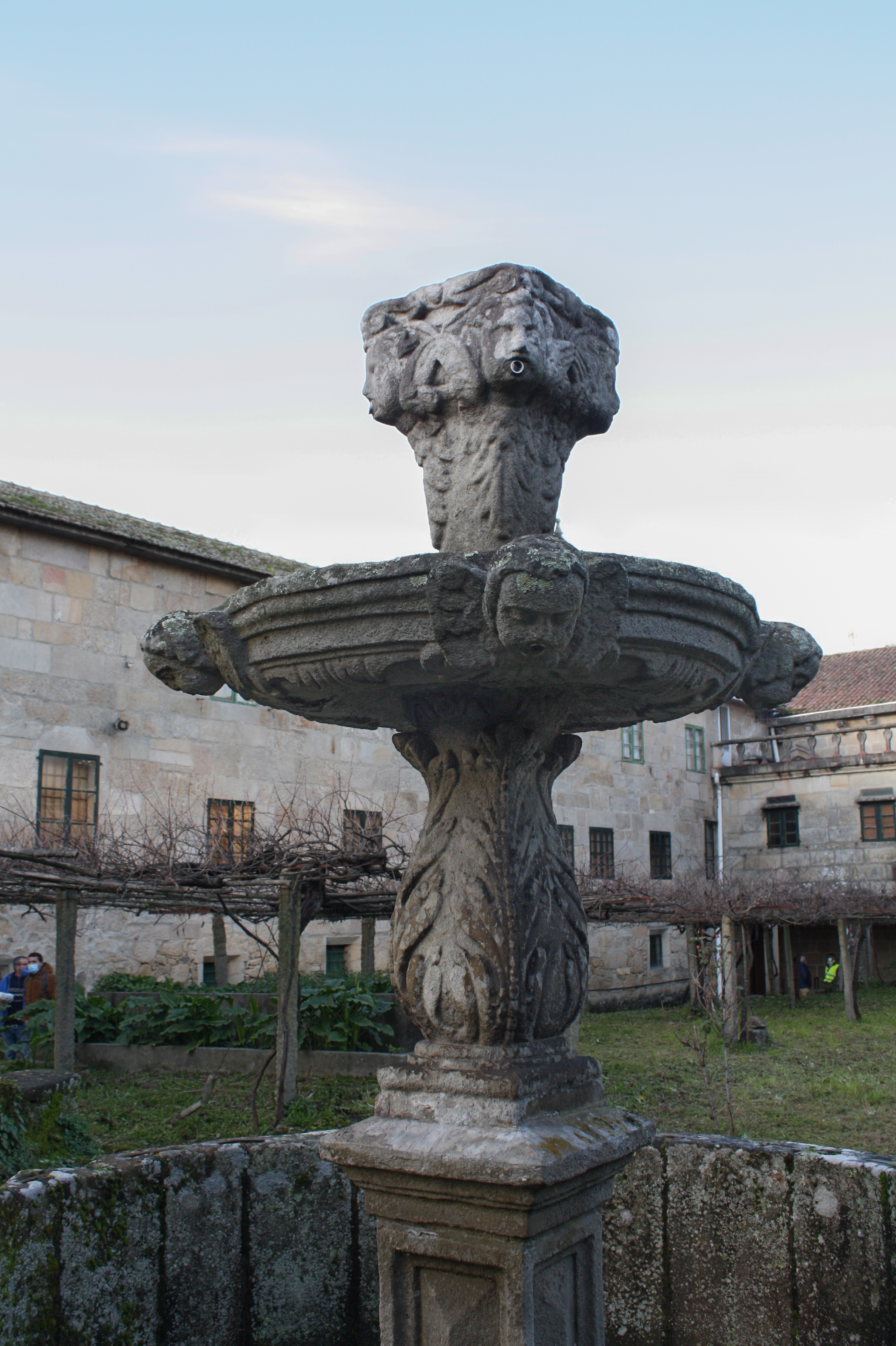
Fountain in the garden

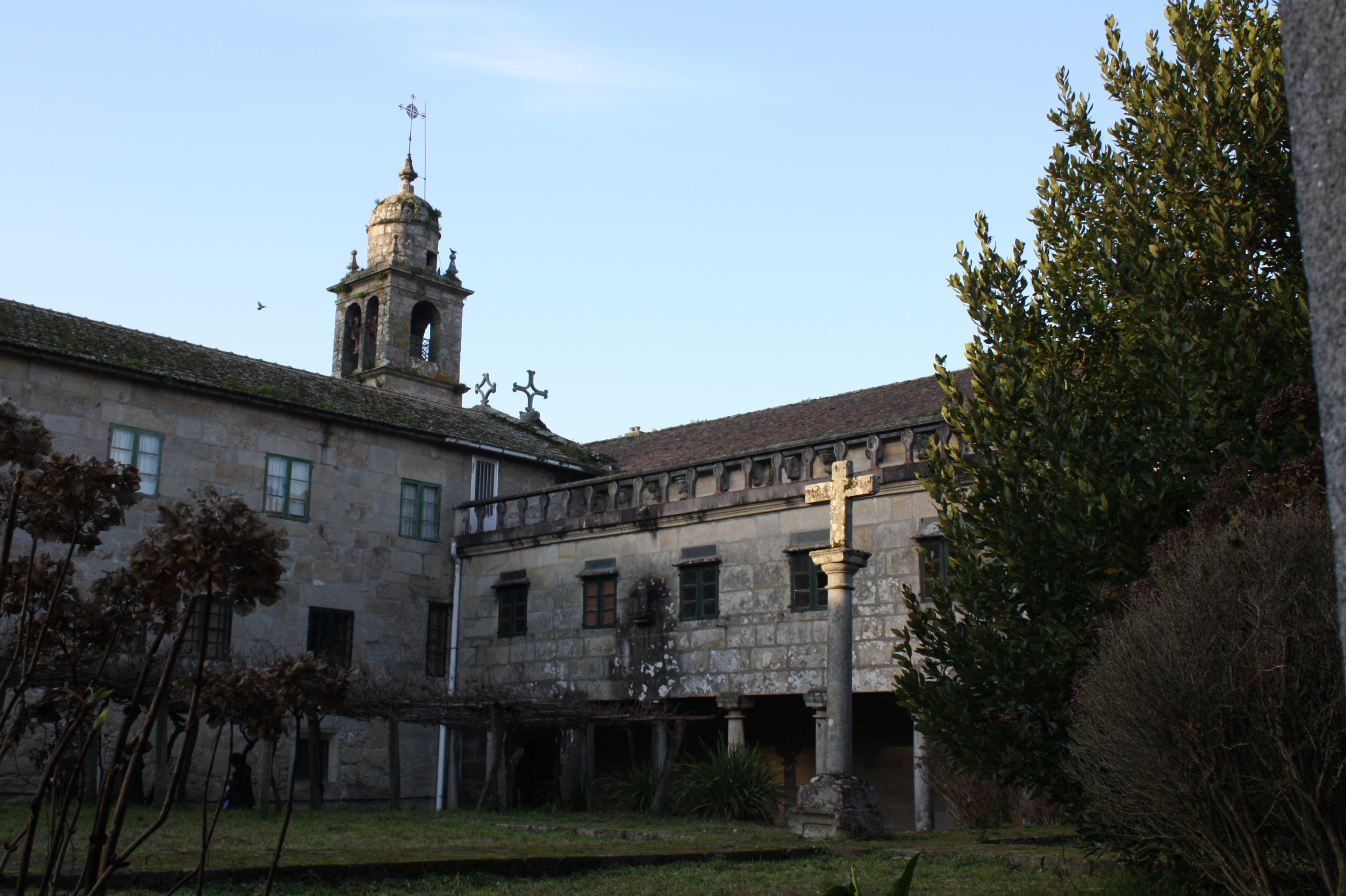
Calvary

== See also ==
=== Bibliography ===
- Aganzo, Carlos (2010). Pontevedra. Ciudades con encanto (in Spanish). Madrid: El País-Aguilar. p. 61. ISBN 978-8403509344.
- Fontoira Surís, Rafael (2009). Pontevedra monumental (in Spanish). Pontevedra: Diputación Provincial de Pontevedra. pp. 305–306. ISBN 978-84-8457-327-2.
- Riveiro Tobío, Elvira (2008). Descubrir Pontevedra (in Spanish). Pontevedra: Edicións do Cumio. pp. 23–24. ISBN 9788482890852.
- Fortes Bouzán, Xosé (1993). Historia de la Ciudad de Pontevedra (in Spanish). La Coruña: Editorial, S.A. Gaesa. pp. 129–135. ISBN 9788488254207.

=== Related articles ===
- Spanish gothic architecture
- Ruins of Saint Dominic
- Convent and church of Saint Francis

=== External links ===
- Saint Clare's convent on the website Visit-Pontevedra
- Saint Clare's convent on the website Galicia Tourism
- Convento de Santa Clara de Pontevedra Ministerio de Cultura
