= Convent and church of Saint Francis, Pontevedra =

Gothic church in Pontevedra, Spain

Convento e Iglesia de San Francisco
- Convento e Igrexa de San Francisco (Galician)
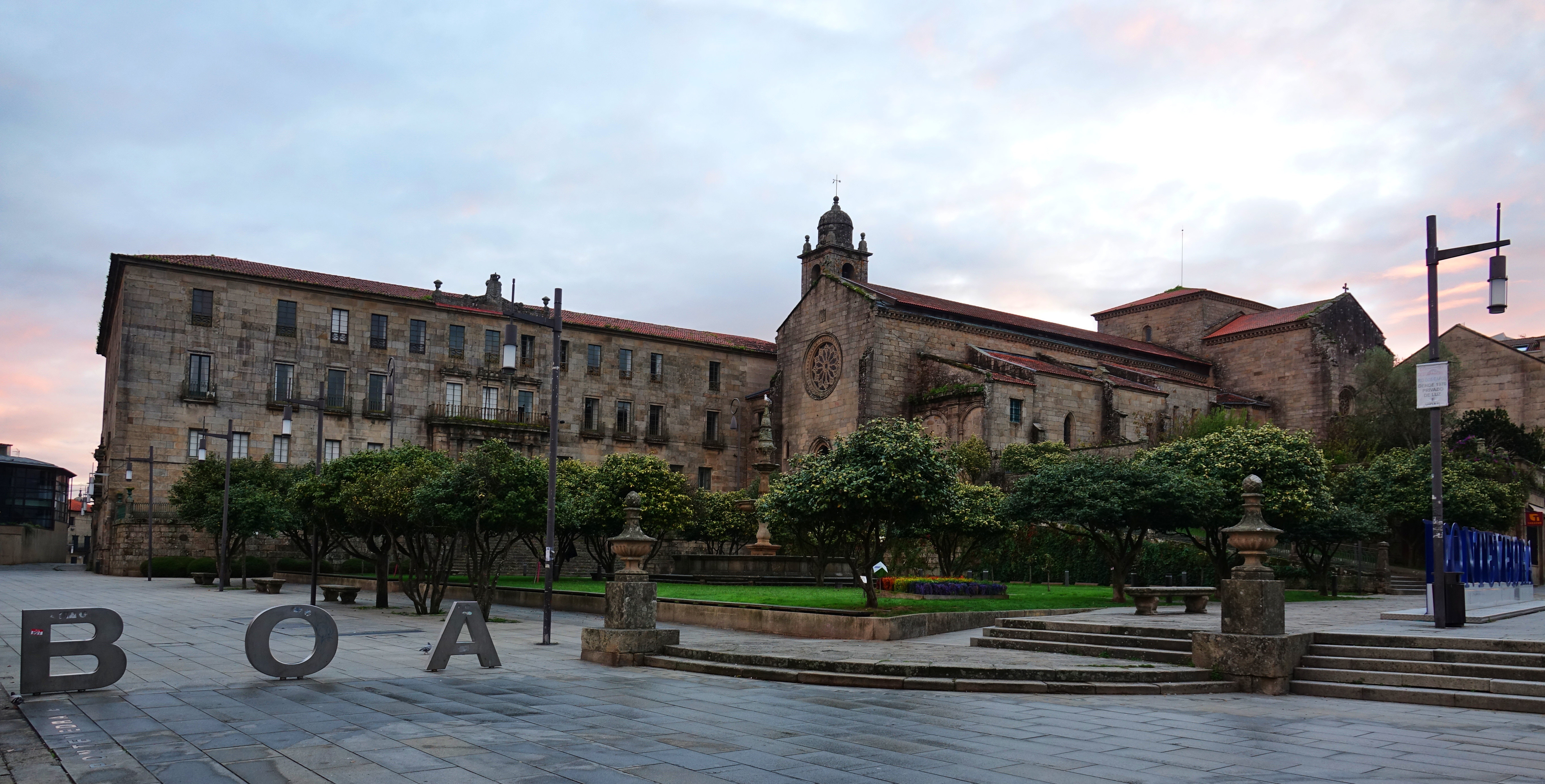
- Seen from Praza da Ferraría

- Location within Spain
- 42.431266°N 8.643133°W
- Location: Pontevedra, Spain

History
- Built: 1310–1360

Site notes
- Architectural style: Gothic architecture

Spanish Cultural Heritage
- Official name: Convento e Igrexa de San Francisco
- Type: Non-movable
- Criteria: Monument
- Designated: 1896
- Reference no.: RI-51-0000074

The Convent of St. Francis (Spanish: San Francisco) is a Franciscan convent located in the city centre of Pontevedra (Spain), overlooking the Plaza de la Herrería. The Gothic church of San Francis is attached to the convent on the southeast side.

== History ==
According to tradition, the convent was founded by Francis of Assisi, who stopped in Pontevedra when he was on the Portuguese Way to Santiago de Compostela. The arrival of the Franciscan order in the city may have taken place in the last third of the 13th century, the building being constructed between 1310 and 1360, with the economic help of the heirs of Paio Gomez Charino. The convent was built on the site of a former Templar house and church on land belonging to the Soutomaior noble family, next to the walls of Pontevedra, taking advantage of several old towers, one of which has medieval remains, possibly dating from the 11th century. At that time it was still outside the city walls.

The opulence of this construction was the envy of the members of the Dominican Order settled in the city, who had completed their church ten years earlier, and who in 1380 decided to start the construction of another church larger than the Franciscan one, with five apses.

In 1362, the construction of the apse of the church of the Poor Clares, similar to that of St. Francis, but smaller in size, was begun in the city. In addition to these three buildings, the parish church of St Bartholomew the Elder was enlarged between 1337 and 1339. This great building boom was due to the large number of financial donations from wealthy families, fearing death from the Black Death that haunted Europe at that time.

An extension paid for by Archbishop Malvar at the end of the 18th century replaced the convent's medieval cloister and erected the church tower.

Due to its strategic location, the convent has served as a refuge and fortress on several occasions throughout its history. In 1809, it was the French troops who took refuge in it to defend themselves from the people who besieged them and forced them to surrender on 28 February. Also on 24 March 1823, the liberals made a stand from it against the absolutist faction of Cotobade.

After the Spanish confiscation of Mendizábal in 1835, the convent remained unoccupied as it belonged to the municipality from that moment on. After this exclaustration in 1835, it was the Venerable Third Order that kept the church open for worship. The convent became the residence of the civil governor and the seat of the political government. Between 1836 and 1890, it also housed the offices of the Provincial Council until it was moved to the current Provincial Palace. When, in 1840, Pontevedra was besieged and invaded by troops from Vigo with the aim of removing its status as provincial capital, the inhabitants of Pontevedra defended themselves from the convent of St. Francis. In 1853, the steps leading to the church were built. In 1885, an attempt was made to install a tobacco factory in the building, but the municipality's request was rejected. In 1891 the convent became the headquarters of the state Treasury Department.

At the beginning of the 20th century, the municipal fire station was housed in an outbuilding with a façade at the back of the convent. In 1900, the architect Arturo Calvo Tomelén carried out a series of works on the chevet of the church, during which the windows of the apse and the rose window of the transept were brought to light. On 15 January 1909, Father Luis María Fernández Espinosa and five other friars returned to the premises, with a twenty-five-year lease for 250 pesetas per year. In 1930, the temple was ceded by the Royal Order and from 1932 the convent became the exclusive use of the Ministry of Finance.

On the night of 17 June 1995, the temple burned down and was restored shortly afterwards. The restored church reopened on 5 October 1996.

The convent housed the Provincial Treasury until 2010, when it was moved to the Campolongo district.

== Description ==
=== The church of St. Francis ===
The church is in the late Gothic or ogival style and was declared a historical and artistic monument in 1896. It corresponds to the model of the mendicant churches and has a Latin cross plan, with a single nave, a wood-covered crossing and a chevet with three polygonal apses, covered with ribbed vaults. The central nave, 100 metres long and 10 metres wide, is the highest of all the Franciscan churches in Galicia. Inside the church are the sarcophagi of Paio Gomez Charino, Juan Feijóo de Soutomaior and Pelayo de Montenegro. The church has several chapels dedicated to: the Sorrows or Annunciation (1590) on the Epistle side, the Good Success or Sacred Heart (1670), the Third Order, the Immaculate Conception and Mercy (1677), St. Anthony, St. Elizabeth or the Visitation. At the entrance to the church, on the Epistle side, there is a mural, from around 1500, depicting the Mass of St Gregory. On the outside, the main façade has a pointed arch and moulded Archivolts.

The Stained glass windows in the church have a deeply Franciscan iconographic programme: in the main chapel, the themes of Christ and Mary are represented in the centre with the images of the Ecce homo and our Lady of Sorrows. To their right are St. Matthew, St. John, St. Peter and St. Francis, and to the left St. Anthony of Padua, St. Paul, St. Mark and St. Luke. Thus, the central position of Jesus and Mary is completed and highlighted on each side by two saints of the Franciscan Order, Francis and Anthony of Padua, then by the apostles, Peter and Paul, and at the ends, on each side, two by two, by the four Evangelists.

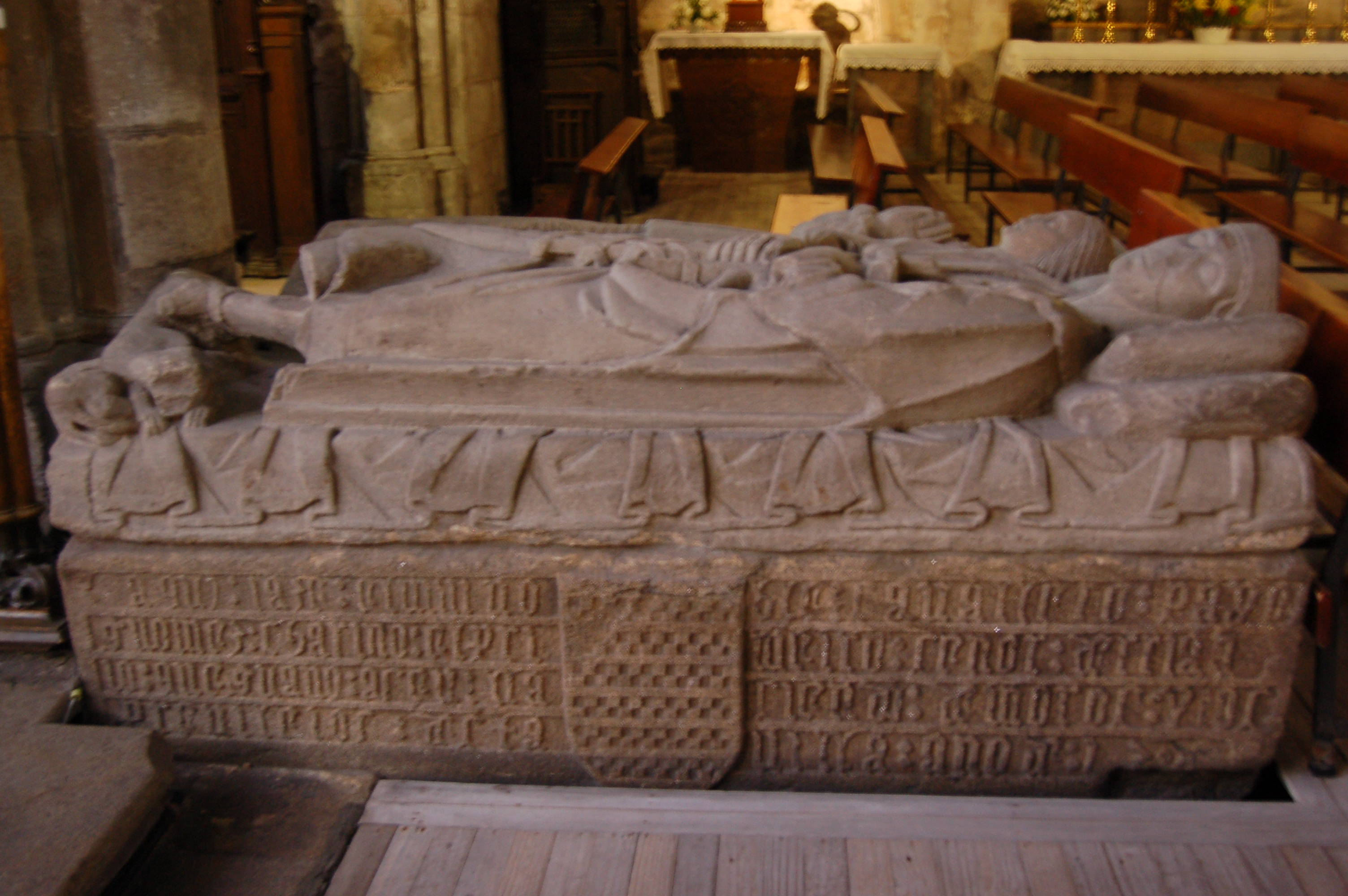
Sarcophagus of Paio Gomez Charino

=== The convent ===
The convent was rebuilt in the 18th century in the Baroque style. The construction was completed in 1800. When the walls of Pontevedra were demolished, the St. Dominic's Gate or City Gate was incorporated into its façade, at the main entrance.

It is a sober building of large dimensions with three floors and a stone plinth. The lintelled doors and windows are plain. Above the central window of the balcony on the façade, above a small pediment, there is a Pontevedra stone coat of arms.

The convent has a rectangular plan with a cloister on the south-east side and two courtyards of different sizes on the north-west side. The exterior has many elongated, symmetrical windows, with balconies on the main façade and a large balcony above the entrance door. Access to the church is through a door in the left wing of the transept. The building is 100 metres long, 30 metres wide and 24 metres high.

The cloister has a square floor plan and a central transept. It is much more sober than the Gothic cloister it replaced in the 18th century, but it has some plaque decoration. On the left side of the conventual church are the doors that connect the church with the cloister and which communicates with the Franciscan conventual quarters.

The interior of the Baroque convent was designed with three noble rooms dedicated to the dining room, the prayer area and the monks' meeting space.

== Culture ==
The convent is currently occupied by four Franciscan friars. The convent is home to the community kitchen St. Francis, which feeds a number of needy people from Monday to Saturday.

The church was chosen centuries ago as a burial place by some of the main noble families of Pontevedra, such as the Sarmiento and Mariño de Lobeira families.

== Gallery ==
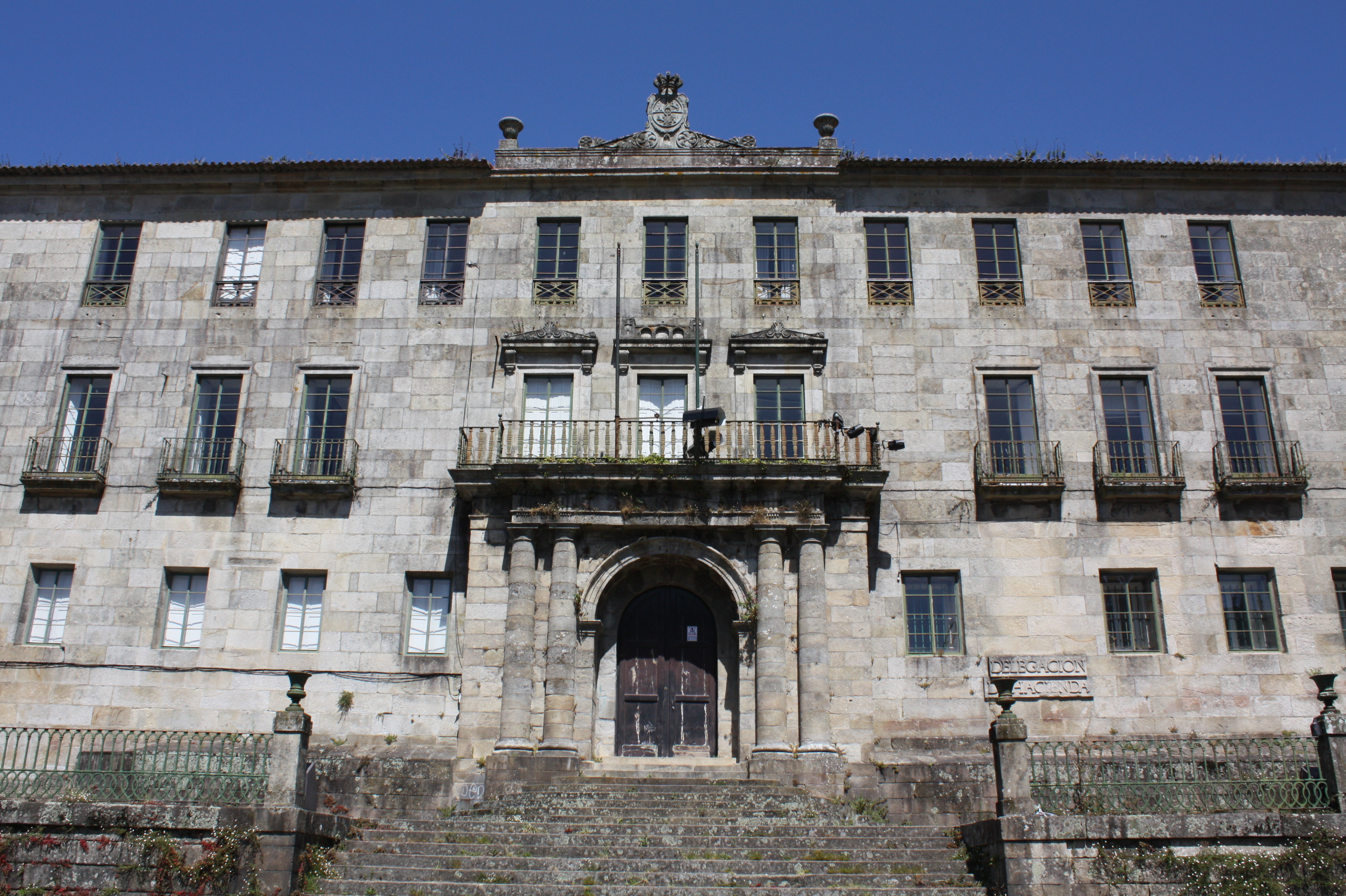
Convent main façade

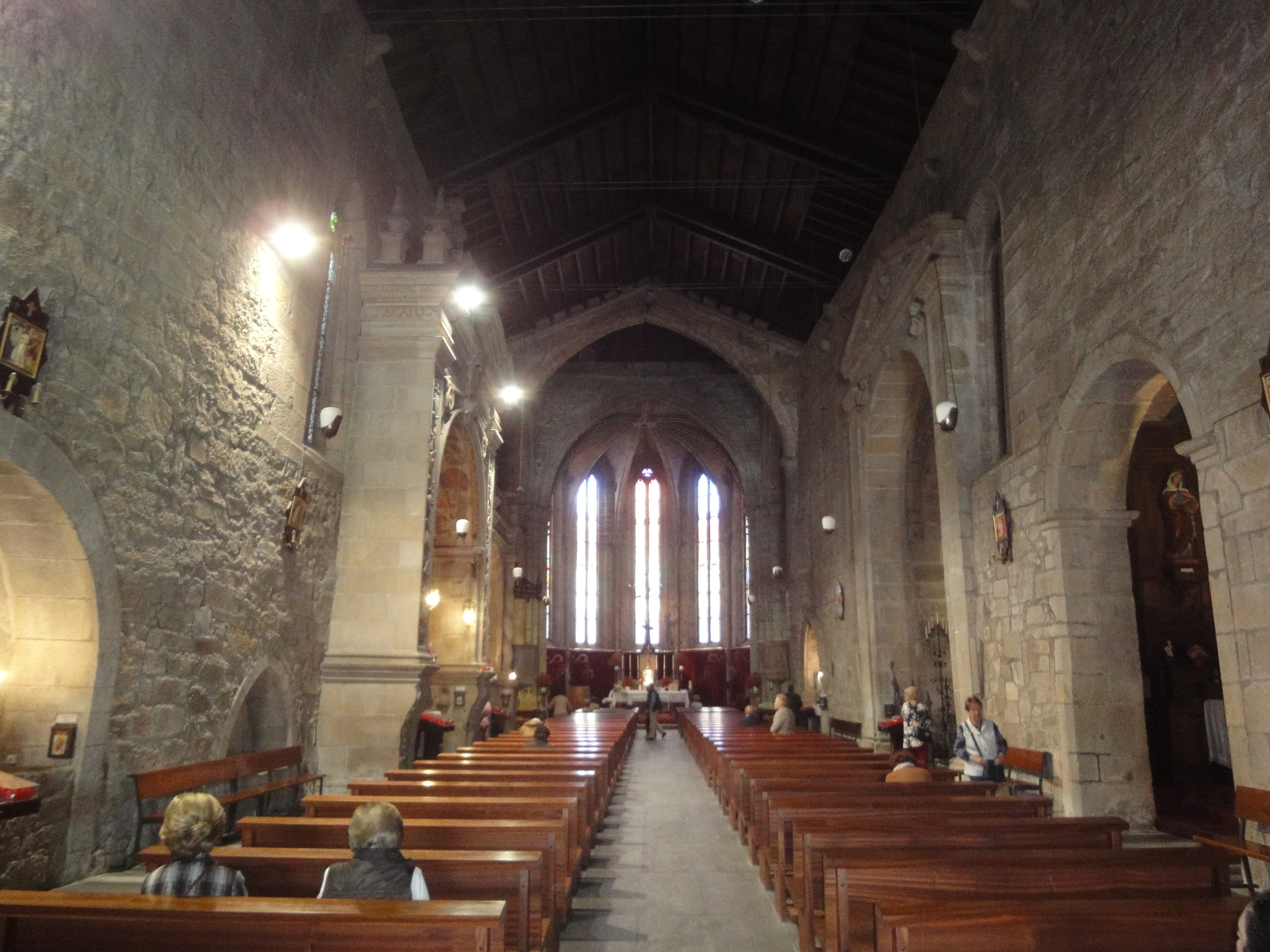
Central nave of the church

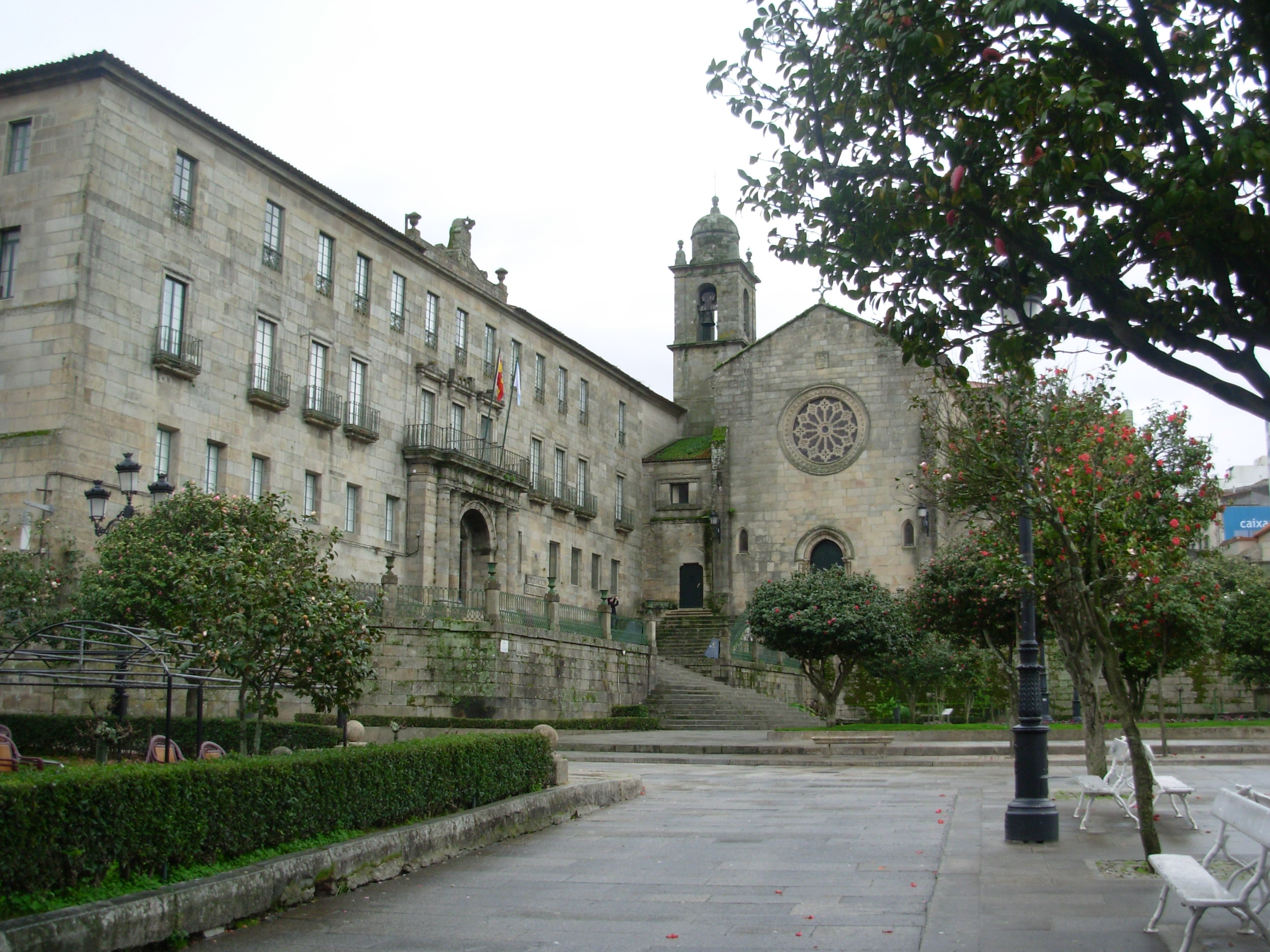
Convent

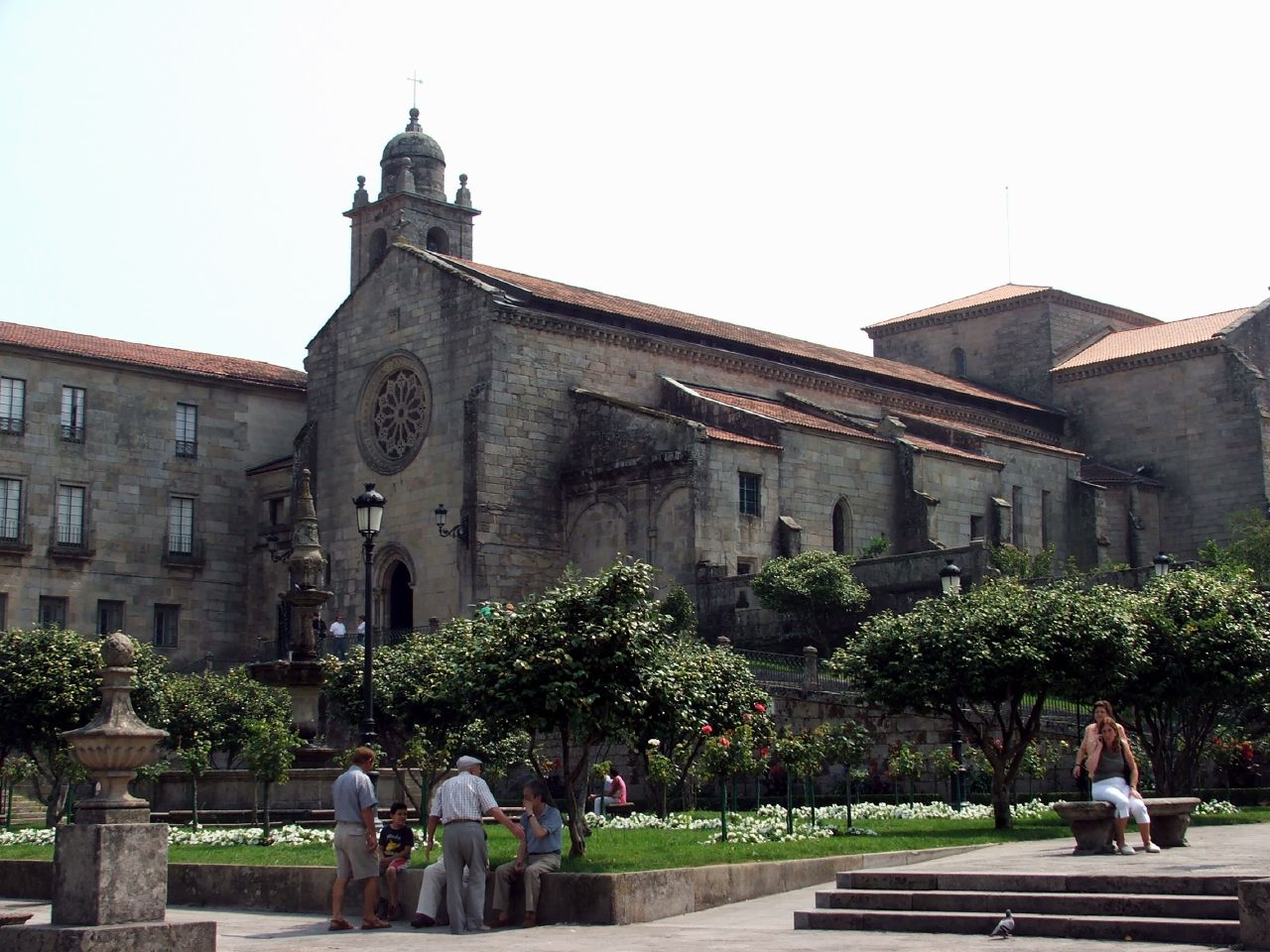
Church

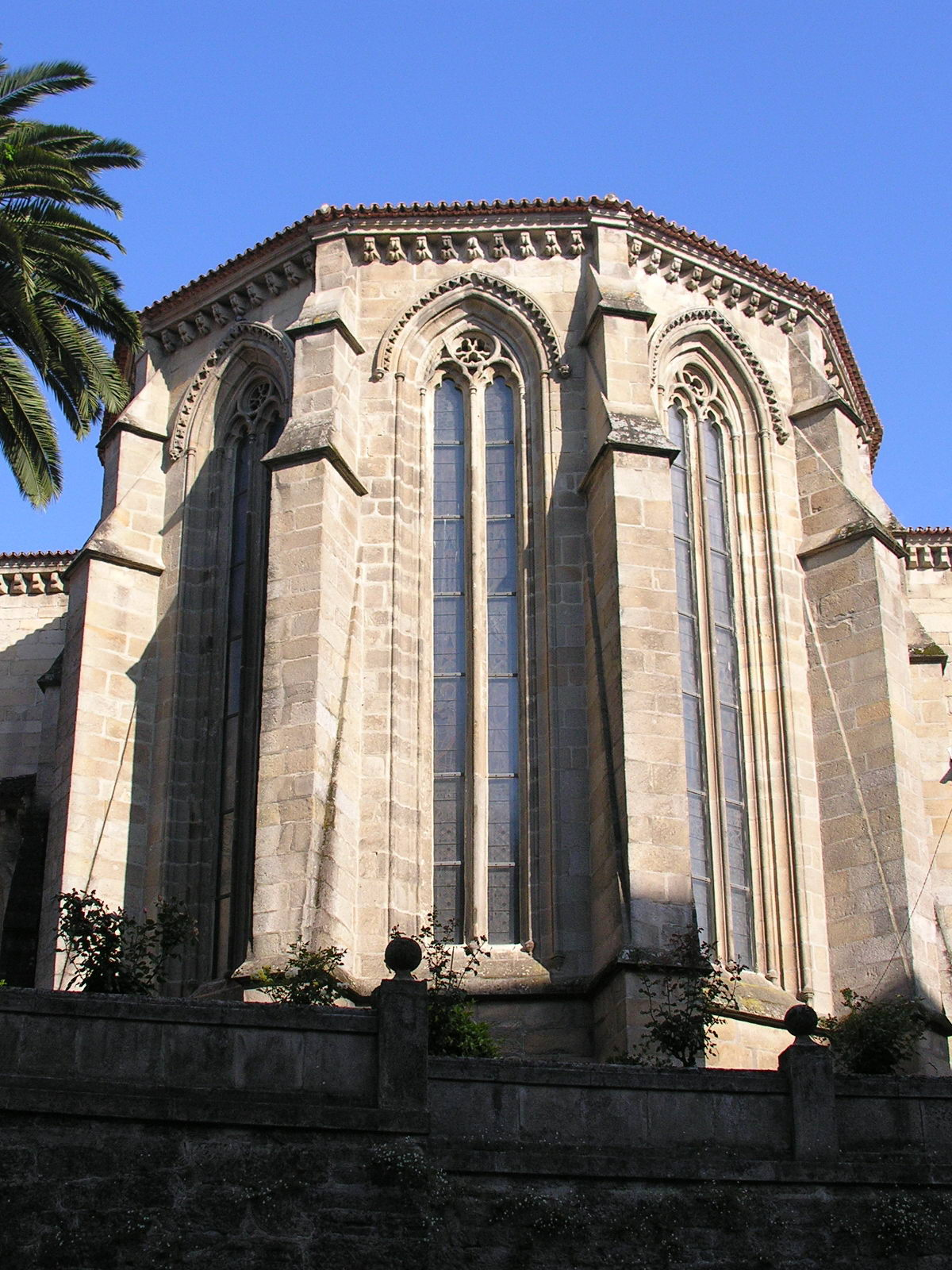
Apse of the church

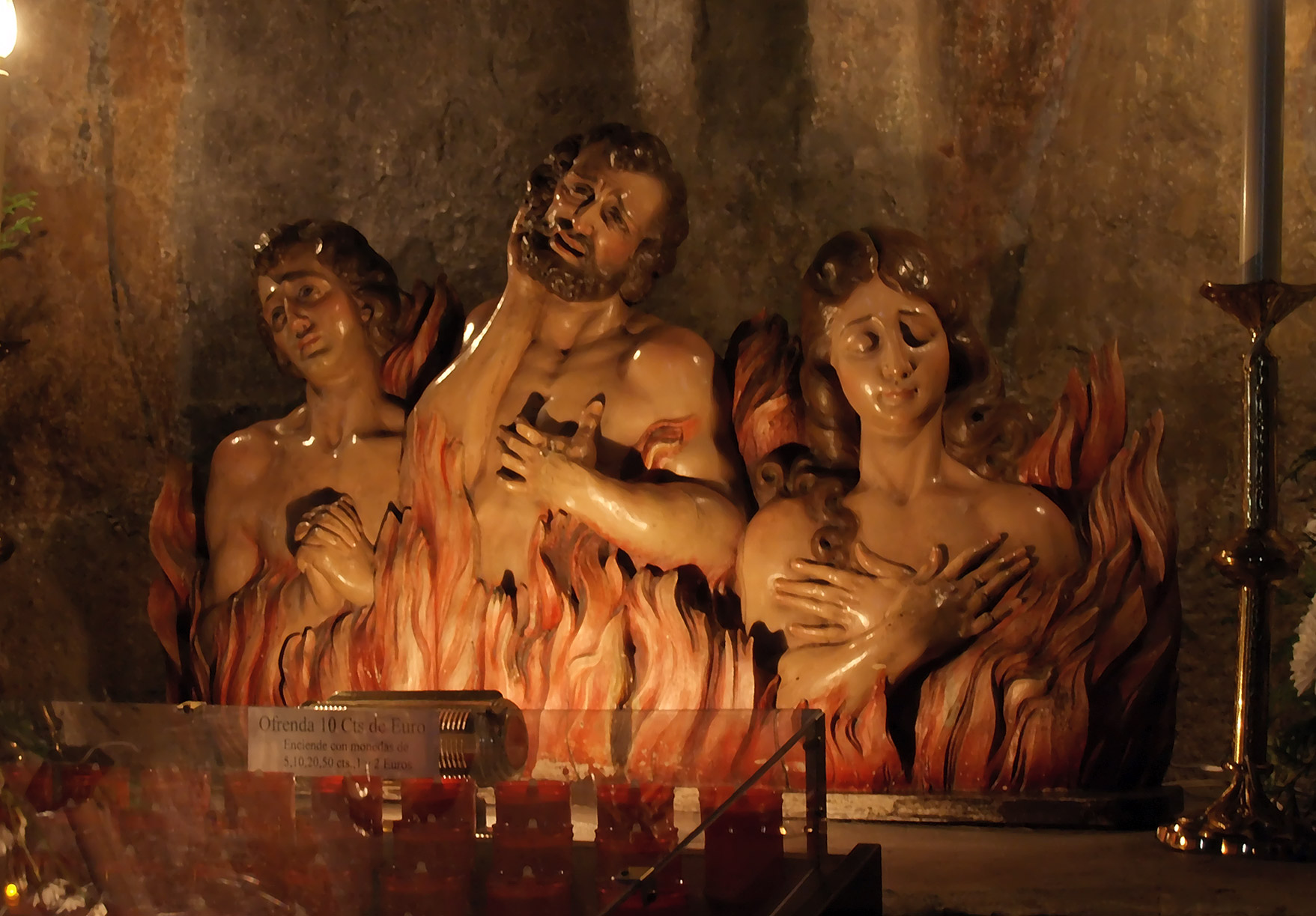
Souls in Purgatory

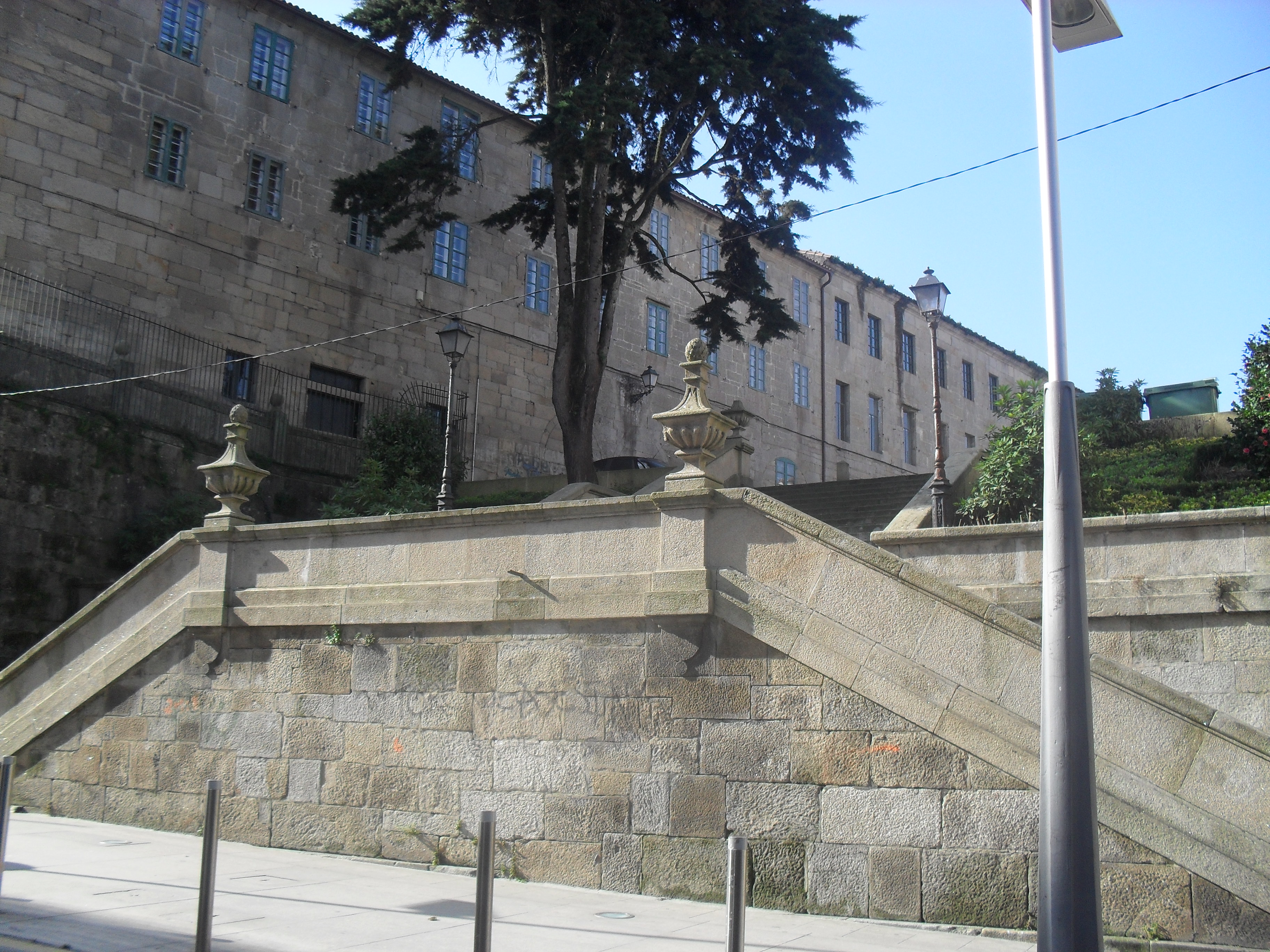
Rear of the convent

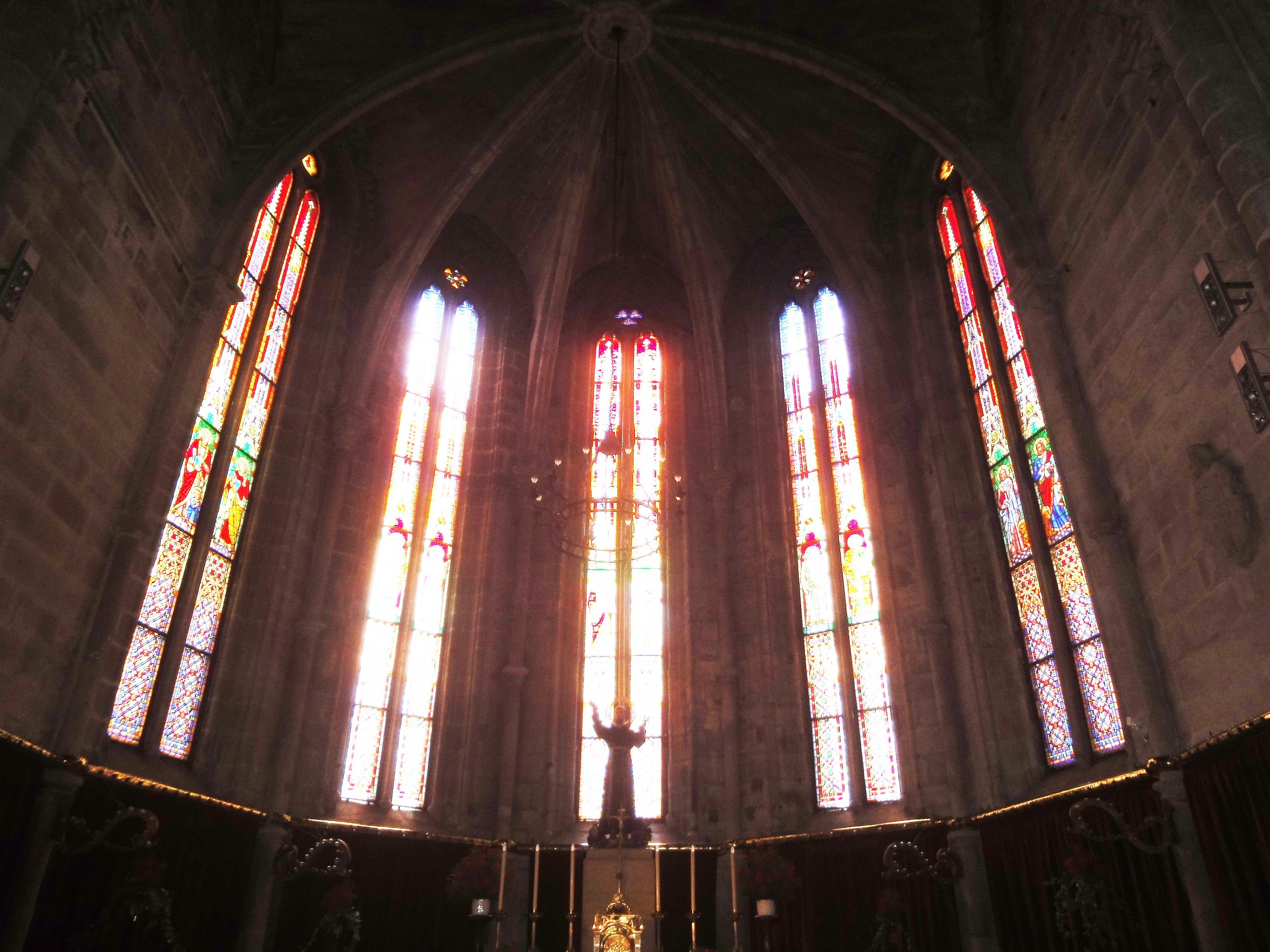
Stained glass windows of the high altar

== See also ==
=== Bibliography ===
- Aganzo, Carlos (2010). Ciudades con encanto. Pontevedra (in Spanish). Madrid: El País-Aguilar. pp. 44–50. ISBN 978-84-03-50934-4.
- Fontoira Surís, Rafael (2009). Pontevedra monumental (in Galician). Pontevedra: Diputación de Pontevedra. p. 529. ISBN 9788484573272.
- Juega Puig, Juan (2002). Historia de Pontevedra. As orixes medievais de Pontevedra (in Galician). Pontevedra: Lérez Ediciones.
- Riveiro Tobío, Elvira (2008). Descubrir Pontevedra (in Spanish). Pontevedra: Edicións do Cumio. pp. 19–21. ISBN 978-8482890852.
- Saavedra, Segundo (2011). Un corto viaje a Rías Bajas (in Spanish). Madrid: Anaya Touring. p. 42. ISBN 978-84-9776-890-0.
- Villamil y Castro, José. Iglesias gallegas en la Edad Media (in Spanish). La Coruña: Órbigo. p. 410. ISBN 84-934081-5-8.

=== Related articles ===
- Spanish Gothic architecture
- Ruins of San Domingos
- Walls of Pontevedra
- List of Bien de Interés Cultural in the Province of Pontevedra
- Nazarene Chapel

=== External links ===
- Convento de San Francisco – Terras de Pontevedra
- Convento de San Francisco -Turismo Xunta de Galicia
- Never repress anguish and shame by going to the pulpit (gl). Article of Manuel Jabois in the Diario de Pontevedra, 14 January 2009.
