= Elvira Fernández =

Elvira Fernández may refer to:

- Elvira Fernández de Córdoba, 16th-century Spanish noblewoman
- Elvira Fernández, vendedora de tiendas, 1942 Argentine film
- Elvira Fernández (businesswoman) (born 1965), Spanish businesswoman and wife of former Spanish Prime Minister Mariano Rajoy
