= Mariano Rajoy =

Prime Minister of Spain from 2011 to 2018

The Most Excellent Mariano Rajoy
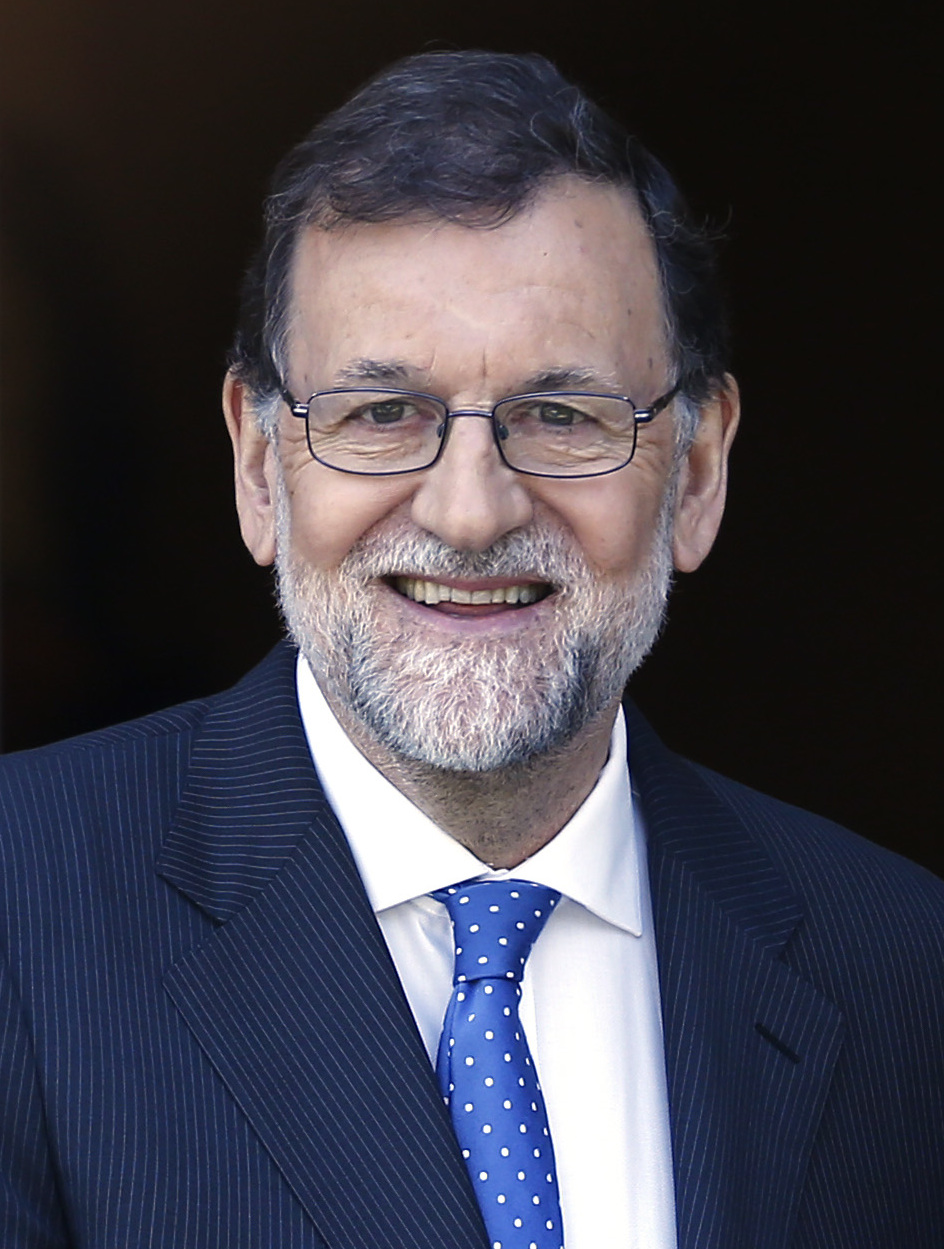
- Rajoy in 2018

Prime Minister of Spain
- In office 21 December 2011 – 1 June 2018
- Monarchs: Juan Carlos I Felipe VI
- Deputy: Soraya Sáenz de Santamaría
- Preceded by: José Luis Rodríguez Zapatero
- Succeeded by: Pedro Sánchez

President of the People's Party
- In office 2 October 2004 – 21 July 2018
- Secretary-General: Ángel Acebes; María Dolores de Cospedal
- Preceded by: José María Aznar
- Succeeded by: Pablo Casado
Other offices held
Leader of the Opposition
In office 2 June 2018 – 21 July 2018
| Monarch | Felipe VI |
| Prime Minister | Pedro Sánchez |
| Preceded by | Pedro Sánchez |
| Succeeded by | Pablo Casado |
In office 17 April 2004 – 21 December 2011
| Monarch | Juan Carlos I |
| Prime Minister | José Luis Rodríguez Zapatero |
| Preceded by | José Luis Rodríguez Zapatero |
| Succeeded by | Alfredo Pérez Rubalcaba |
Secretary-General of the People's Party
In office 4 September 2003 – 2 October 2004
| President | José María Aznar |
| Preceded by | Javier Arenas |
| Succeeded by | Ángel Acebes |
First Deputy Prime Minister of Spain
In office 28 April 2000 – 4 September 2003
| Prime Minister | José María Aznar |
| Preceded by | Francisco Álvarez Cascos |
| Succeeded by | Rodrigo Rato |
Spokesperson of the Government
In office 10 July 2002 – 4 September 2003
| Prime Minister | José María Aznar |
| Preceded by | Pío Cabanillas Gallas |
| Succeeded by | Eduardo Zaplana |
Minister of the Presidency Secretary of the Council of Ministers
In office 10 July 2002 – 4 September 2003
| Prime Minister | José María Aznar |
| Preceded by | Juan José Lucas |
| Succeeded by | Javier Arenas |
In office 28 April 2000 – 28 February 2001
| Prime Minister | José María Aznar |
| Preceded by | Francisco Álvarez Cascos |
| Succeeded by | Juan José Lucas |
Minister of the Interior
In office 28 February 2001 – 10 July 2002
| Prime Minister | José María Aznar |
| Preceded by | Jaime Mayor Oreja |
| Succeeded by | Ángel Acebes |
Minister of Education and Culture
In office 19 January 1999 – 28 April 2000
| Prime Minister | José María Aznar |
| Preceded by | Esperanza Aguirre |
| Succeeded by | Pilar del Castillo (Education, Culture and Sport) |
Minister of Public Administrations
In office 6 May 1996 – 19 January 1999
| Prime Minister | José María Aznar |
| Preceded by | Joan Lerma |
| Succeeded by | Ángel Acebes |
Vice President of Galicia
In office 4 November 1986 – 26 September 1987
| President | Gerardo Fernández Albor |
| Preceded by | José Luis Barreiro |
| Succeeded by | José Luis Barreiro |

Member of the Congress of Deputies
- In office 20 November 1989 – 15 June 2018
- Constituency: Madrid (2004–2018); Pontevedra (1989–2004)
- In office 22 June 1986 – 4 December 1986
- Constituency: Pontevedra

President of the Deputation of Pontevedra
- In office 11 June 1983 – 10 December 1986
- Preceded by: Federico Cifuentes Pérez
- Succeeded by: Fernando García del Valle

Personal details
- Born: Mariano Rajoy Brey; 27 March 1955 (age 71) Santiago de Compostela, Galicia, Spain
- Party: People's (since 1989)
- Other political affiliations: People's Alliance (before 1989); Spanish National Union (1970s)
- Spouse: Elvira Fernández Balboa (m. 1996)
- Children: 2
- Parent(s): Mariano Rajoy Sobredo; Olga Brey López
- Education: University of Santiago de Compostela
- Website: Official website

Mariano Rajoy Brey (Galician: [maɾiˈanʊ raˈʃoj], Spanish: [maˈɾjano raˈxoj]; born 27 March 1955) is a Spanish politician who served as Prime Minister of Spain from 2011 to 2018. A member of the People's Party, he served as the party's president from 2004 to 2018. At a total of nearly 15 years, Rajoy was the longest-serving politician in the Spanish government since the transition to democracy, having held ministerial offices continuously from 1996 to 2004 and from 2011 to 2018.

Born in Santiago de Compostela, Rajoy studied law and graduated from the University of Santiago de Compostela in 1977. In 1979, he became a property register at the age of 24, one of the youngest in Spain at the time. He then entered politics during Spain's transition to democracy, initially as a member of the Regional Government of Galicia. In 1986, Rajoy was elected a member of the Congress of Deputies but shortly resigned his seat later that year to be appointed Vice President of Galicia, a role that he served in until the following year. In the 1989 elections, Rajoy was reelected as a member of the Congress of Deputies and from 1996 to 2004 held several ministers during the Premiership of José María Aznar. In 2004, Rajoy ran as the People's Party for the general election but his party narrowly lost to the Spanish Socialist Workers' Party (PSOE), something repeated in the general elections held four years later. Three years later in 2011, Rajoy won the general elections by a majority and was sworn in as prime minister on 21 December.

Rajoy's first term was heavily marked by the 2008–2014 Spanish financial crisis and oversaw a major restructuring of the Spanish financial system as well as a major labour reform. The financial crisis peaked with a bailout of the Spanish banking system in June 2012. Unemployment in Spain peaked at 27% in 2012, leading to an initial drop of the People's Party in the polls, which was aggravated by the revelations of a series of corruption cases that seriously damaged the party's reputation. This, among other factors, led to a profound shift in the Spanish party system, with the rise of new political parties from the left and the right: Podemos and Citizens. Rajoy also oversaw the 2017–18 Spanish constitutional crisis marked by the Catalan independence referendum of 2017 and the Catalan unilateral declaration of independence on 27 October 2017 that led to the imposition of direct rule in Catalonia.

On 1 June 2018, Rajoy and his government was ousted by the opposition parties led by the opposition leader Pedro Sánchez, the secretary-general of the Spanish Socialist Workers' Party, which only held 84 seats at the time, and Sánchez was sworn in the following day. Four days later, Rajoy resigned as president of the People's Party and retired from politics shortly after and he was succeeded as his party's president by Pablo Casado a month later. While credited for lifting Spain out of the economic crisis, the austerity measures Rajoy and his government took, as well their handling of the Catalonia crisis, were heavily criticized. Corruption scandals in the People's Party further damaged the party and Rajoy's reputation.

== Early life and education ==
Born 27 March 1955 in Santiago de Compostela, in the province of A Coruña, in what is now the Spanish autonomous community of Galicia, Rajoy is the grandson of Enrique Rajoy Leloup, one of the architects of the Galician Statute of Autonomy (1936) (Estatuto de autonomía de Galicia), who was removed from university teaching by the Franco dictatorship in the early 1950s. He is the son of Olga Brey López and Mariano Rajoy Sobredo, a jurist, and president of the Provincial Court of Pontevedra, the city where he grew up. Later on, his father was transferred to León and the whole family moved there. He was duly enrolled, together with his brothers Luis and Enrique, and spent ten years there before moving to the Jesuit school in Vigo. After finishing secondary school he started university, enrolling in the Law Faculty in Santiago de Compostela. Rajoy graduated from the University of Santiago de Compostela, and passed the competitive examination required in Spain to enter into the civil service, becoming the youngest-ever property registrar.

Rajoy was assigned to Padrón (A Coruña), Villafranca del Bierzo (León) and Santa Pola (Alicante), a position he still holds. In that year, Rajoy sustained facial injuries in a traffic accident. Since then, he has always worn a beard to cover the scars from these injuries. Rajoy married Elvira "Viri" Fernández Balboa on 28 December 1996, on La Toja Island (Pontevedra). The couple have two children. While on the campaign trail in 2011, Rajoy published his autobiography, En Confianza (In Confidence).

== Political career ==
=== Early political career ===
Earlier member of the Spanish National Union (UNE), Rajoy joined the right-wing party People's Alliance (AP), becoming a deputy in the inaugural legislature of the Galician Parliament in 1981. In 1982, he was appointed by Galician regional president, Xerardo Fernández Albor, as Minister of Institutional Relations of the Xunta de Galicia. On 11 June 1983, Rajoy was elected President of the Provincial Deputation of Pontevedra, a position he held until 10 December 1986.

In the 1986 Spanish general election, Rajoy won a seat in the Congress of Deputies as the head of the AP's list for Pontevedra, although he resigned in November to take up the post of vice-president of the Xunta of Galicia following the resignation of Xosé Luis Barreiro and the rest of the ministers. He occupied this latter position until the end of September 1987. In May 1988. he was elected General Secretary of the AP in Galicia during an extraordinary congress of the regional party.

When in 1989 the AP merged with other parties to form the People's Party (PP), with Manuel Fraga as its president, Rajoy was named a member of its National Executive Committee and delegate for Pontevedra. He was reelected to parliament in 1993. Before the PP's triumph in the 1996 elections, he was a PP-designated member of the Commission of Parliamentary Control of the RTVE.

In April, the former president of Castile and León and presidential candidate of the government general elections in 1989, José María Aznar, was elected president of the PP. Confirmed in the National Executive, Rajoy was appointed deputy secretary general of the party. He was re-elected in Pontevedra in the election on 6 June 1993.

=== Ministerial career (1996–2003) ===
On 3 March 1996, the PP won the early parliamentary elections and formed a government with the support of the Basque Nationalist Party (EAJ-PNV), Convergence and Union (CiU) and the Canarian Coalition (CC). Rajoy, a long-time associate of newly elected prime minister José María Aznar, made the move into national politics in Aznar's first government when he was appointed Minister of Public Administration on 6 May. His term was marked by the adoption, in 1997, of the Law on organization and operation of the general administration of the State (LOFAGE), which regulates the organization and functions of central government, and the Law on Government. He changed his portfolio on 20 January 1999 and replaced Esperanza Aguirre as Minister of Education and Culture. Just after his appointment, he was reelected vice-secretary general of the PP during its thirteenth national conference.

In 2000, Rajoy led the People's Party election campaign for the elections on 12 March, in which they won absolute majority. On 28 April 2000, Rajoy was appointed First Deputy Prime Minister and Minister of the Presidency. Less than a year later, on 28 February 2001, he replaced Jaime Mayor Oreja, candidate for President of the Government of the Basque Country, as Interior Minister. In this role, he passed legislation including the Organic Law on the right of association, approved the decree implementing the Organic Law on the rights and duties of foreigners, and presented the draft law on the prevention of alcoholism.

In the major cabinet reshuffle of 9 July 2002, Rajoy became minister of the presidency, retained his vice presidency and was appointed spokesman of the government. In his new role, he faced two very difficult times of Aznar's second term: the Prestige oil tanker disaster off the coast of Galicia, and the participation of Spain in the Iraq War, at the request of George W. Bush. Approached, with Rodrigo Rato and Jaime Mayor Oreja, to succeed José Maria Aznar at the direction of the PP and as presidential candidate of the government in the 2004 general elections, he was chosen as future PP leader on 1 September 2003 and left the government two days later.

=== Leader of the People's Party ===
On 30 August 2003, Aznar announced that he would retire from politics in the 2004 elections and proposed Rajoy as his successor. Rajoy was elected Secretary General of the party the following day, and led the party into the 2004 elections. The PP's large lead evaporated in the wake of the 11-M bombings and the subsequent crisis management, and the PP was heavily defeated by the PSOE. However, Rajoy was not held responsible for the defeat, and was elected party president at the PP's 14th congress in October 2004.

=== Leader of the Opposition (2004–2011) ===
==== 2004 election ====
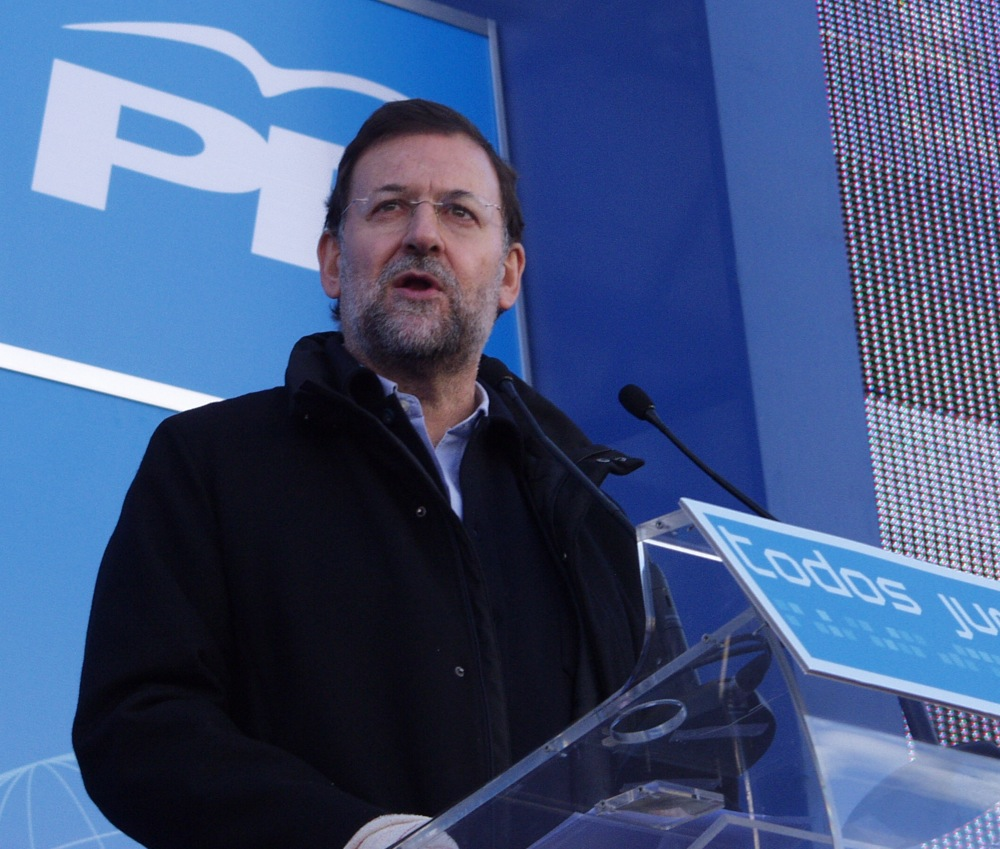
Mariano Rajoy during a party meeting in Bilbao, 2005

On 11 March 2004, three days before the 2004 general elections, Madrid was struck by terrorist attacks, which the government initially blamed on the armed Basque separatist organisation, ETA. Aznar's government and government party leaders insisted on accusing ETA of the attacks, and on 13 March, Rajoy claimed to believe this because he was convinced of their will and capability for committing such crimes. The government was accused of attempting to blame ETA for the attacks in order to stay on track to win the elections (as they were favored to do), but then the Prisa center-left media company broke news that Al‑Qaida, rather than ETA, was responsible.

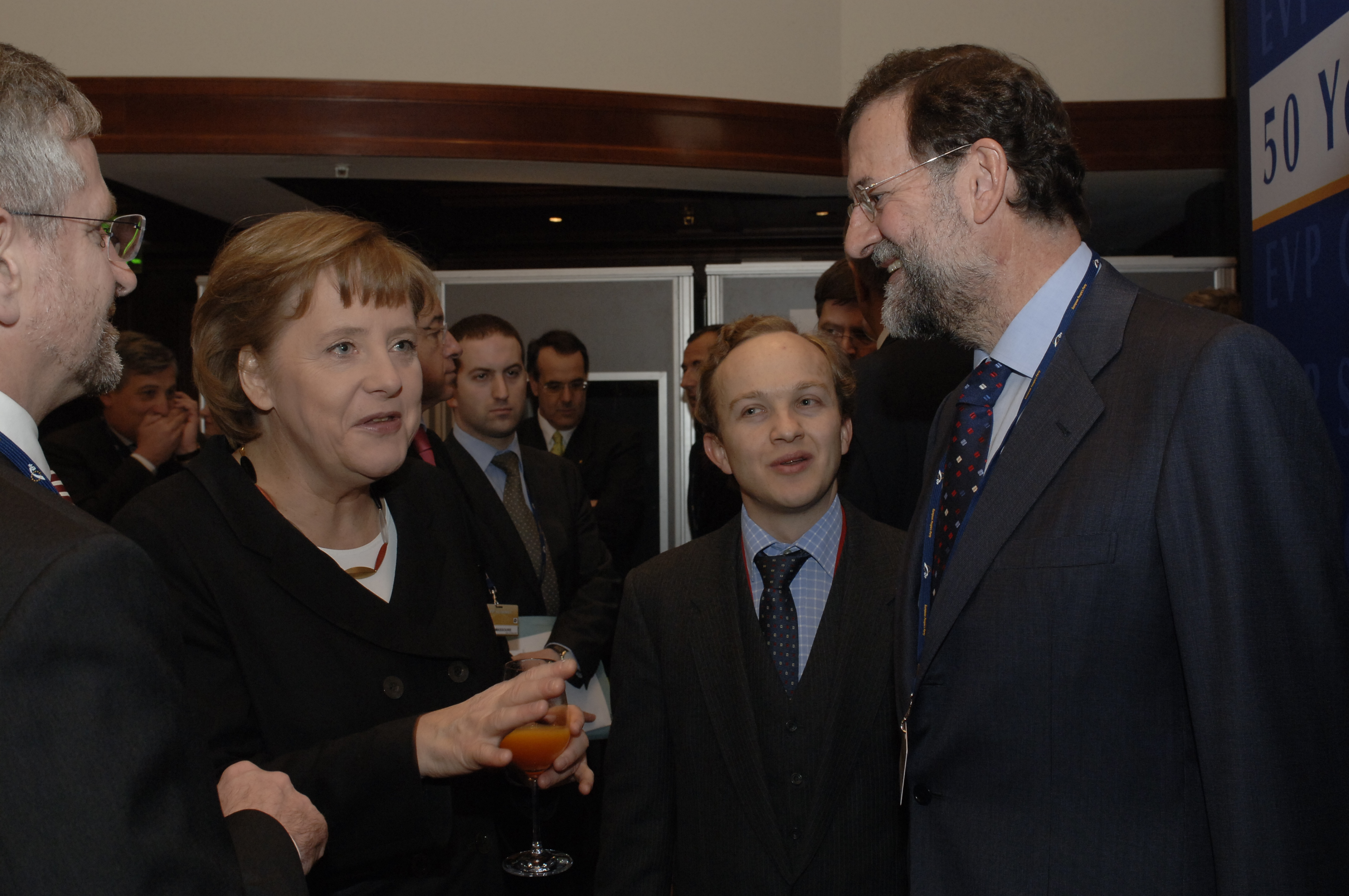
Rajoy with Chancellor of Germany Angela Merkel in March 2007

On 14 March 2004 the PSOE, under the leadership of José Luis Rodríguez Zapatero, won the elections with a majority of 1,300,000 votes over the PP, and obtained 164 deputies, while the PP obtained 9,763,144 votes but 148 deputies, 35 less than they obtained in 2000. Rajoy was elected for the province of Madrid. On 1 December 2005, Rajoy survived a helicopter accident, along with Madrid Regional Government President Esperanza Aguirre; he broke a finger in the accident. His criticisms of the Zapatero administration were focused on what he perceived as:

- The derogation of ambitious plans of the previous executive
- The Plan Hidrológico Nacional (National Hydrological Plan)
- The LOCE Organic Law on the Quality of Education
- The alleged "unnecessary" statutory reforms which devolved competences to the autonomous communities, such as submitted in the Catalan, and Andalusian referendums with low turn-outs. According to Rajoy, some of those reforms constituted concealed changes of the autonomous communities towards a confederation, endangering the integrity of the State
- Zapatero's view of Spain, which, Rajoy proposed, would require a reform of the Spanish Constitution. Such a reform that would need approval in a national referendum.
- The alleged weakness facing the peace process opened as a result of the permanent ceasefire declared by ETA on 30 December 2006, broken by the Madrid Barajas International Airport bombing and arms robbery
- The legalization of abortion until 14 weeks of pregnancy, a law that Mariano Rajoy considered "criminal" and against the will of large sectors of the Spanish society

In foreign policy:

- The alleged cold relations with United States and Poland.
- The alliances with Latin American left-wing leaders: Hugo Chávez, from Venezuela, Fidel Castro, from Cuba and Evo Morales, from Bolivia.

==== 2008 election ====
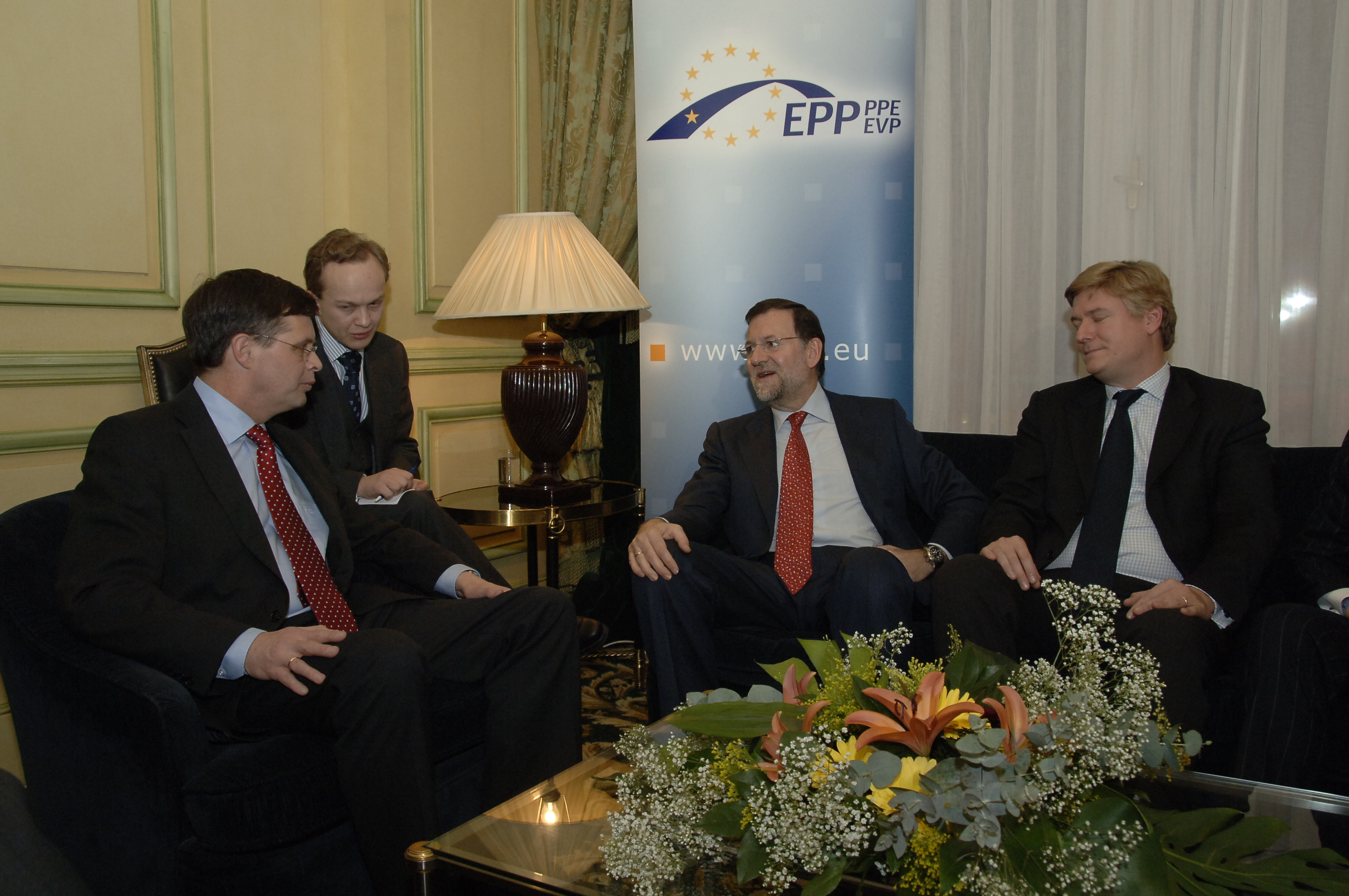
Rajoy at the EPP convention on climate change in February 2008

Rajoy faced a serious situation within his party when he came under public pressure from the electorally successful Alberto Ruiz Gallardón (Madrid's Mayor) to be included in the PP lists for the March 2008 general election. Gallardón represents a more centrist sector within the party, whereas Rajoy, Angel Acebes and Eduardo Zaplana are widely accepted as representing a more conservative wing of the party, closer to Aznar.

Rajoy's final decision was to leave Gallardón out of the list for those elections, an action which provoked concern about the alienation of potential PP voters. Some experts and newspapers even argued that it could cost Rajoy the elections. In any case, the power struggle for succession created a tense situation for him and for the party. On 30 January 2008, Rajoy received the support of Germany's Angela Merkel and France's Nicolas Sarkozy for the March 2008 general election. The PP was defeated in the general election, however, it gained votes and seats, and Rajoy continued to lead his party in opposition.

==== 2011 election ====
The 2011 Spanish general election campaign was dominated by economic issues. "Election campaign begins, crushed by the economic situation", was the headline in El País on 2 September 2011; the same day, El Mundo claimed that "the unemployment election campaign [had begun]". The high rate of unemployment was a major issue in the campaign. Close to 5 million people were out of work at the time of the election, and 1.5 million households had no wage earners.

Rajoy slammed Spain's unemployment rate as "unbearable and unacceptable" as data showed 4,350 people per day losing their jobs in October 2011. The Socialists, he said, "did not know how to manage Spain's economy, and now the Spanish people are paying the price for that". He promised he would shepherd Spain out of its crisis and recover the shaky confidence of international investors and reduce the government's ominously high borrowing costs. The debt crisis in Greece had raised concerns over the solvency of other weak economies like Spain. The PP campaign slogan called on voters to "Join the change!" and the party manifesto stressed its commitment to cutting the country's budget deficit in line with EU requirements. It proposed tax breaks for savers and small firms who hired staff; benefits for those who took on young employees; more flexible labour contracts and wage negotiations and major cuts in red tape, to encourage entrepreneurs to set up businesses. At the same time, it pledged to protect public healthcare and education, saving money through efficiency and better management.

== Premiership (2011–2018) ==
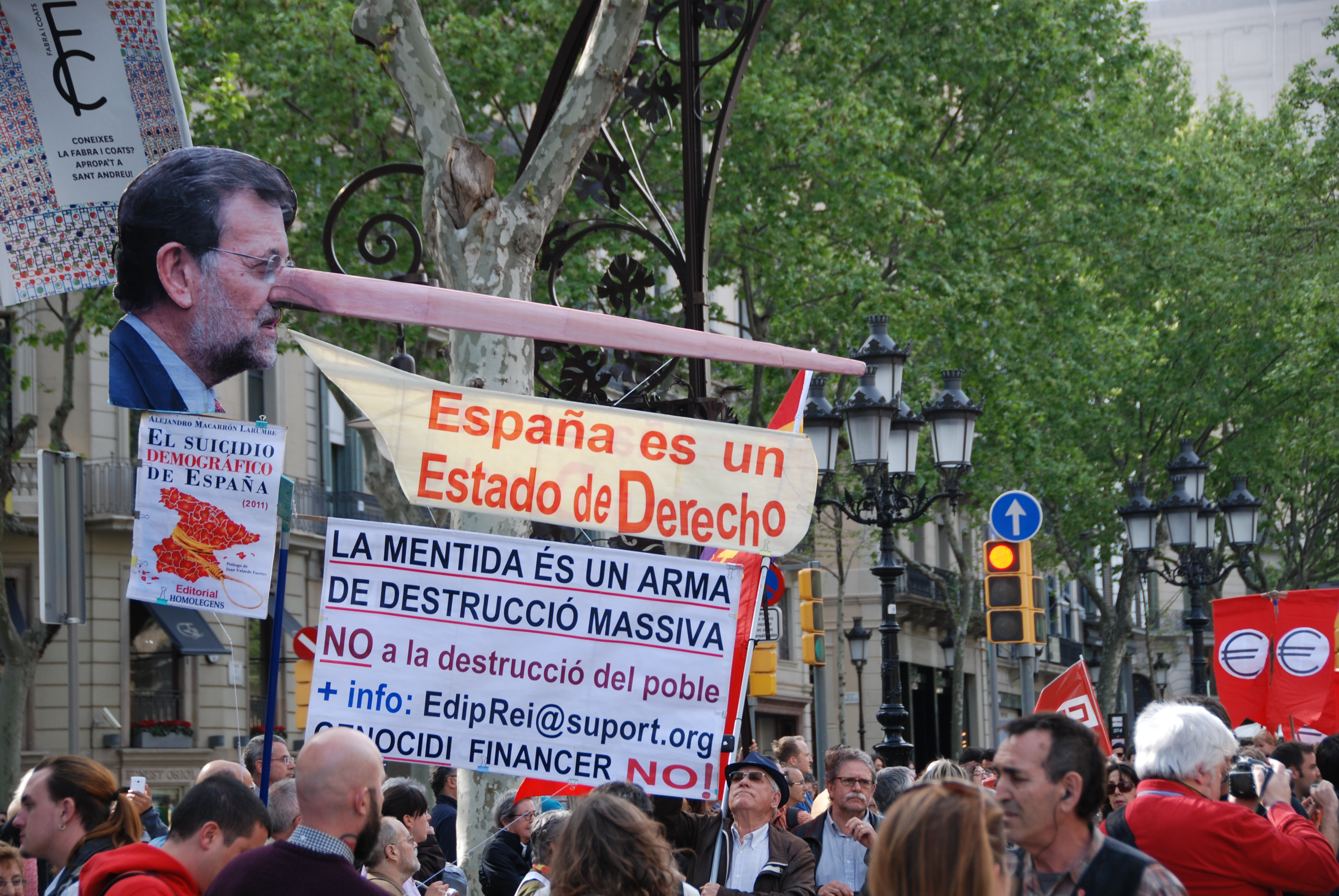
Anti-TTIP protests in Barcelona, 18 April 2015

=== First term (2011–2015) ===
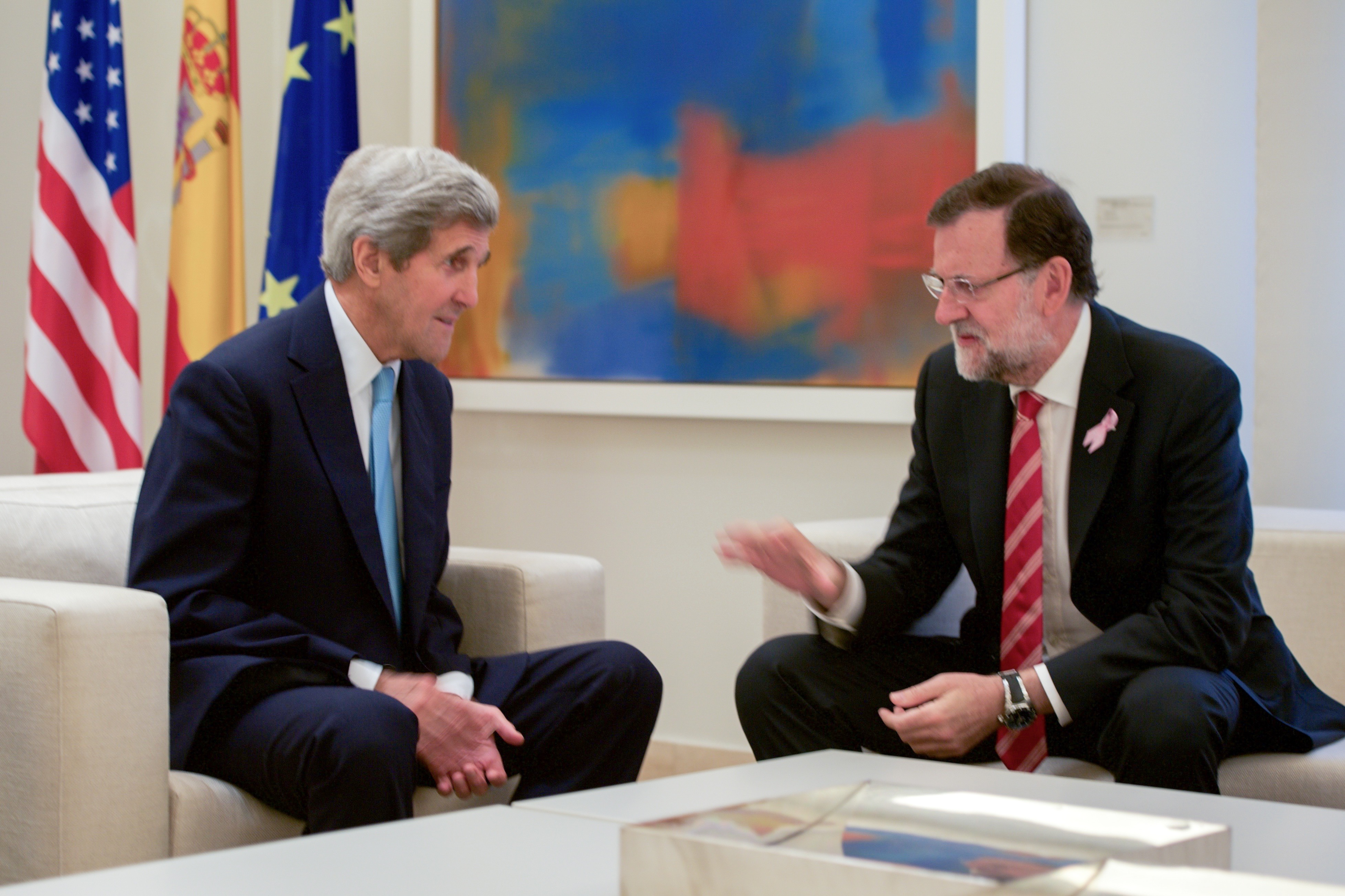
Prime Minister Rajoy meets with U.S. Secretary of State John Kerry

In November 2011, Rajoy's right-wing People's Party won its biggest majority since the country's return to representative democracy in the 1970s, securing 186 out of the 350 seats in the lower house of Parliament. Voters turned to him in hopes of alleviating the pain of Europe's debt crisis. Following the general election held in 2011, Rajoy was elected prime minister by the Congress of Deputies on 20 December 2011.

==== Inauguration ====
Rajoy, designated candidate for Prime Minister of the government of King Juan Carlos I, appeared before the Congress of Deputies on 19 December 2011. He stated that to achieve the objective of a deficit of 4.4% of GDP in 2012, an investment of €16,500,000,000 would be needed. He added that his only increased public spending would be the revaluation of pensions, beginning 1 January 2012, and that he would not create any new jobs in the public sector, except for security forces. He stated an intention "to reduce the size of the public sector" and also wanted to reform public holidays so as to avoid encouragement of popular four-day weekends. This would be accomplished by incorporating the use of the nearest Monday for most public holidays. He also announced his desire to end the practice of early retirement.

Rajoy was chosen by Parliament two days later with 187 votes in favor, 149 votes against and 14 abstentions, receiving the support of the People's Party, the Forum of Asturias (FAC) and the Navarrese People's Union (UPN), with Spanish Socialist Workers Party (PSOE), Convergence and Union (CiU), the United Left (IU) and Union, Progress and Democracy (UPyD) dissenting. The Basque Nationalist Party (PNV), the coalition Amaiur and the Canary Coalition (CC) abstained. He was appointed a few hours later as prime minister by Juan Carlos I and sworn in the next day at the Zarzuela Palace, before the King and Queen, Zapatero, the outgoing prime minister, and the Presidents of the Cortes Generales, and others.

==== First days ====
Rajoy's government was formed on 21 December 2011 with thirteen ministers—the lowest number in Spanish democratic history. Soraya Saenz de Santamaria, Deputy Prime Minister, Minister of the Presidency, and government spokesperson, and Ana Pastor Julián, Minister of Equipment, were appointed. The Ministries of Culture, Science, and Territorial Policy were ended, and the Ministry of Economy and Finance was split into two new ministries. The Ministry of Agriculture and Environment was kept intact, despite statements made by Rajoy speech before Congress that indicated the opposite intention. Among the ministers, Cristóbal Montoro Romero, Minister of Finance, and Miguel Arias Cañete, Minister of Agriculture, Food and Environment, had been members of the previous Aznar government and continued to occupy the same posts.

==== Spending cuts ====
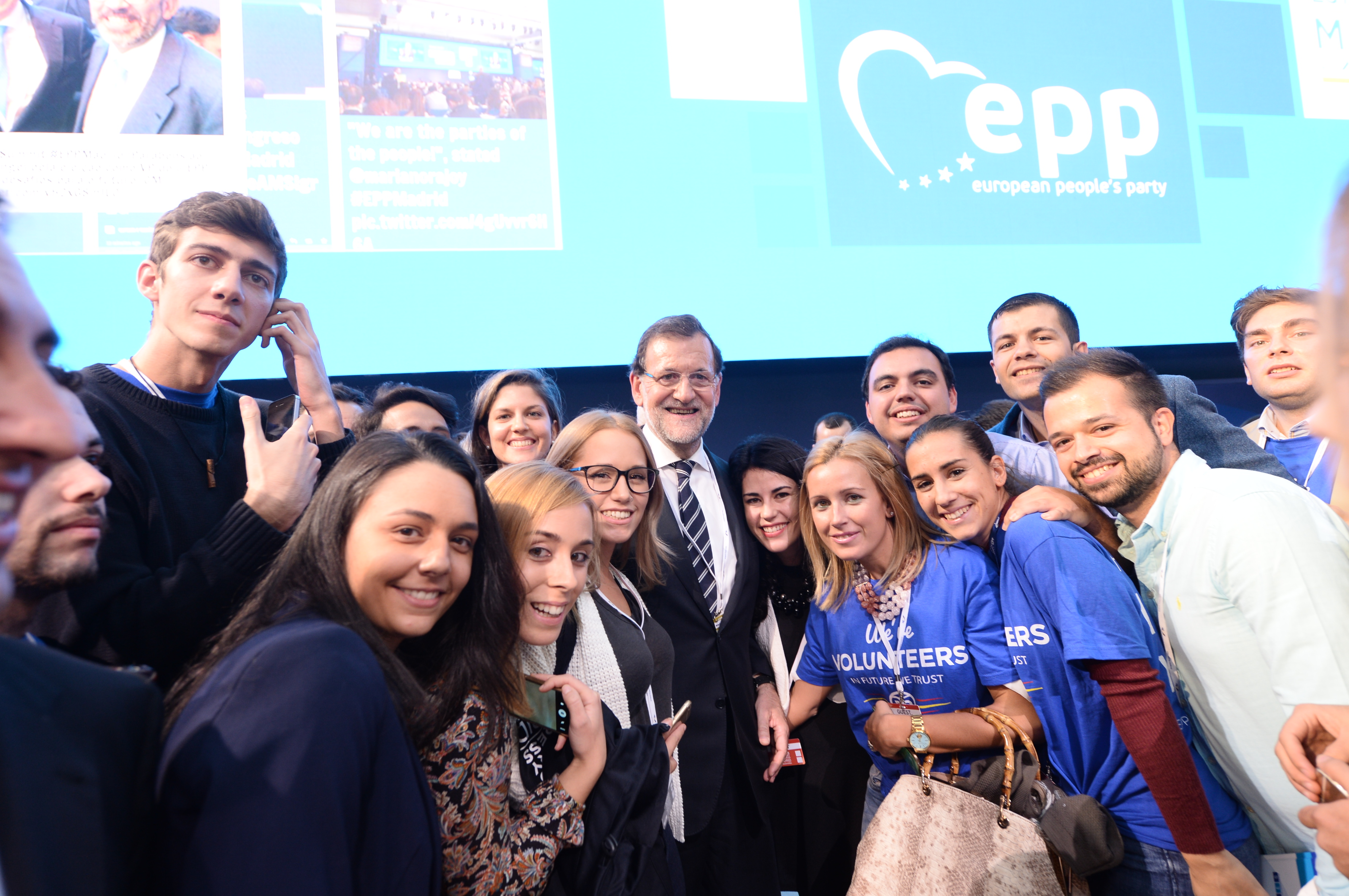
Rajoy in the 2015 PP Congress

On 30 December 2011, the Council of Ministers approved a cuts plan (called an austerity plan) amounting to €8,900,000,000 in savings and €6,200,000,000 in new revenues. Salaries of public workers were frozen, the workweek in public administration was reduced to 37.5 hours, and recruitment of new public employees was halted, except in the areas of security, health and education. A programme which provided rent assistance for young people was abolished, and the minimum wage was frozen—something that had not happened since 1966. The income tax and tax on real estate was also increased for 2012 and 2013. Pensions were adjusted up 1%, however, and the tax deduction for the purchase of homes was reinstated. The premium of €400 for the long-term unemployed (due to a lack of industry) at the end of law was maintained but only for those registered as jobseekers with the public employment service for at least twelve months out of the previous eighteen and whose income amounts were less than three quarters of the net minimum wage. A 4% value-added tax was expanded to include new home purchases.

==== Lawsuit ====
On 4 January 2013 the association Democracia Real Ya (DRY), created after the 15 May 2011 protest movement, brought charges against Mariano Rajoy and another 62 deputies (including four ministers) before the Supreme Court, accusing them of diversion of public funds and misappropriation. Mariano Rajoy was accused of receiving a subsistence allowance despite the fact that he was living in the Moncloa Palace in Madrid. The lawsuit before the Supreme Court was a consequence of the data which had appeared in the media providing information about several deputies who had houses in Madrid but at the same time were receiving extra funds for lodging. According to the association DRY, these representatives, who could be lodged at no cost to the public purse, were paid a monthly subsistence allowance valued at €1,823.36. Furthermore, if they had been elected by the constituency of Madrid and had a house in this city, they were allowed €870 a month to cover accommodation and food expenses resulting from the exercise of their functions that, with respect to Rajoy, were already covered – from the state budget – in the Moncloa Palace. DRY therefore accused them of diversion of public funds and misappropriation. Additionally, DRY demanded that they return all the money that didn't belong to them, particularly bearing in mind that "the cuts are making most Spaniards' life a misery".

On 24 April 2013, having found no irregularity in the existing regulation and discarding the existence of constituents elements of offense, the Supreme Court rejected the lawsuit.

==== Corruption scandals ====
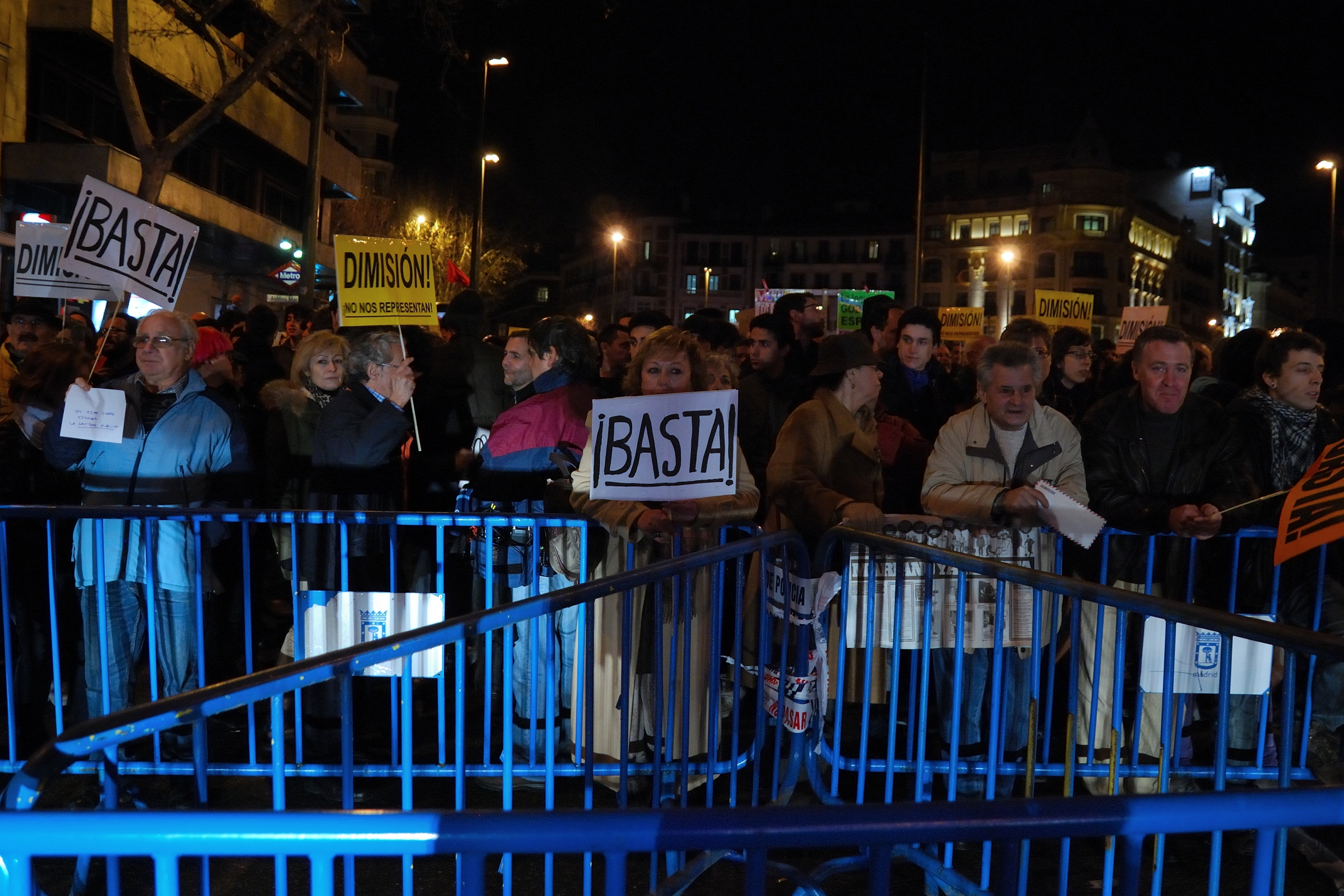
Demonstration in front of the People's Party headquarters protesting against the Barcenas' affair (2 February 2013).

The newspaper El País published in its edition of 30 January 2013 a series of documents, under the title of "Bárcenas' secret papers", referring to the accounts of the conservative party from 1999 to 2009. According to those hand-written documents, Mariano Rajoy and María Dolores de Cospedal had received extra payments in "black" money from the former treasurer of the People's Party, Luis Bárcenas. These documents state that both Bárcenas and his predecessor, Álvaro Lapuerta, managed cash donations from businessmen and private builders (three of whom are additionally accused in the Gürtel affair), cited as sources of undeclared income of the PP. Expenditure included, apart from allocations for the effective functioning of the party, payments made to members of the leadership of the party during those years with no explicitly stated purpose. Barcenas' accounts show yearly payments of 25,200 euros for 11 years to the President, in addition to smaller amounts for a total estimated at 33,207 with purposes such as "Mariano's suits", "Mariano's ties", or "M.R.'s suits". PP Secretary-General María Dolores de Cospedal appears in the papers of these payments, as well as other leaders, such as former ministers Javier Arenas, Jaime Mayor Oreja and Francisco Álvarez-Cascos. By 7 February, just one week after publication of the documents, one million people had signed a petition launched by the organization Change.org asking for the immediate resignation of Mariano Rajoy.

On 8 July, the center-right newspaper El Mundo, usually a support of the Popular Party, published a four-hour interview with Luis Bárcenas, which had taken place a few days before he was put behind bars on 27 June, in which the former party treasurer revealed that the People's Party had been illegally financed for 20 years. The following day, the same newspaper published the originals of Barcenas' papers which reflected overpayments to Mariano Rajoy in 1997, 1998 and 1999, when he was a minister in the Aznar cabinet. These payments violated the Incompatibilities Act of 1995. On 14 July, El Mundo published several text messages between Rajoy and Bárcenas, the latest dating from early 2013, after the discovery of Bárcenas' bank accounts in Switzerland and after some media had pointed to illegal payments within the PP. In those messages, Rajoy expressed his support to Bárcenas and asked him to keep quiet.

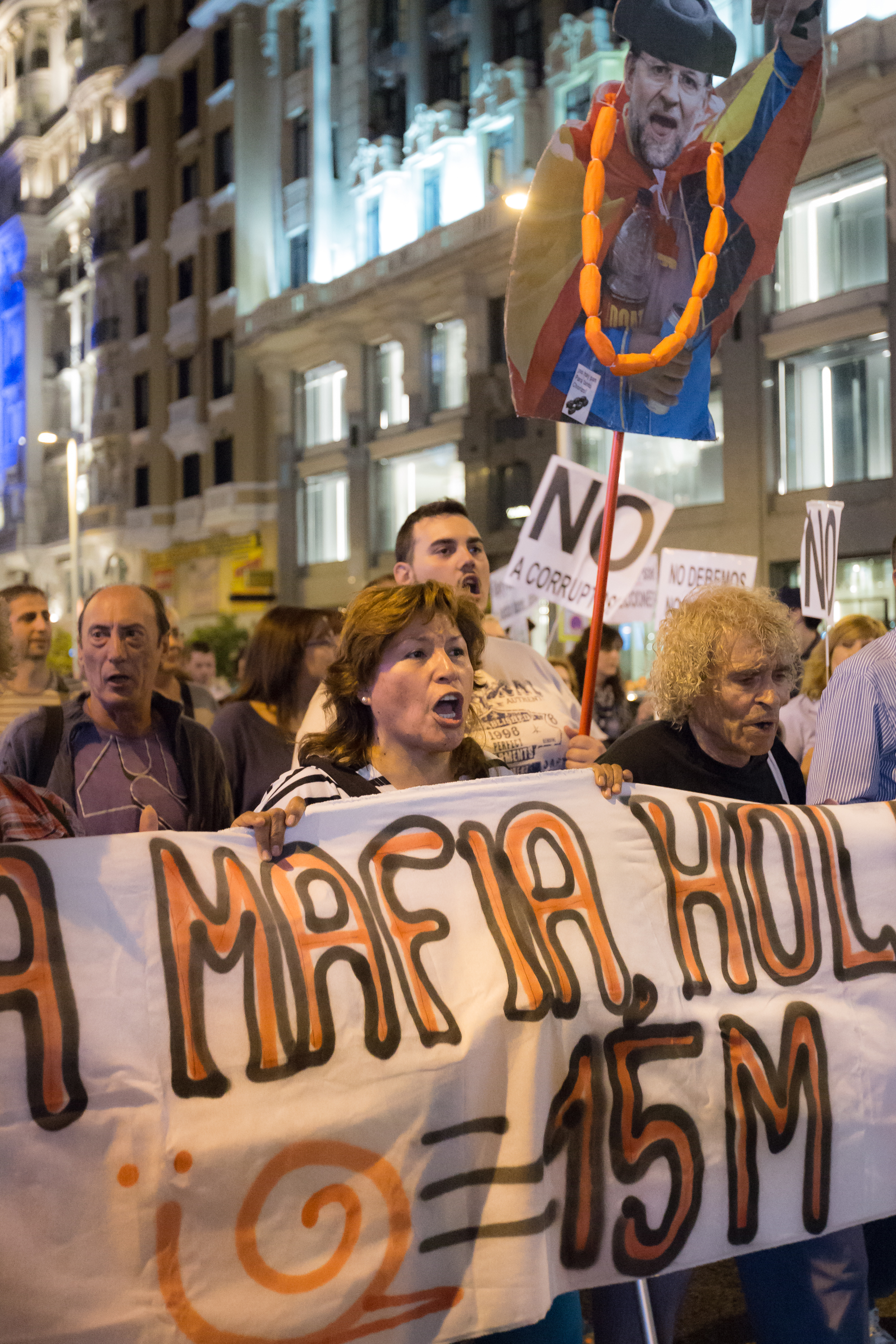
Anti-corruption rally in Madrid, 5 October 2013

In light of these new revelations, High Court judge Pablo Ruz summoned Bárcenas to appear before him on 15 July. In this new appearance, Bárcenas admitted the payment of 50,000 euros in 2010 to Rajoy and Dolores de Cospedal. As a result of the scandal, all the opposition parties urged Rajoy to give an explanation to parliament, with the opposition Spanish Socialist Workers' Party threatening him with a censure motion should he refuse to come out and explain himself, and demanding his immediate resignation.

In his appearance before Congress, on 1 August, Rajoy admitted that he had made "a mistake" in trusting Bárcenas and criticised the opposition for trying to "criminalize" him by believing the word of an "offender", stating that he wasn't resigning nor calling new elections. Rajoy also stated that Bárcenas was no longer a member of the PP when he, Rajoy, was appointed prime minister (in December 2011). However, on 11 August, El Mundo published a paysheet, dated May 2012, issued by the PP for the ex-treasurer, as well as a letter sent by Bárcenas himself to Rajoy in April 2010 (just a few days after he [Bárcenas] had been officially "removed" from his duties as treasurer) informing Rajoy of his "re-incorporation" in the party. On 26 November 2014, Ana Mato, Minister of Health, resigned due to the involvement of herself and her husband Jesús Sepúlveda in the Gürtel affair.

Rajoy testified in Audiencia Nacional as a witness in the framework of the investigation into the Gürtel corruption scandal, of the illegal financing of his party. He is the first PM in Spain in service to attend a trial. Although he benefited from this corruption scheme, he denied any knowledge. This situation prompted a no-confidence motion against Rajoy's government, which was debated on 13 June and defeated as expected on 14 June. Pío García-Escudero, the President of the Senate also testified as a witness in the same investigation. On 26 April 2018, his former Minister of Justice, Alberto Ruiz Gallardón, was imputed by the judge for his involvement in the corruption scandal Case Lezo, which involves leaders of the PP in the Community of Madrid.

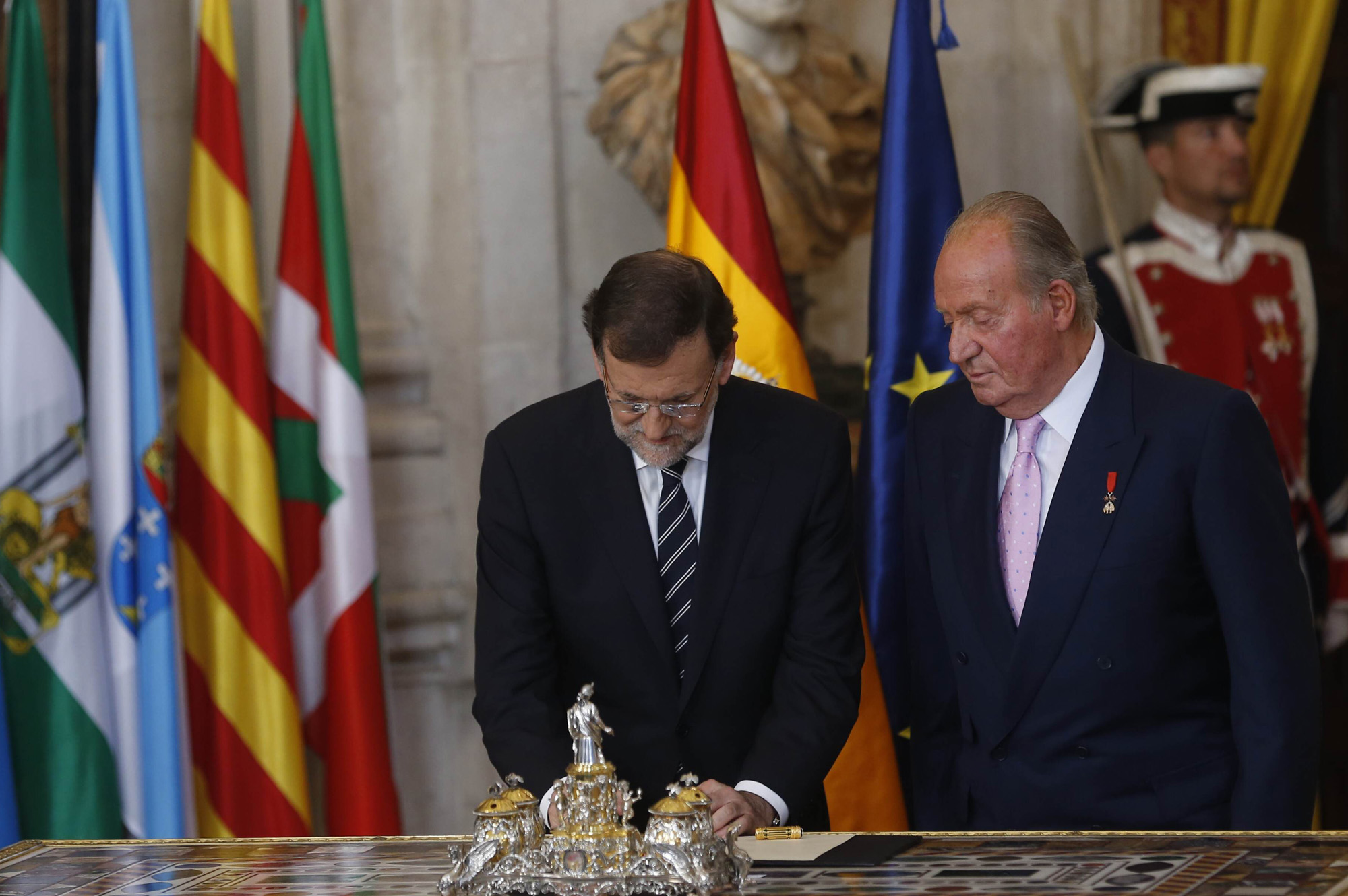
Rajoy is countersigning the organic law for the abdication of King Juan Carlos I (18 June 2014).

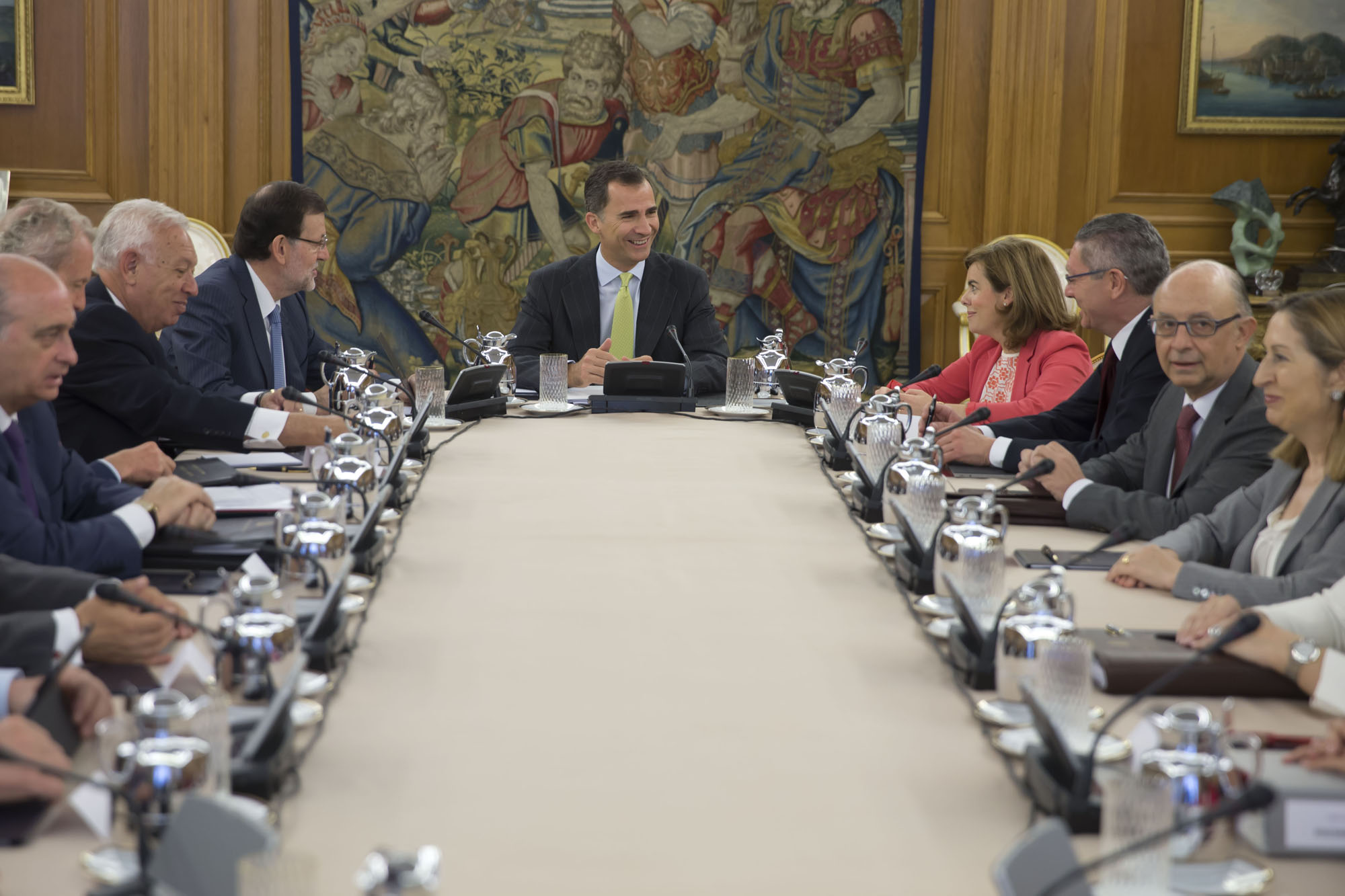
Felipe VI chairing his first Council of Ministers at direct request of Rajoy, an extraordinary responsibility to which the Monarch is entitled according to the article 62 of the Spanish Constitution (18 July 2014).

=== 2015 general election and deadlock ===
The 2015 Spanish general election was held on 20 December, the latest possible day. The result was that the People's Party remained the most voted-for party, but it lost 64 of its 187 seats and thus its majority. The election produced a fragmented parliament and an uncertain political situation that led to another election in 2016, as neither Rajoy nor the left-wing opposition could form a coalition government. During the electoral campaign, on 16 December, he was punched in the face by a teenager, breaking his glasses. All the political parties, unanimously, condemned the attack.

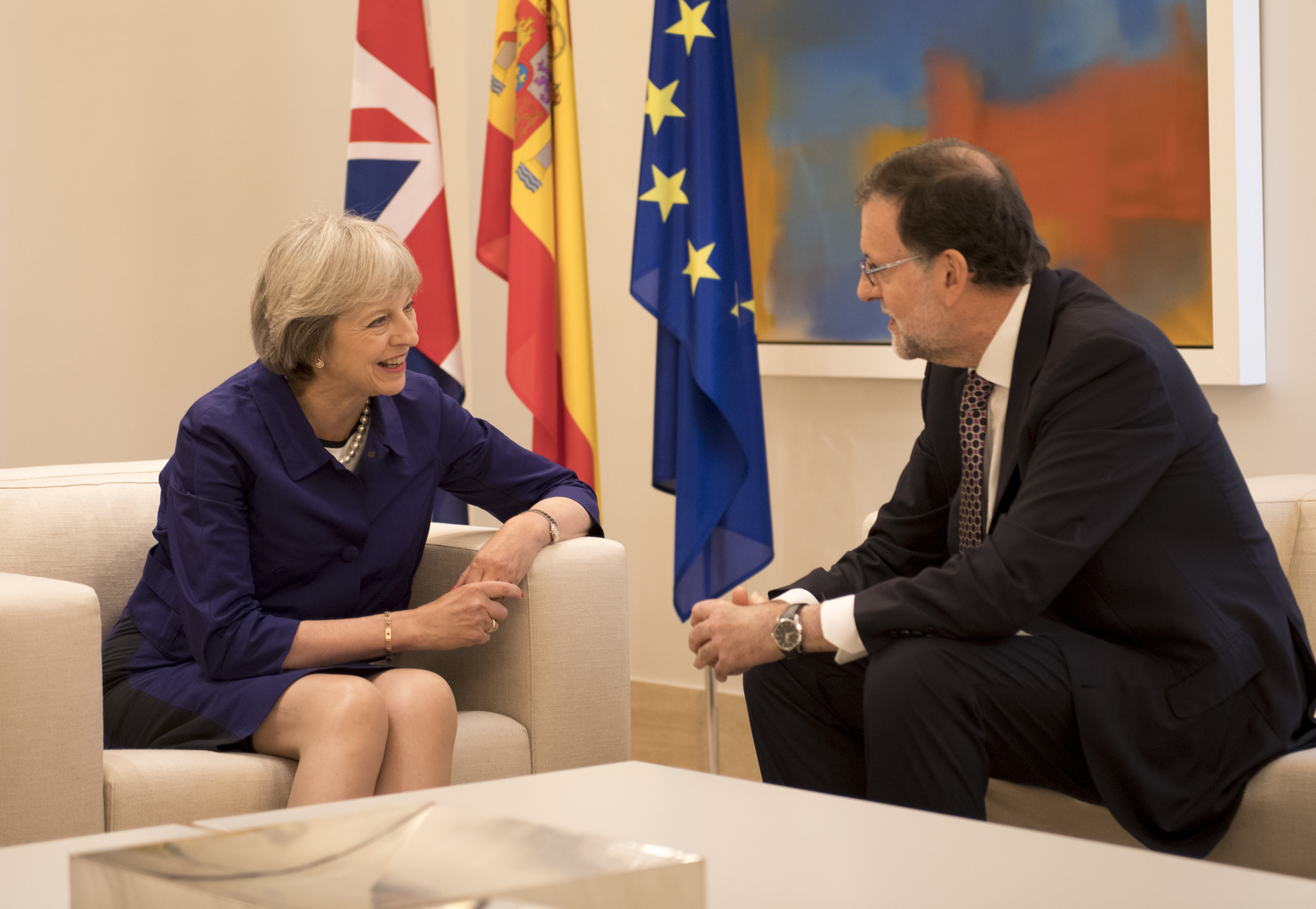
Rajoy with British prime minister Theresa May on 13 October 2016

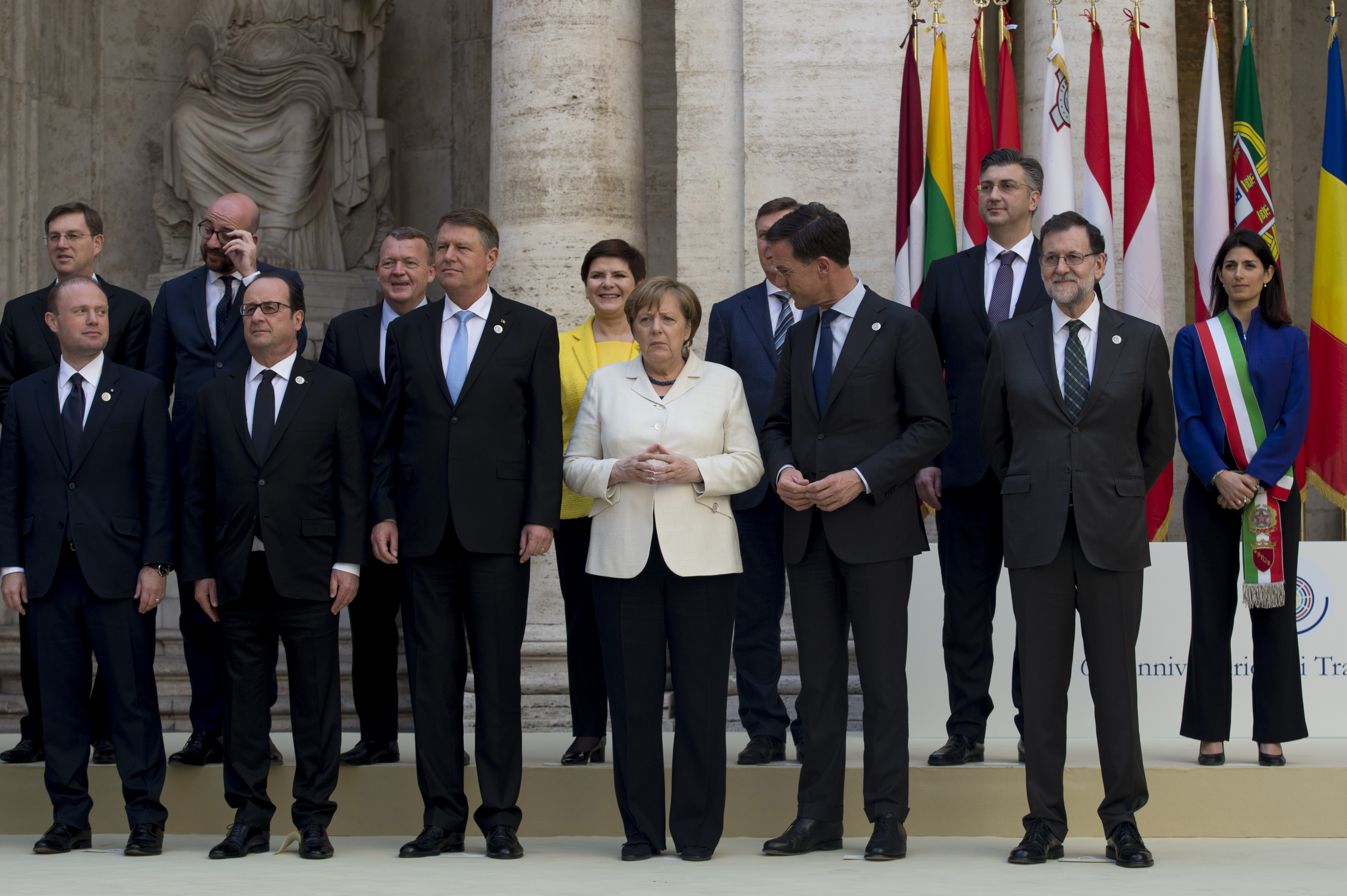
Rajoy during a ceremony to mark the 60th anniversary of the signing of the Treaty of Rome on 25 March 2017

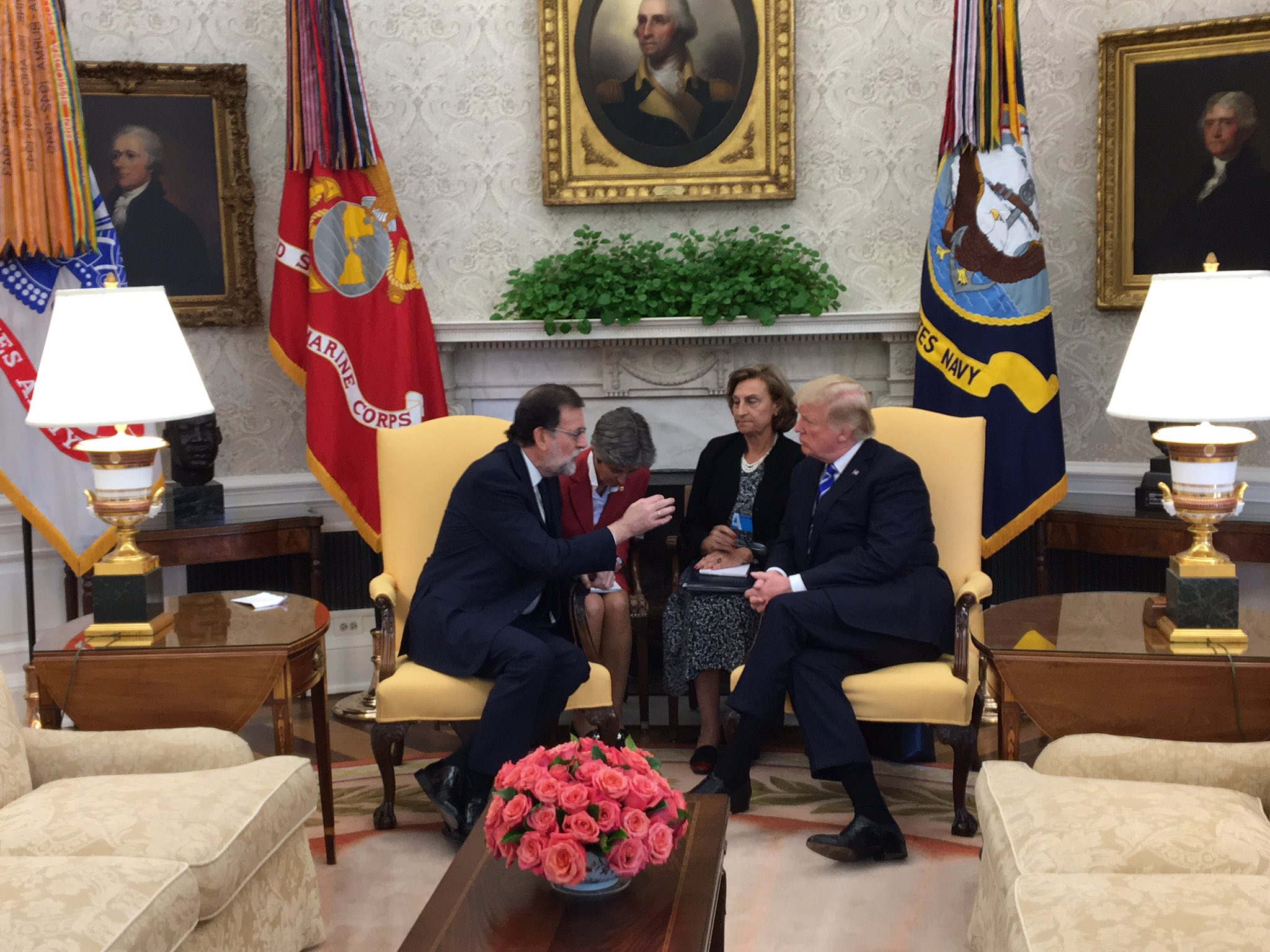
Rajoy with U.S. President Donald Trump on 26 September 2017

=== Second term (2016–2018) ===
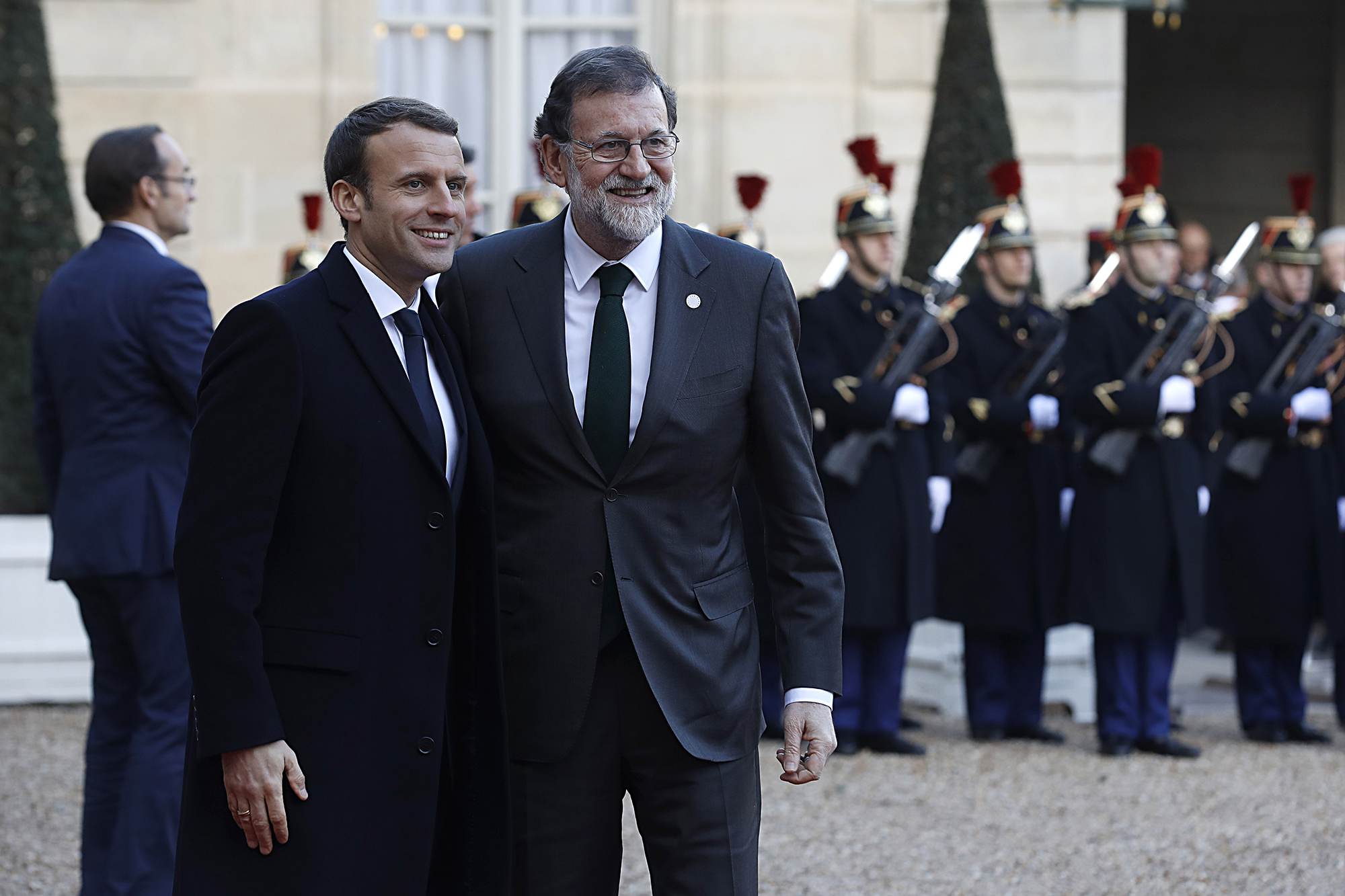
Rajoy with French president Emmanuel Macron on 12 December 2017

==== 2016 general election ====
In the general election of 26 June 2016, the PP increased its number of seats in parliament, while still falling short of an overall majority. Eventually on 29 October Rajoy was re-appointed as prime minister, after the majority of the PSOE members abstained in the parliamentary vote rather than oppose him. In February 2016, Rajoy was declared 'persona non grata' of Pontevedra, his adopted city, because of his cabinet's decision to extend the operating license of a controversial cellulose factory by 60 years (see List of people declared persona non grata).

==== 2017 witness and no confidence-motion ====
On 26 July, Rajoy was due to appear as a witness in the Gürtel trial. This situation prompted a no-confidence motion against Rajoy's government, which was debated on 13 June and defeated as expected on 14 June.

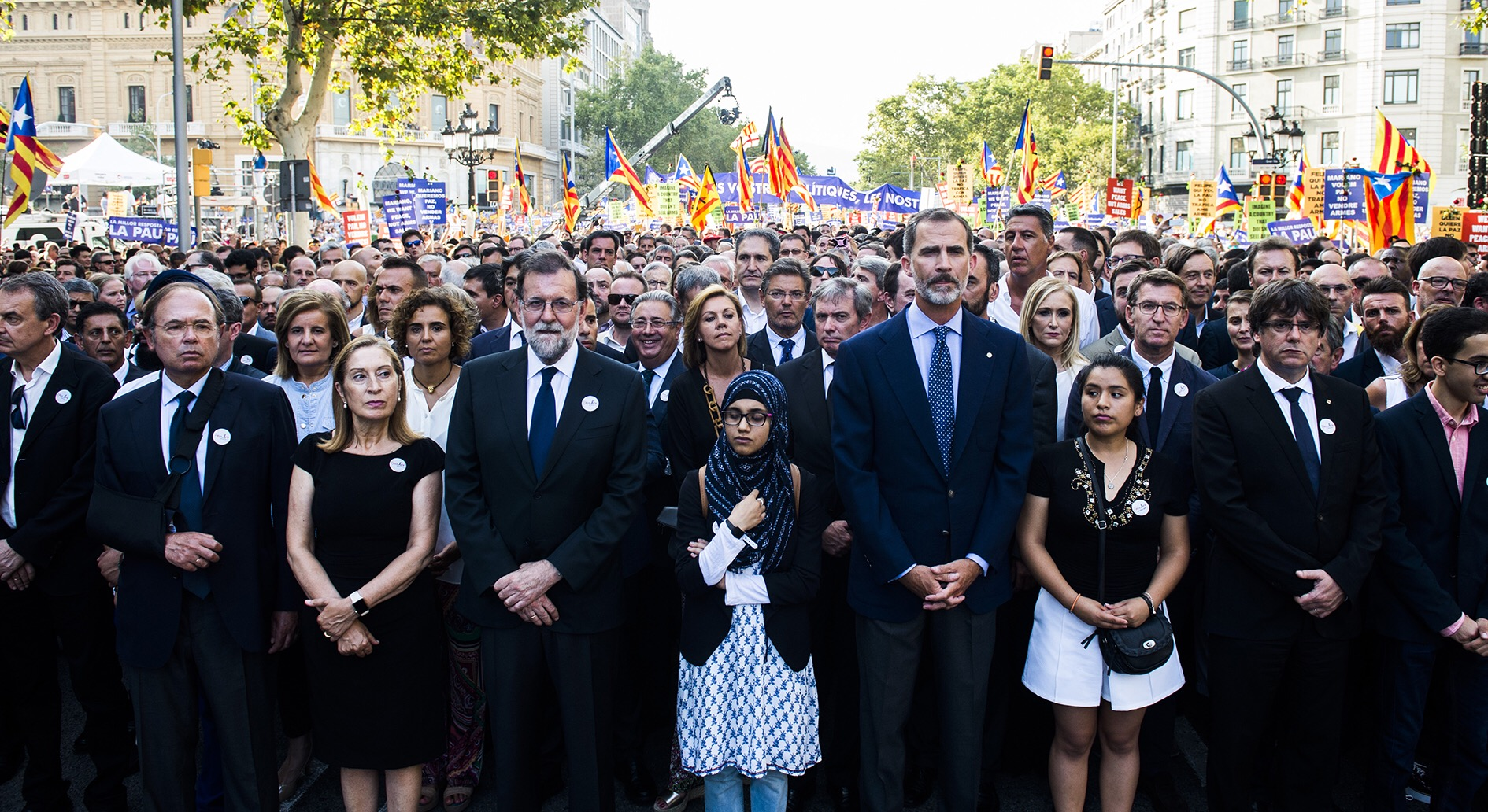
Rajoy, Spanish King Felipe and Catalan President Carles Puigdemont attended the Barcelona rally in response to terror attacks in August 2017

==== Terrorist attacks in Barcelona and Cambrils ====
On the afternoon of 17 August 2017, Younes Abouyaaqoub murdered 15 people and wounded 130 in an attack on Las Ramblas in Barcelona through vehicle-ramming attack and stabbed one person while fleeing. Few hours later, five men from the same terrorist cell drove into pedestrians in Cambrils, a coastal town one hour from Barcelona. One woman was fatally stabbed and six persons injured. All five attackers were killed by the police.

==== Catalan independence referendum ====
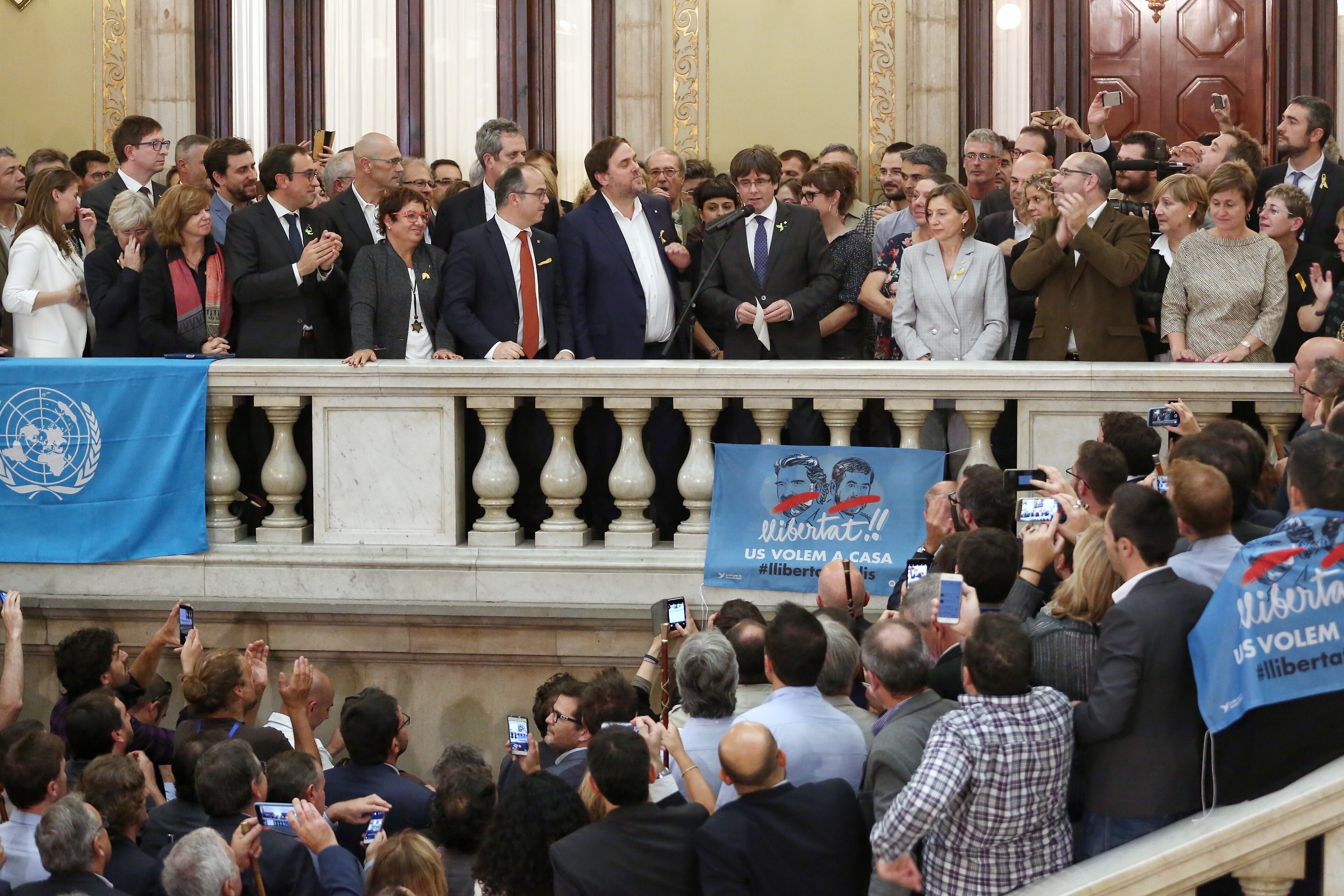
Catalan president, Carles Puigdemont, addresses to the crowd following the unilateral declaration of independence on 27 October

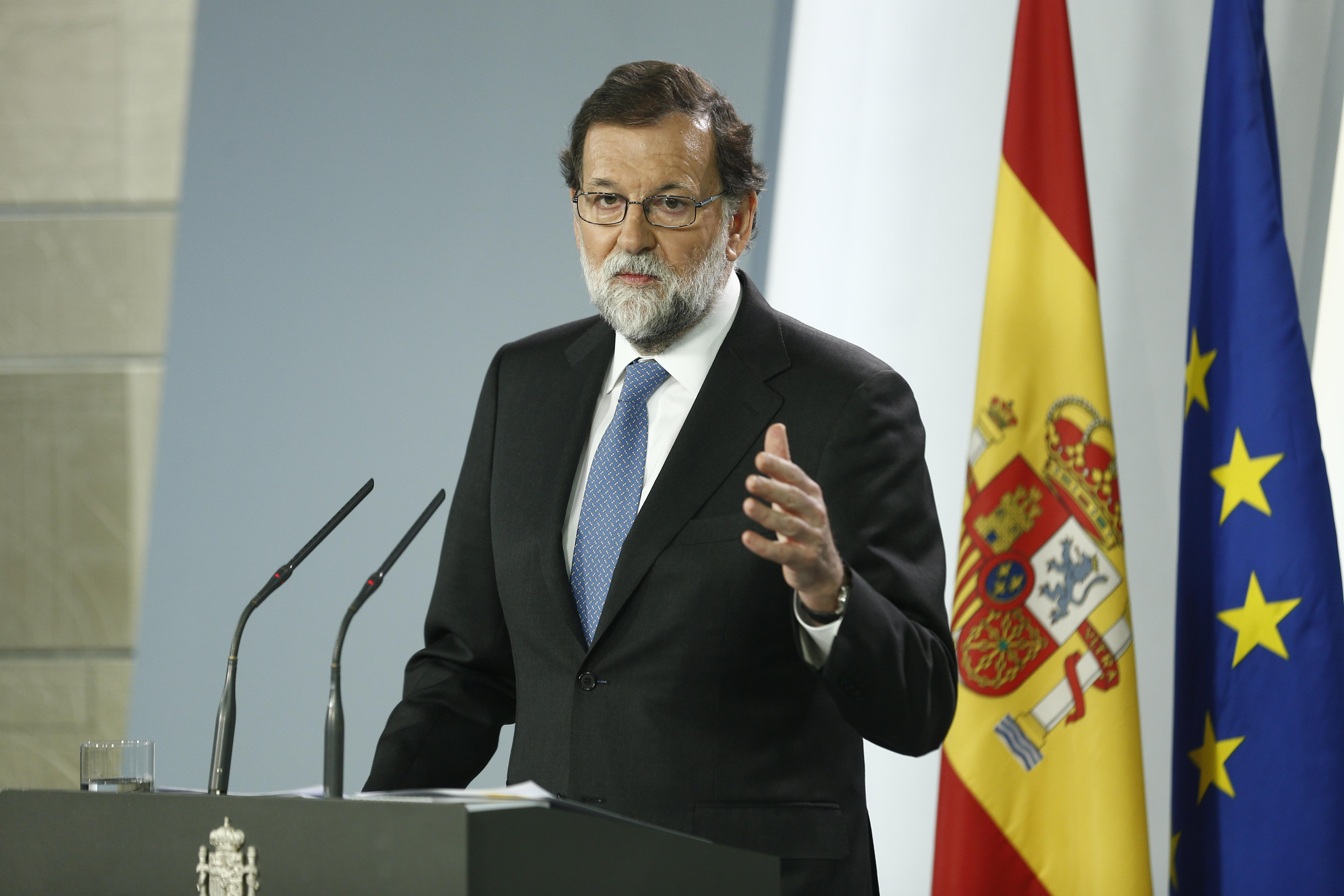
Rajoy announcing the effects of the direct rule and the call for regional elections for 21 December.

On 1 October 2017, an illegal referendum took place in Catalonia that descended into chaos after the police attempted to halt voting by forcibly and violently removing voters from polling stations. Although Governments around the world refused to acknowledge the legitimacy of the vote, Rajoy was widely criticized by political analysts around the world for his response, with most suggesting that he should simply have ignored the referendum. Rajoy oversaw the 2017-18 Spanish constitutional crisis marked by this referendum, and the Catalan unilateral declaration of independence that led to the imposition of direct rule in Catalonia on 27 October 2017.

==== 2018 motion of no confidence ====
The first definitive court ruling on the Gürtel affair convicted a series of former PP party officials. Former treasurer Luis Bárcenas was sentenced to 33 years of prison and a fine of 44 million euros for hiding a fortune of an uncertain amount in Swiss banks. The 1,687-page ruling also said that it was settled that there was a "network of institutionalised corruption" and that the PP "financially benefited" from the Gürtel affair, something for which it was fined 245,492 euros. The sentence also recognised that it was proven that the PP had a slush fund since 1989, consisting of a "financial and accounting structure that was parallel to the official one". More court rulings are pending, as this ruling only covered the 1999-2005 period of the Gürtel scandal.

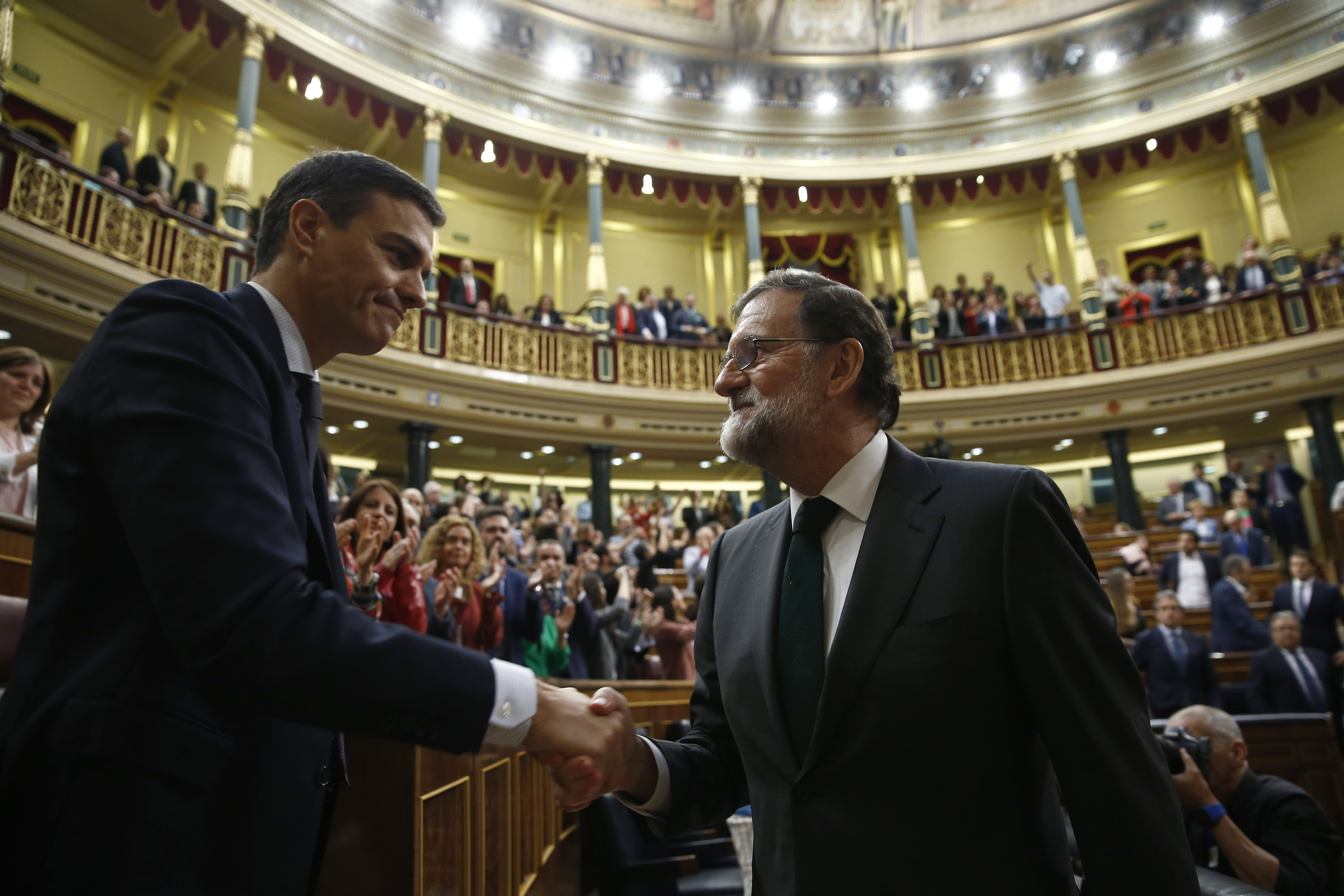
Rajoy congratulates Sánchez on his successful no-confidence motion.

Following the court ruling, the leader of PSOE, Pedro Sánchez, promoted a motion of no confidence against Rajoy to be voted on 1 June. 176 votes were needed to get it approved. In the debate of the previous day, a sufficient number of deputies expressed their intention to support it. Rajoy lost this motion (with 180 votes in favour of the motion, 169 against, and 1 abstention), was forced to resign, and was succeeded as prime minister by Sánchez. On 5 June 2018, Rajoy announced his resignation as President of the People's Party. On 15 June, he resigned his seat as Deputy after thirty years. The vacant seat was taken by Valentina Martínez Ferro.

== Later activity ==
On 20 June 2018, Rajoy was reinstated to his position as property registrar in Santa Pola after 29 years. On 27 February 2019 he was declared a witness at the trial of Catalonia independence leaders before the Supreme Court.

Rajoy was summoned by the courts in March 2021 to explain the "B fund" that the PP has allegedly maintained for more than 20 years. This would have been used to receive anonymous donations from business leaders in order to pay "additional salaries" to party executives, including "Mariano" and "M. Rajoy".

Rajoy supported Javier Milei in the 2023 Argentine general election. He drew condemnation during the 2026 FIFA World Cup after declaring that France, who were playing Spain in the semi-finals, "don't have any French players". The comments were criticised by Spanish prime minister Pedro Sánchez and French interior minister Laurent Nuñez, among others. Rajoy refused to apologise.

== Political positions ==
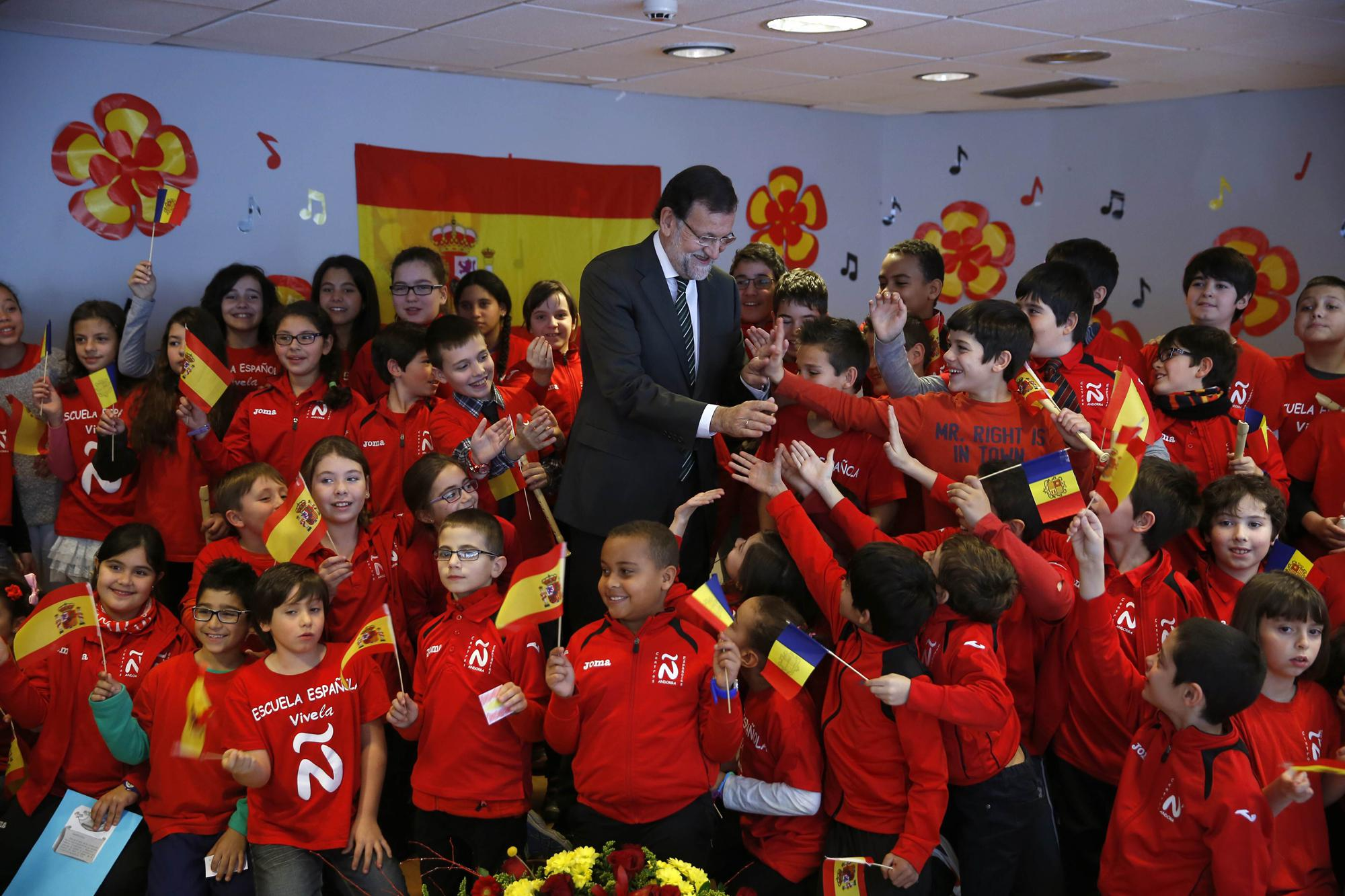
Rajoy visiting Andorra in 2015

=== Social issues ===
==== Immigration ====
Rajoy declared himself a strong supporter of allowing migrants to enter Spain, saying Spain would support those seeking asylum. In 2015, he criticised the Hungarian government for taking steps to deter migration into their country. Despite making these statements, the Government of Rajoy was highly criticized for taking anti-immigration measures such as cutting budget to immigration observatories, and the reinforcement of the fence of Melilla, with highly criticised "hot returns" - the illegal expulsion of migrants by the police without any legally established procedures or meeting the international obligations - with police violence eventually taking place. These acts were condemned by the European Court of Human Rights and the UN. The following months, the Rajoy executive refused to repeal the hot returns and appealed the sentence of Strasbourg.

==== Bullfighting ====
Rajoy is a strong supporter of bullfighting. He has said that "the tradition is an art form deeply rooted in Spanish history". He lifted the ban on live bullfights on state-run television and they are once again shown in the traditional 6 pm slot on TVE.

==== History ====
During the 2015 election campaign, Rajoy asserted that the PP "was the only party defending the unity of Spain." Among his electoral promises was the creation of a National Museum of Spanish History intended to "defend the unity of Spain." The location chosen for making this announcement left little doubt about the nationalist undertones of that proposal: the site of the Battle of Covadonga, in the northwestern region of Asturias. That battle is recognized as the first triumph by Christian military forces after the Muslim conquest of the Iberia Peninsula in 711–718. As befits this accomplishment, historians usually consider Covadonga as the site of the beginning of the Reconquista, or the "reconquest" of the Iberian Peninsula by Christian rulers.

=== Foreign policy ===
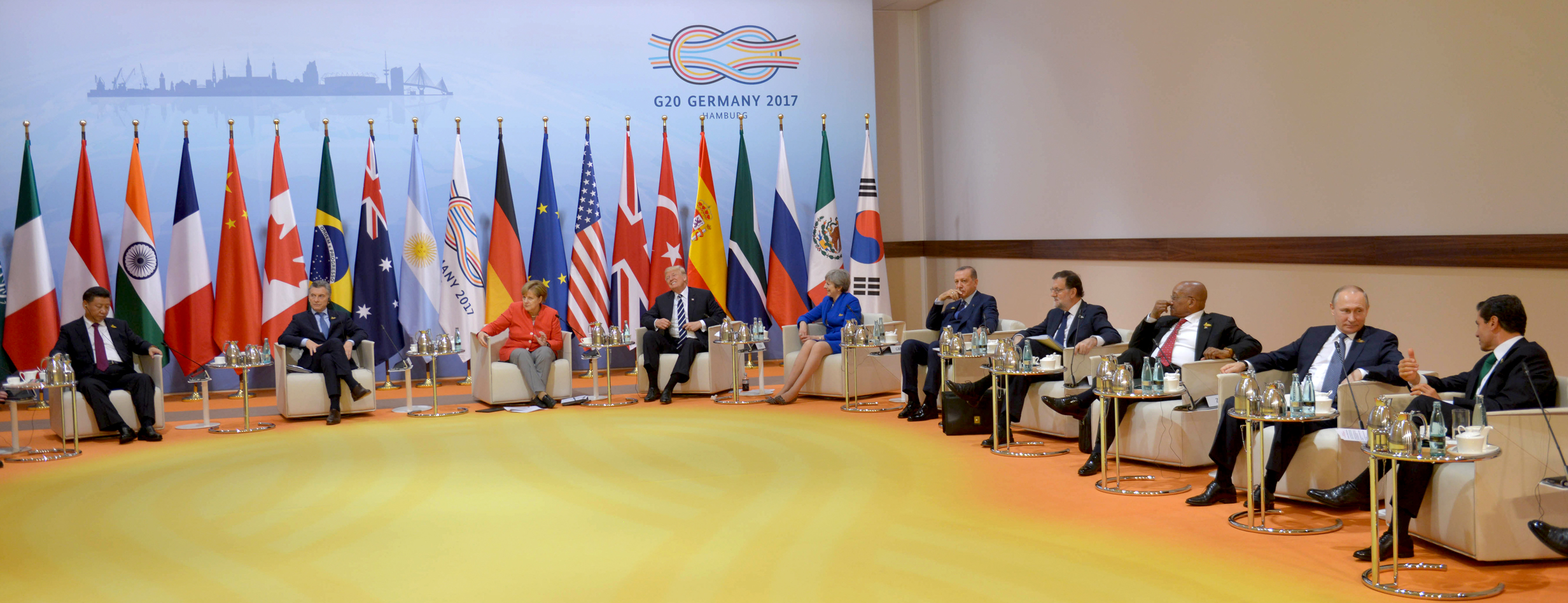
Rajoy at the G20 summit in Hamburg, 7–8 July 2017

==== Gibraltar ====
Rajoy wants British-controlled Gibraltar returned to Spain. He described Gibraltar as an "anachronism", and "the last colony in Europe".

==== Scottish independence ====
Scotland held a referendum on independence from the United Kingdom on Thursday 18 September 2014. In November 2013, Rajoy stated that an independent Scotland would have to reapply for membership of the European Union, causing considerable irritation to the Scottish Government and criticism that Rajoy was interfering in the internal affairs of another state. Relations between the Spanish and Scottish governments deteriorated further when the Scottish Government alleged that Rajoy invited a senior UK official to visit Madrid allegedly to co-ordinate British and Spanish opposition to the independence movements in Scotland and Catalonia.

=== Anti-egalitarianism ===
During his early political life, Rajoy defended anti-egalitarian stances. In 1983, as the youngest member of the Parliament of Galicia, Rajoy wrote in a piece in the Faro de Vigo titled "Human equality and models of society" the notion that "all policies seeking to achieve equality were a fallacy". As he wrote a year later in another piece for the Faro de Vigo titled "La envidia igualitaria" ("The egalitarian envy", 24 July 1984), when he was already president of the Provincial Deputation of Pontevedra: "Biological equality is not possible. But social equality isn't either. ... As it is demonstrated in an undeniable way that nature, as hierarchic, engenders all human unequal, let's avoid exploiting envy and resent laying down the egalitarian dictatorship on such negative impulses."

== Awards ==
- Gold Medal of the Spanish Council of the Professional Cycling (25 April 2001).
- Honorary Doctorate in Law by the Sergio Arboleda University in Bogotá, Colombia (21 April 2012).

== Honours ==
=== National honours ===
- Spain Knight Grand Cross of the Order of Charles III (12 September 2003).
- Spain Knight of the Collar of the Order of Isabella the Catholic (3 August 2018).

=== Foreign honours ===
- Mexico: Sash of Special Category of the Order of the Aztec Eagle by the Mexican President Felipe Calderón Hinojosa (18 April 2012)
- Peru: Grand Cross of the Order of the Sun of Peru (2013)
- Chile: Grand Cross of the Order of Merit of Chile
- Serbia: Order of the Republic of Serbia (2013)
- Portugal: Grand Cross of the Order of Christ (15 April 2018)

=== Negative distinctions ===
- Heart of Stone Award (2015).
- Persona non grata in Pontevedra (2016).

== Genealogy ==
Ancestors of Mariano Rajoy

Mariano Rajoy do Barro
Enrique Rajoy Leloup
Rosa Leloup González
Mariano Rajoy Sobredo
Salvador Sobredo Bustelo
Mercedes Sobredo Brandáriz
Pilar Brandáriz Hernández
Mariano Rajoy Brey
Don Manuel Maria Brey Barcala
Manuel Brey Guerra
Dona Juana Guerra Fernandez
Olga Brey López
Manuel Lopez Vigo
Carmen López Mosquera
Josefa Mosquera Otero

Party political offices
| Preceded by José Luis Barreiro | President of People's Alliance in Pontevedra; 1987–1991 | Succeeded by Xosé Cuiña |
| Preceded by Arturo Moreno | Vicesecretary-General of the People's Party; 1990–2003 | Succeeded by Javier Arenas |
| Preceded by Javier Arenas | Secretary-General of the People's Party; 2003–2004 | Succeeded by Ángel Acebes |
| Preceded by José María Aznar | President of the People's Party; 2004–2018 | Succeeded by Pablo Casado |
Political offices
| Preceded by Xosé Manuel Barreiro | Vice President of Galicia; 1986–1987 | Succeeded by Xosé Manuel Barreiro |
| Preceded by Joan Lerma | Minister of Public Administrations; 1996–1999 | Succeeded by Ángel Acebes |
| Preceded by Esperanza Aguirre | Minister of Education and Culture; 1999–2000 | Succeeded by Pilar del Castillo as Minister of Education, Culture and Sport |
| Preceded by Francisco Álvarez Cascos | First Deputy Prime Minister of Spain; 2000–2003 | Succeeded by Rodrigo Rato |
| Preceded by Francisco Álvarez Cascos | Minister of the Presidency; 2000–2001 | Succeeded by Juan José Lucas |
| Preceded by Jaime Mayor Oreja | Minister of the Interior; 2001–2002 | Succeeded by Ángel Acebes |
| Preceded by Juan José Lucas | Minister of the Presidency; 2002–2003 | Succeeded by Javier Arenas |
| Preceded by José Luis Rodríguez Zapatero | Leader of the Opposition; 2004–2011 | Succeeded by Alfredo Pérez Rubalcaba |
| Preceded by José Luis Rodríguez Zapatero | Prime Minister of Spain; 2011–2018 | Succeeded by Pedro Sánchez |
Academic offices
| Preceded by Íñigo Méndez de Vigo | Convocation Speaker of the College of Europe; 2014 | Succeeded by Alexander Stubb |
