= Mariano Rajoy Sobredo =

Spanish jurist and magistrate (1921–2018)

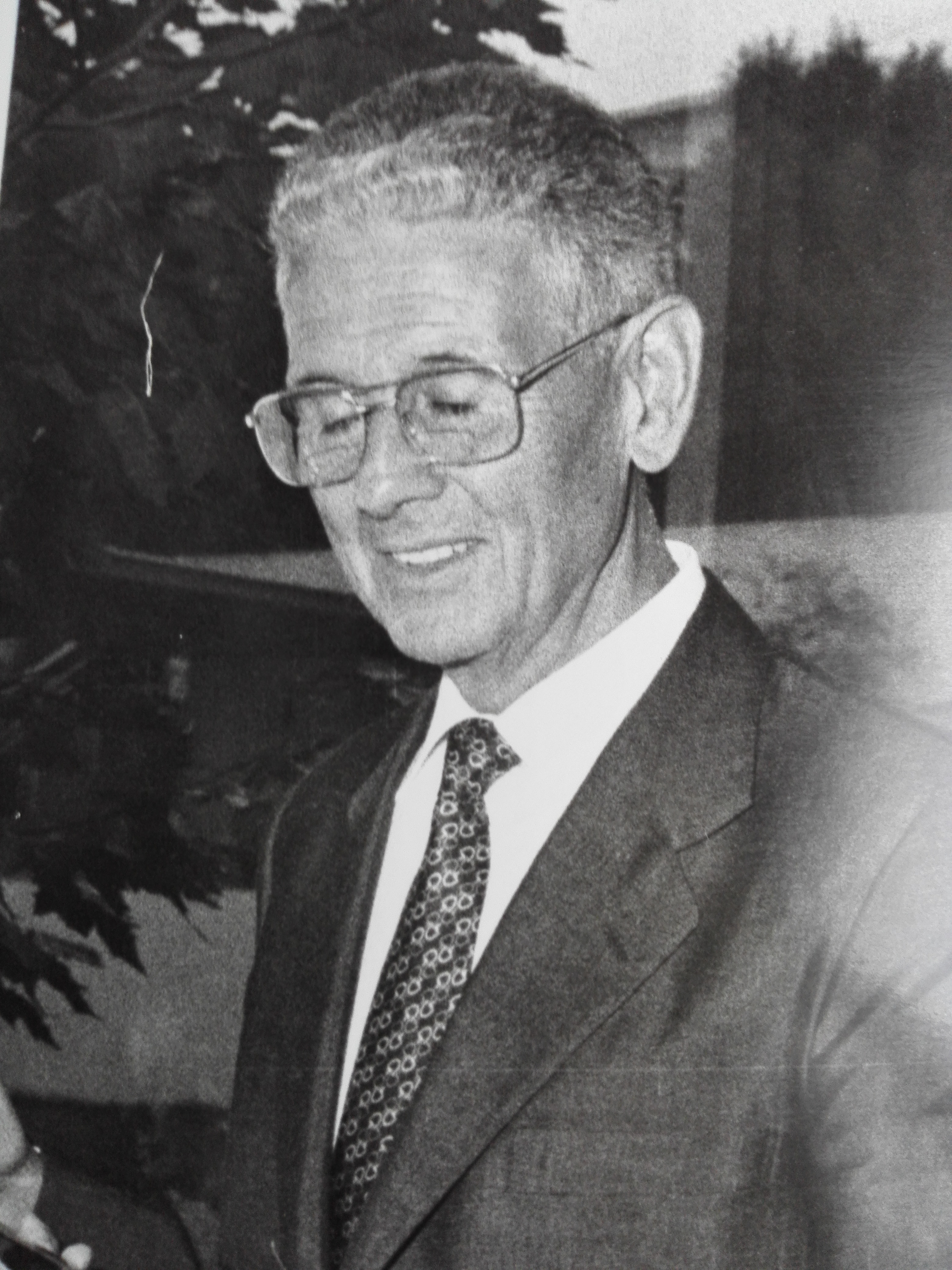

President of the provincial court of Pontevedra
- In office 20 December 1969 – 10 January 1986
- Preceded by: José Luis Bescansa y Gutiérrez de Ceballos
- Succeeded by: Félix Rodríguez García

Personal details
- Born: 28 August 1921 Santiago de Compostela, Spain
- Died: 1 November 2018 (aged 97) Madrid, Spain
- Spouse: Olga Brey López (m. 1954–1993)
- Children: 4: Mariano Rajoy Brey; María de las Mercedes Rajoy Brey; Luis Rajoy Brey; Enrique Rajoy Brey
- Parents: Enrique Rajoy Leloup (father); María de las Mercedes Sobredo Brandáriz (mother)
- Education: Universidad de Santiago de Compostela
- Occupation: Jurist and magistrate

Mariano Rajoy Sobredo (28 August 1921 – 1 November 2018), was a Spanish jurist and magistrate, president of the provincial court of Pontevedra, and father of former Prime Minister Mariano Rajoy.

Born in Santiago de Compostela, he was the son of Enrique Rajoy, a Galician academic who participated in the commission that wrote the Galician Statute of Autonomy of 1936. Due to his state of health, he remained living in the presidential Palace of Moncloa during the mandate of his son, an issue that outraged part of the population because his care was borne by the palace budget.

After passing the state examination to the judiciary, he was appointed judge of First Instance and Instruction in Orders, La Coruña, in 1948, to be subsequently assigned to the Courts of First Instance and Instruction of Lalín, Pontevedra (1949-1953), Piedrahita, Avila (1953) -1955) and Carballiño, Orense (1955-1958). He was promoted to magistrate in 1958, was a judge of First Instance and Instruction in Oviedo until 1960, and later to León as Judge of First Instance and Instruction, staying in the capital of León for ten years. There he coincided, among others, with the lawyer Juan Rodríguez García-Lozano, father of former President of the Government José Luis Rodríguez Zapatero. Mariano Rajoy Sobredo reached in León an outstanding reputation for the impeccable manner in which he instructed many of the cases that came to his hands. was distinguished with the Order of St. Raymond of Peñafort.
