= Elvira Fernández (businesswoman) =

Spanish businesswoman (born 1965)

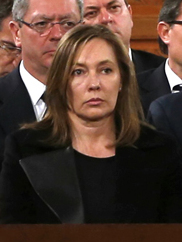
- Fernández in 2014

Personal details
- Born: Elvira Fernández Balboa; 27 April 1965 (age 61) Pontevedra, Galicia, Spain
- Spouse: Mariano Rajoy (m. 1996)
- Children: 2

Elvira Fernández Balboa (born 27 April 1965), also known as Viri, is a Spanish businesswoman. She is the wife of Mariano Rajoy, prime minister of Spain from 2011 to 2018.

== Biography ==
Fernández was born in Pontevedra, Galicia to Manuel Fernández (died 2002) and Elvira Balboa. Though her family were wealthy, she was educated in state schools before attending the School of Economics at the University of Santiago de Compostela from 1983 to 1988. After graduating, she worked in administration in a construction company.

Fernández, then owner of a sanitation company, met Mariano Rajoy in Pontevedra in 1992, through his brother Luis. Active in the People's Party, Luis Rajoy knew Fernández's uncle Elisardo Balboa Dovalo, mayor of the resort of Sanxenxo from 1989 to 1991.

After two years of dating, Fernández moved to Madrid where Rajoy was working. Through his friend José Manuel Lorenzo, director general of Antena 3, she obtained an internship in the channel's financial department. Her relationship was only known to a few close friends until her marriage. She later worked as a content analyst for Telefónica.

On 28 December 1996, she wed Rajoy, who at 41 was ten years her senior. The couple married on La Toja Island off the coast of the Province of Pontevedra. The ceremony was attended by Rajoy's new colleagues in the Government of Spain, apart from prime minister José María Aznar who was on duty in Guatemala, as well as the Xunta de Galicia.

Rajoy and Fernández have two sons, Mariano and Juan, born 1999 and 2005. Both were born in Barcelona. The family lived in Aravaca in the northwest of Madrid before moving into the Palace of Moncloa when Rajoy became prime minister.

Fernández was barely known to the public before Rajoy ran in the 2008 Spanish general election. The Spanish media likened her low profile to Sonsoles Espinosa, wife of predecessor José Luis Rodríguez Zapatero, and contrasted it with Ana Botella, Aznar's wife and an active politician.
