= Mendoza Mansion =

Eclectic mansion in Pontevedra, Spain

- Palacete de las Mendoza
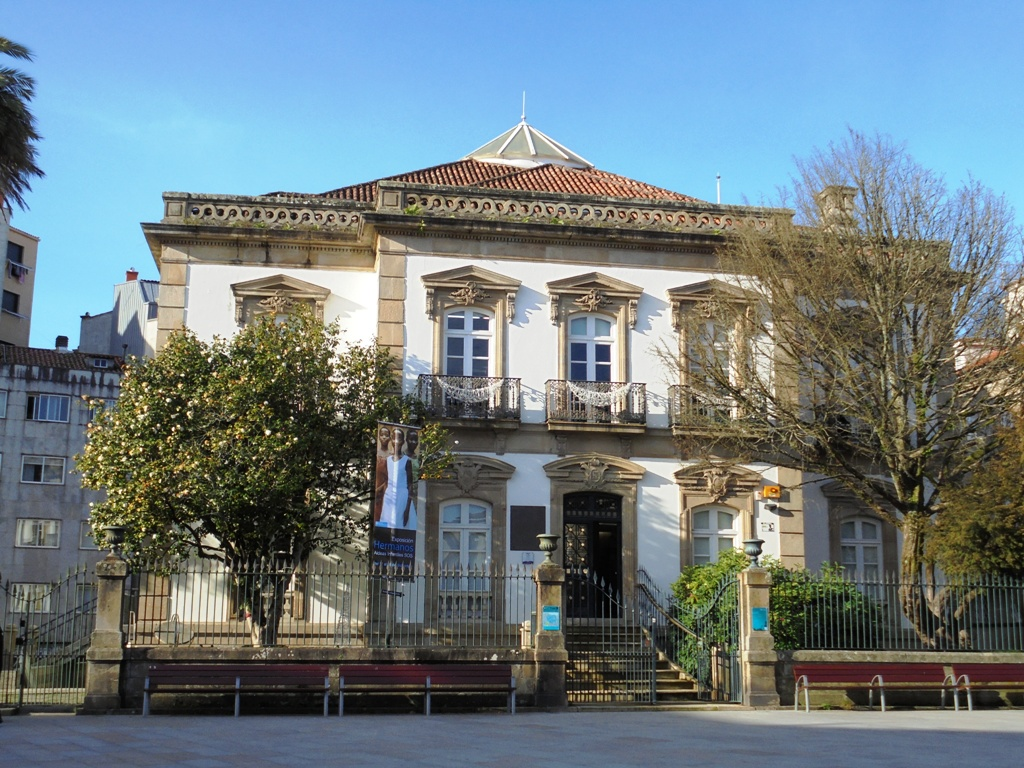
- Interactive map of the Mendoza Mansion area

General information
- Type: Mansion
- Location: Pontevedra, Spain
- Coordinates: 42°25′58.44″N 8°38′51.36″W
- Construction started: 1878
- Completed: 1880
- Owner: Provincial Deputation of Pontevedra
- Operator: Rias Baixas Tourism

Technical details
- Floor count: 2

Design and construction
- Architect: Alejandro Sesmero

Website
- Official website

The Mendoza mansion is a building located between Santa María Avenue and Arzobispo Malvar Street, at the western end of the old town of Pontevedra (Galicia, Spain). It is currently the headquarters of the Rías Baixas Tourist Office.

== History ==
The medieval castle of the Churruchaos (or Archbishops of Santiago de Compostela) and the Archbishop's Towers, whose interpretation centre (CITA) is located nearby, once stood on the site of the manor. In 1877, Soledad Méndez Núñez, sister of the famous sailor Casto Méndez Núñez, bought the land and commissioned the architect Alejandro Rodríguez Sesmero to build the mansion. He is also the author of the imposing 19th century buildings of the Provincial Council of Pontevedra and the City Hall of Pontevedra. This architect was responsible for planning the noble buildings of Pontevedra, once the medieval city wall had been demolished. The mansion was built between 1878 and 1880.

This mansion was the first building in the city to have a running water supply. The architect Sesmero was responsible for planning the running water supply for Pontevedra and its squares. Several 19th-century fountains were installed here, one of which is very close to the mansion. Its first inhabitants were its owner, Soledad Méndez Núñez, her sister, Maria del Carmen Clara Méndez Núñez, her husband, José Babiano Rodríguez, and the couple's daughter, who was to become the remarkable painter Carmen Babiano Méndez-Núñez. The house was eventually passed on to Maria and Concepcion Mendoza Babiano, daughters of Carmen Babiano Mendez-Nunez, who were involved in the city's culture and were the last to occupy the small palace in 1971. During their stay, the palace became a meeting place for the important personalities of the time.

The building suffered a certain amount of neglect until the 1980s, when in 1981 it became one of the main filming locations for the television series Los gozos y las sombras by Televisión Española. The Mendoza's mansion is easily recognizable in the series as Doña Mariana's house (Amparo Rivelles), although only its exteriors were used, since the interior scenes were shot in another small palace in Madrid, near Alcalá Street.

It was then bought in the 1990s by a banking entity, Caja Madrid, until the Provincial Deputation of Pontevedra bought it to make it the headquarters of Tourism Rias Baixas, inaugurated for this function on 28 July 2004.

In 2015, an artist from Lugo transformed the trunk and branches of the old dead yew tree in the gardens of the Palacete de las Mendoza into a living sculpture by placing a few berries weighing 40 kilos and 1.10 metres high as artistic elements on the woody skeleton of the yew tree, with which the artist wanted the old tree to bear fruit like never before.

== Description ==
The building belongs to the eclectic style that prevailed at the end of the 19th century, with elements and concepts inspired by French architecture. It consists of a semi-basement, a ground floor and a first floor. On the ground floor there is a main door and four windows in the walls and on the upper floor there are five balcony doors. The upper part of the windows and doors is decorated with ornamental motifs. The top of the mansion is topped with a circular cornice.

On the façade, the windows are surrounded by neoclassical borders, with Lintels ending in triangular Pediments on the second floor and a circular arch on the first. The Caja Madrid savings bank, which owned the building for some years, renovated the interior and the rooms on the ground floor, the music room, the dining room, the tea room and the imperial wooden staircase, making everything disappear to create the central courtyard. The building is secluded and surrounded by gardens that enhance its architecture.

== Culture ==
The daily parties of the sisters María and Concha Mendoza Babiano were attended by the most distinguished members of Pontevedra society of the time and the illustrious visitors who came to the city or arrived at the port of Marín-Pontevedra. For several decades, the Mendoza sisters compiled the recipes they asked their guests for, collected on their travels or received from their friends. They ended up creating an unprecedented and valuable private recipe collection for their parties, with dishes from around the world. These recipes were published at the end of 2021 in a book entitled Las 1001 recetas del palacete de las Mendoza

== Gallery ==
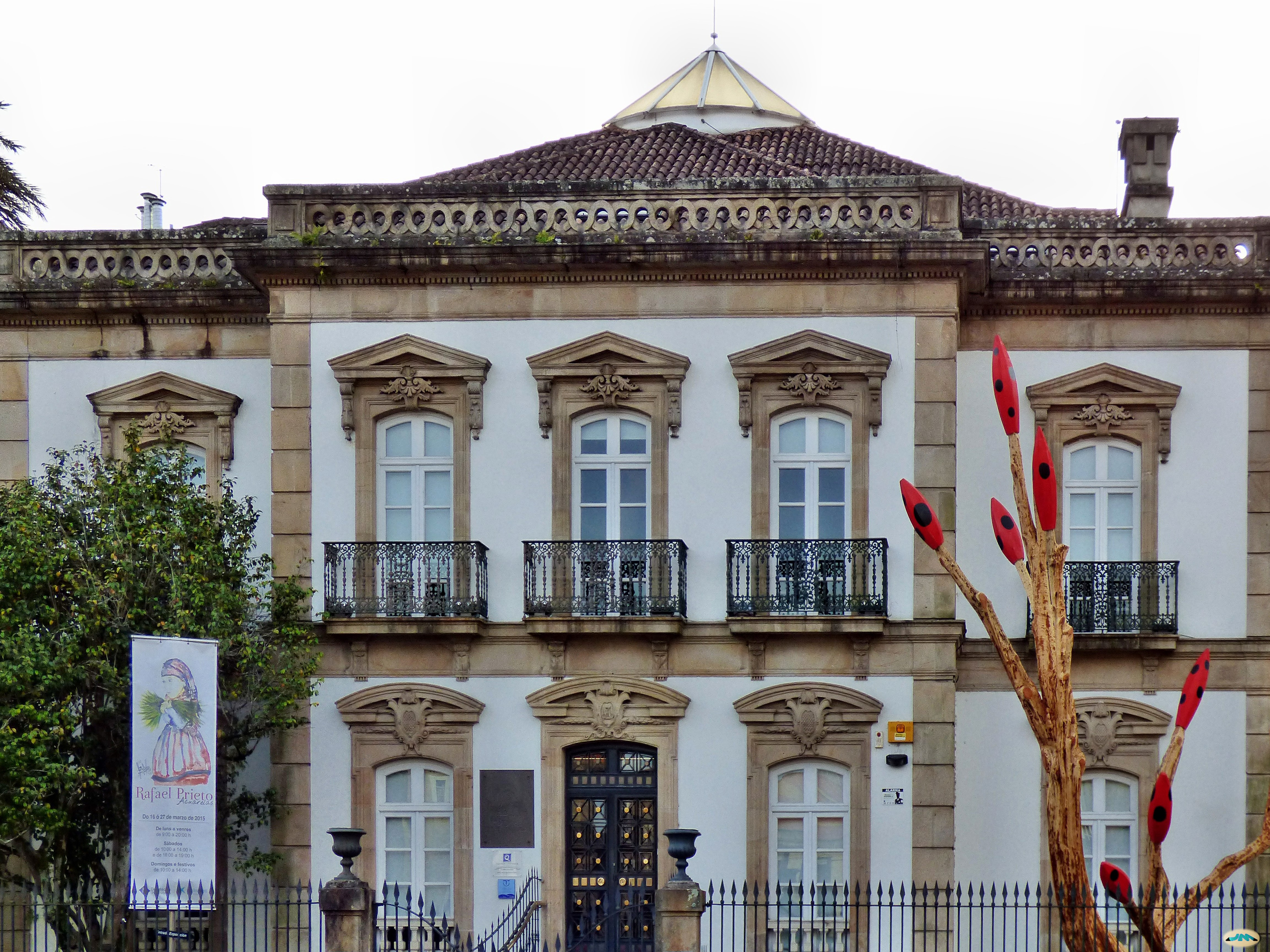
Façade

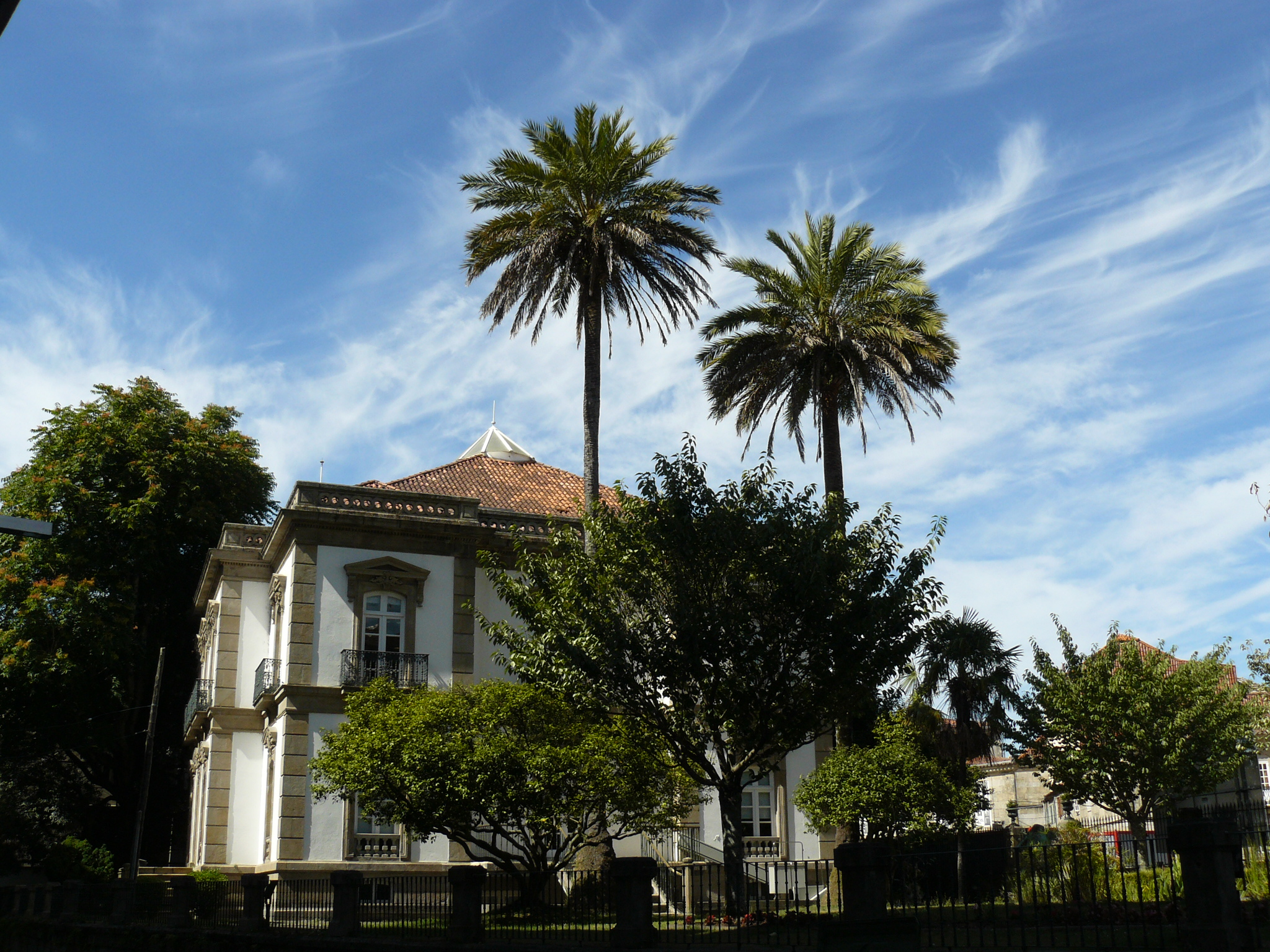
The mansion surrounded by gardens.

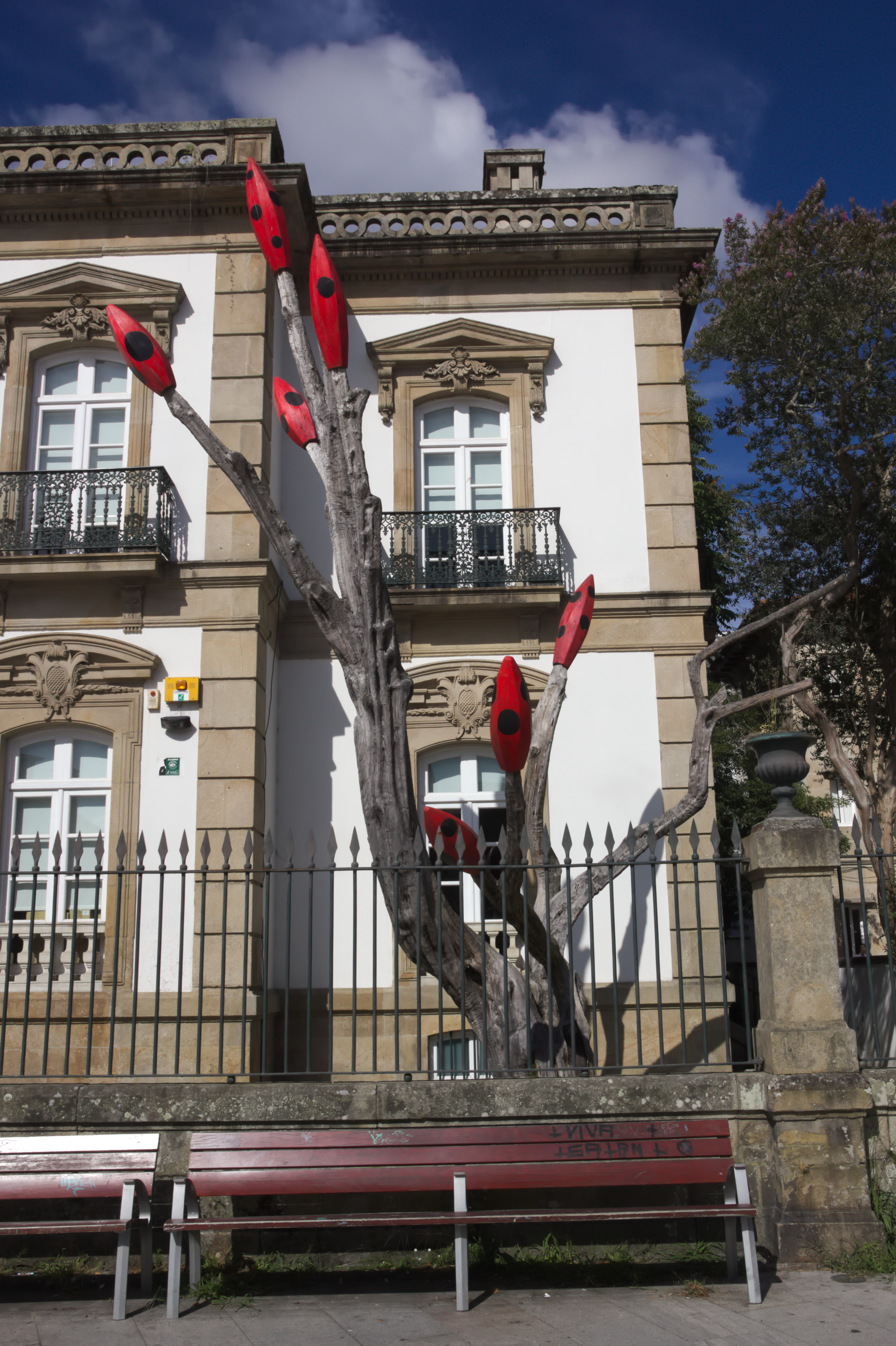
Decorated dead yew

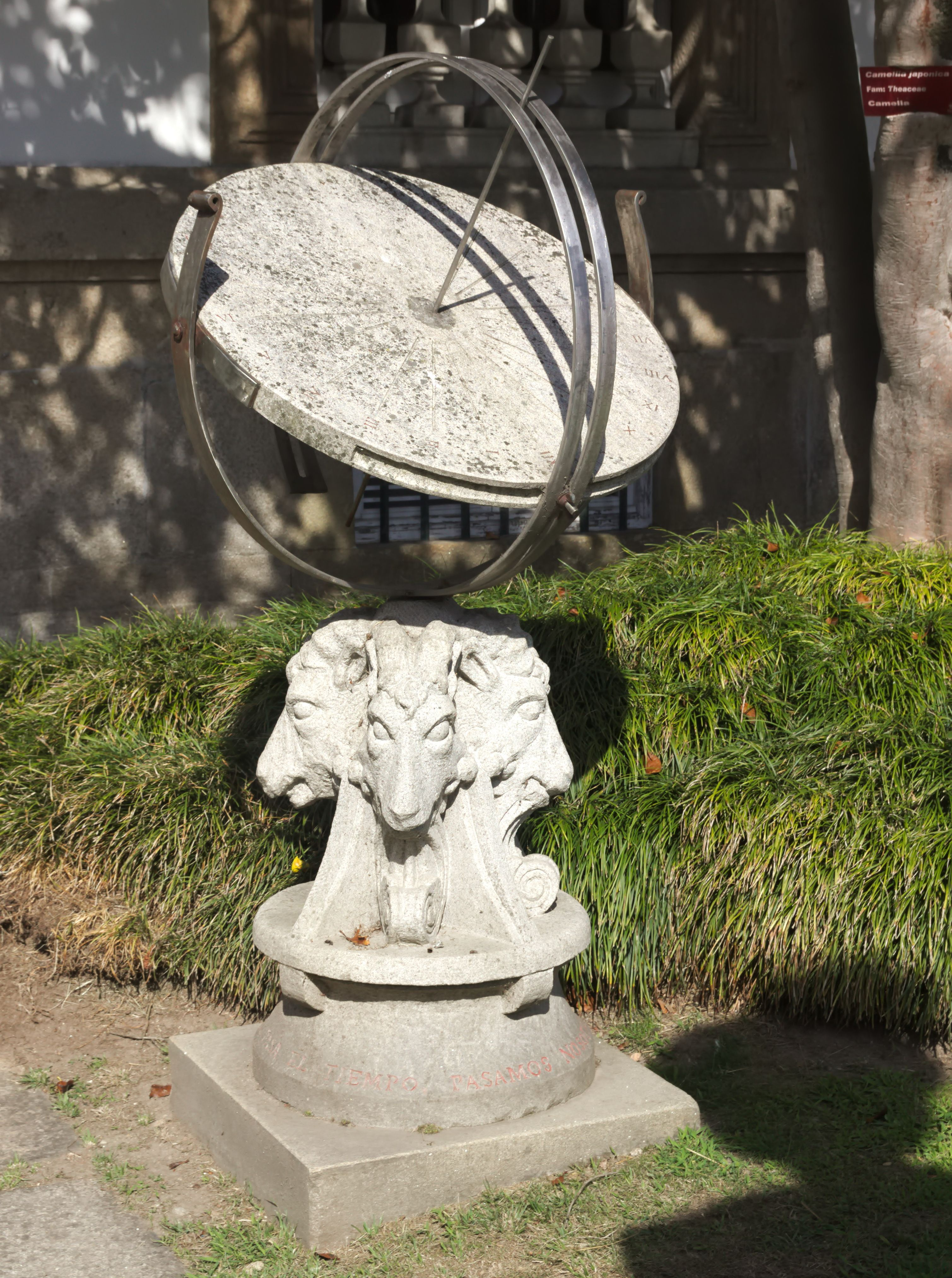
Sundial in the garden

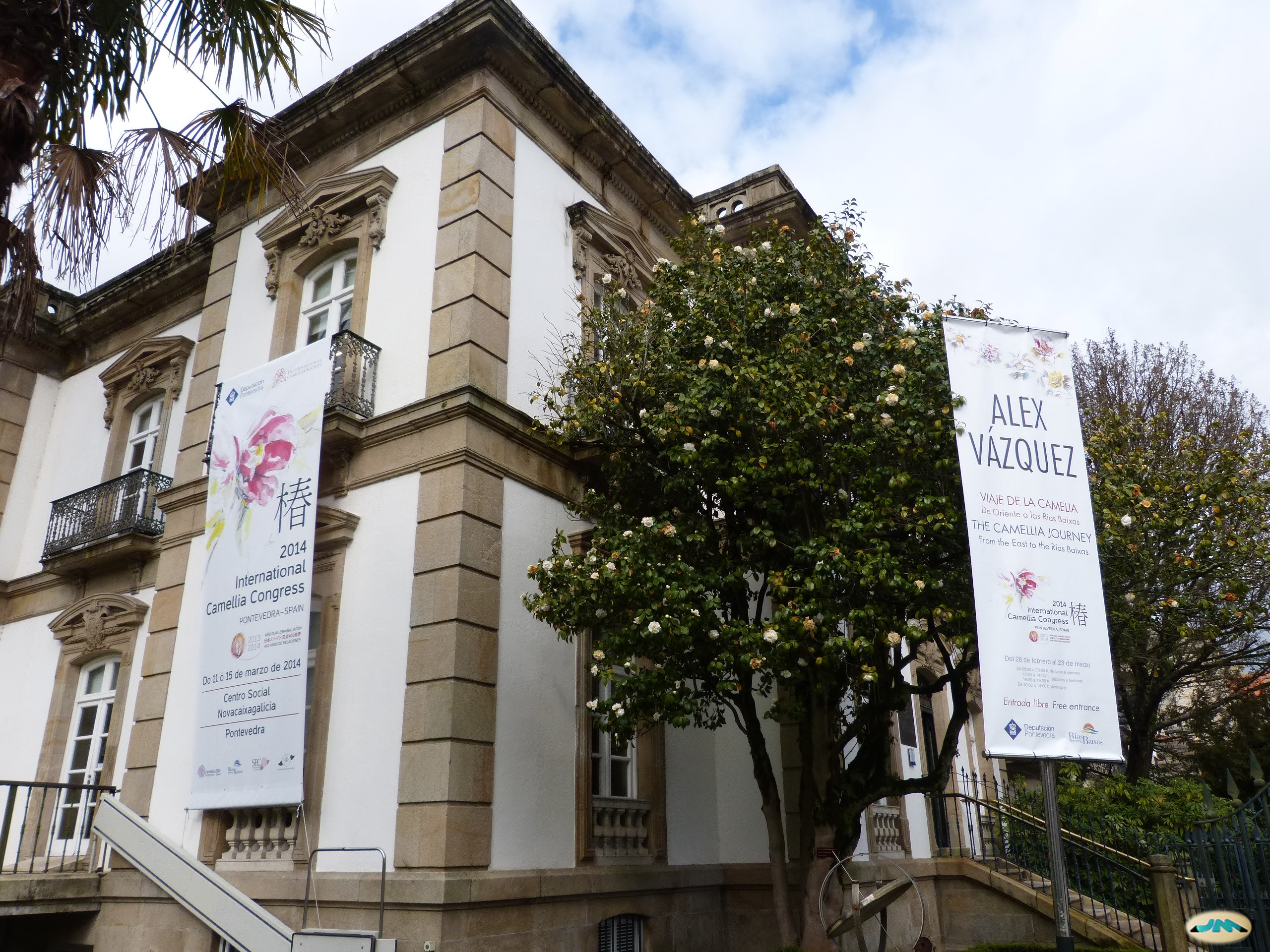
Camellia Congress 2014

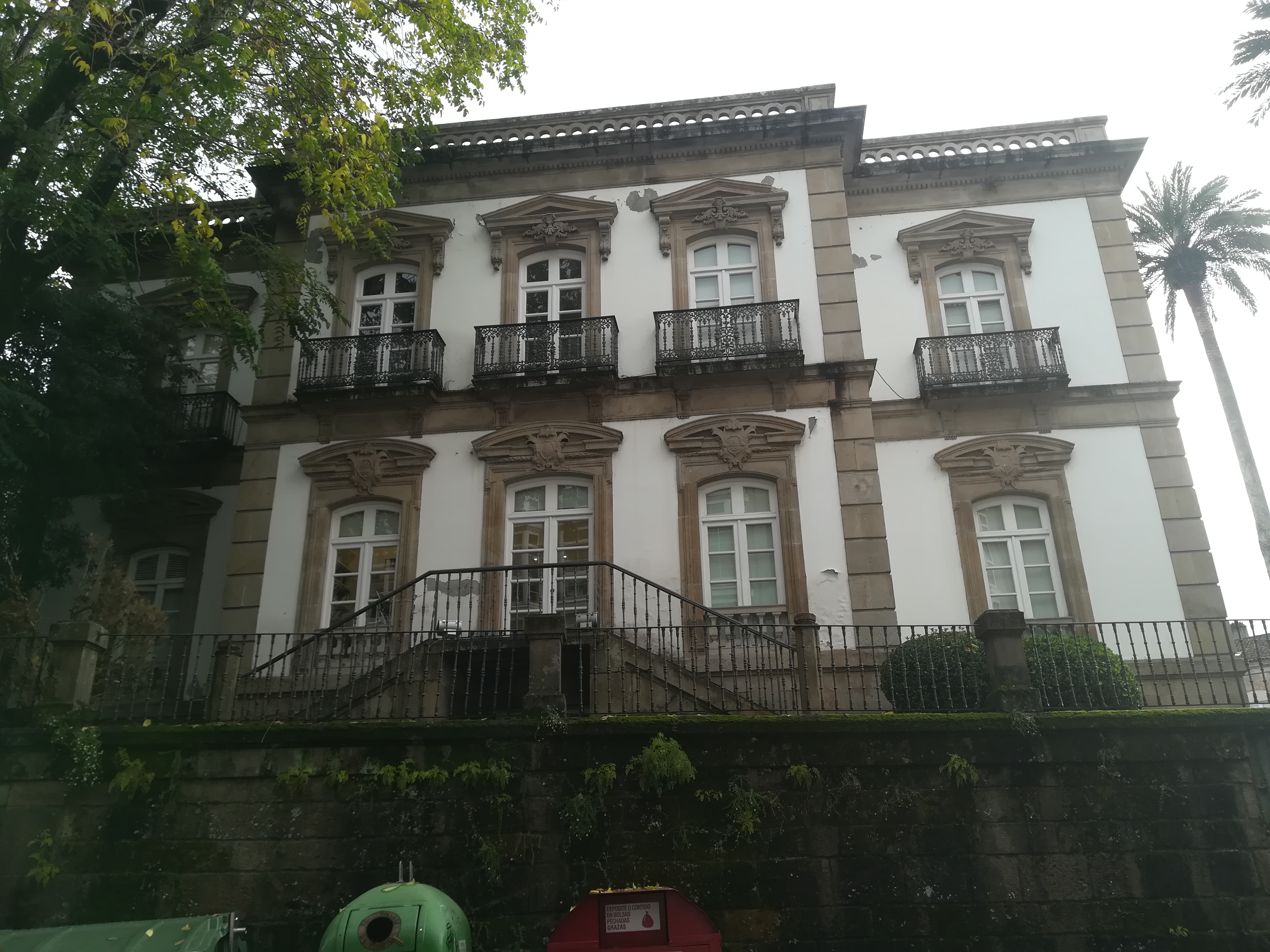

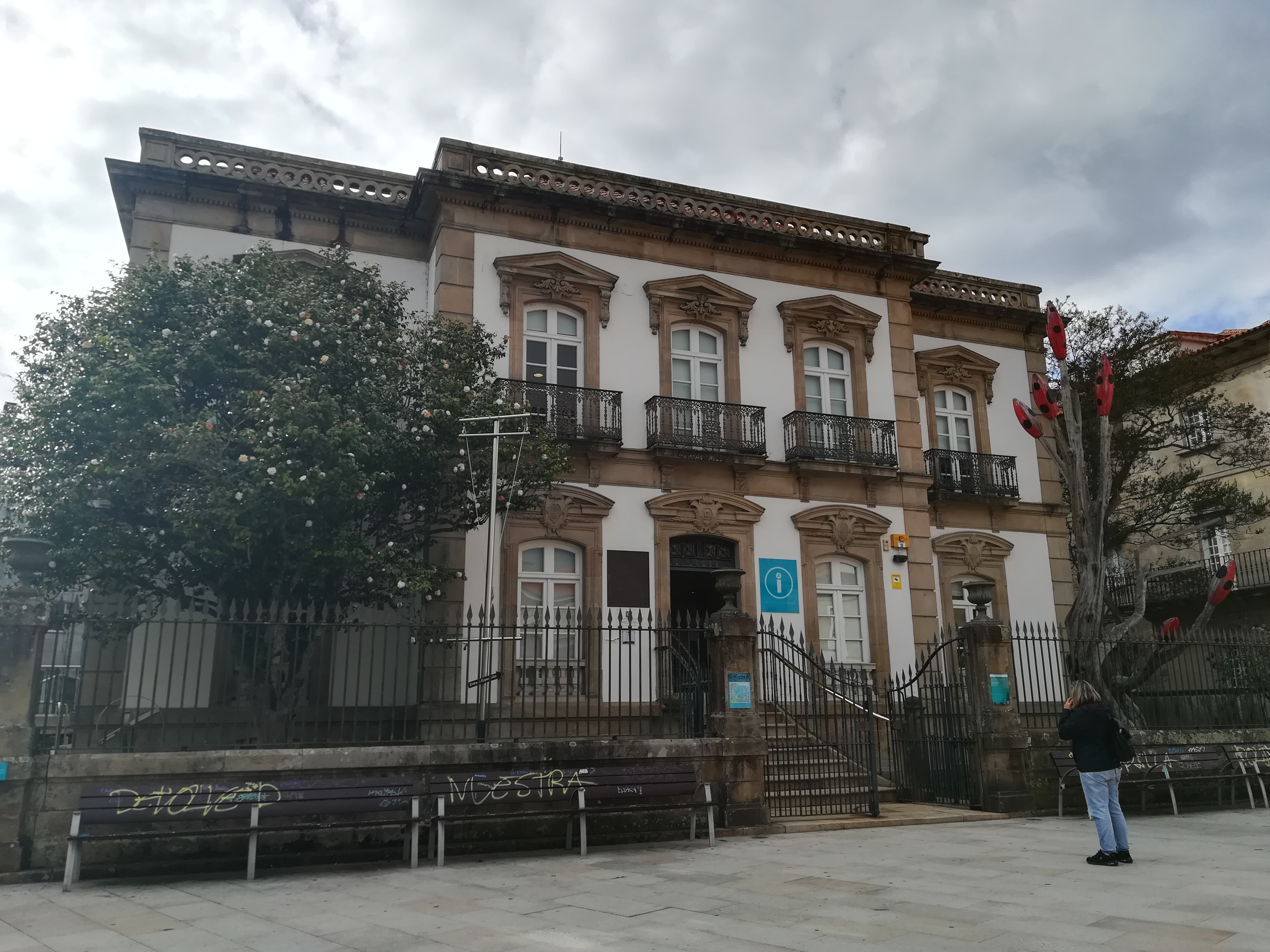

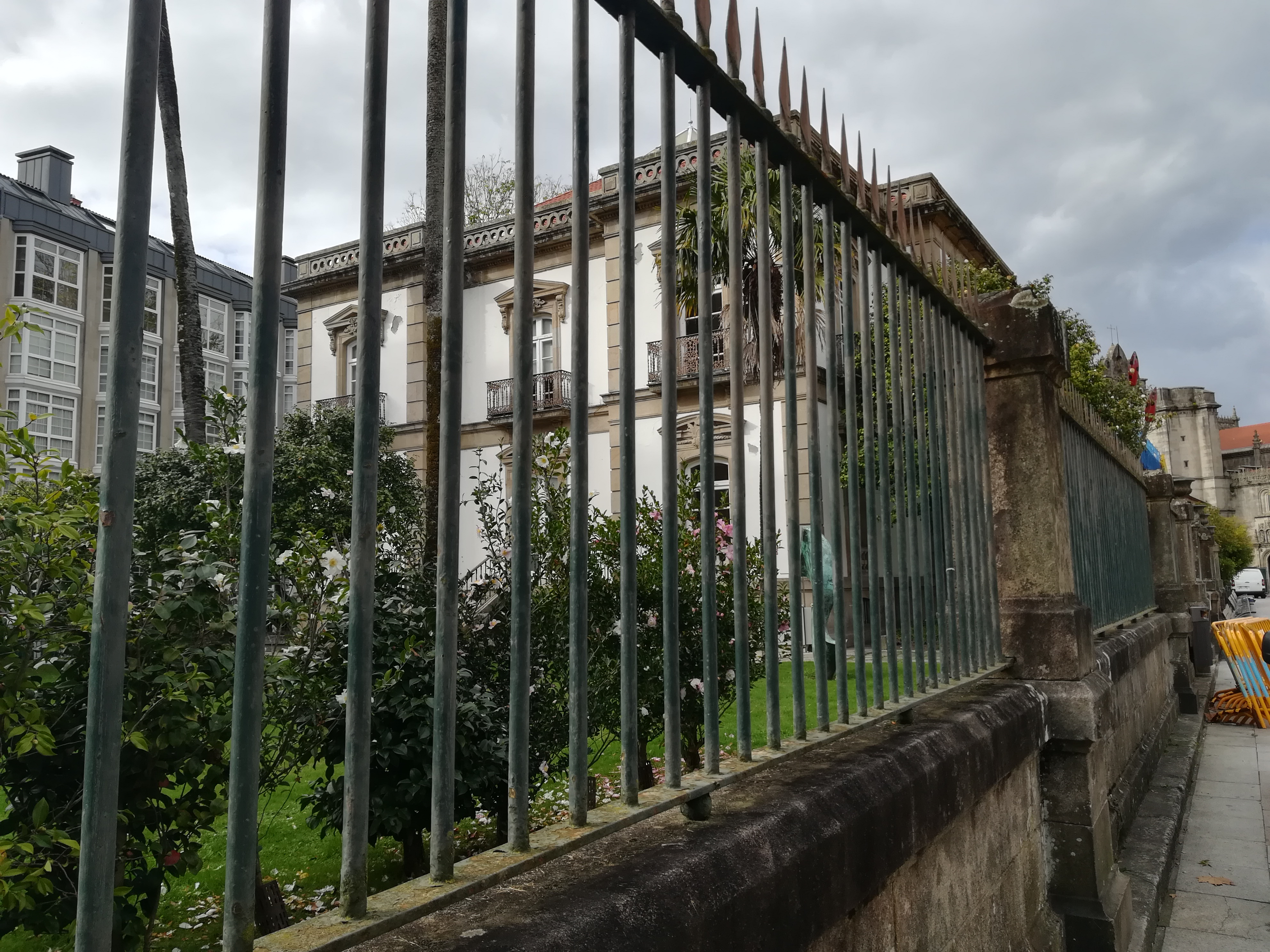

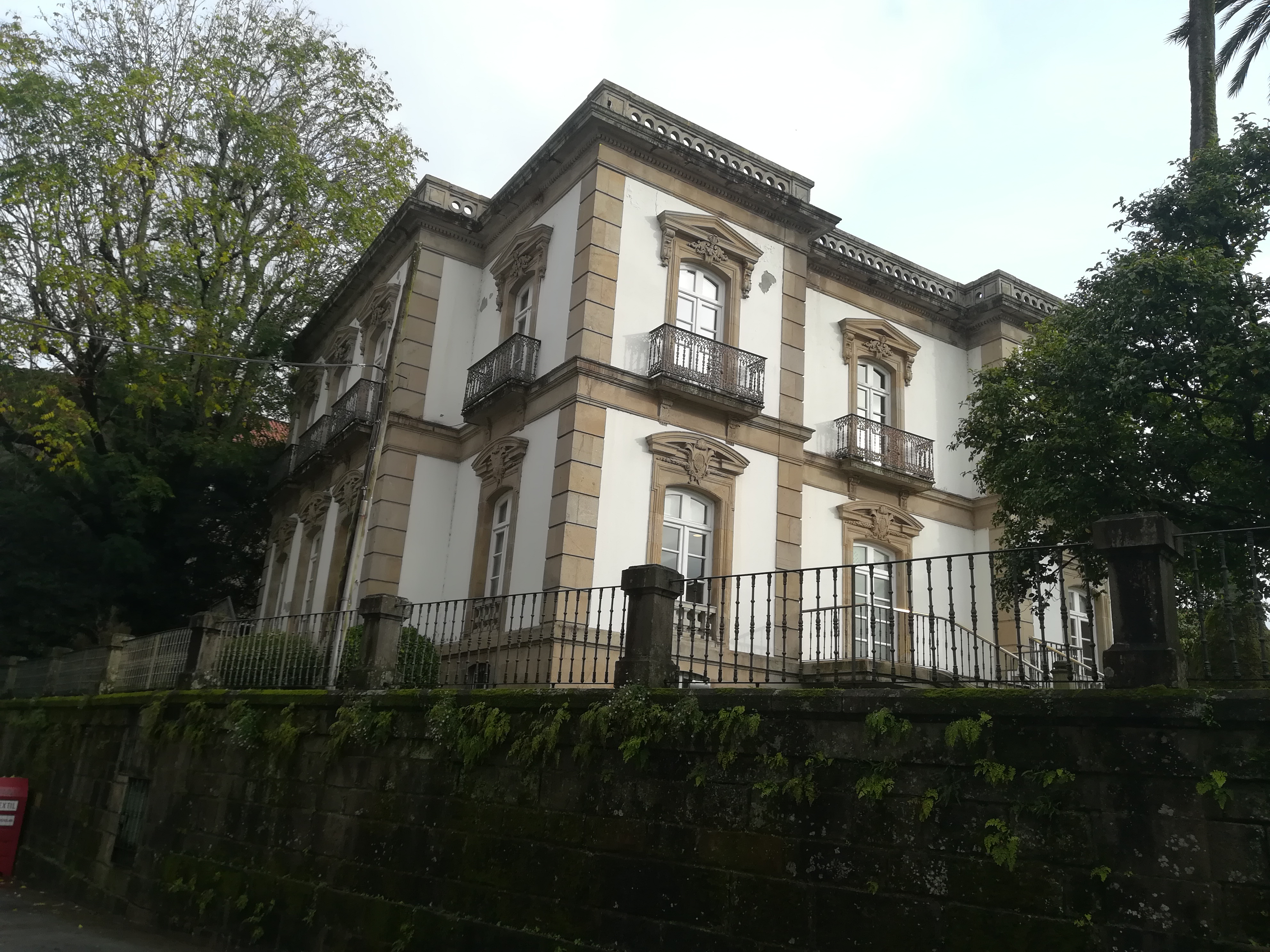

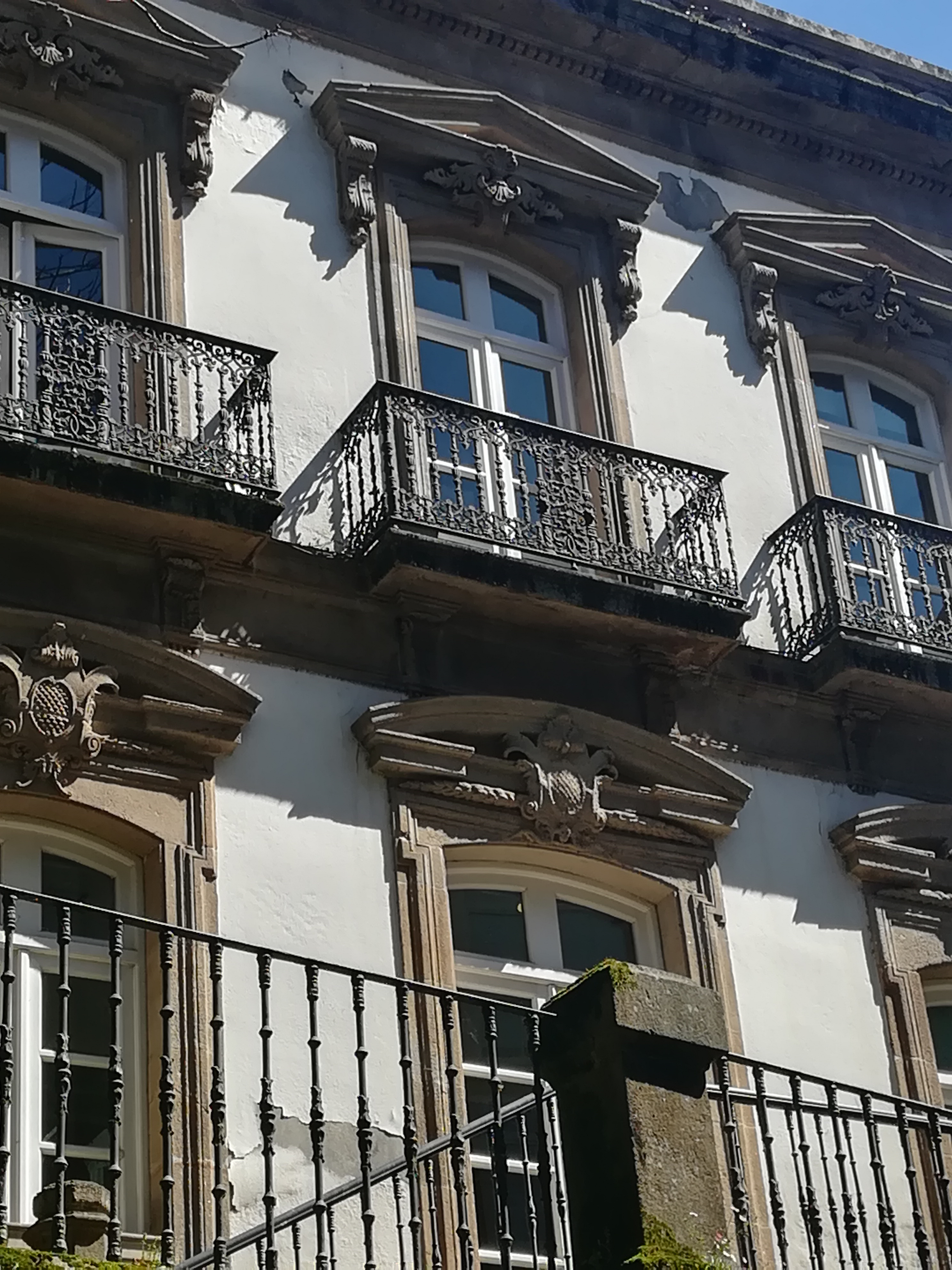

== Bibliography ==
- Fontoira Surís, Rafael (2009). Pontevedra Monumental. Deputación de Pontevedra. ISBN 978-84-8457-327-2.

== See also ==
- Éclectisme (architecture)
- Hôtel de ville de Pontevedra
- Palacio de la Diputación de Pontevedra
- Pontevedra Congress Hall
