= Palacio de la Diputación de Pontevedra =

Palace of the provincial council of Pontevedra

Palace of the Deputation of Pontevedra
- Palacio de la Diputación de Pontevedra; Pazo da Deputación de Pontevedra
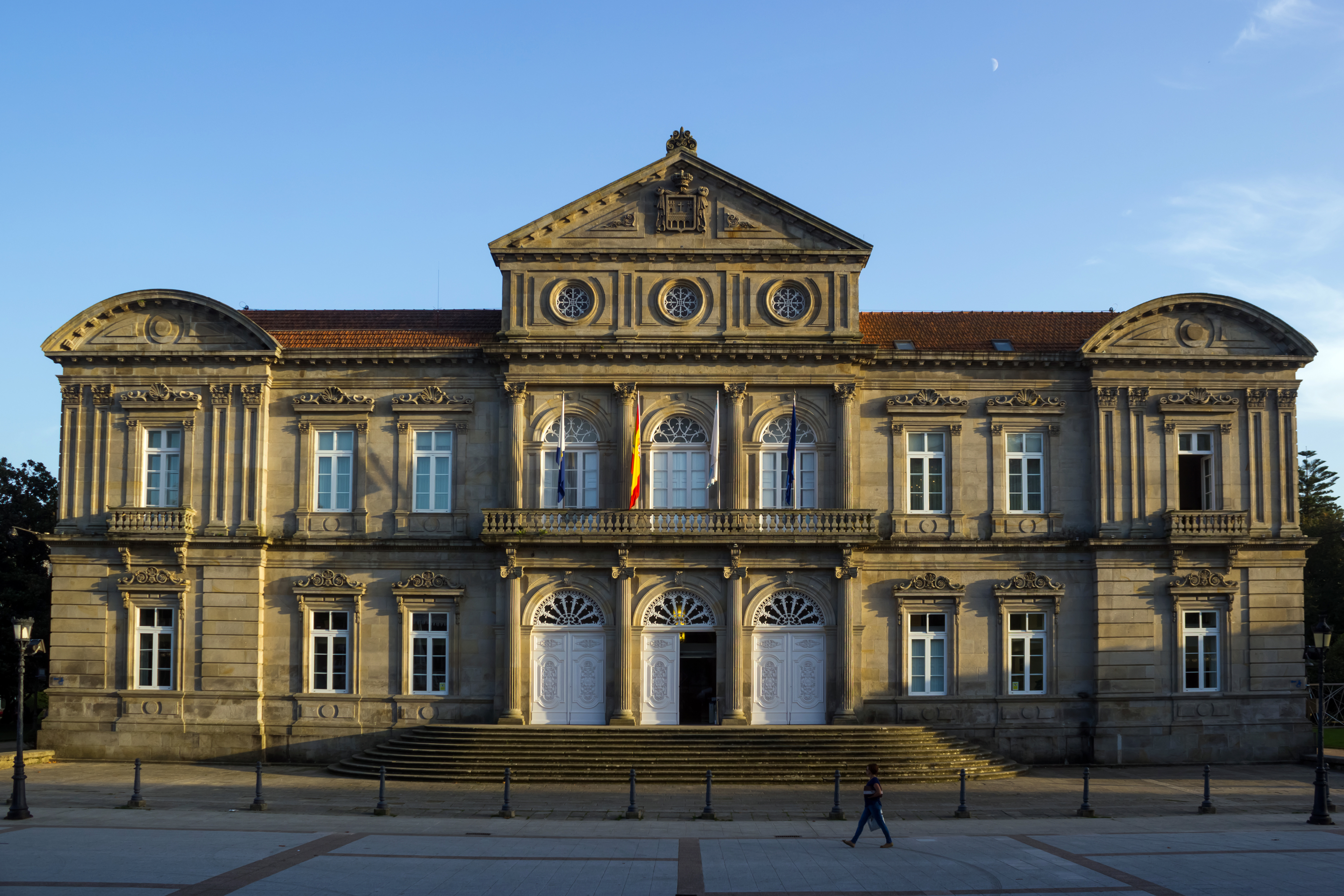
- Pontevedra Provincial Council Palace façade
- Interactive map of the Palace of the Deputation of Pontevedra area

General information
- Type: Government building
- Location: Pontevedra, Galicia, Spain
- Coordinates: 42°25′48.4″N 8°38′53.3″W
- Construction started: 1 March 1884
- Completed: 8 November 1890
- Opening: 1890
- Owner: Provincial Deputation of Pontevedra

Technical details
- Floor count: 2

Design and construction
- Architects: Alejandro Sesmero; Domingo Sesmero

Website
- depo.gal/es/pazo-provincial

The Palace of the Deputation of Pontevedra (Spanish: Palacio de la Diputación de Pontevedra, Galician: Pazo da Deputación de Pontevedra), in Pontevedra, Spain, is the seat of the Provincial Deputation of Pontevedra, the provincial government of the province of Pontevedra. It is located between the Alameda de Pontevedra and the Palm Trees Park.

== History ==
The Provincial Council of Pontevedra was constituted in 1836, the last of the four Galician provinces. For decades, it had its seat in the disused convent of San Francisco, before moving to the current Palace in the Gran Vía de Montero Ríos in 1890. In the 1870s, the project for a new headquarters was undertaken, due to the high cost of maintaining the convent's headquarters.

In 1882, Domingo Rodríguez Sesmero and his son Alejandro Sesmero presented a proposal for the new palace in the classical style. However, the final project would be different: it would show the influence of Alejandro Rodríguez-Sesmero's eclectic style and decorative sense by adopting certain elements from the Pontevedra City Hall. In 1883, the project was approved and the work was awarded, under the direction of Daniel Rodríguez Vaamonde, who was later replaced by Antonio Crespo and Siro Borrajo. In 1884 the Provincial Council of Pontevedra bought the land where the present Palace is located from the City Hall of Pontevedra. Work began on 1 March 1884 and continued until 8 November 1890.

The building was specially adapted to the needs of distinction, symbolism and grandiloquence of the late 19th century.

== Description ==
Alejandro Sesmero designed a large palace for administrative use and chose to combine elements from other periods, including classical, Renaissance and Baroque architecture.

The palace belongs to the eclectic style with elements and concepts inspired by French architecture. It is made of stone, has a square plan and two floors. The facade is symmetrically organised, with a central body and two other lateral bodies slightly advanced with Ashlars with Bossages. A large staircase leads to the main entrance, which is inspired by a triumphal arch, with semicircular arches framed by fluted columns with Ionic capitals.

The upper floor has a large balcony with a balustrade and three further semicircular arches framed by Corinthian columns, also fluted. These columns frame the windows of the noble room. Above them there are three oeils-de-boeuf and a triangular pediment on which the coat of arms of the province of Pontevedra is displayed. The windows in the corners of the building are topped by semicircular Pediments. They are decorated with Lintels with Scallops.

The exterior decoration, of delicate masonry, is inserted in the mouldings around the Lintelled windows, and in the decorations above the Lintels, with Volutes, Palmettes and Rocailles.

Inside, the monumental staircase and the lighting through large Skylights on the roof are remarkable. On the ground floor, there is a central hall on large pillars topped by a large skylight and a Stained glass window with the coat of arms of the province of Pontevedra. The plenary room is decorated with antique plasterwork. Innovative materials for the time are used in the interior of the building, such as iron in the Dormers and the mansard.

== Gallery ==
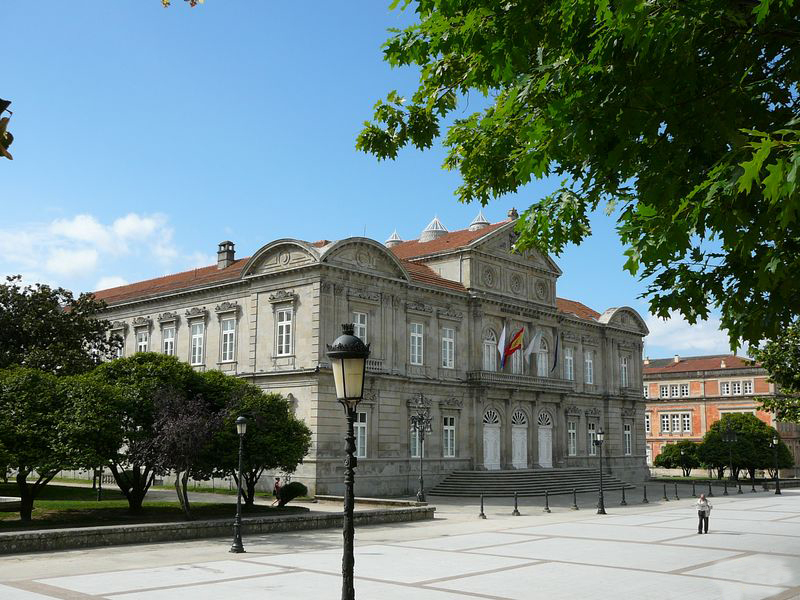

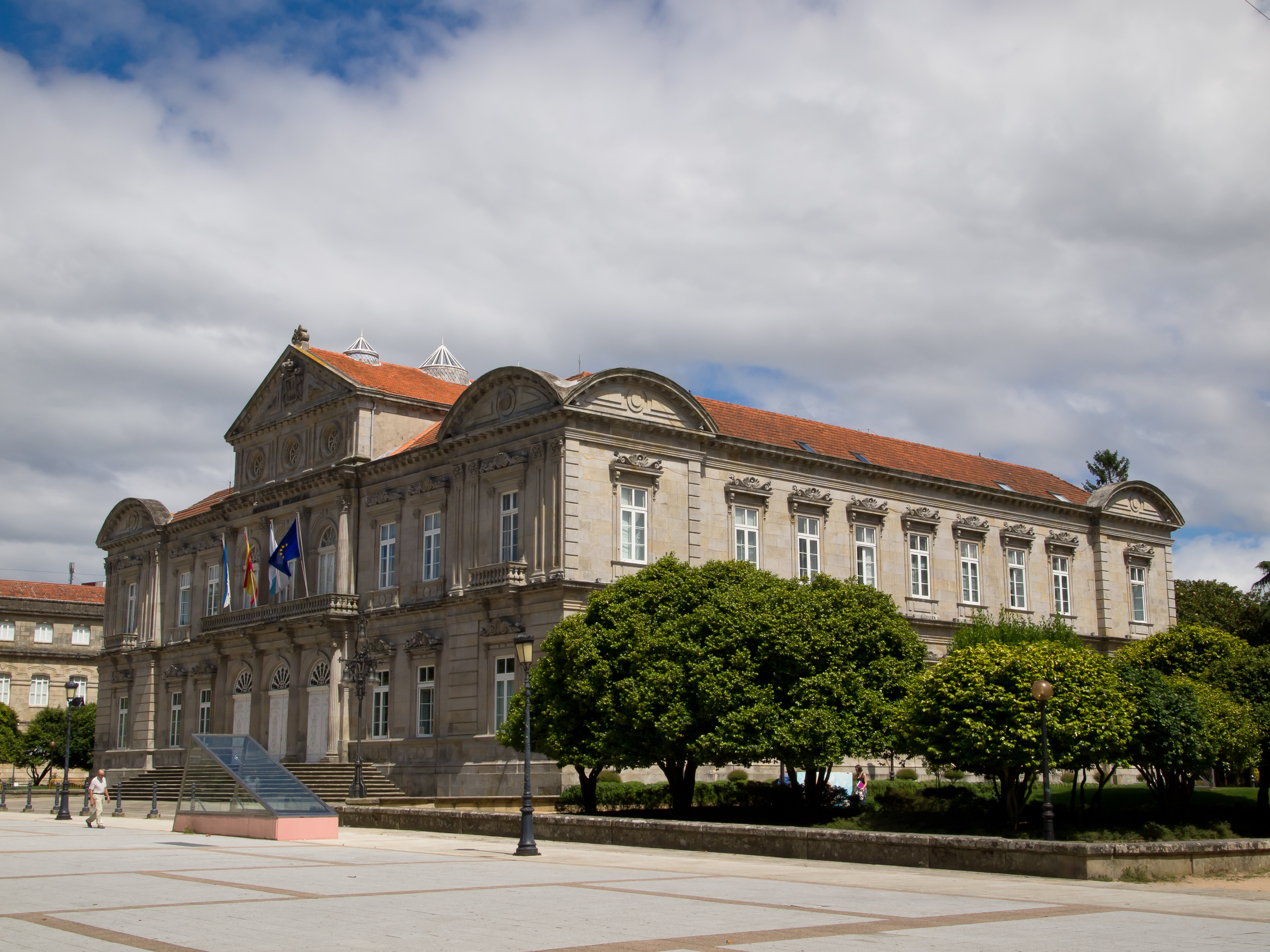

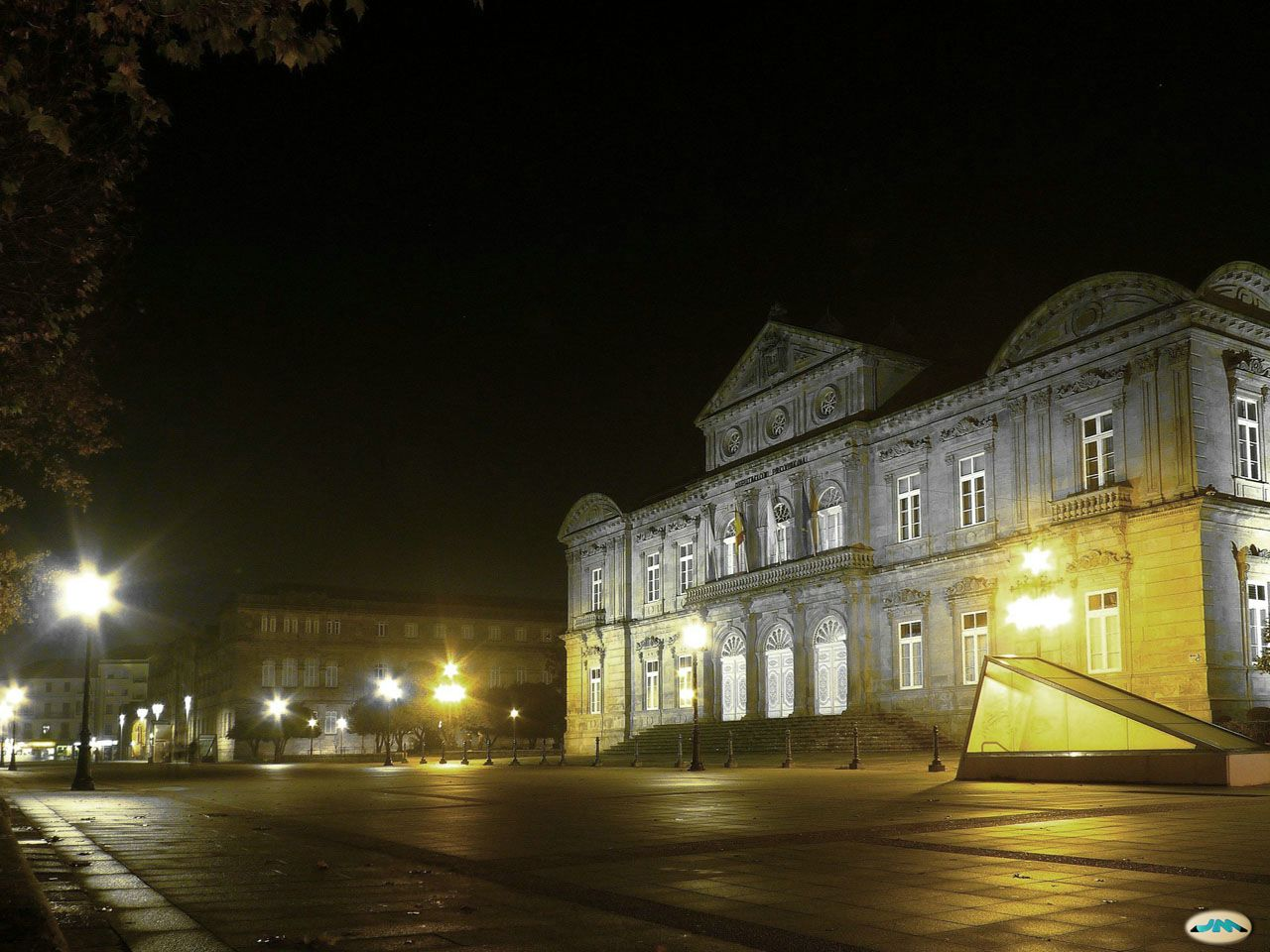

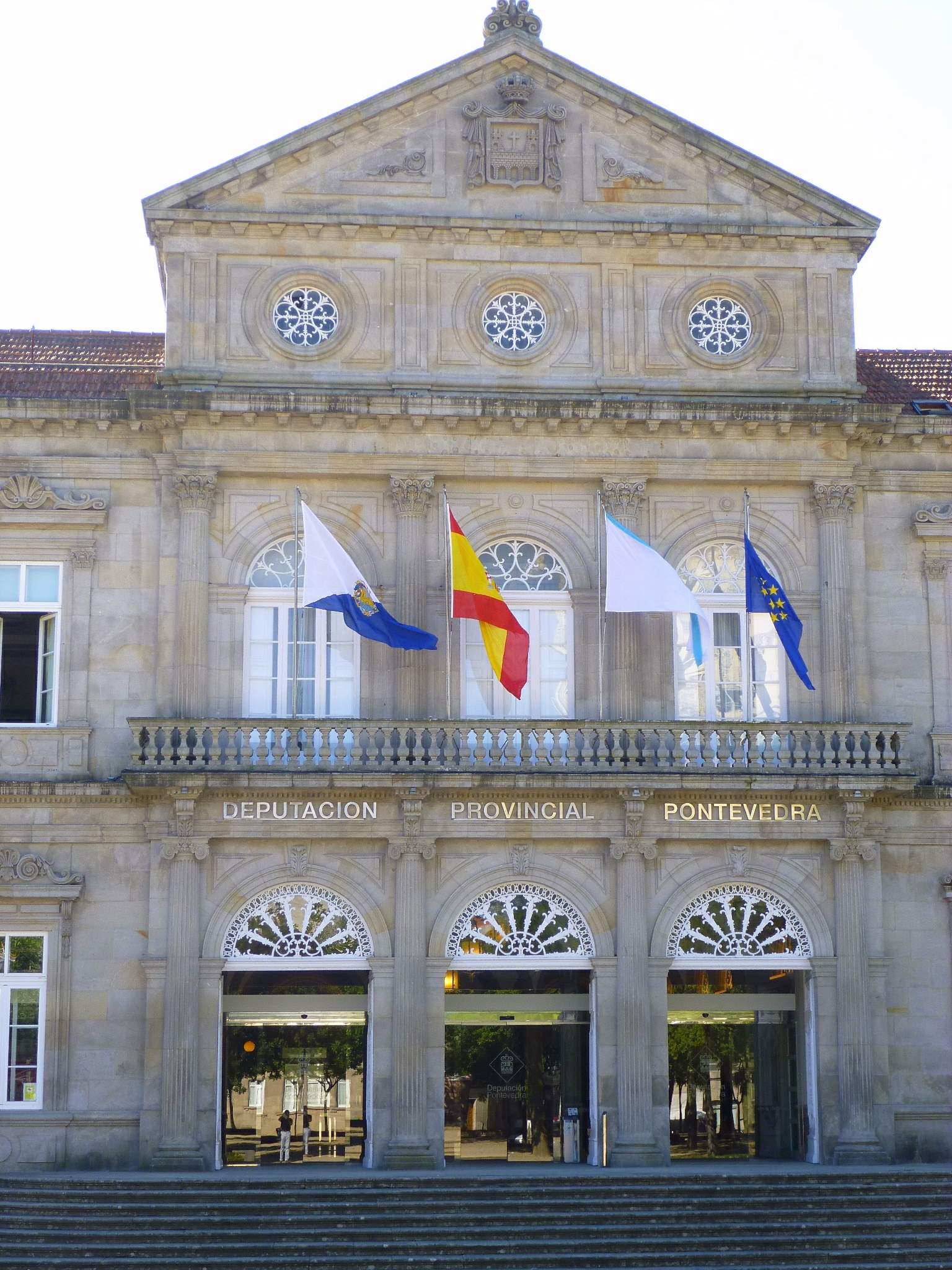

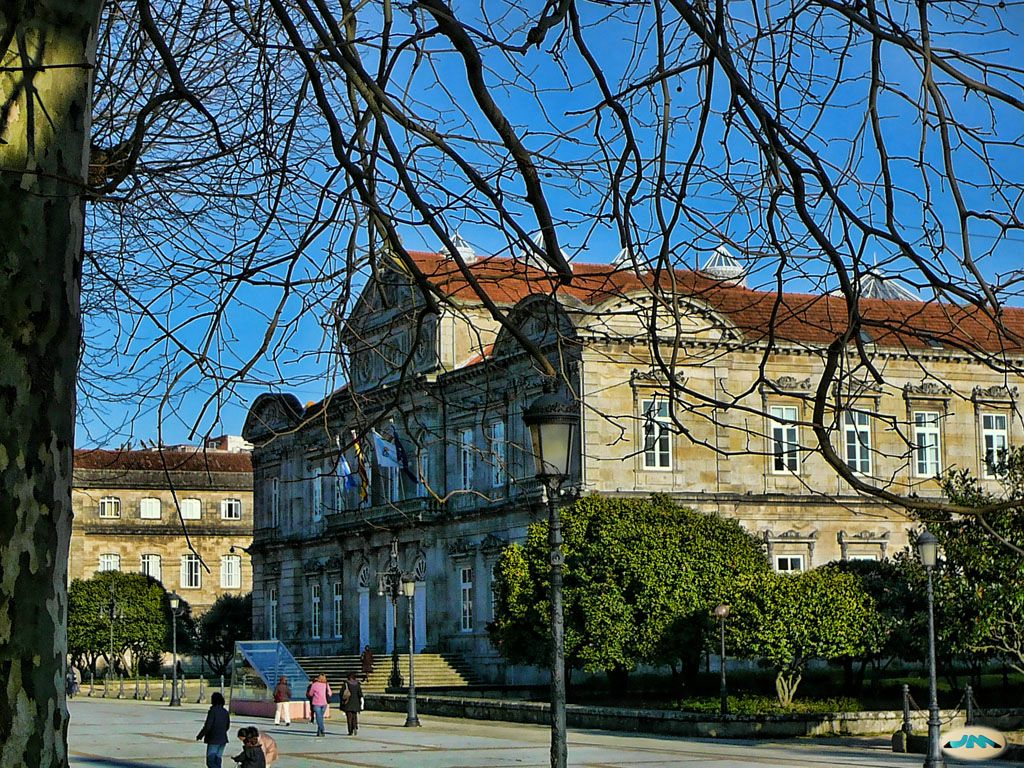

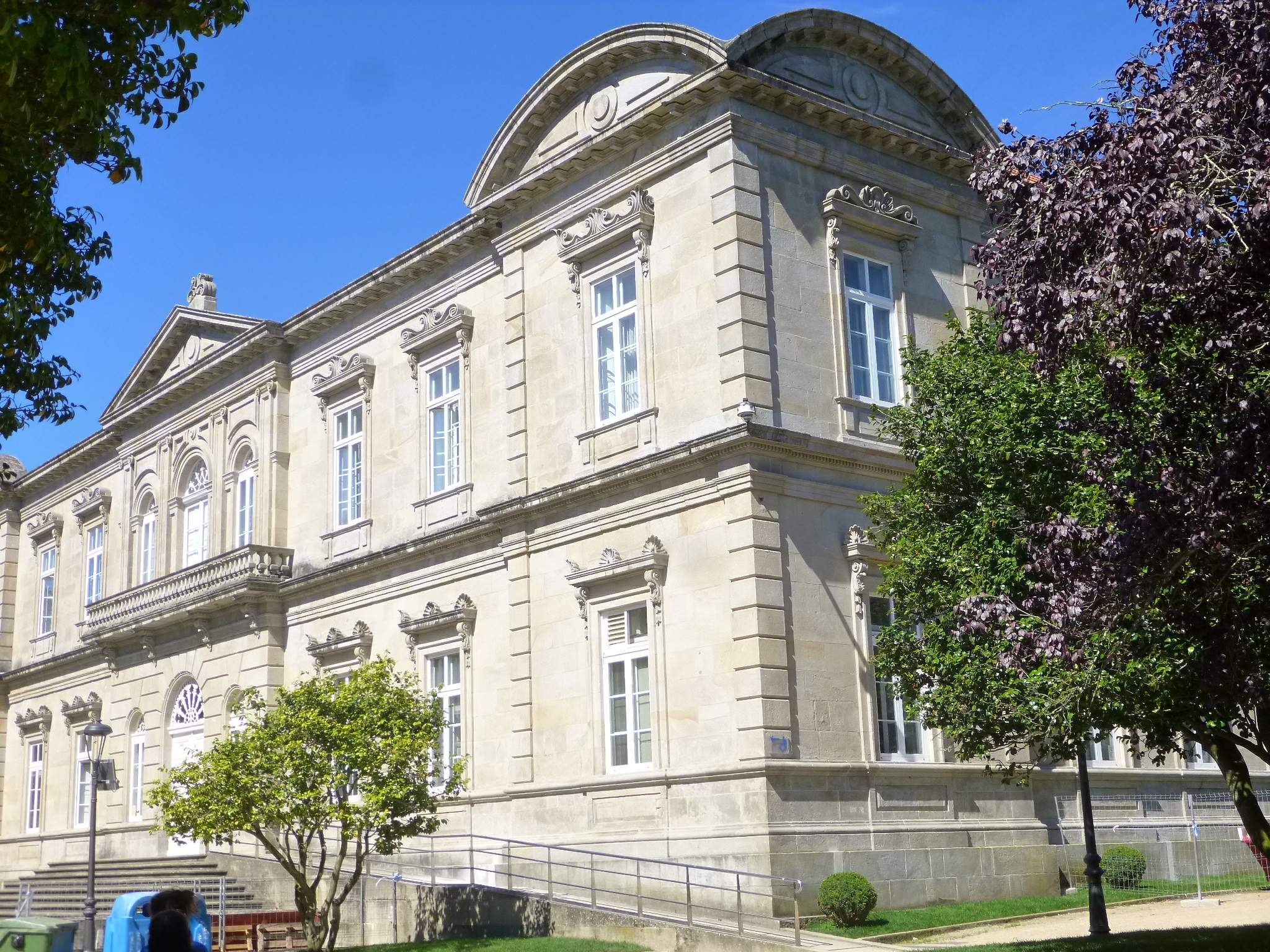
Rear facade of the palace

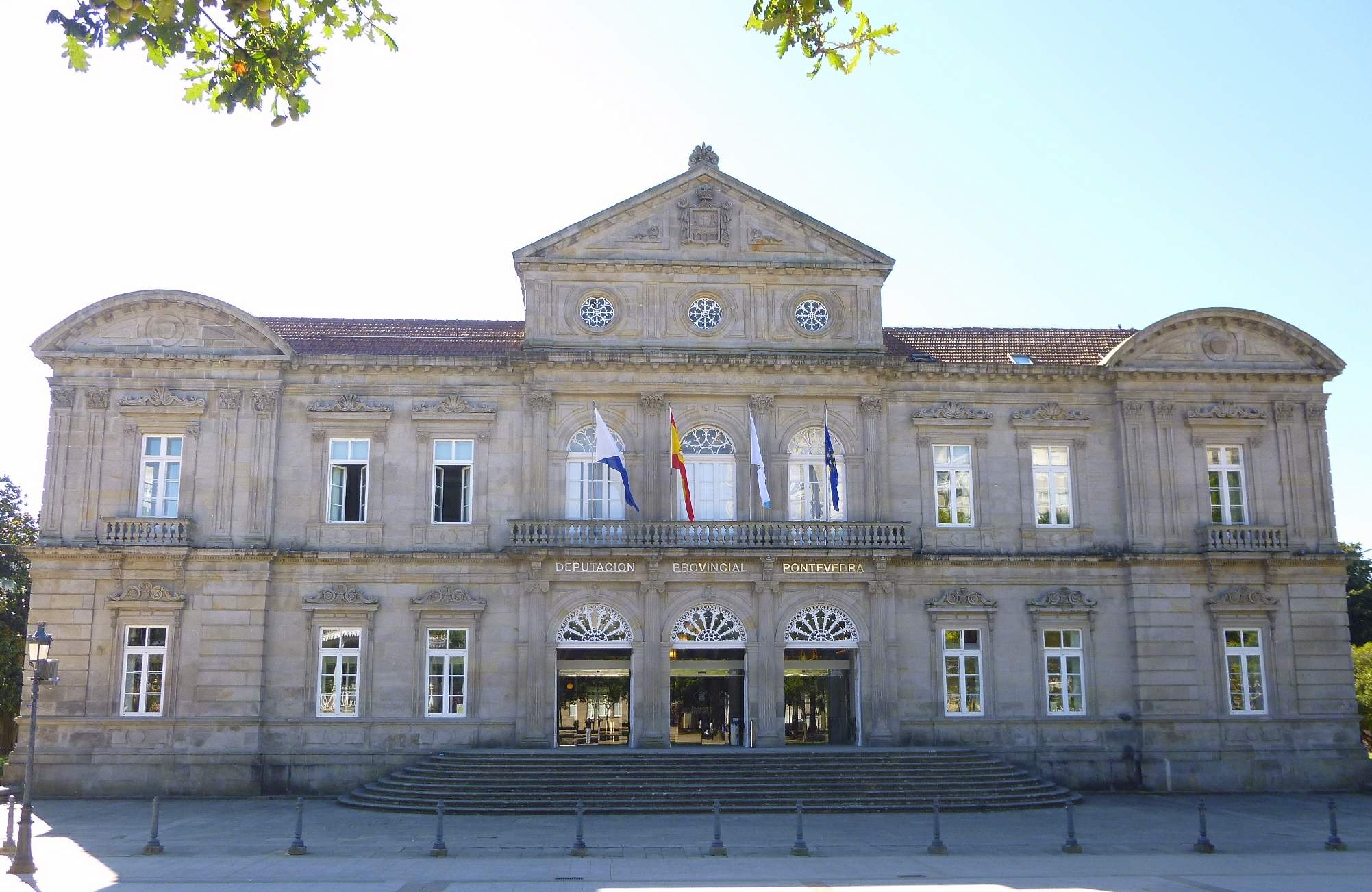

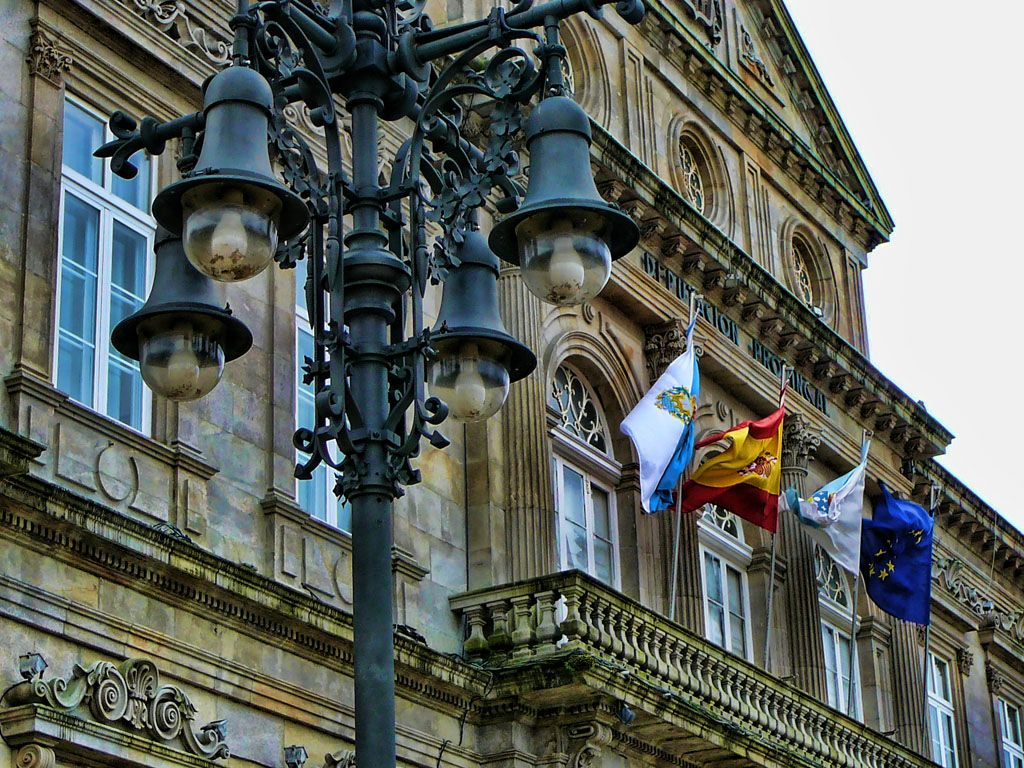

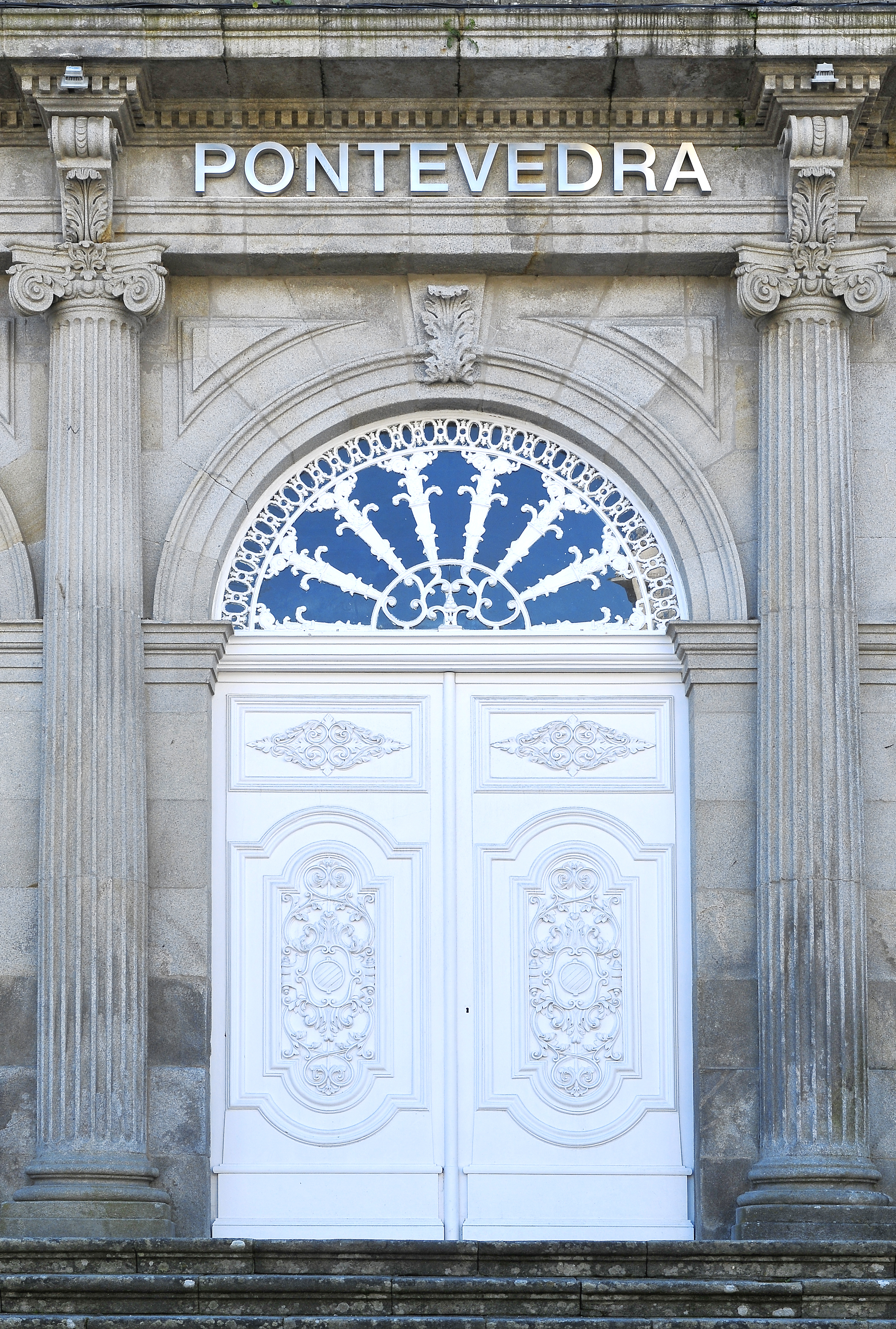

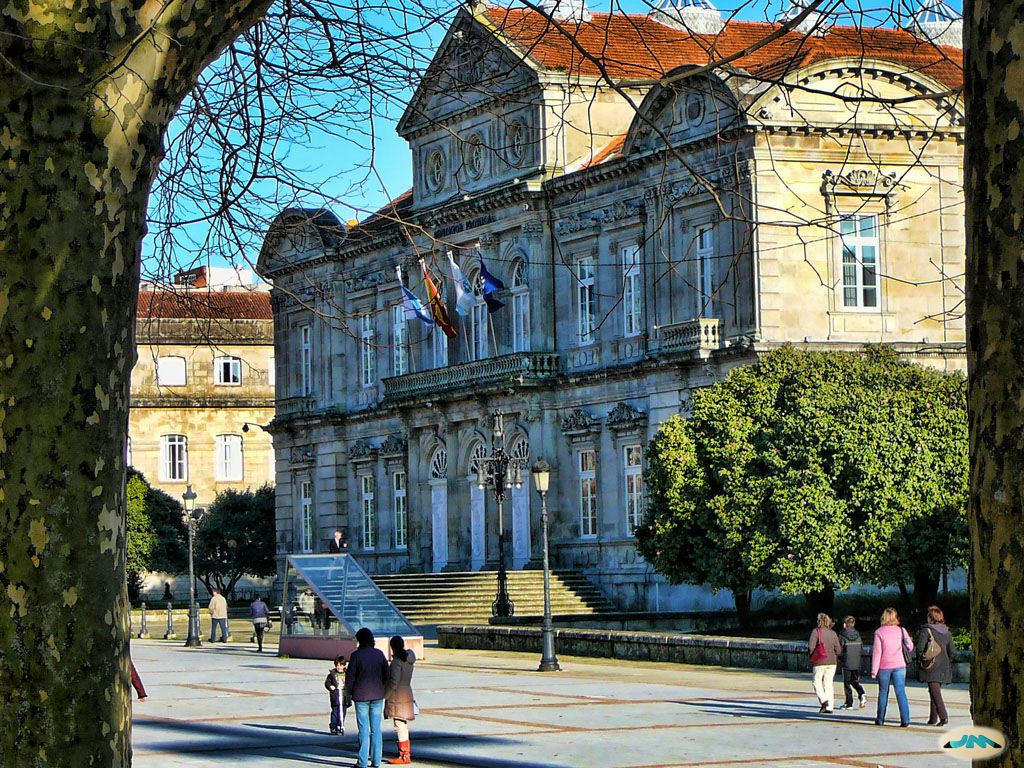

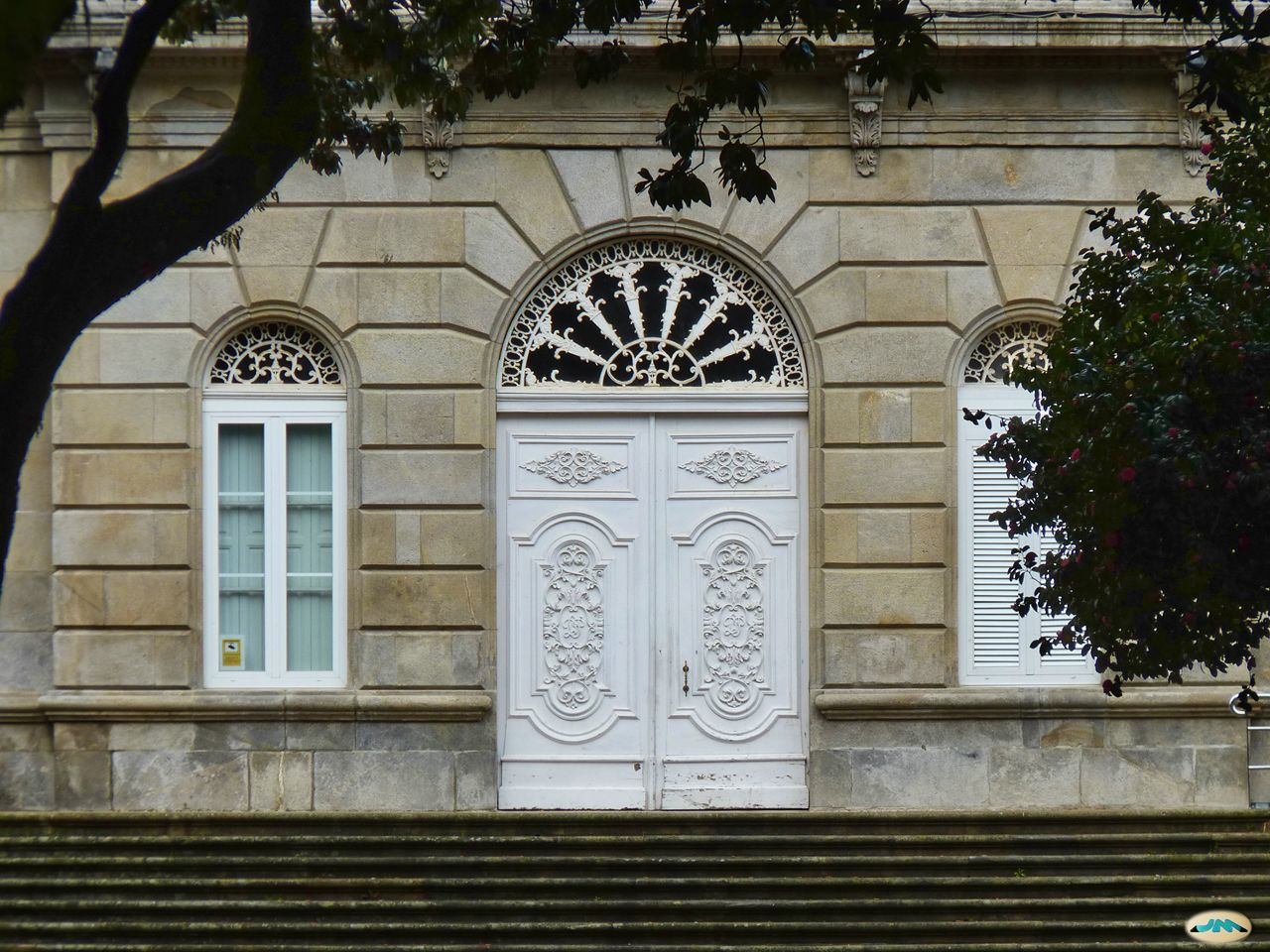

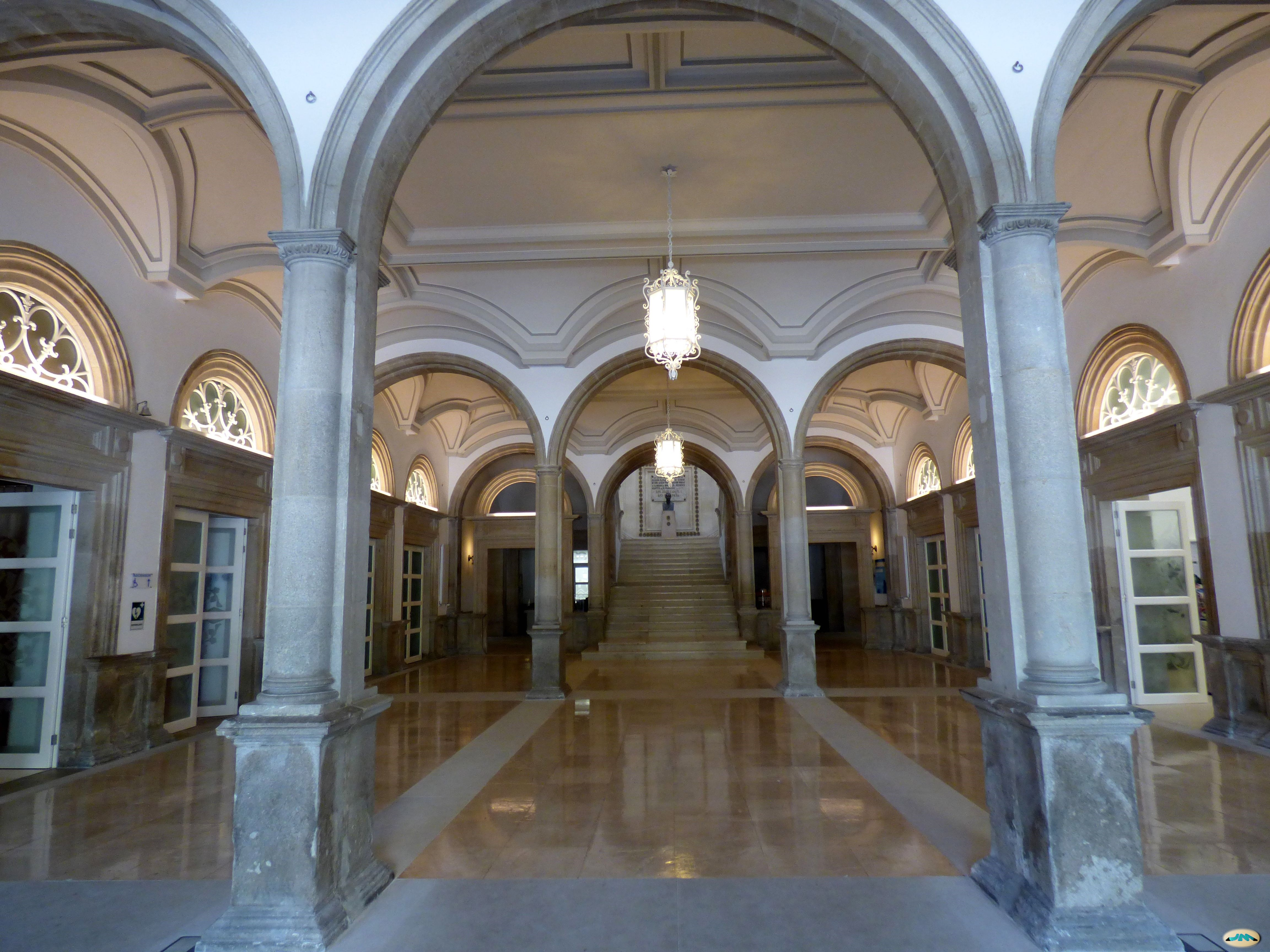

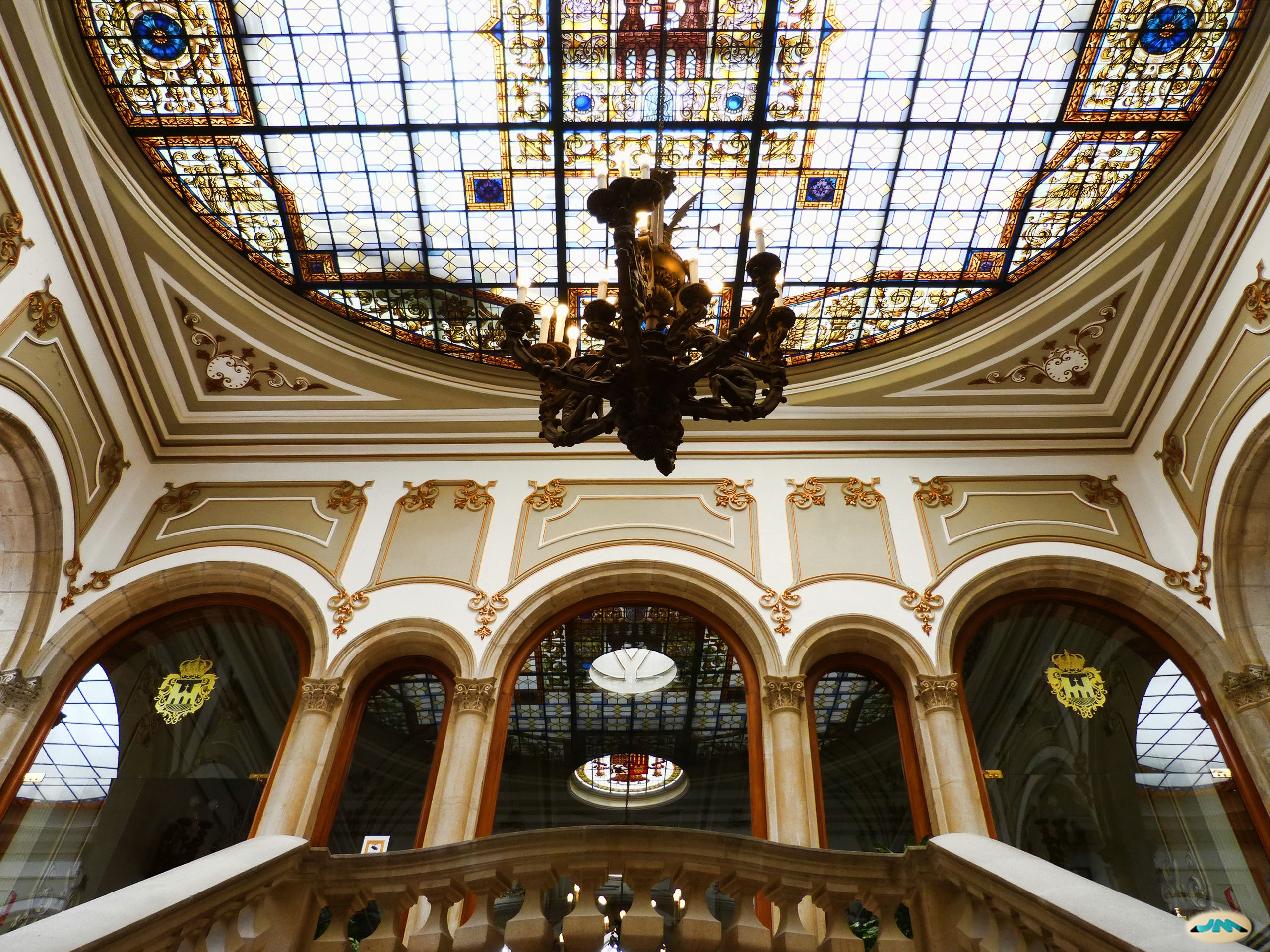

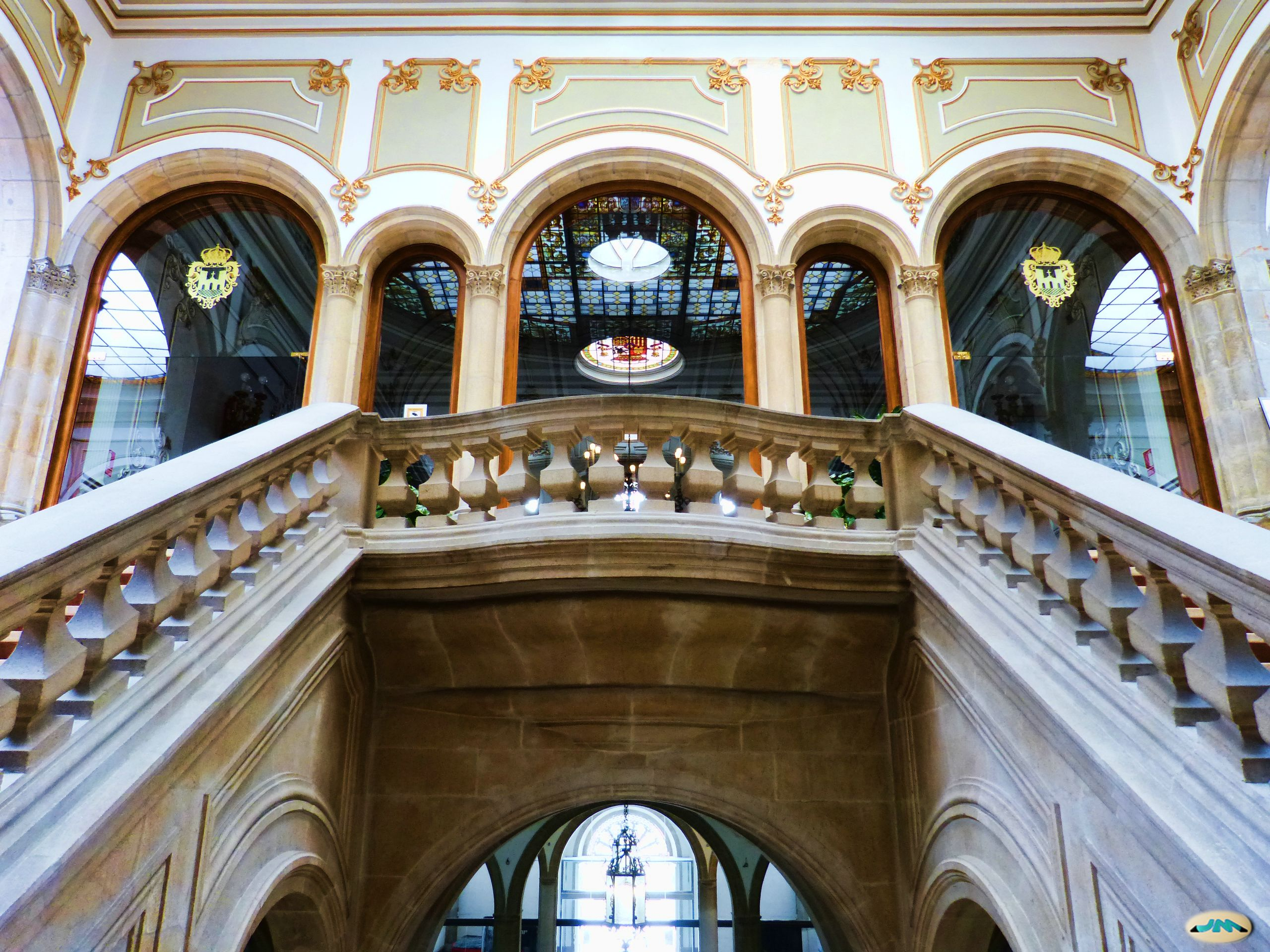

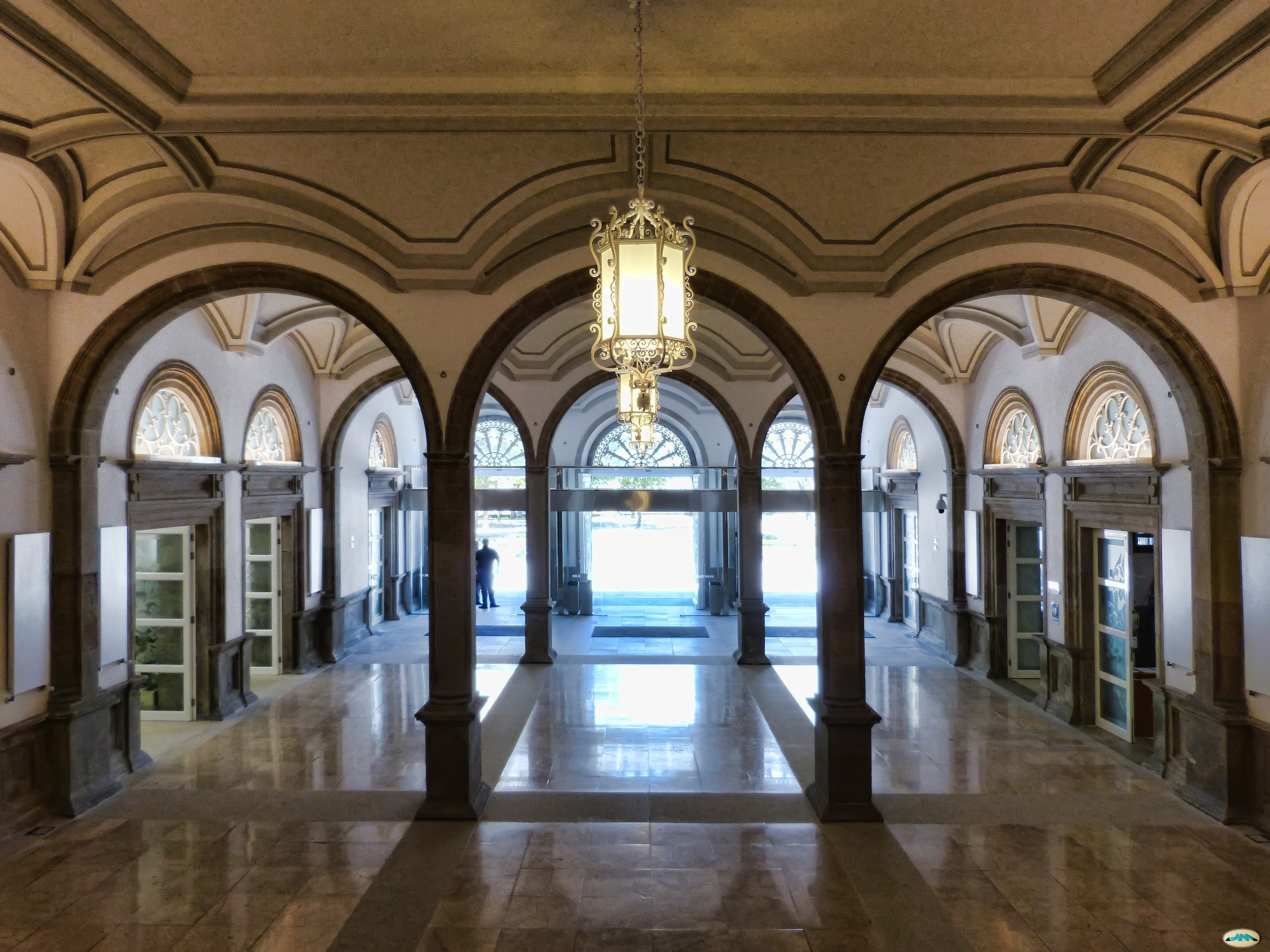

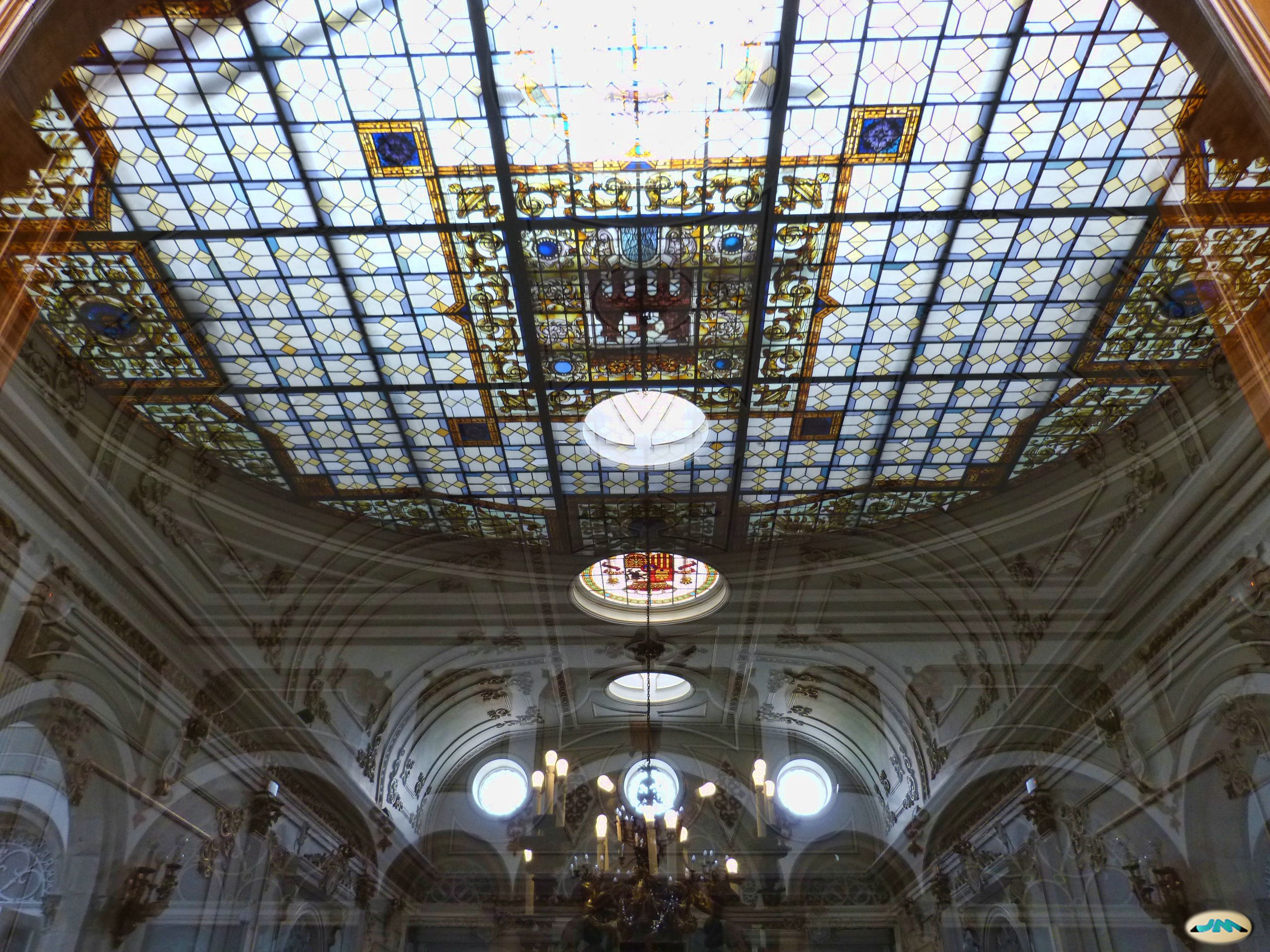
Skylight and stained glass window with the coat of arms of the province of Pontevedra

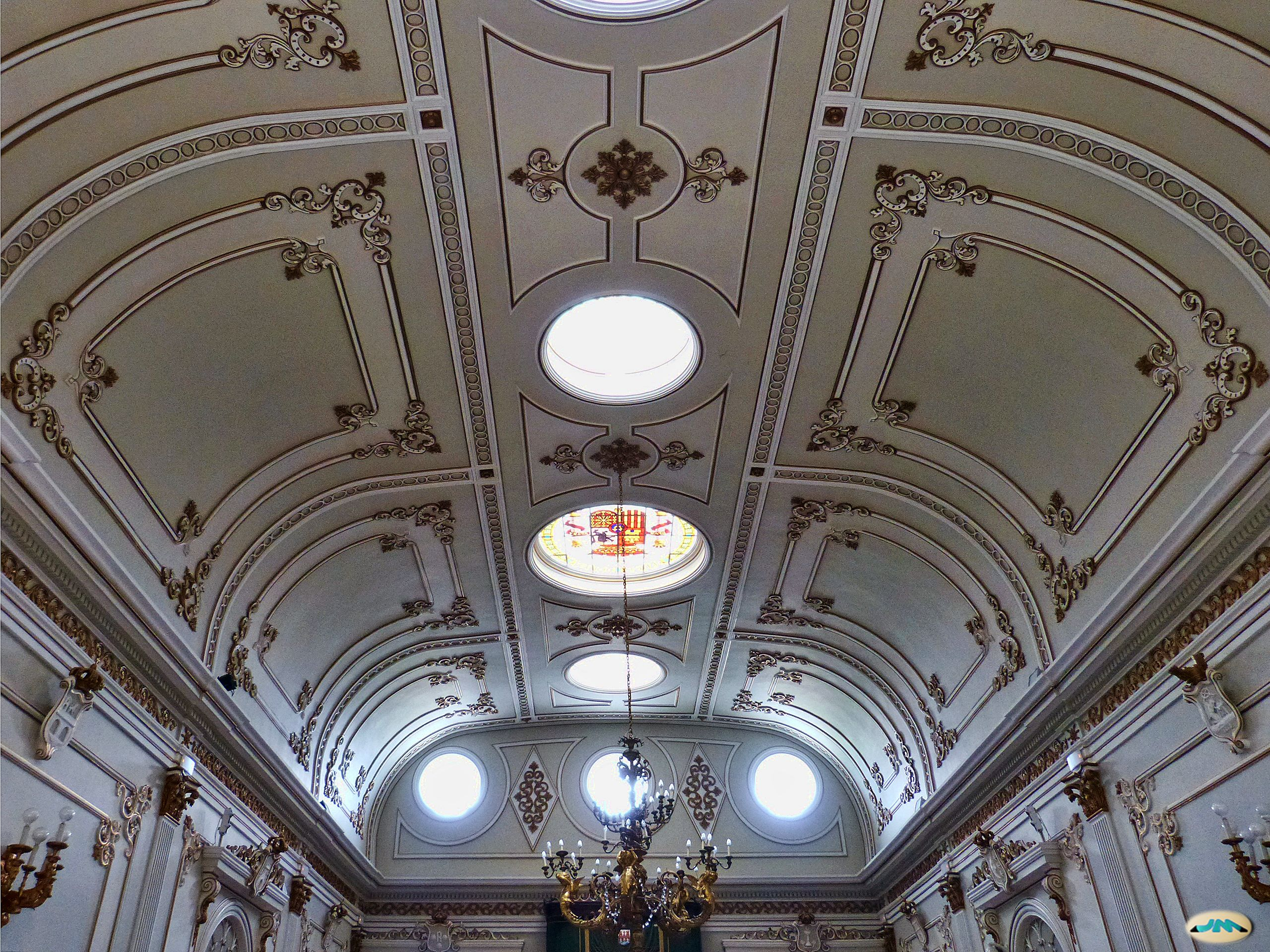

== See also ==
=== Bibliography ===
- Aganzo, Carlos (2010). Pontevedra. Ciudades con encanto (in Spanish). Madrid: El País-Aguilar. p. 92-93. ISBN 978-8403509344.
- Fontoira Surís, Rafael (2009). Pontevedra monumental (in Spanish). Pontevedra: Diputación Provincial de Pontevedra. p. 415-416. ISBN 978-84-8457-327-2.
- Riveiro Tobío, Elvira (2008). Descubrir Pontevedra (in Spanish). Pontevedra: Edicións do Cumio. p. 48. ISBN 9788482890852.

=== Related articles ===
- Gran Vía de Montero Ríos
- Alameda de Pontevedra
- Palm Trees Park
- Hôtel de ville de Pontevedra
- Mendoza Mansion

=== External links ===
- Palacio de la Diputación de Pontevedra on the website Visit-Pontevedra
- Palacio de la Diputación de Pontevedra on the website Galicia Tourism
- Pazo provincial de Pontevedra on the website Diputación de Pontevedra
