= Provincial Deputation of Pontevedra =

Government institution in Spain

- Diputación Provincial de Pontevedra; Deputación Provincial de Pontevedra
- Coat of arms

- Logo

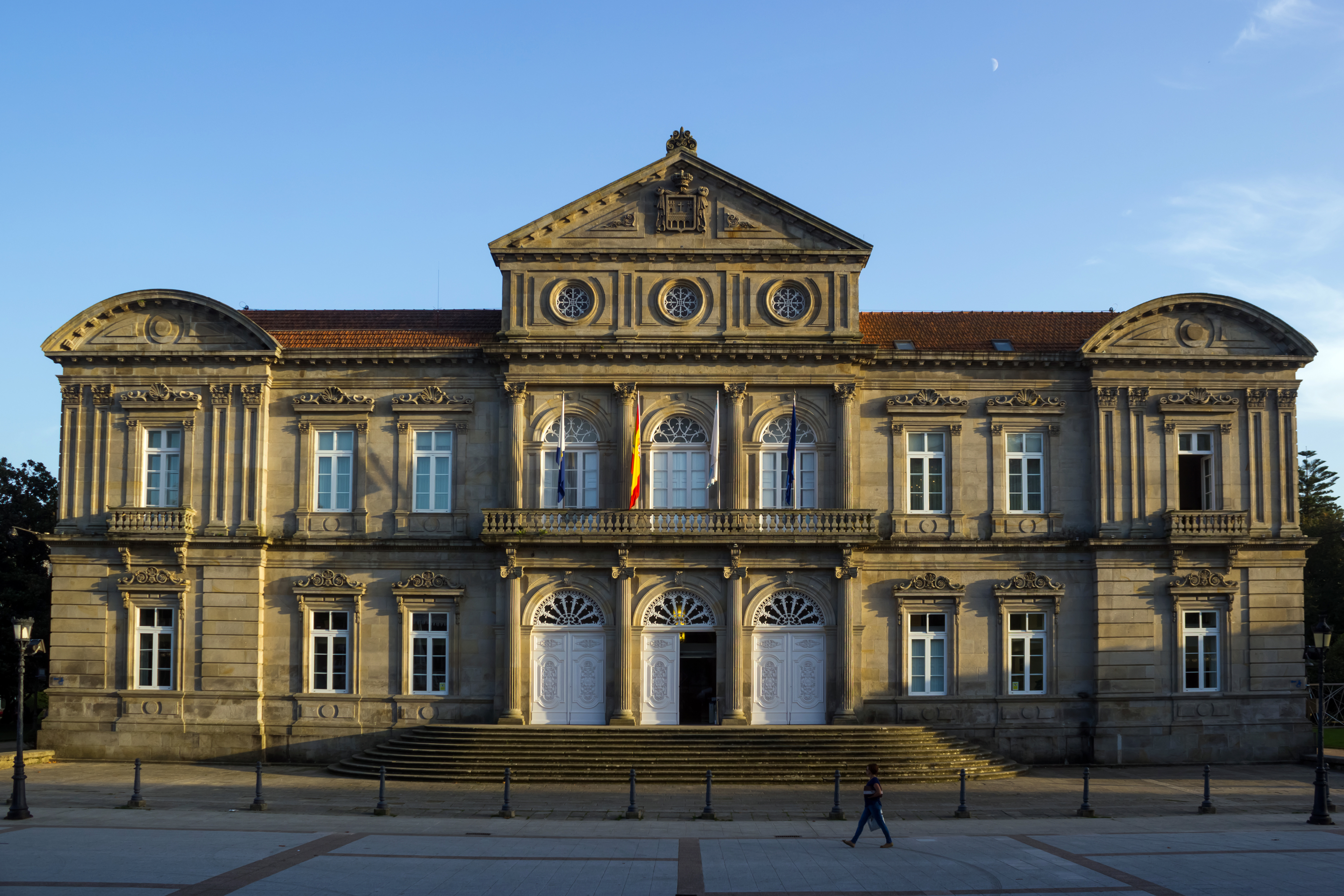

Provincial Deputation overview
- Formed: 12 February 1836
- Jurisdiction: Province of Pontevedra
- Headquarters: Palacio de la Diputación de Pontevedra. Pontevedra, Spain
- Website: www.depo.gal

The Provincial Deputation of Pontevedra (Spanish: Diputación Provincial de Pontevedra, Galician: Deputación Provincial de Pontevedra) or Provincial Council of Pontevedra is the institution in charge of the government and administration of the Spanish province of Pontevedra.

It provides technical, economic, and technological support to the local governments and administrations (ayuntamientos) of the 61 municipalities of the province, coordinates some municipal services, coordinates services of a supramunicipal character and provides direct services to citizens. It is headquartered in the Palacio de la Diputación de Pontevedra in the city of Pontevedra and has a delegation in the city of Vigo.

The Provincial Deputation was established on 12 February 1836, after its creation by Royal Decree on 21 September 1835, as a result of the 30 November 1833 division of Spain into provinces in which Pontevedra was declared the provincial capital. At that time, it had responsibility for public works, education, and care of the poor; prior to the creation of the autonomous communities, provincial deputations were the only organ intermediate between municipalities and the central government of Spain.

== Presidents ==
On 26 April 1979, during the Spanish transition to democracy, the Deputation was reconstituted as a democratic entity. The presidents since then are:

- 1979–1983: Federico Cifuentes Pérez (UCD)
- 1983–1986: Mariano Rajoy Brey (AP)
- 1986–1987: Fernando García del Valle (AP)
- 1987–1990: Xosé Cuíña Crespo (PPdeG)
- 1990–1995: César José Mera Rodríguez (PPdeG)
- 1995–2003: Manuel Abeledo López (PPdeG)
- 2003–2015: Rafael Louzán Abal (PPdeG)
- 2015–2023: Carmela Silva Rego (PSdeG-PSOE)
- Since 2023: Luís López Diéguez (PPdeG)
