= Plaza Alonso de Fonseca =

Medieval square in Pontevedra, Spain

Alonso de Fonseca square
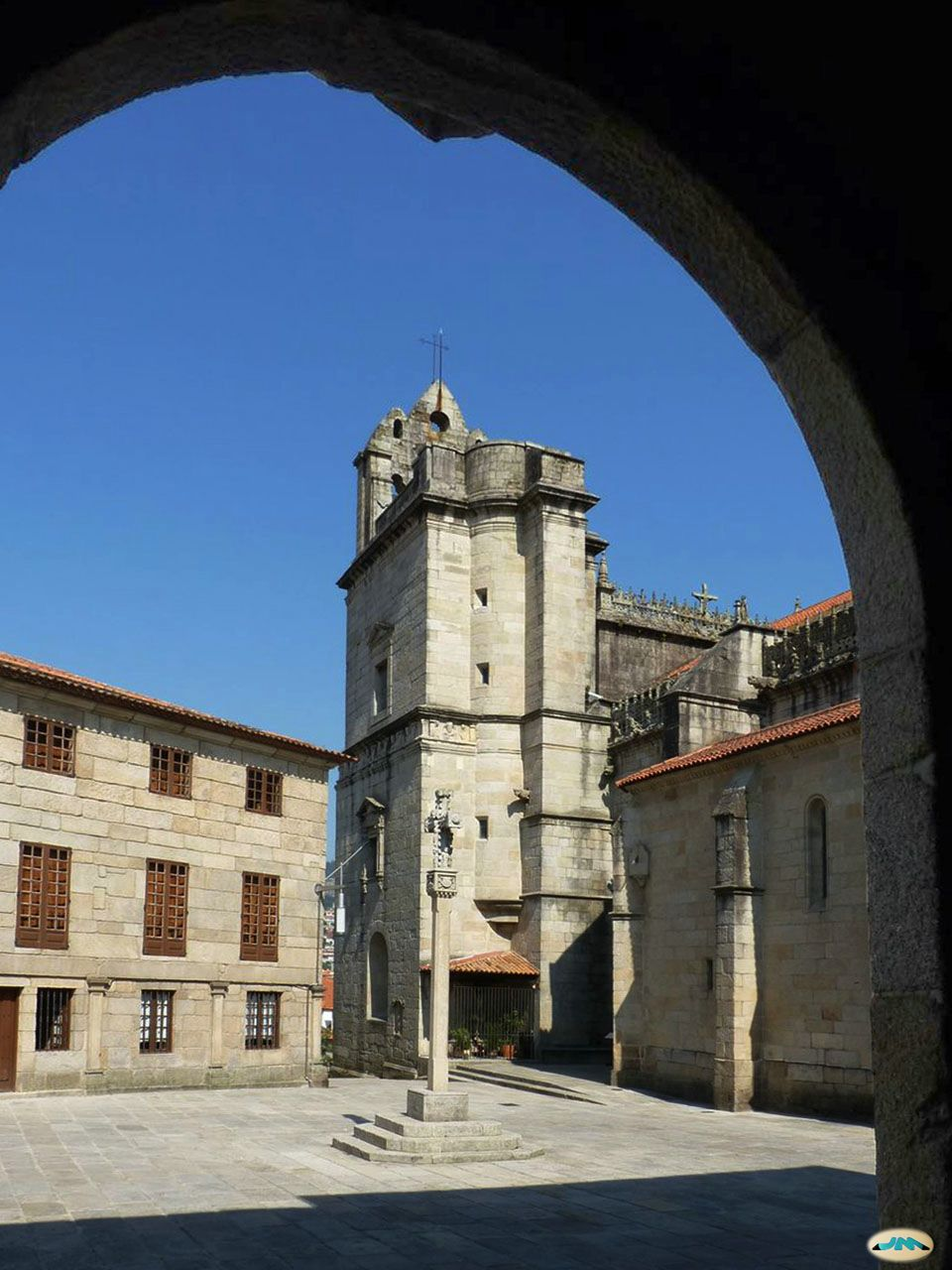
- The square with its 16th century calvary
- Native name: Plaza Alonso de Fonseca (Spanish)
- Type: plaza
- Maintained by: Pontevedra City Council
- Location: Pontevedra, Spain
- Postal code: 36002
- Coordinates: 42.433583°N 8.647556°W

Alonso de Fonseca Square is a medieval square located in the historic centre of the city of Pontevedra (Spain), opposite the Basilica of Saint Mary Major.

== Origin of the name ==
The square is named after Archbishop Alonso de Fonseca, who was appointed parish priest of the old church of Santa Maria de Pontevedra in the early 16th century, during the Renaissance period. Alonso de Fonseca encouraged the construction, financed by the Seamen's Guild, of the new Basilica of Santa María, which retains a coat of arms with the five stars of the Fonseca family on the chevet.

== History ==
In the Middle Ages, Pontevedra had a square inside the primitive walls, next to one of the most important churches in the city, a Romanesque church that was replaced centuries later by the Basilica of Saint Mary Major. This place, located at the highest point of the historic centre, was the core of the old Pontevedra, where the city was born. This square was an open space known as Plaza da Eyra or Campo da Eyra since the 13th century.

In late-medieval Pontevedra, the square became the parvise and cemetery of the church of Santa Maria. Later, this square was the meeting place of the Confraternity of the Holy Body (founded in the 13th century), the Seamen's Guild, whose work financed the construction of the Basilica of Saint Mary Major. The construction of the new basilica radically changed the appearance of the square, which was dominated by the presence of the church, the clergy house (Casa Rectoral), the fortress and the archiepiscopal towers. In 1778, a side window was opened in the archiepiscopal fortress overlooking the square of Santa Maria. In 1873 the archbishop's towers were demolished, changing the appearance of the area around the square.

In 1954 (after having been located in various places in the surroundings), a 16th-century flamboyant gothic calvary from the former chapel of Santiago del Burgo, which stood next to the Burgo bridge before its demolition, was installed in the centre of the square.

The square was known for centuries as St Mary's Square until 1950, when it was named after Archbishop Alonso de Fonseca in recognition of his work in the city.

== Description ==
It is an irregularly shaped triangular square, situated on top of a hill in the old town, and is pedestrianised like the rest of the historic city centre. It is paved and retains the medieval atmosphere of the past.

It is dominated by the southern façade of the Basilica of Saint Mary Major, on the side of which is the usual entrance to the church. On the east side of the square is the Casa Rectoral de Santa María (the clergy house).

The square is presided over in the centre by a 16th-century calvary. On the upper part of the shaft, in a quadrangular shape, are the coat of arms of Pontevedra, the coat of arms of Archbishop Alonso de Fonseca, two intertwined anchors and a scallop shell. It is surmounted by a flamboyant Gothic cross with flower petals at the ends, with Christ on one side and the Virgin and Child on the other. At the foot of the cross are four figures, including the Apostle St. James, and it is traditional for pregnant women to pray before the cross, next to the Burgo bridge, after pouring water from the river over their bellies. A shaft and a pedestal with steps were added to the cross in 1950.

Following on from the square was the Eirado of the Archiepiscopal Towers (today's Santa María Avenue), where there is a 19th-century iron fountain of French design, dating from 1887. On the site of the demolished Archiepiscopal Towers is the Mendoza mansion, completed in 1880, and the manor house of the former Saint Mary's Clinic, built in 1945. The Eirado of the Towers had a defensive function, that of preventing damage caused by enemy artillery.

== Outstanding buildings ==
The southern façade of the Basilica of Saint Mary Major stands out in the square. The construction of the basilica was financed by the powerful brotherhood of the Seamen's Guild, which lived in the A Moureira neighbourhood, at the foot of its façade. The basilica dates from the 16th century and was built in a late Gothic and Renaissance style with Manueline influences. The main façade, in the Plateresque style, is the work of Cornielles of Holland and the Portuguese João Nobre and is the best example of a stone altarpiece in Galicia. The south façade, which faces the square, is notable for its highly worked Gothic cresting and its didactic reliefs with scenes from holy history and fables, as well as representations of the city and its walls. The interior is remarkable for its four-leaf clover rib vaults. The basilica is called the pearl of Galician art for the purity of its Gothic elements. Next to the entrance, on the south façade, is the Christ of the Good Voyage, to whom sailors used to pray before setting sail.

On the east side of the square is the Casa Rectoral de Santa María. It is a Renaissance house dating from the 16th century and contemporary with the Basilica of Saint Mary Major. It was originally a tower house that formed part of the first defensive and religious complex in Pontevedra. The doorway has a semicircular arch with five large voussoirs typical of the Renaissance, and a coat of arms on the central voussoir with the arms of the Menelau or Menelao family. On the façade of the house, an inscription recalls that Alonso de Fonseca lived in the town: A Don Alonso de Fonseca 1473-1534, Cura de esta feligresía, Arzobispo de Santiago y de Toledo, Patrono magnífico de Ciencias, Letras y Artes La ciudad de Pontevedra de la que fue confesor. Año MCMLIX ("To Don Alonso de Fonseca 1473-1534, priest of this parish, archbishop of Santiago de Compostela and Toledo, magnificent patron of the sciences, letters and arts. The city of Pontevedra, whose confessor he was. Year MCMLIX").

On the west side of the square is an 18th-century Baroque house, whose ground floor doors and windows are separated by pilasters with classical capitals.

== Gallery ==
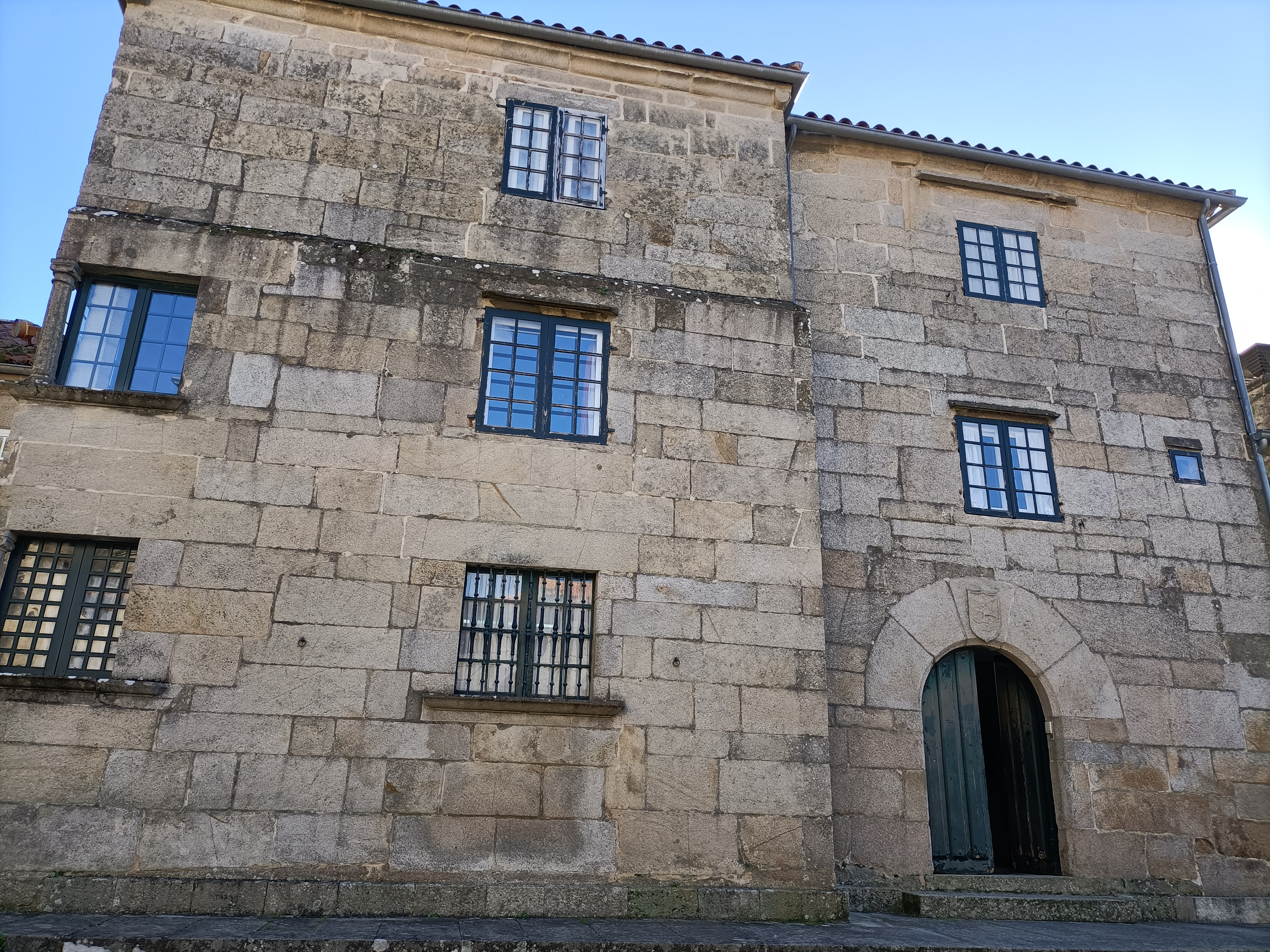
16th-century Renaissance rectory house

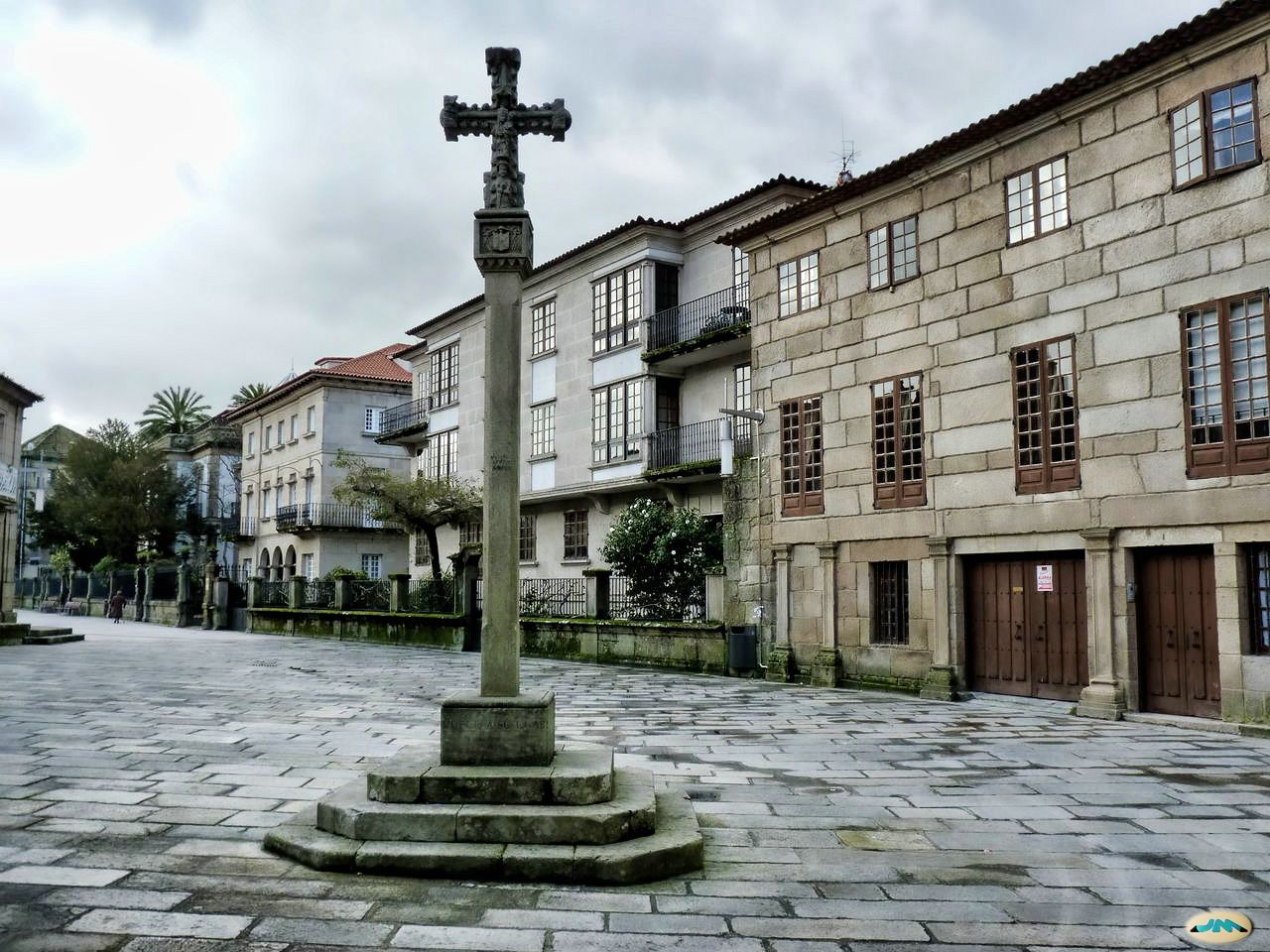
The 16th century Calvary in the centre of the square

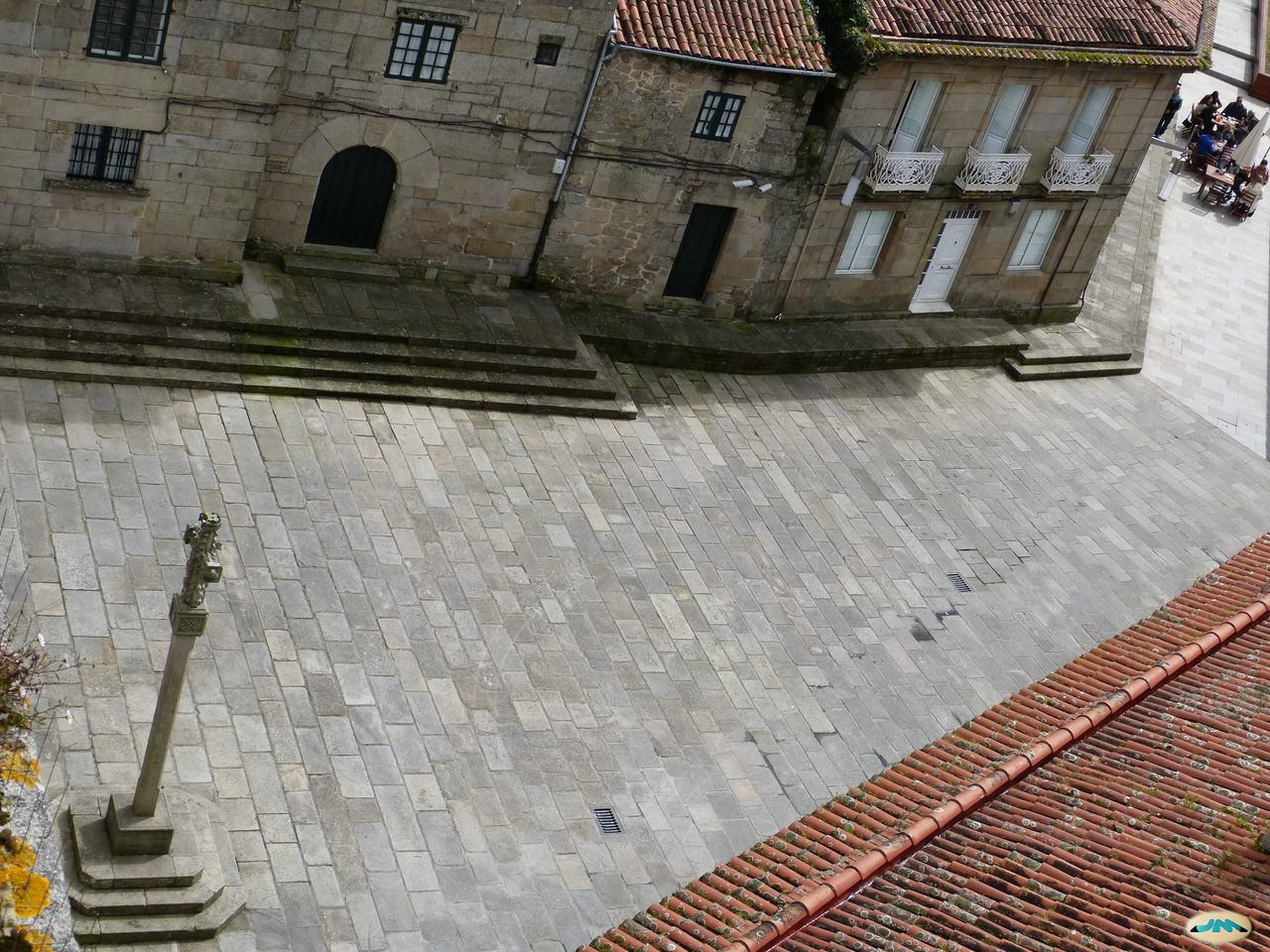
The square seen from the bell tower of the Basilica of Saint Mary Major

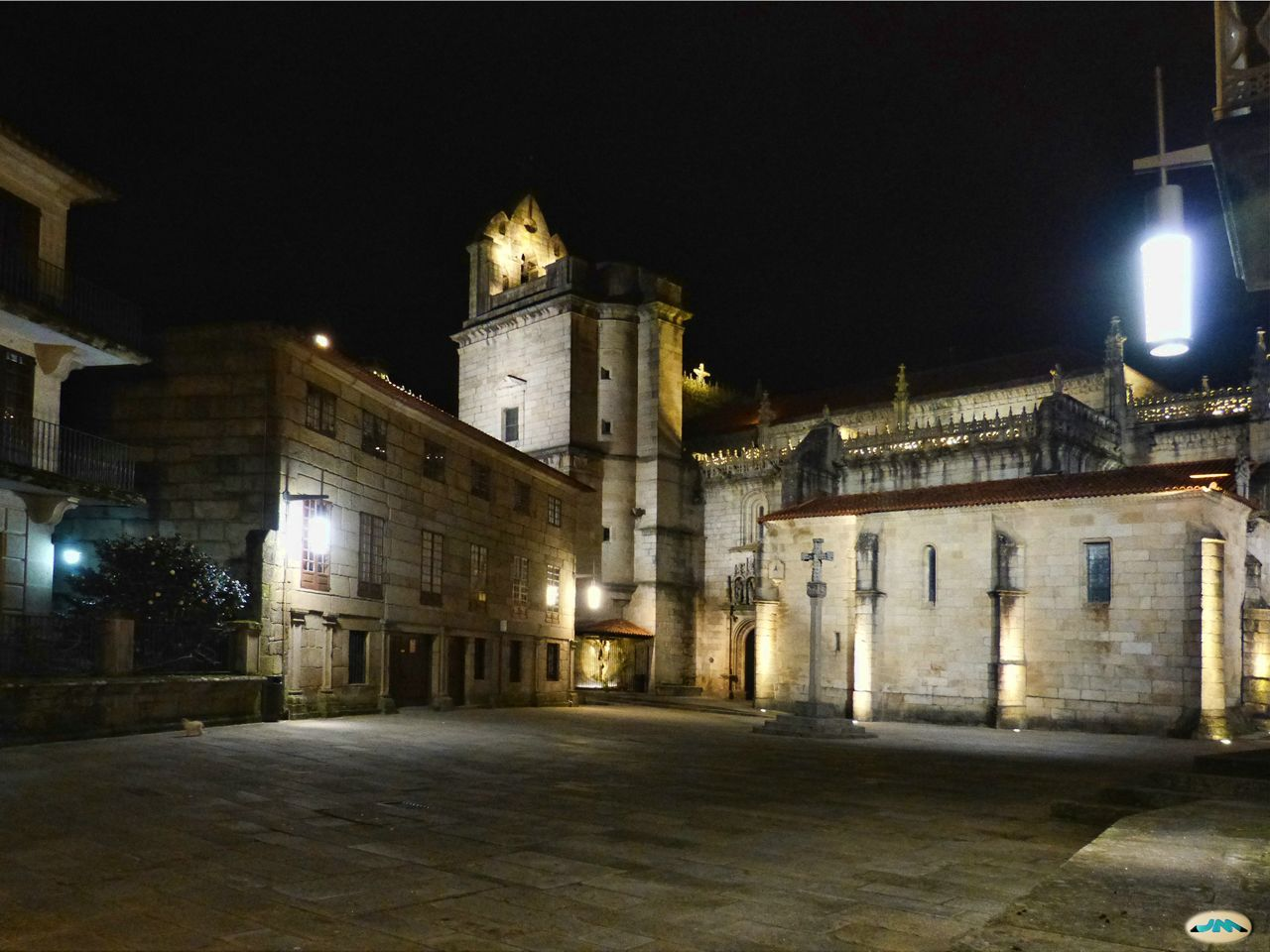
The square at night

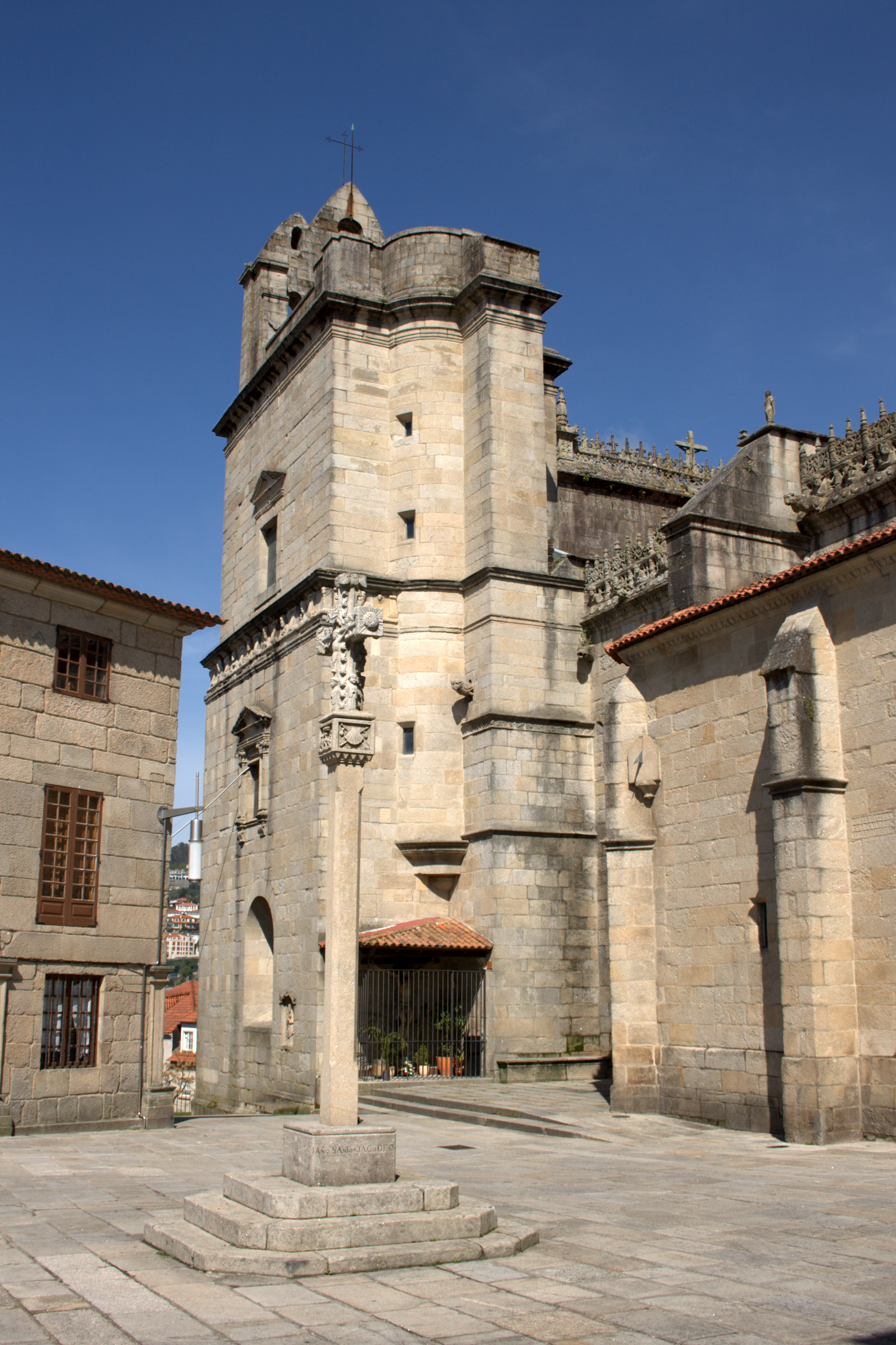
Calvary and southern façade of the basilica

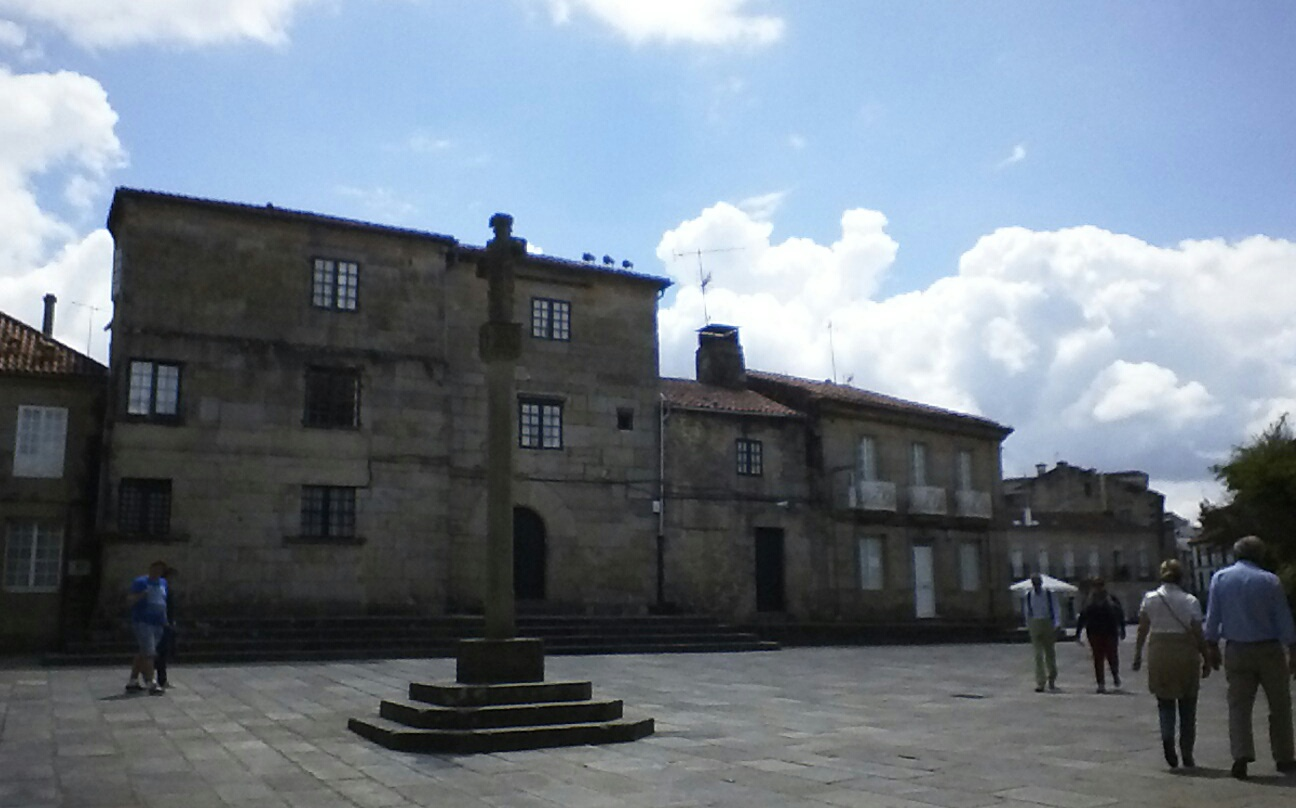
Calvary in front of the Casa Rectoral (clergy house)

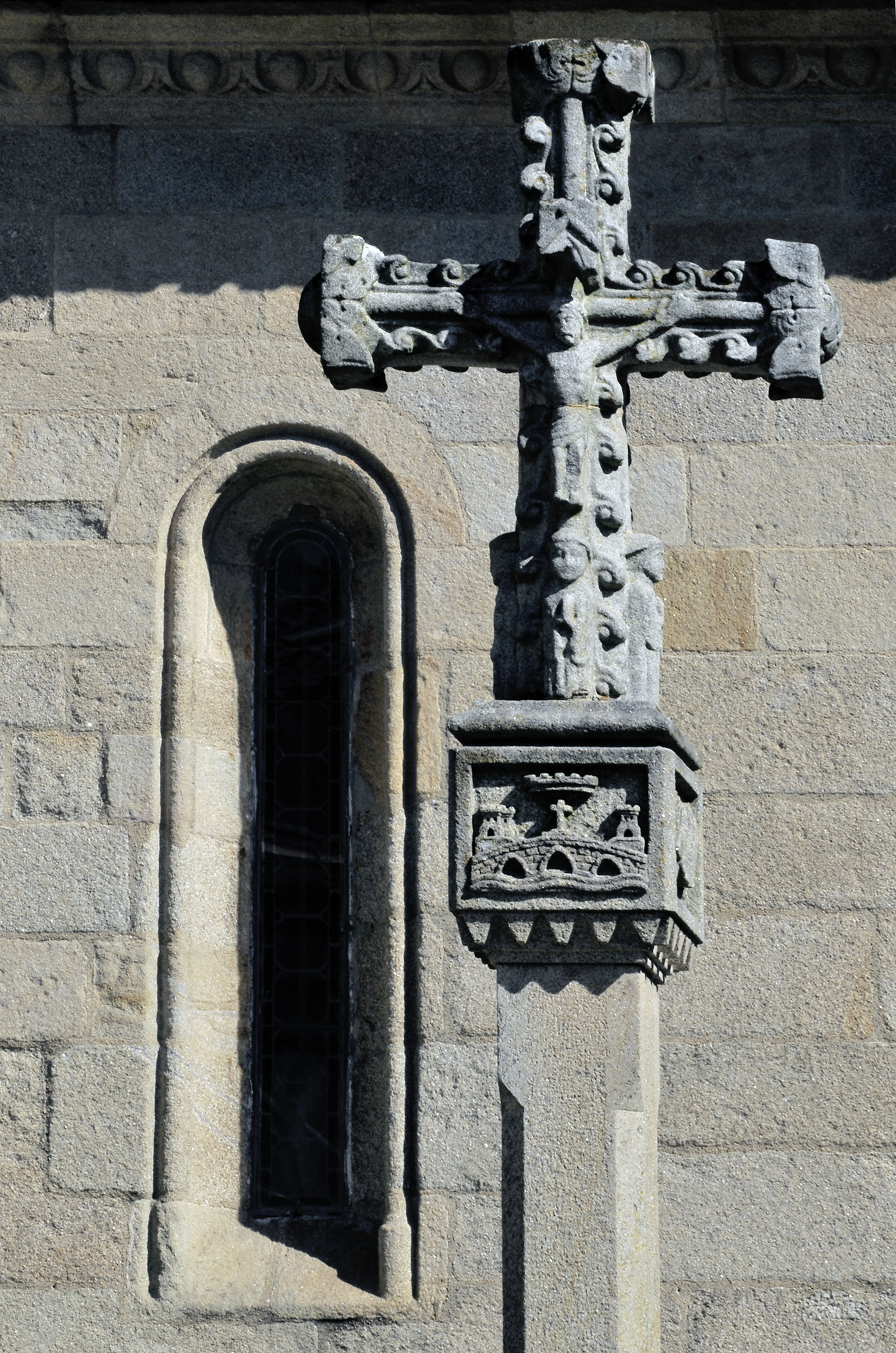
Flamboyant Gothic Calvary

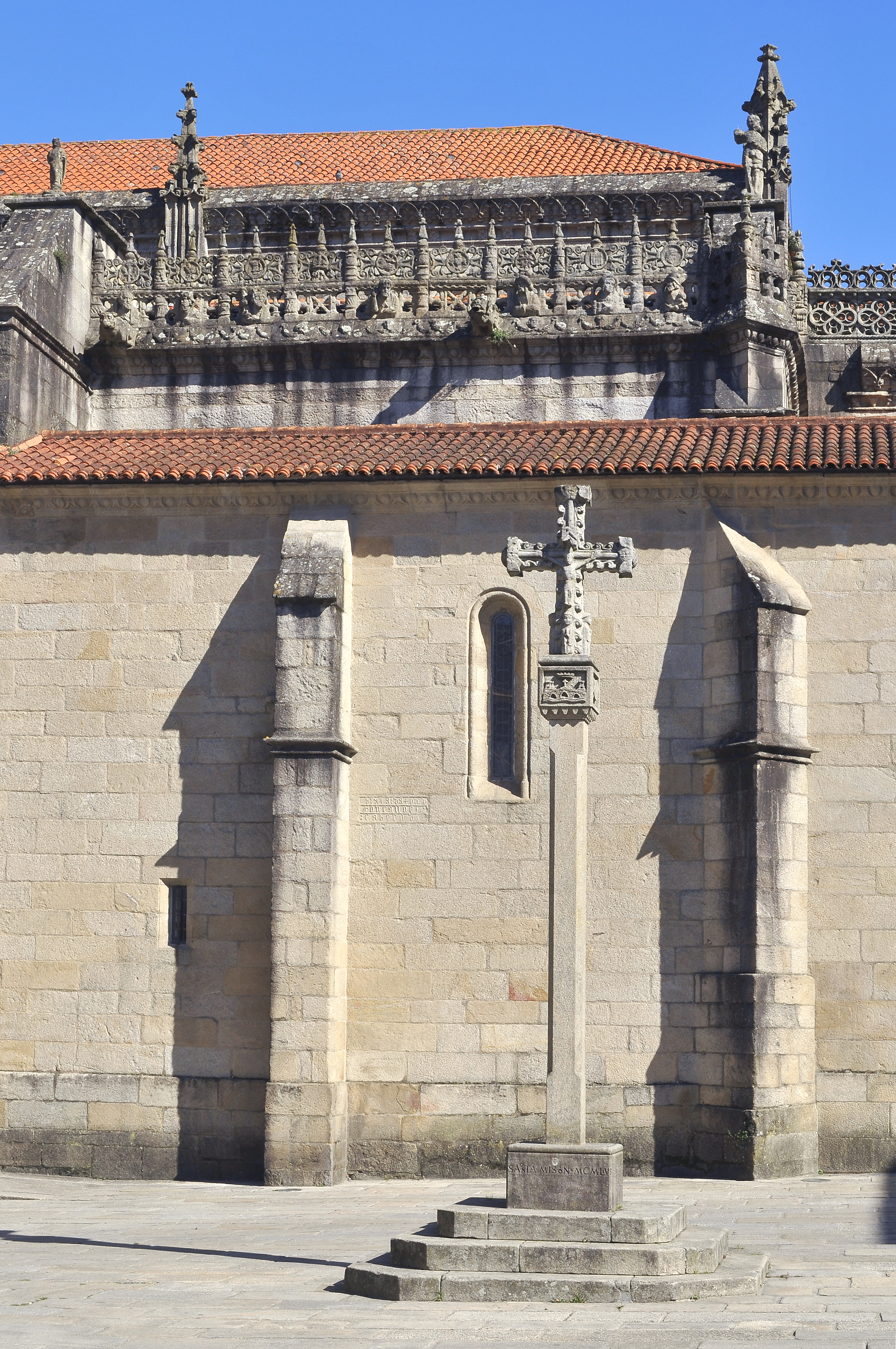
Gothic cresting of the Basilica of Saint Mary Major

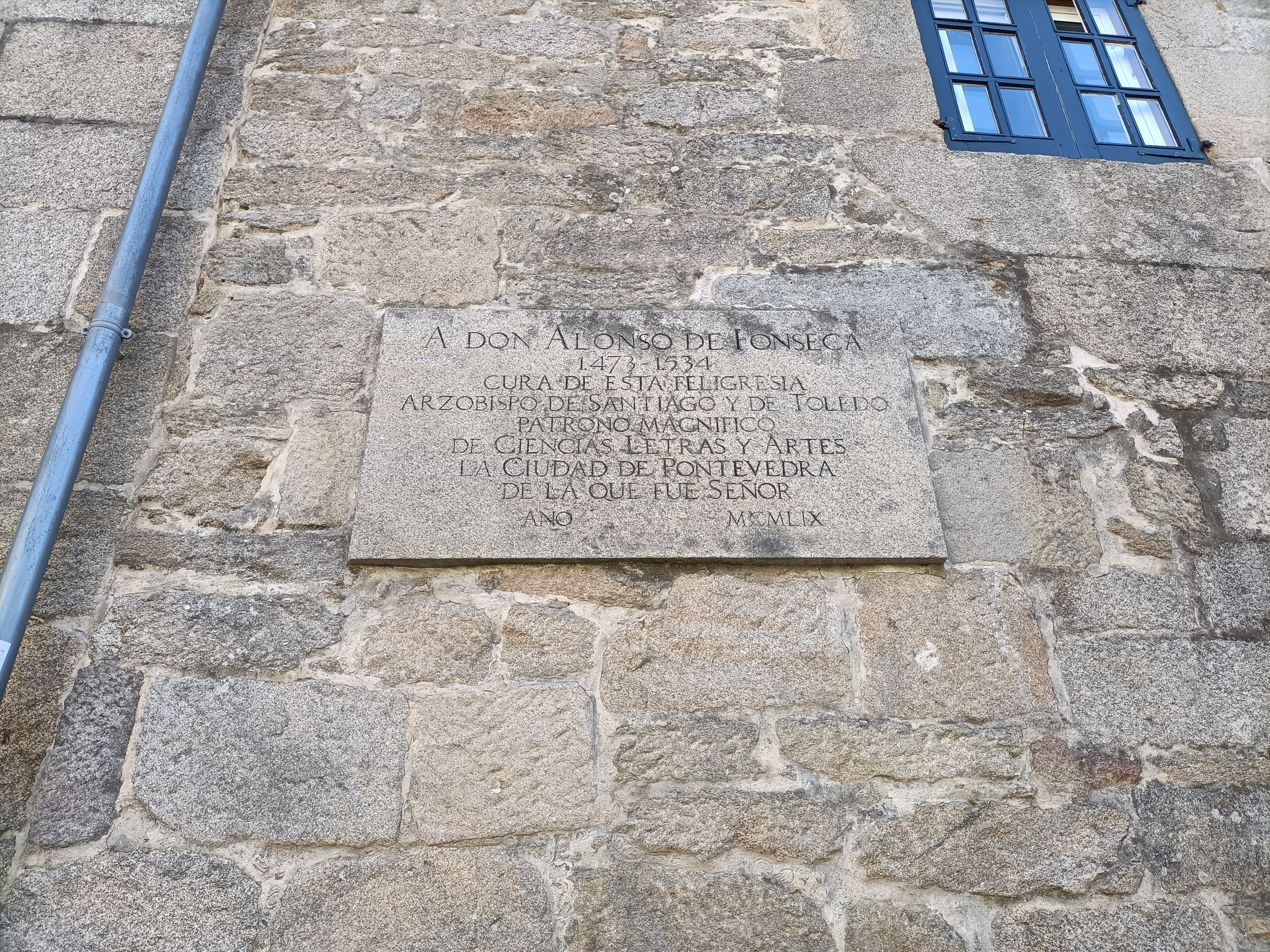
Plaque dedicated to Alonso de Fonseca on the square

== See also ==
=== Bibliography ===
- Aganzo, Carlos (2010). Pontevedra. Ciudades con encanto (in Spanish). Madrid: El País-Aguilar. pp. 74–78. ISBN 978-8403509344.
- Álvarez Pérez, Belén (2021). Pontevedra en la baja edad media: trazado urbano, arquitectura civil y militar (Thesis) (in Spanish). Santiago de Compostela: Universidad de Santiago de Compostela. p. 113; 122.
- Armas Castro, José (1992). Pontevedra en los siglos XII al XV (in Spanish). A Coruña: Fundación Barrié. p. 95. ISBN 978-8487819339.
- Fernández Martínez, Carla (2013). Iconografía de una ciudad atlántica. Memoria e identidad visual de Pontevedra (Thesis) (in Spanish). Santiago de Compostela: Universidad de Santiago de Compostela. p. 388.
- Fontoira Surís, Rafael (2009). Pontevedra monumental (in Galician). Pontevedra: Diputación de Pontevedra. pp. 213–218, 524, 531. ISBN 9788484573272.
- García Bujalance, Guillermo J. (2016). "Heráldica de la zona monumental de Pontevedra". Hidalguía: La revista de genealogía, nobleza y armas (in Spanish). 373: 702. ISSN 0018-1285.
- Riveiro Tobío, Elvira (2008). Descubrir Pontevedra (in Spanish). Pontevedra: Edicións do Cumio. pp. 26–27. ISBN 9788482890852.

=== Related articles ===
- Old town of Pontevedra
- Basilica of Saint Mary Major

=== External links ===
- Alonso de Fonseca Square on the City Plan website
- Casa Rectoral de Santa María on the Galicia Tourism website
