= Basilica of Saint Mary Major (Pontevedra) =

Gothic and renaissance basilica in Pontevedra, Spain

- Basílica de Santa María a Maior de Pontevedra
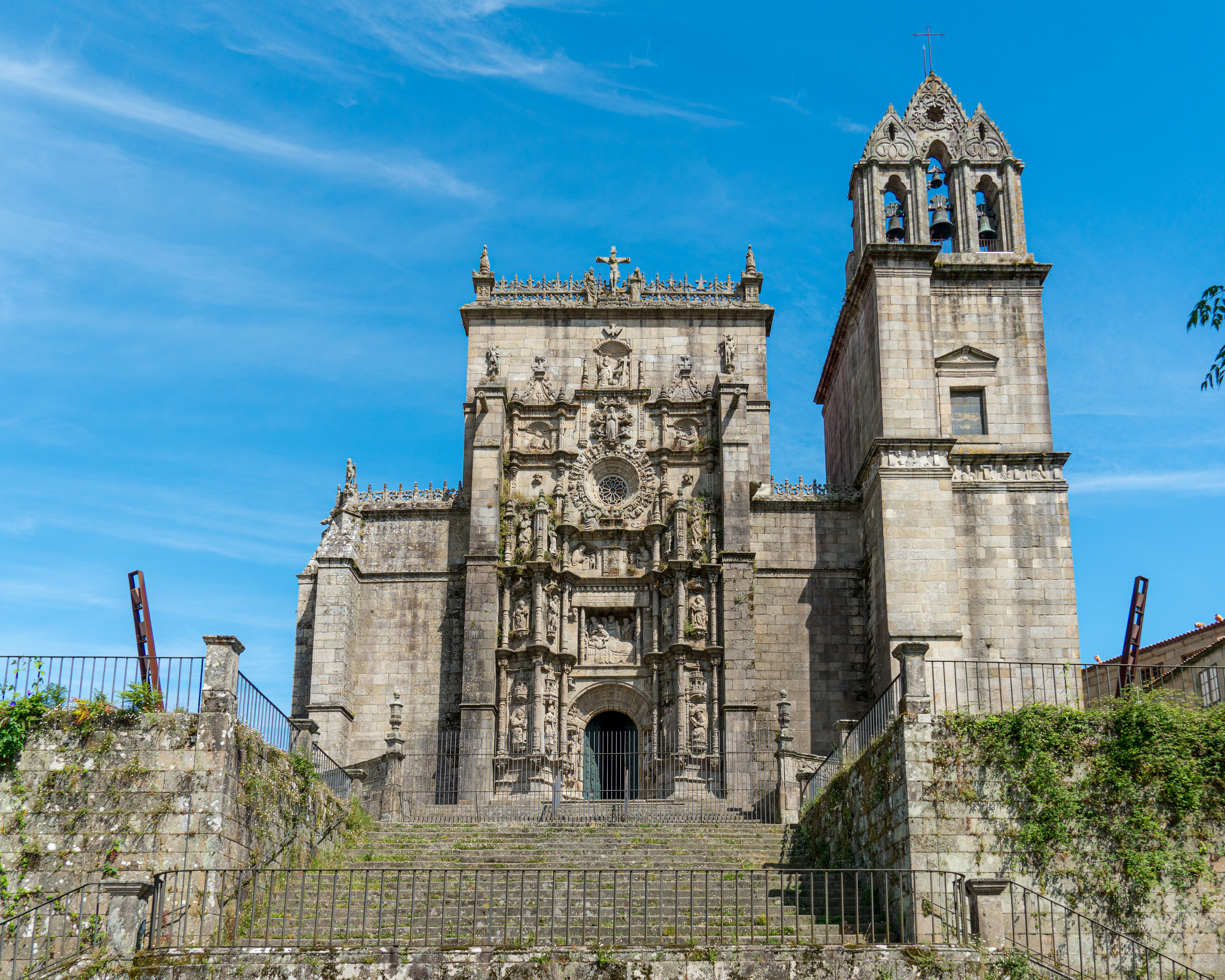
- The Western façade of the basilica.

Religion
- Affiliation: Catholic

Location
- Location: Pontevedra, Galicia, Spain
- Interactive map of Basilica of Saint Mary Major
- Coordinates: 42.433788°N 8.647516°W

Architecture
- Type: Basilica
- Style: Gothic, Renaissance
- Completed: 1559
- Direction of façade: West
- Spanish Cultural Heritage
- Official name: Basílica de Santa María la Mayor
- Designated: 3 June 1931
- Reference no.: (R.I.) - 51 - 0000828 - 00000

Website
- www.arteguias.com/basilica/basilicasantamarialamayorpontevedra.htm

The Basilica of Saint Mary Major (Galician: Basílica de Santa María a Maior de Pontevedra; Spanish: Santa María la Mayor) in Pontevedra, Spain, is a catholic church, dating from the 16th century, and consecrated as a basilica on January 10, 1962, by decree of Pope John XXIII. It is currently considered a BIC (Good of Cultural Interest in Spain, with the identification number RI-51-0000828). It was declared a historic-artistic monument belonging to the National Artistic Treasure by decree of 3 June 1931.

== History ==
The basilica of Santa Maria is considered Pontevedra's main church, functioning as a cathedral. It is located in the old town of Pontevedra, in the Alonso de Fonseca square, right in the same place where a small Romanesque church used to stand, which was demolished in the 15th century. Its construction was commissioned by the Guild of Seamen, the oldest civil entity in Pontevedra and the oldest sea guild in Spain. It was built following the plans of Juan de los Cuetos and Diego Gil, among others (Cornielis de Holanda, Mateo López, Sebastián Barros, Domingo Fernándes and Juan Noble).

== Description ==
It is a Gothic style building, with influences from the Portuguese Manueline style. Externally, its façades stand out. The main one, facing west, presents a wide staircase to access it. The structure is in the form of an altarpiece, with three abundantly decorated bodies (following the Plateresque style), the work of the masters Cornielles de Holanda and Juan Noble, and dated 1541. The door is in the central body and has a half-point arch framed by sculptures of St Peter and St Paul. In the upper part of the doorway a relief of the Dormition of Mary can be seen; and above the decoration in base to medallions in the shape of scallop shells, as well as sculptures of saints, biblical and even historical characters; and, even larger, a rose window (responsible for the lighting of the interior space), symbolising heaven. The façade is crowned by a calvary and the typical stonework of Portuguese Manueline style. Among the figures of the saints that appear in the decoration of this façade, the busts of Christopher Columbus and Hernán Cortés can be seen, which are situated to the sides of the rose window.

It also presents a façade on the south side of the building, with a half-point arch. It also presents a Manueline stonework crowning the walls and the apse of the temple, which presents a large decorated window in the Manueline style.

Regarding the interior, the church presents a basilical plan with three aisles (the central one with a Renaissance style predominance, while the other two, like the chapels, are influenced by the late Gothic style) and side chapels.

The basilica has multiple chapels: The larger chapel, the chapel of Christ, the chapel of the Angustias, the chapel of the Purísima, the chapel of the Trinity or the altar of the Sorrowful Virgin.

== Gallery ==
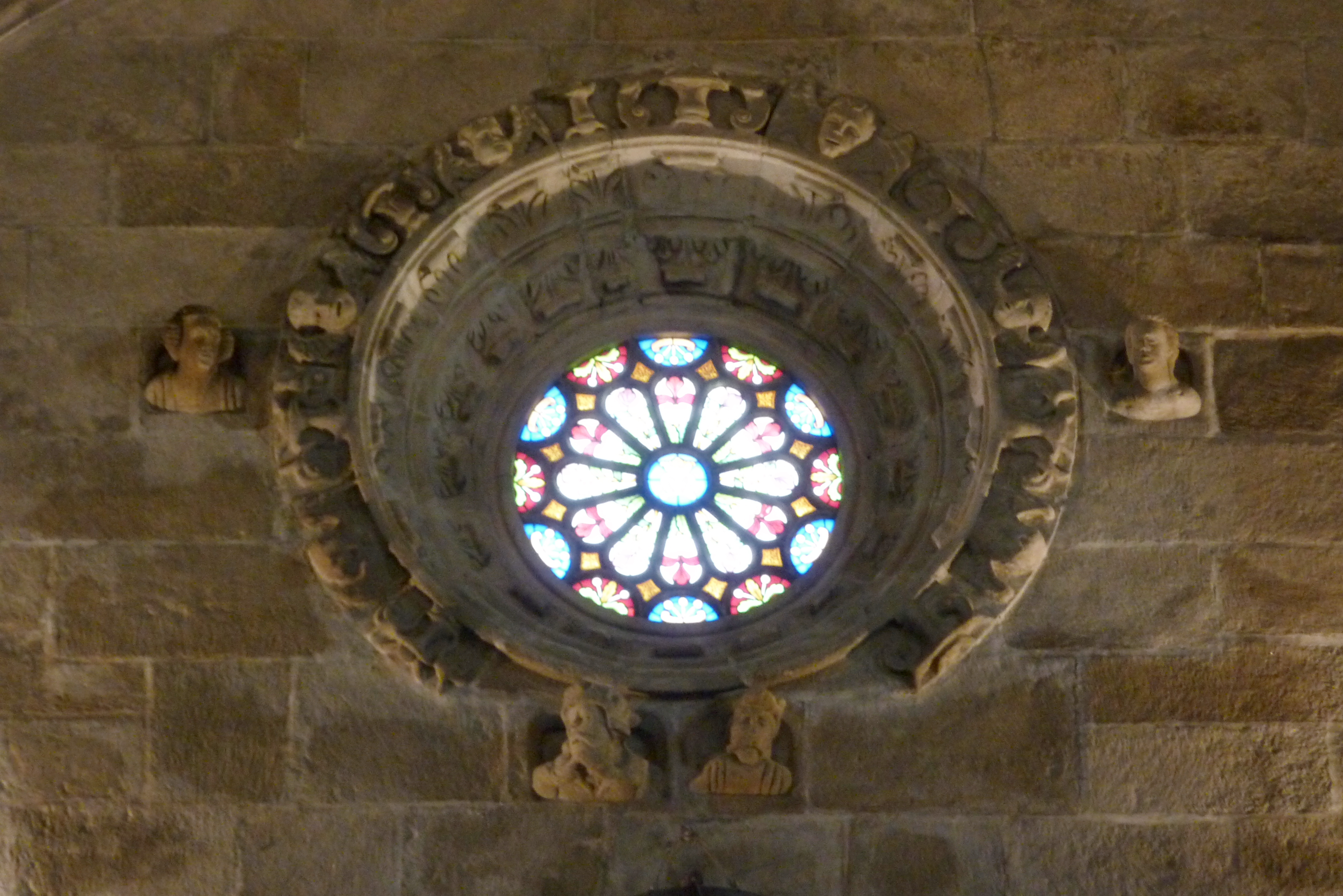
View of the interior of the rose window

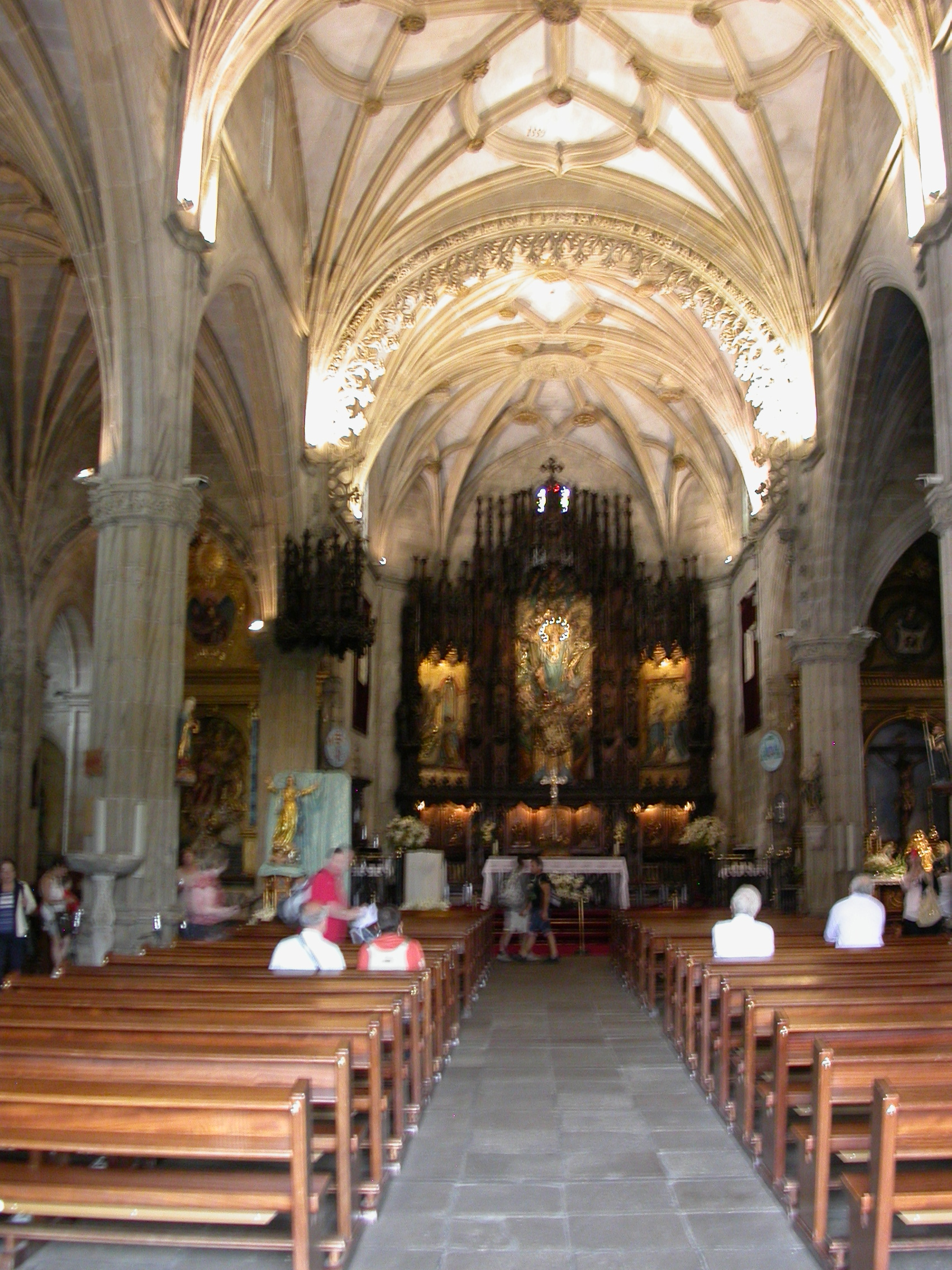
Central aisle

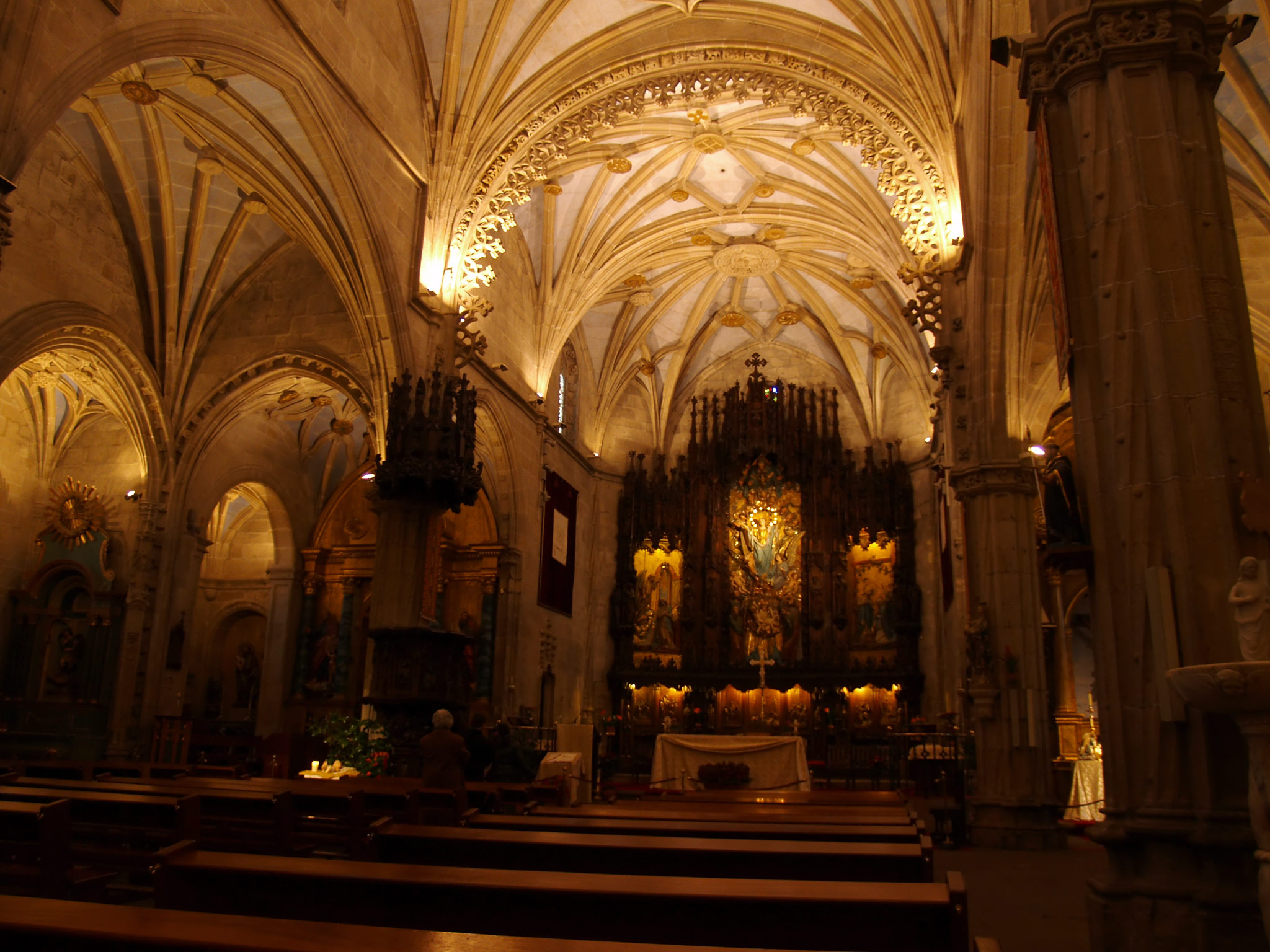
High altar and side aisles

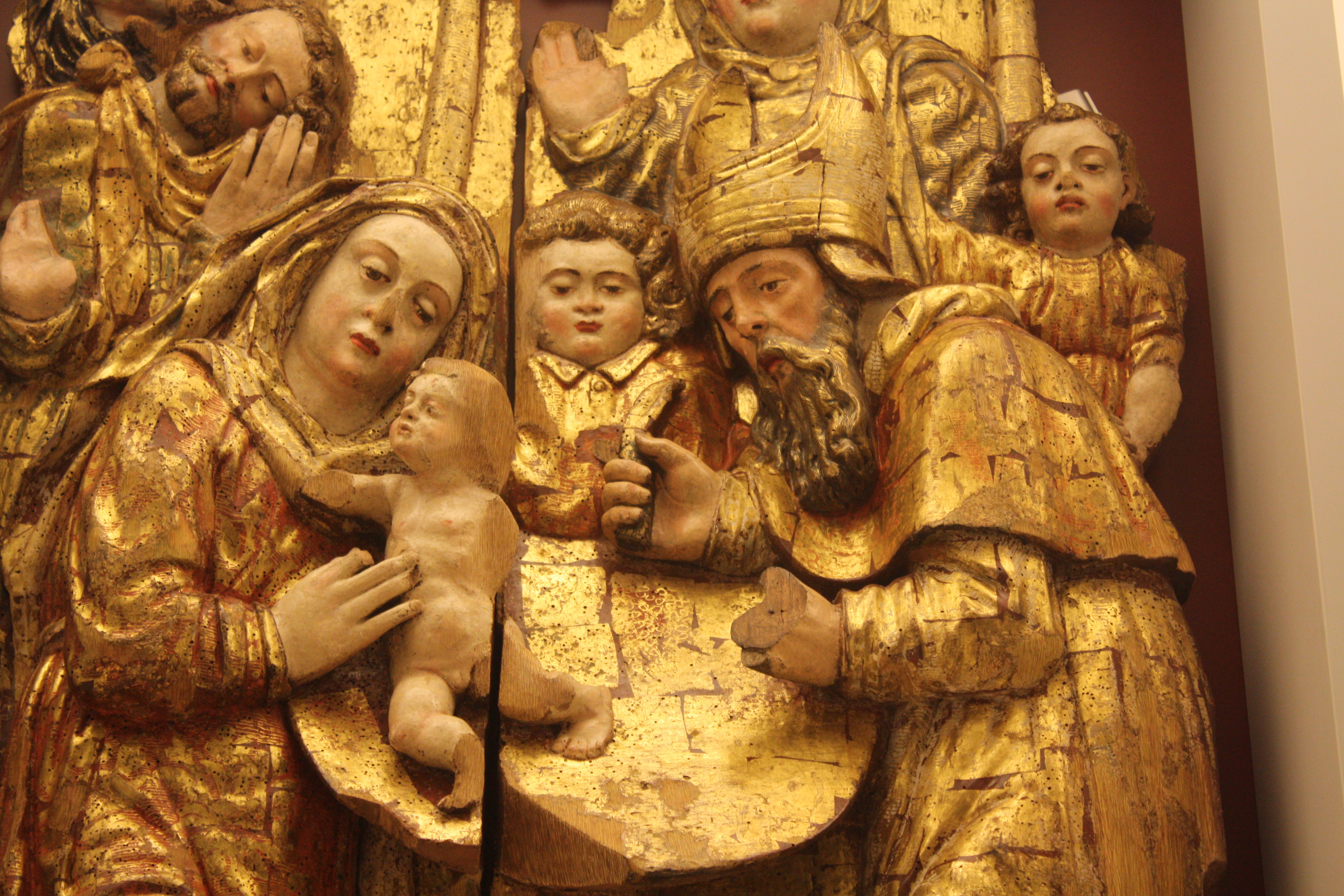
Detail of the altarpiece of Santa María

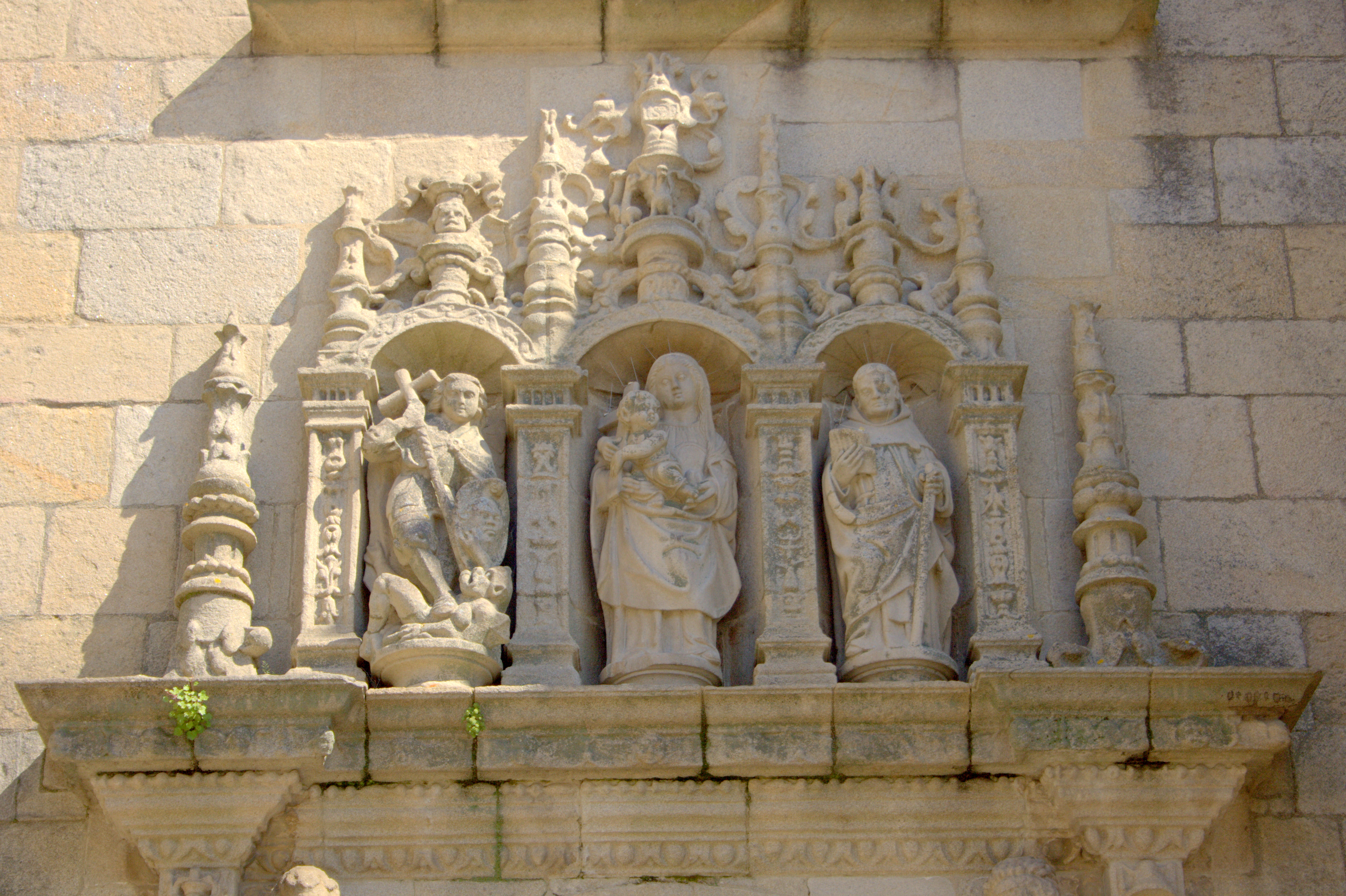
Detail of the external decoration

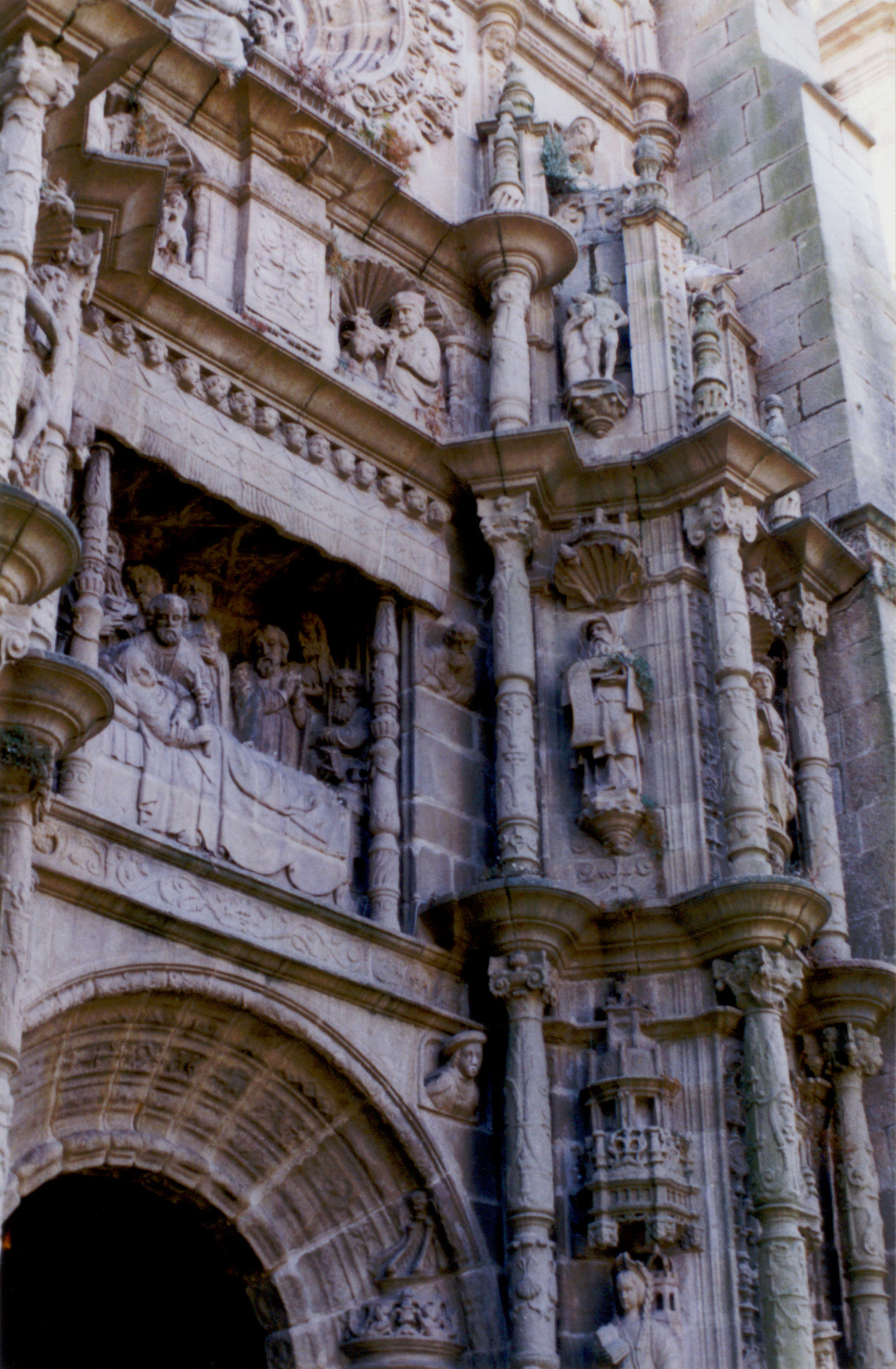
Detail of the main façade. Dormition of the Virgin

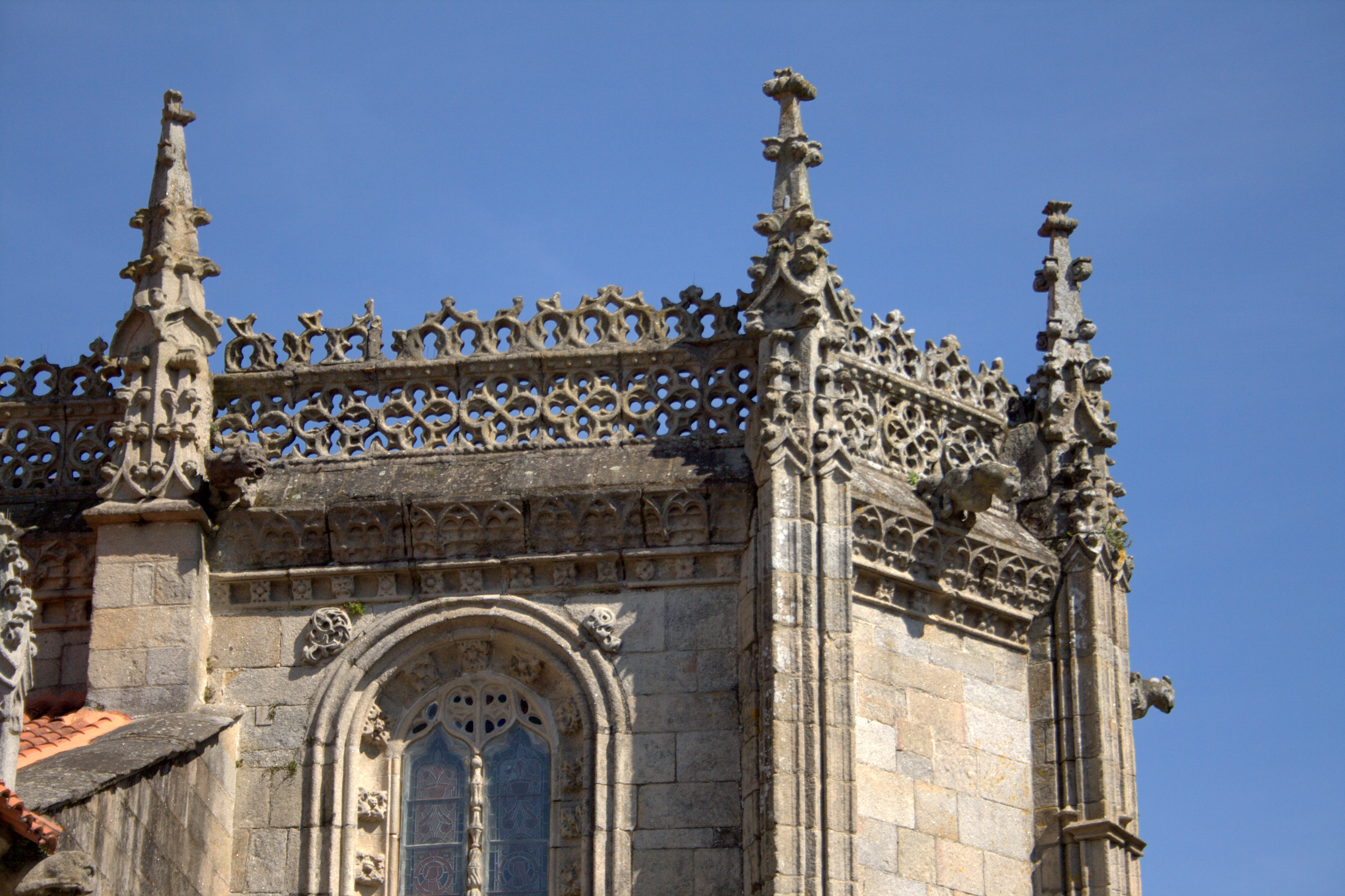
Detail of the stonework

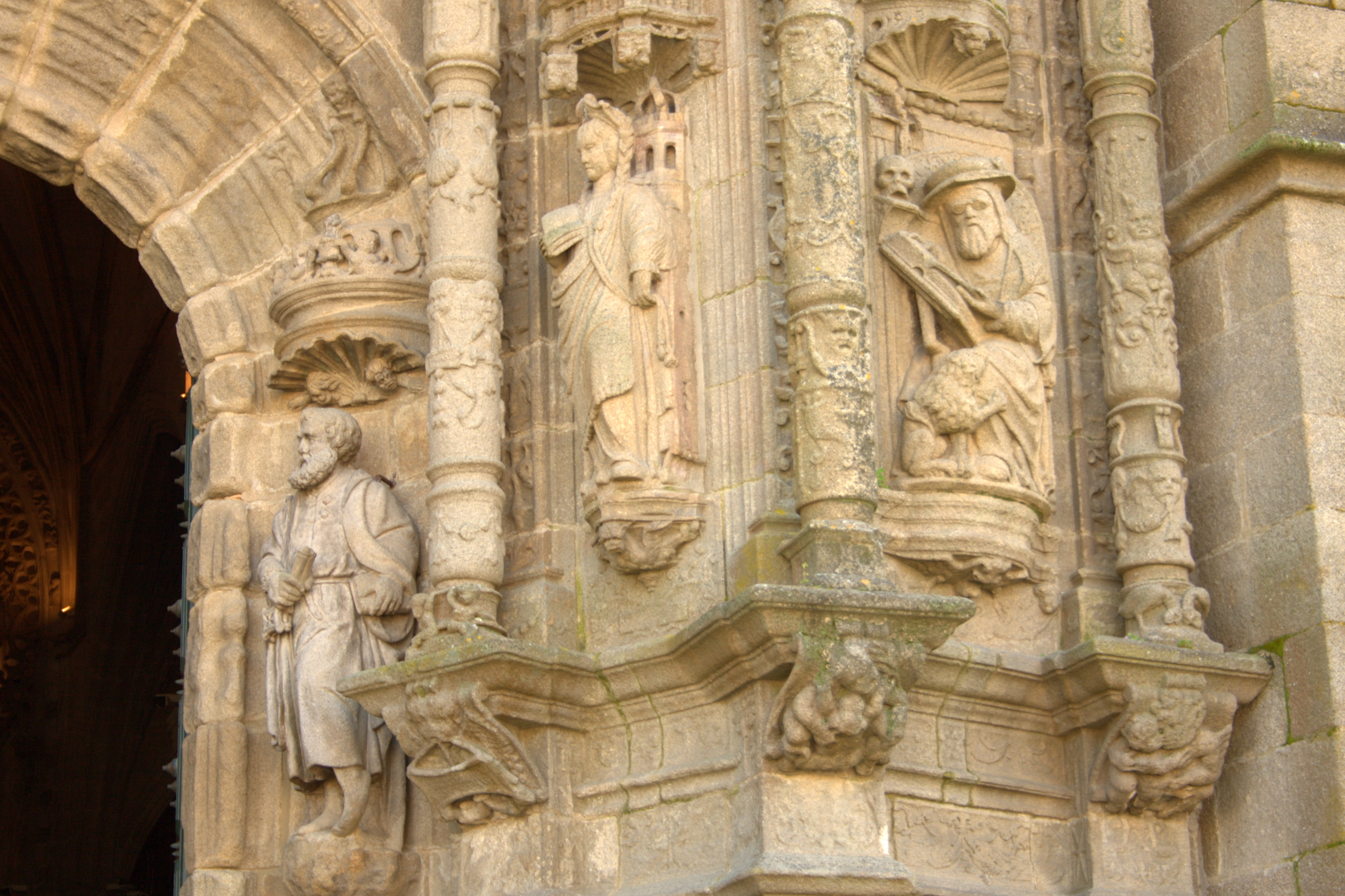
Detail of the main entrance

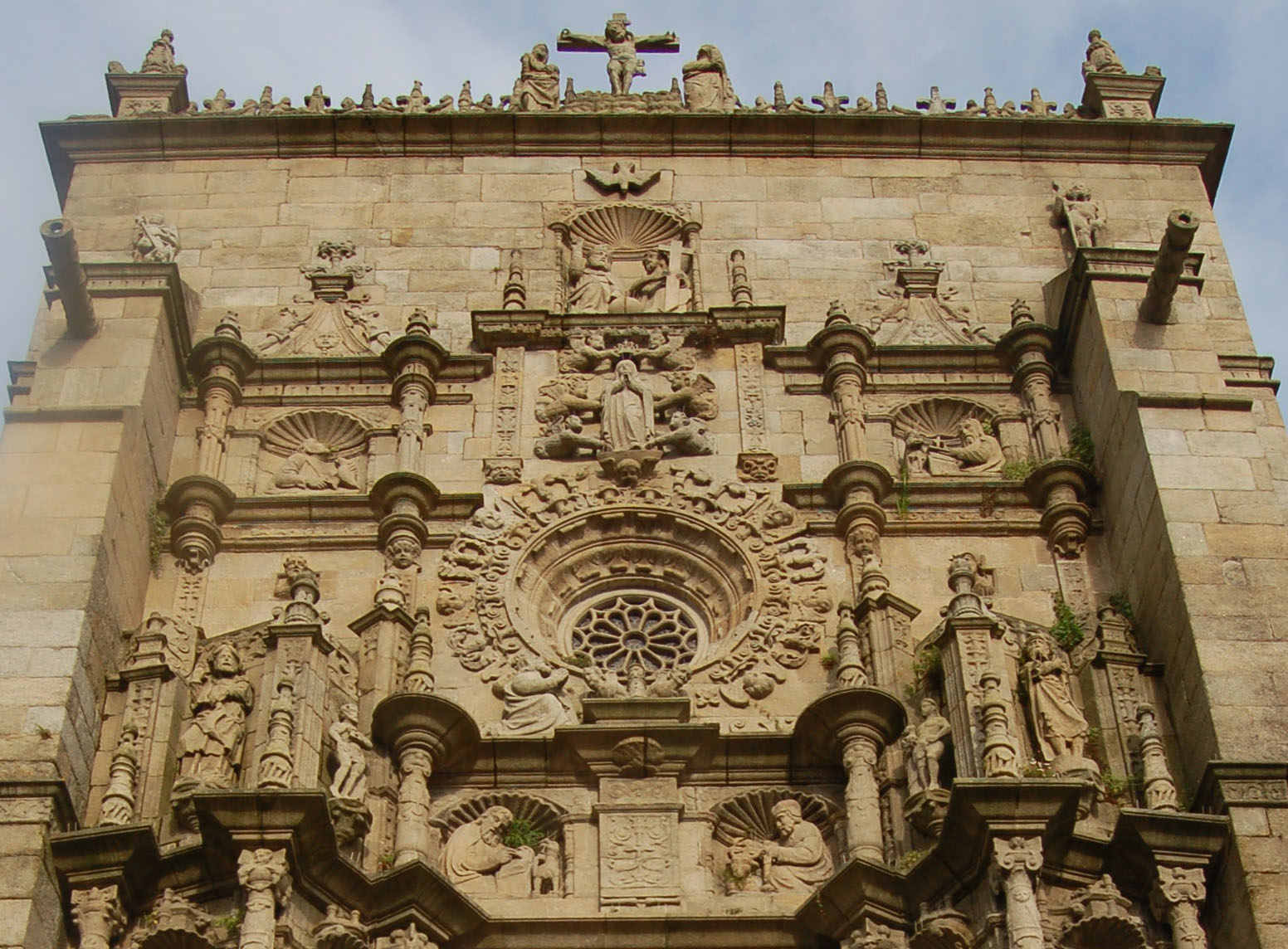
Detail of the upper decoration

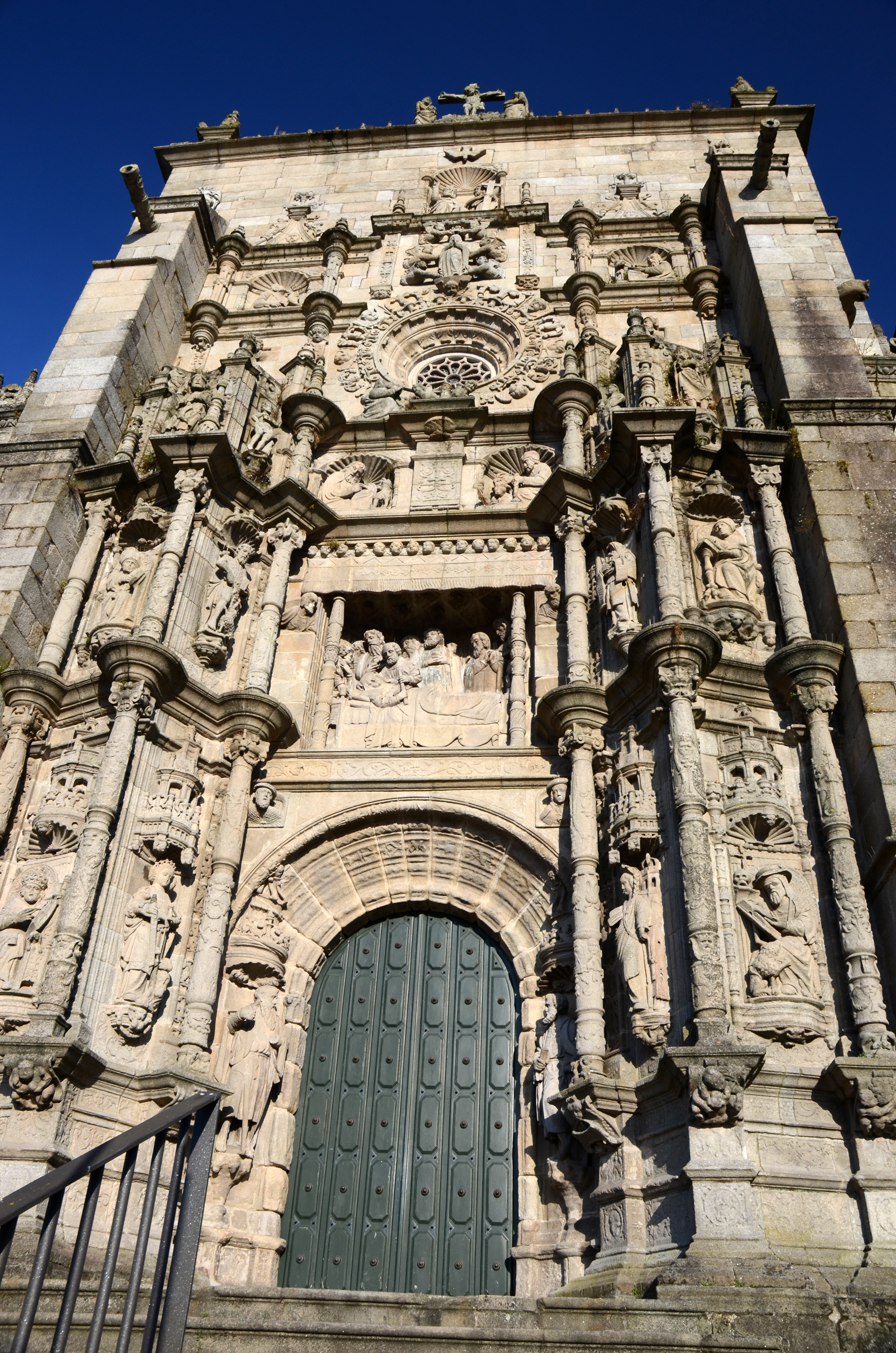
Portico

== Bibliography ==
- Santa María a maior de Pontevedra. Juan Juega Puig. Concello de Pontevedra, 2010.
- Iglesias gallegas de la Edad Media, colección de artículos publicados por José Villa-amil y Castro. Editorial de São Francisco de Sales. Madrid. 2005. ISBN 84-934081-5-8.
