= Church of the Gesù (disambiguation) =

The Church of the Gesù is the mother church of the Society of Jesus in Rome.

Church of the Gesù or Gesu Church may also refer to:

- Chiesa del Gesù, Alcamo in the province of Trapani, Italy
- Church of the Gesù, Ferrara in the province of Ferrara, Italy
- Church of the Gesù, Frascati in the province of Rome, Italy
- Church of the Gesù, Mirandola in the province of Modena, Italy
- Church of the Gesù, Palermo in Italy
- Church of the Gesù, Nice in France
- Church of the Gesú (Philadelphia) in Pennsylvania, United States
- Church of the Gesù (Philippines) of Ateneo de Manila University in Quezon City
- Church of the Gesù (Montreal) in Canada
- Gesu Church (Miami, Florida), Miami's oldest Catholic parish
- Gesu Church (Milwaukee, Wisconsin), a church located on Marquette University's campus
- Gesù Nuovo in Naples, Italy
- I Gesuiti, Venice in Italy
- San Silvestro, Viterbo, Italy, formerly known as Church of the Gesù

== See also ==
- Gesu (disambiguation)
- Jesuit Church (disambiguation)
- List of Jesuit sites
