= Jesuit Church =

There are many churches of the Roman Catholic Jesuit order, many of them patterned after Il Gesu in Rome and dedicated to Saint Ignatius. Nearly all have normal dedications to saints etc. but despite this some are usually known just as the Jesuit Church of the city, including:

The churches are ordered by its completion date.

- Church of the Gesù, Rome, Italy (1568-1580)
- Church of Gesù, Ferrara, Italy (1570)
- Jesuit Church, Valletta, Malta (1593-1609, rebuilt late 17th century after 1634 damage)
- Jesuit Church, Molsheim, France (1615-1617)
- Jesuit Church, Warsaw, Poland (1609-1626)
- Jesuit Church, Vienna, Austria (1623-1627, remodeled 1703-1705)
- Jesuit Church, Lviv, Ukraine (1610-1630)
- Jesuit Church, Bratislava, Slovakia (1636-1638)
- Jesuit Church, Cusco, Peru (1651-1669)
- Jesuit Church, Lucerne, Switzerland (1667-1677)
- Jesuit Church, Sibiu, Romania (1726-1733)
- Jesuit Church, Mannheim, Germany (1733-1756)
- Jesuit Chapel (Quebec City), Canada (1818-1820, expanded 1857, new facade 1930)

== See also ==
- List of Jesuit sites
- Church of the Gesù (disambiguation)
