= St. Bartholomew's Church, Pontevedra =

Baroque church in Pontevedra, Spain

St. Bartholomew's Church
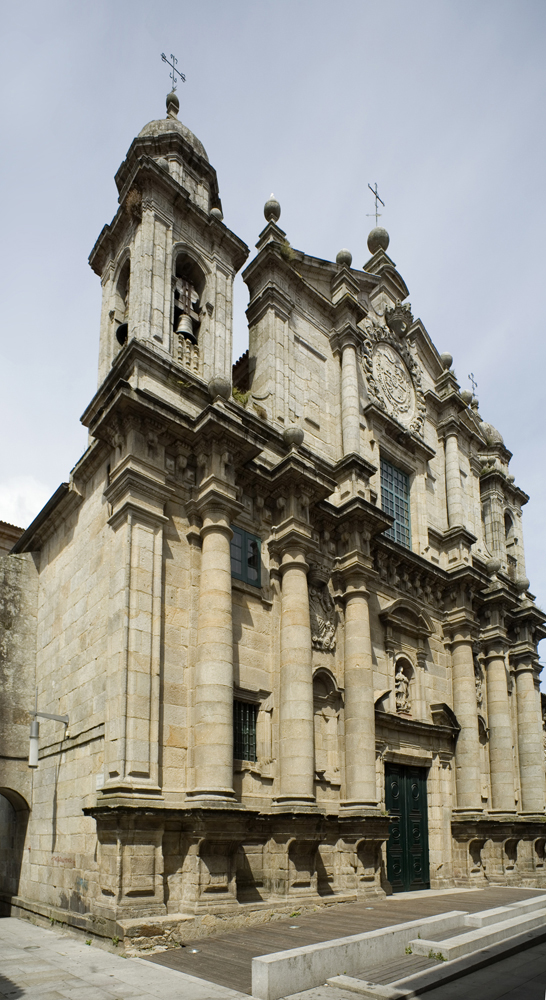
- Façade of the church
- St. Bartholomew's Church
- 42°25′59.16″N 8°38′33.0″W
- Location: Pontevedra, Galicia
- Country: Spain
- Denomination: Catholic Church

History
- Dedication: Bartholomew the Apostle
- Consecrated: 1714

Architecture
- Groundbreaking: 1714
- Completed: 1695

Administration
- Archdiocese: Santiago de Compostela

St. Bartholomew's Church (Galician: Igrexa de San Bartolomeu; Spanish: Iglesia de San Bartolomé) is a Catholic religious building in the city of Pontevedra, Galicia, Spain. The church was built in the late 17th century in the Baroque style as a place of worship and pastoral activities for the adjoining Jesuit college. The church was dedicated to Saint Bartholomew when it became a parish church in 1836.

== Location ==
The building is located in Sarmiento Street, near the old St. Clare's Gate, or Rocheforte of the old city walls. The adjoining College of the Society of Jesus is now part of the city's museum complex, the Pontevedra Museum.

== History ==
The church was built between 1695 and 1714 by the Jesuits according to the plans of their mother church —Church of the Gesù— in Rome. As part of the Jesuit college complex, it was used for pastoral and spiritual activities for the students of the college that the Jesuits ran in the city between 1650 and 1767, the year of their expulsion from Spain. It was consecrated and opened for worship on 14 July 1714.

The site for the construction of the church was chosen in 1685. Pedro Monteagudo designed it, based on the model of the Church of the Gesù in Rome. The church survived the Lisbon earthquake of 1755, but buttresses were added on the left side to secure it and strengthen the foundations.

The church was converted into a parish church in 1836, replacing and taking the name of the former church of Saint Bartholomew the Elder, which occupied the site where the Principal Theatre of Pontevedra is today.

== Description ==
This new church of St. Bartholomew is a large, solemn building and one of the few existing examples in Galicia of Italian Baroque architecture, which is very different from the Galician Baroque. With this church, the so-called International Baroque was introduced to Galicia.

The church has a Latin cross shape and is set in a rectangle. It consists of three naves with three sections and a transept with a main chapel between two sacristies. It is reminiscent of Italian churches dedicated to the 'Name of Jesus' such as the Church of the Gesù in Ferrara, the Gesù in Lecce or the Church of the Gesuiti in Venice, among others. The side naves are covered with cross vaults in sections and the main nave with a barrel vault. The dome stands on Pendentives. Inside, there are important sculptures from the Valladolid school, such as the Penitent Magdalene, from the Baroque school of Santiago de Compostela (by Silveira and Gambino) and sculptures by Pedro de Mena.

In an altar inside the church there is a statue of the Virgen de la O (Pregnant Virgin), patron saint of the city of Pontevedra.

On its façade, the six large Doric columns, the bell towers and the upper pediment are characteristic of Jesuit Baroque. There is also the coat of arms of the Pimentel family, on the upper part of the school's entrance door a large stone coat of arms of Spain and in the centre, a sculpture of the Virgin Mary in a niche.

== Gallery ==
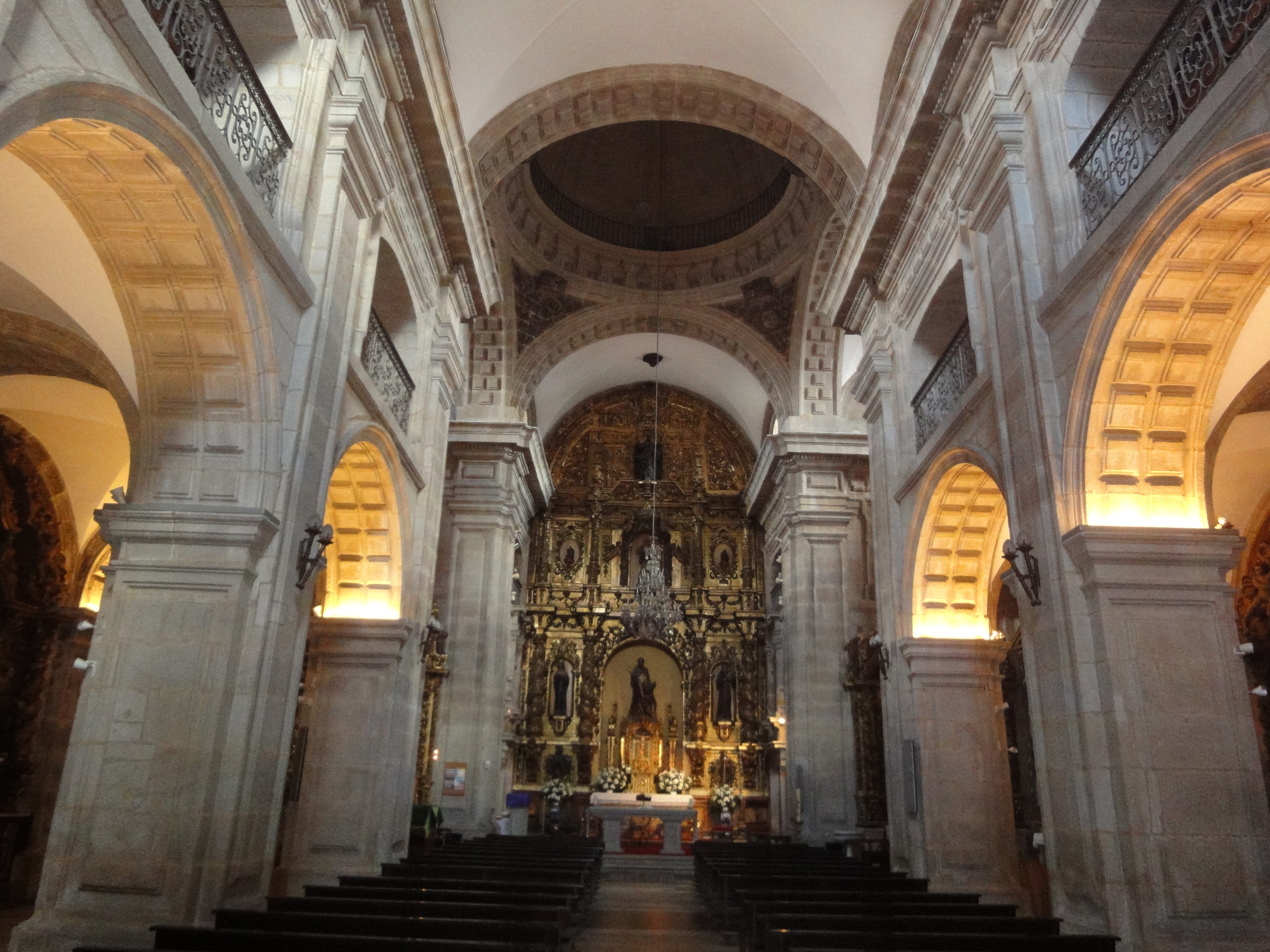
Central nave of the church

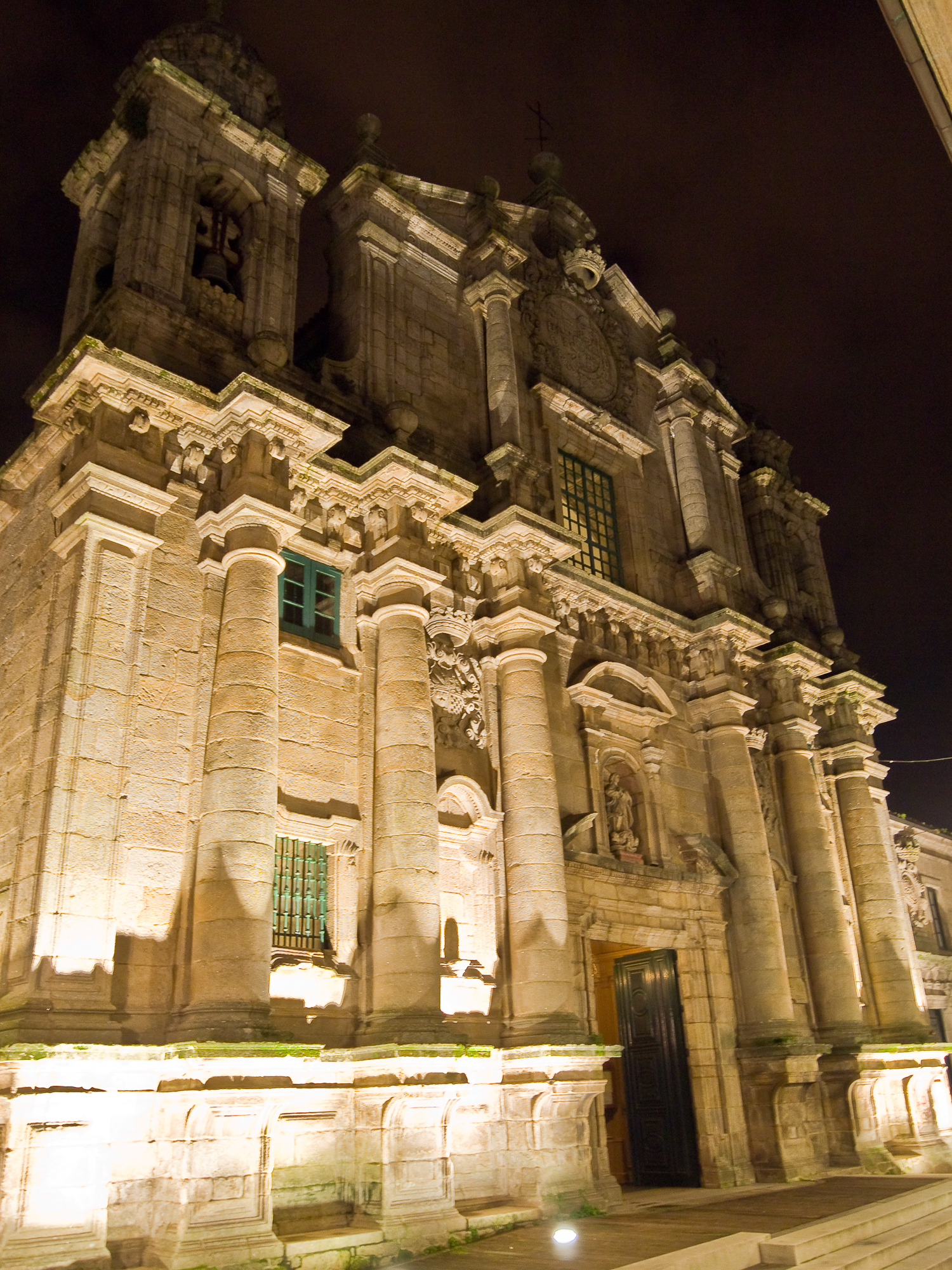
The church (by night)

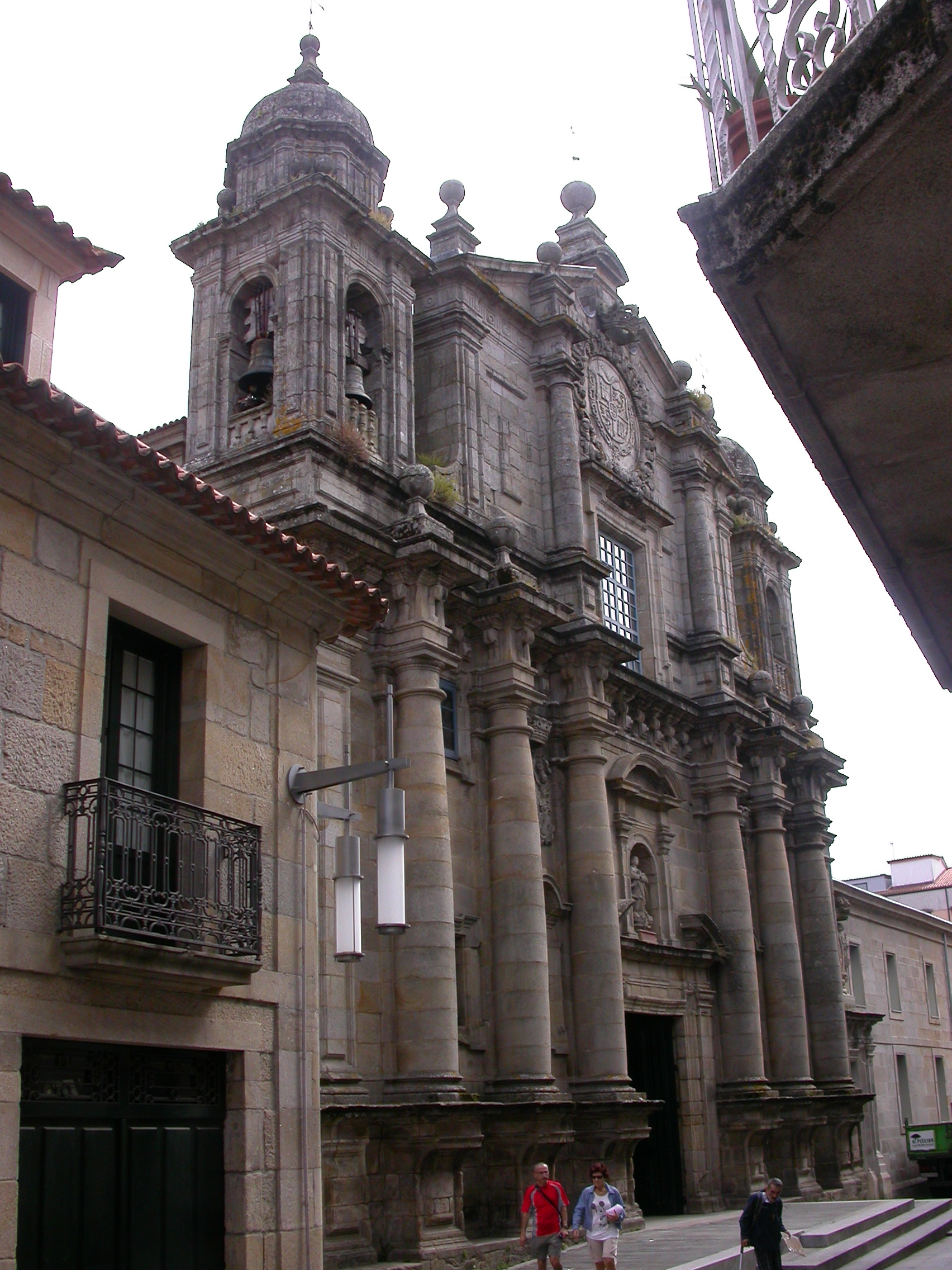
St Bartholomew's church

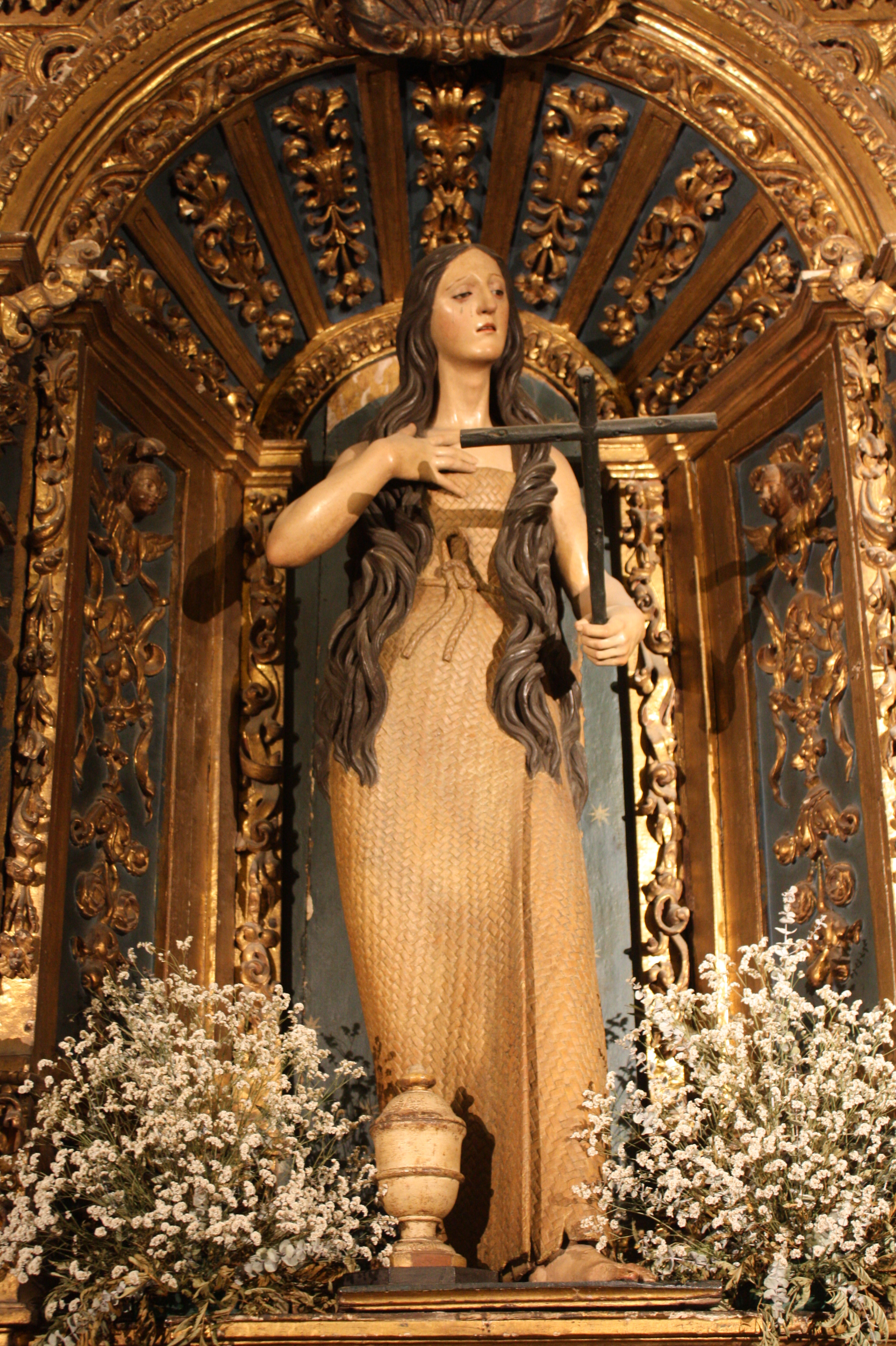
The Penitent Magdalene

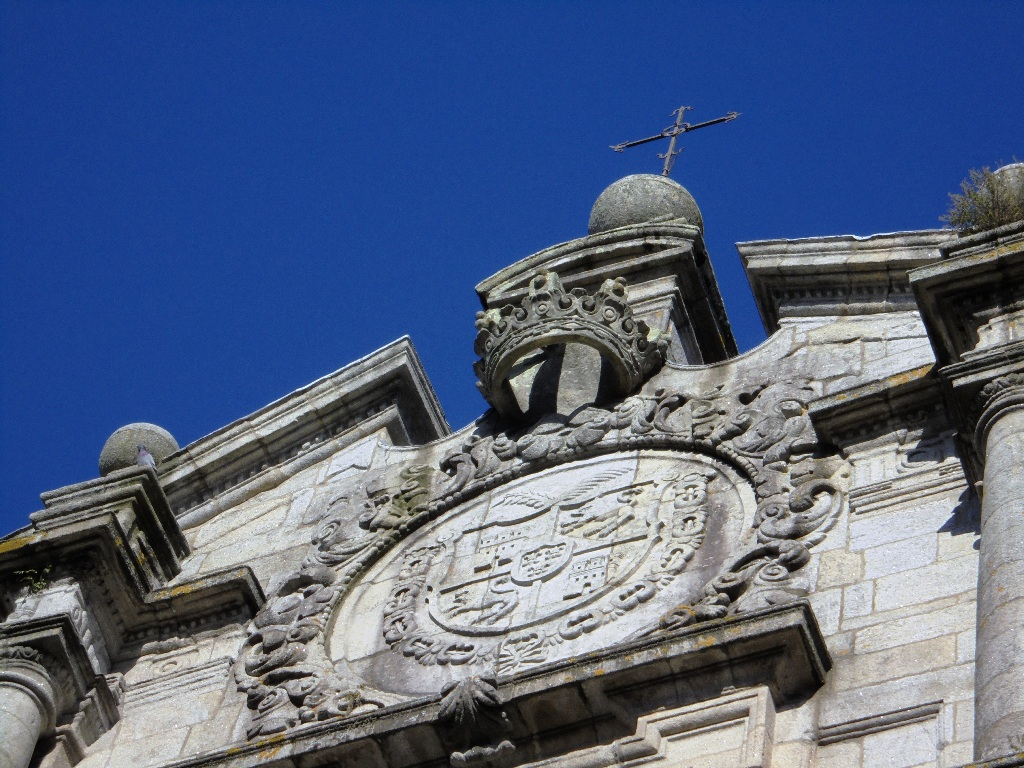
Spanish coat of arms at the top of the façade

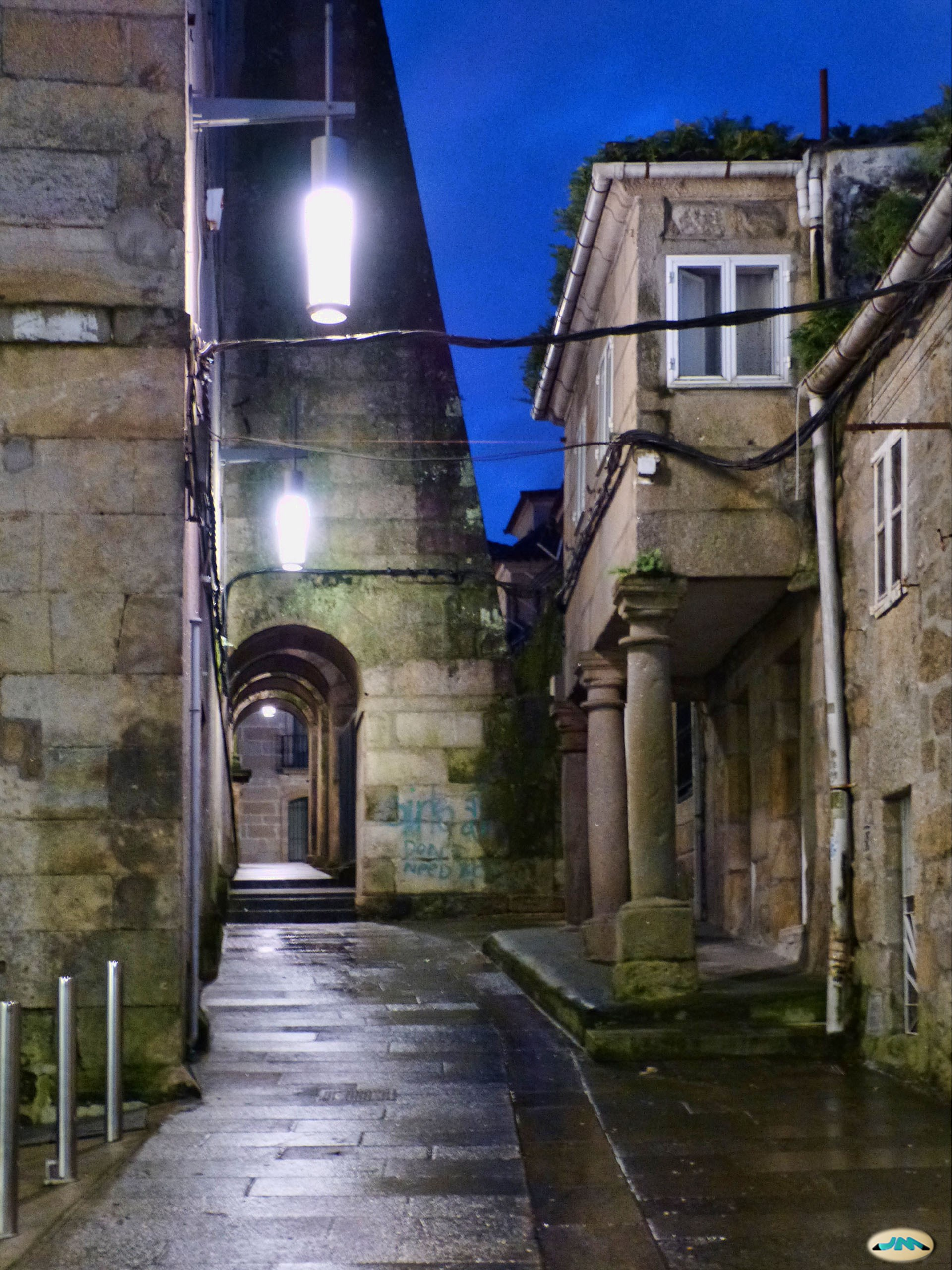
Buttresses supporting the left side of the building

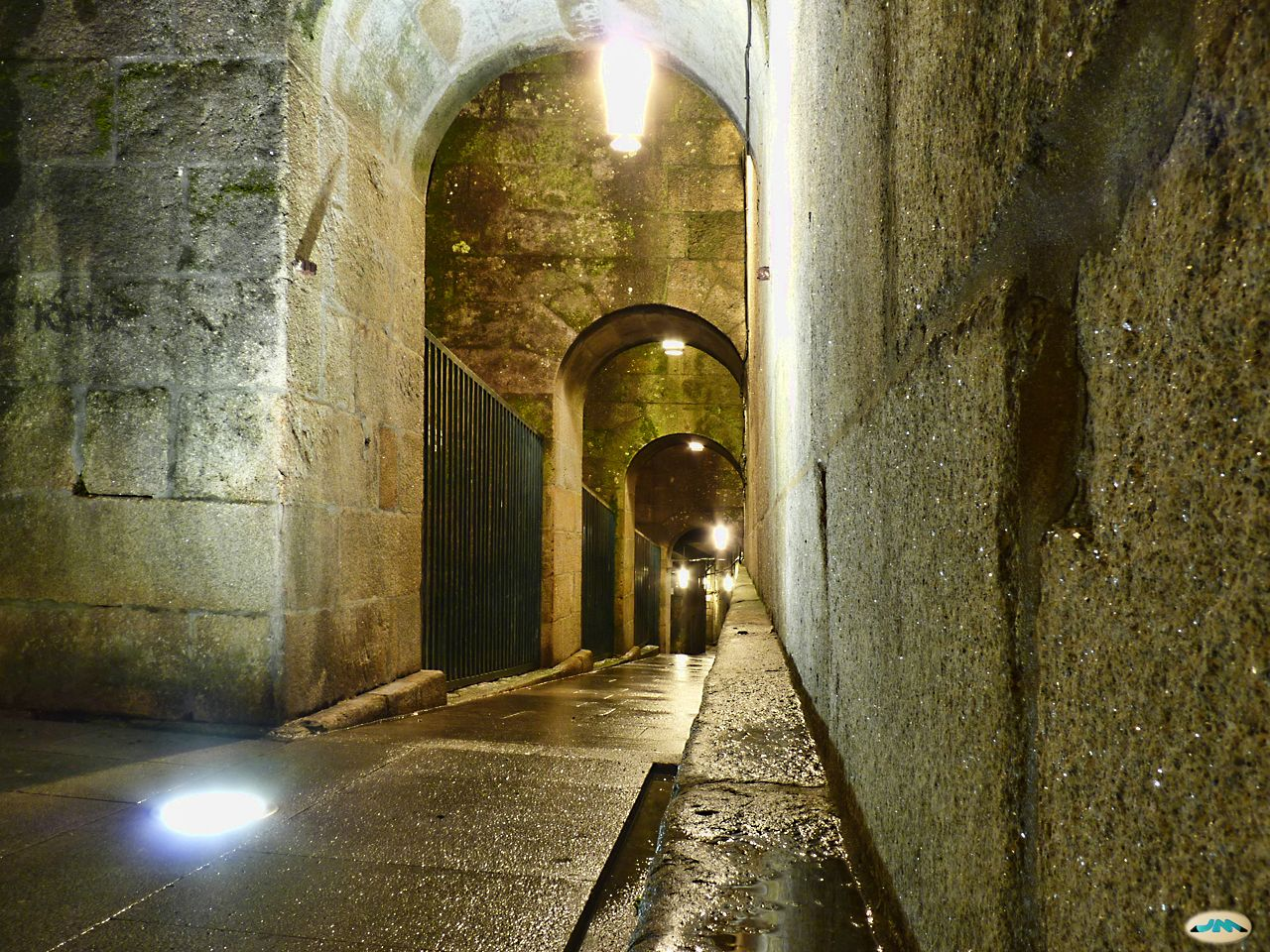
Passage under the buttresses

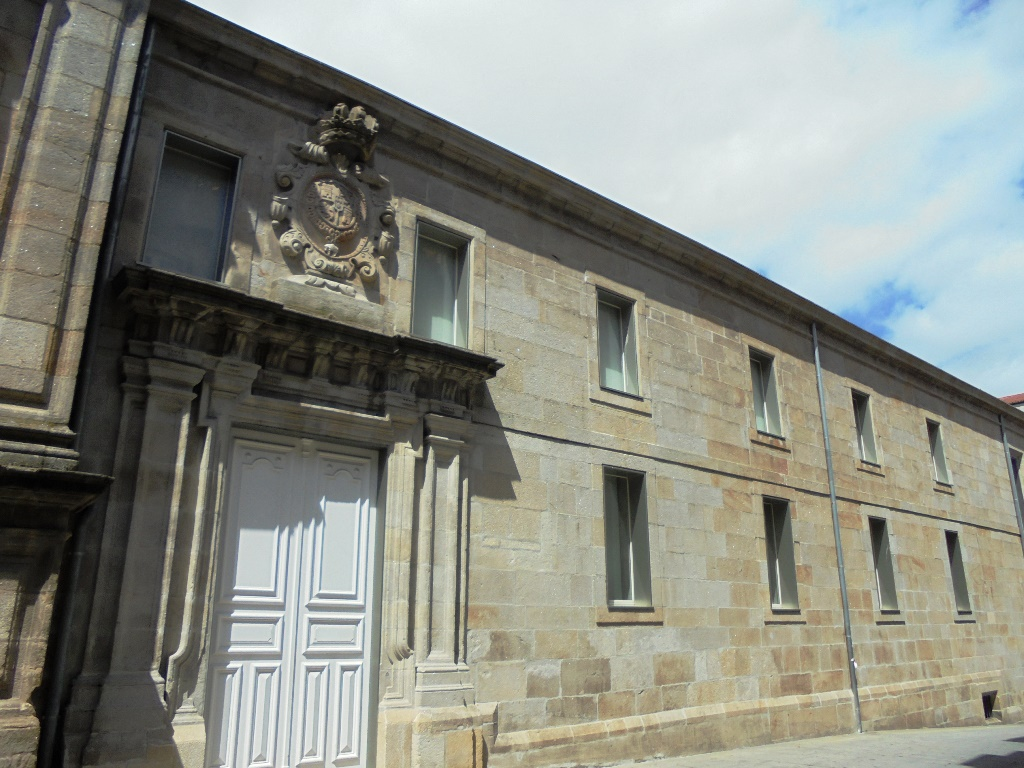
The College of the Society of Jesus

== See also ==
- Catholic Church in Spain
- Society of Jesus
