= Gesù =

Gesù, Ġesù or Gesu may refer to:

- Church of the Gesù, the mother church of the Society of Jesus
  - Church of the Gesù (disambiguation), other churches with the name
- Jesus in the Italian or Maltese languages
- Gesù Nuovo, a church and square in Naples, Italy
- Guarneri del Gesù, an Italian luthier from Cremona

== See also ==
- Gesu School, a diverse Catholic elementary school
