= Calle Sarmiento =

Medieval street in Pontevedra, Spain

Sarmiento Street
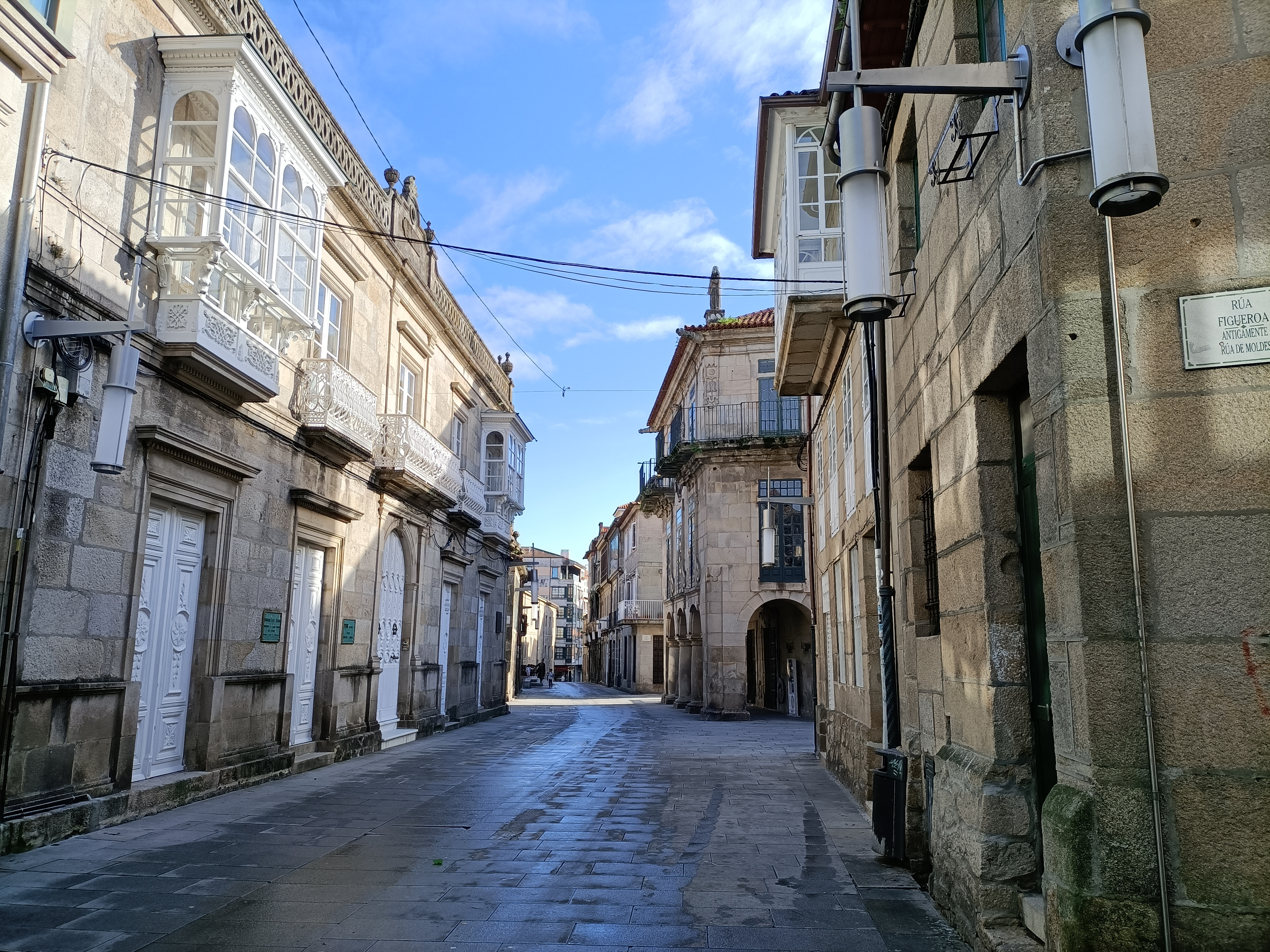
- Sarmiento Street in 2023
- Native name: Calle Sarmiento (Spanish)
- Type: street
- Maintained by: Pontevedra City Council
- Location: Pontevedra, Spain
- Postal code: 36002
- Coordinates: 42.432861°N 8.643056°W

Calle Sarmiento is a street in the Spanish city of Pontevedra, located in the city's historic centre.

== Origin of the name ==
The street is named after Martín Sarmiento (1695-1772), a writer and scholar who spent his childhood and part of his youth in Pontevedra. Father Sarmiento was educated in the former Jesuit school on the street that bears his name.

== History ==
Sarmiento Street is one of the oldest streets in Pontevedra, documented as early as 1437 in the Concello Vello book. It formed the main axis of Pontevedra's old town, along with Isabel II Street, around which other secondary streets were laid out, forming a classic example of a medieval town with a fishbone-like plan.

In the Middle Ages, the section of the street running from the García Flórez pazo to Gregorio Fernández Street was known as Nuño Fatel Street, and formed part of the last extension of the city walls built in the 15th century. The other part of the street was known as Feria Street. Travellers from Castile entered the walled enclosure via Sarmiento Street.

In 1561, part of the street still bore the name Nuño Fatel, which disappeared in the following century, having become part of the generic name Feria Vieja (Old Market), the name by which the Verdura square was identified.

Since 1653, the street has been known as Company Street, due to the construction of the Jesuit College at its end and the settlement of the Jesuits there. In 1854, the street was permanently renamed rue Sarmiento.

== Description ==
Sarmiento Street follows a west–east axis and is located between Real Street and the junction of Cobián Roffignac and Padre Amoedo streets. It runs along the north side of Méndez Núñez and Verdura squares.

This is a 290-metre-long cobbled pedestrian street, with a slightly winding route and a gentle slope towards the centre of the street, in the heart of Pontevedra's Old Town. Streets such as Don Gonzalo, César Boente and Pasantería converge here. Its average width is 3.60 metres.

This is the most important cross street from west to east in the old town, along with Isabel II Street. Here can be found various commercial establishments, hotels and buildings such as the Saint Bartholomew's Church, the College of the Society of Jesus, the Pazo García Flórez belonging to the Pontevedra Museum and Bernardo López Abadín's eclectic 19th-century mansion on the site of the former home of the Bermúdez de Castro family, known as the House of Mercy.

== Outstanding buildings ==
The Baroque church of Saint Bartholomew, built between 1695 and 1714 by the Society of Jesus according to the plans of the Gesù church in Rome, stands in Sarmiento Street. It was the church of the Jesuit college in the city between 1650 and 1767. It is one of the rare examples of Italian Baroque architecture to be found in Galicia, where international Baroque was introduced. On its façade, the six large Doric columns, towers and upper pediment are characteristic of Jesuit Baroque. It also bears the coat of arms of the Pimentel family and, at the top, a large stone coat of arms of the Crown of Castile.

Next to the church of San Bartholomew is the Jesuit College, also in the Baroque style. On the outside, the two-storey building has a long, sober granite façade with numerous symmetrical windows, to which the part closest to Cobián Roffignac Street was added later. The lintelled door at the corner near the church is remarkable. It is decorated with plaques and pilasters and surmounted by a large coat of arms of Spain carved in stone in a medallion.

The Pazo García Flórez is an 18th-century Baroque pazo located between Sarmiento street and the Leña square. The main façade, facing Sarmiento Street, features a portico with three arches on large columns. On the first floor there are three doors, surrounded by volutes on the lower part, and on the second floor there are two doors with balconies that extend to the adjacent façades, between which is a large stone coat of arms crowned by a great helm, originally gilded and polychrome, surrounded by five medallions. Inside the coat of arms, the lineages of the Estévez, Suárez, Fariña and Flórez families are represented. There are two gargoyles in the corners of the upper part of the façade.

Bernardo López Abadín's 19th-century French eclectic mansion is located at number 43. Many decorative elements were imported from Paris, such as the interior woodwork, printed glass, plasterwork and ironwork. The palace was designed by the architect Ricardo de Arístegui in 1870 and financed by Manuel Durán. On the outside, the facade galleries, the upper cornice with circular motifs and the chimney stand out. Inside, the vestibule leads to a staircase illuminated by a pyramidal skylight and preceded by a cast-iron lattice door. Queen Victoria Eugenie of Battenberg slept in one of the canopy beds in the mansion during a visit to Pontevedra.

On the west side of the street, the house at number 8 dates back to the 17th century and features a coat of arms of the Moscoso and Mendoza families on the façade of the upper floor.

== Gallery ==
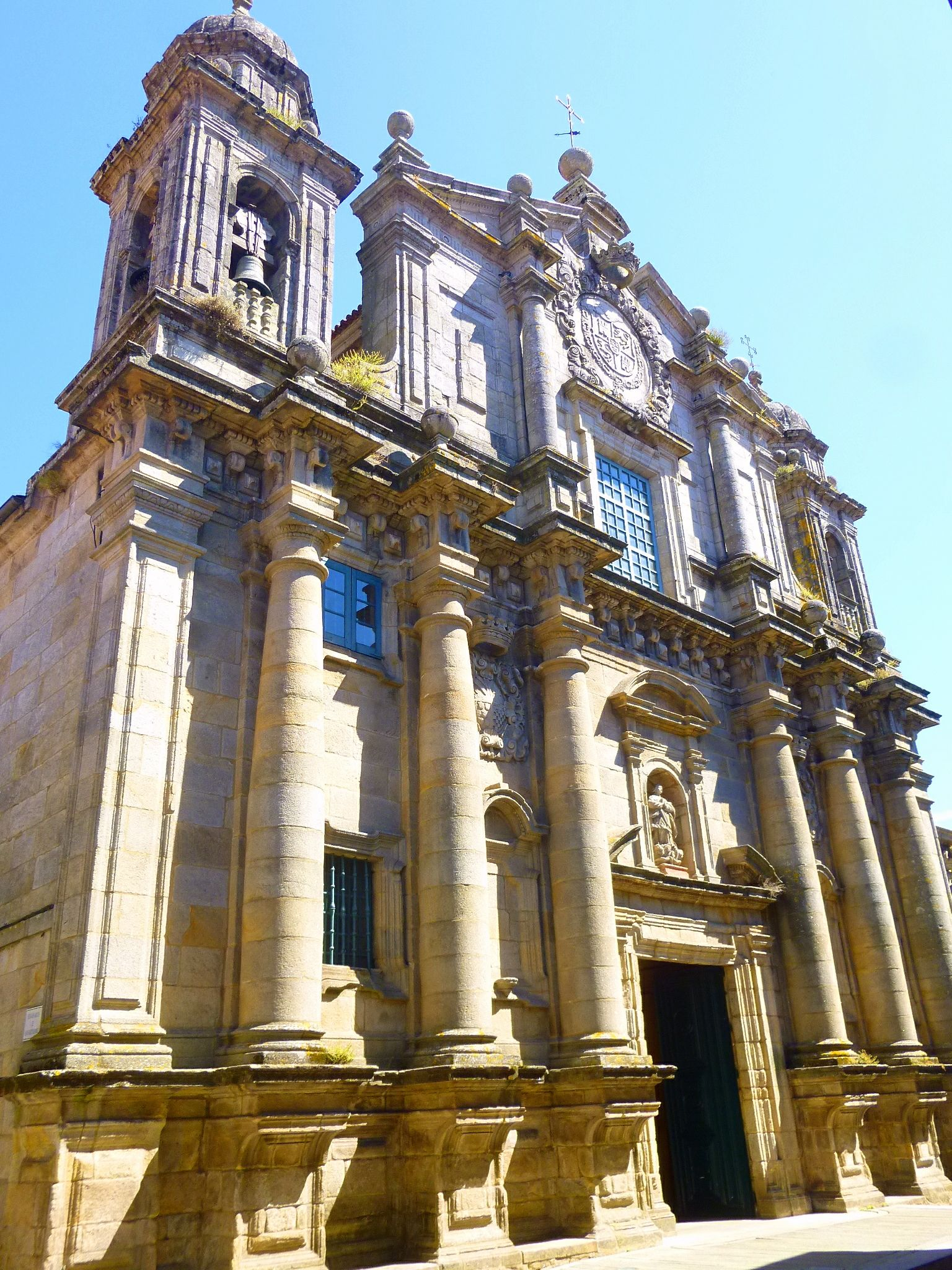
Saint Bartholomew's church

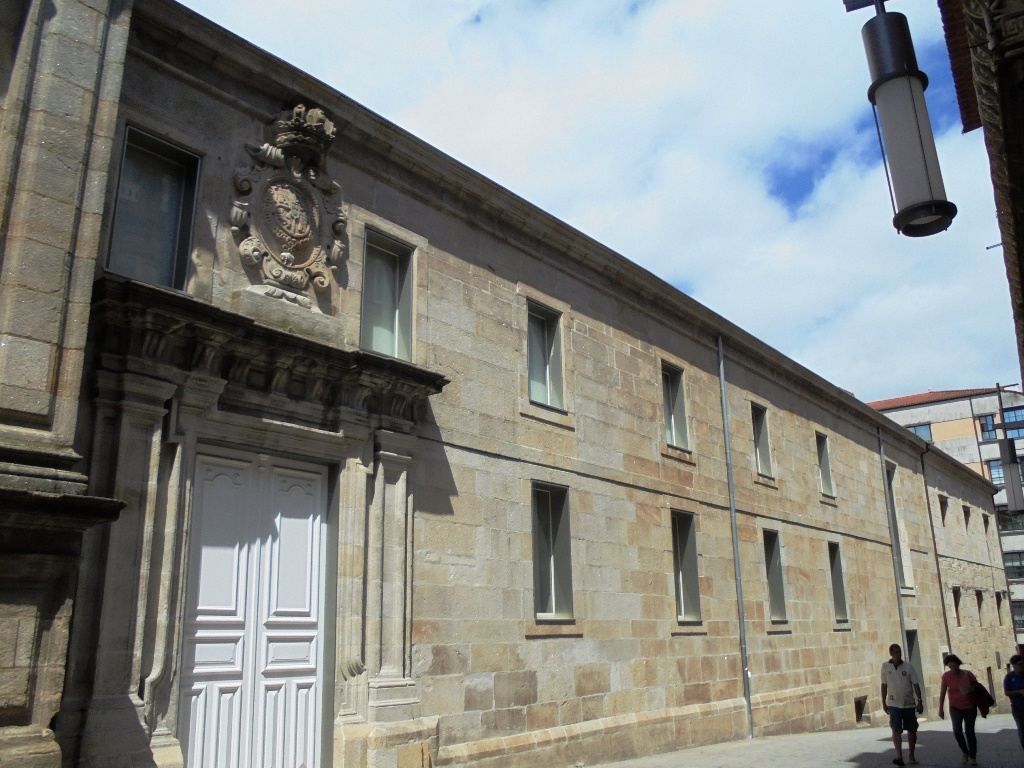
College of the Jesuits

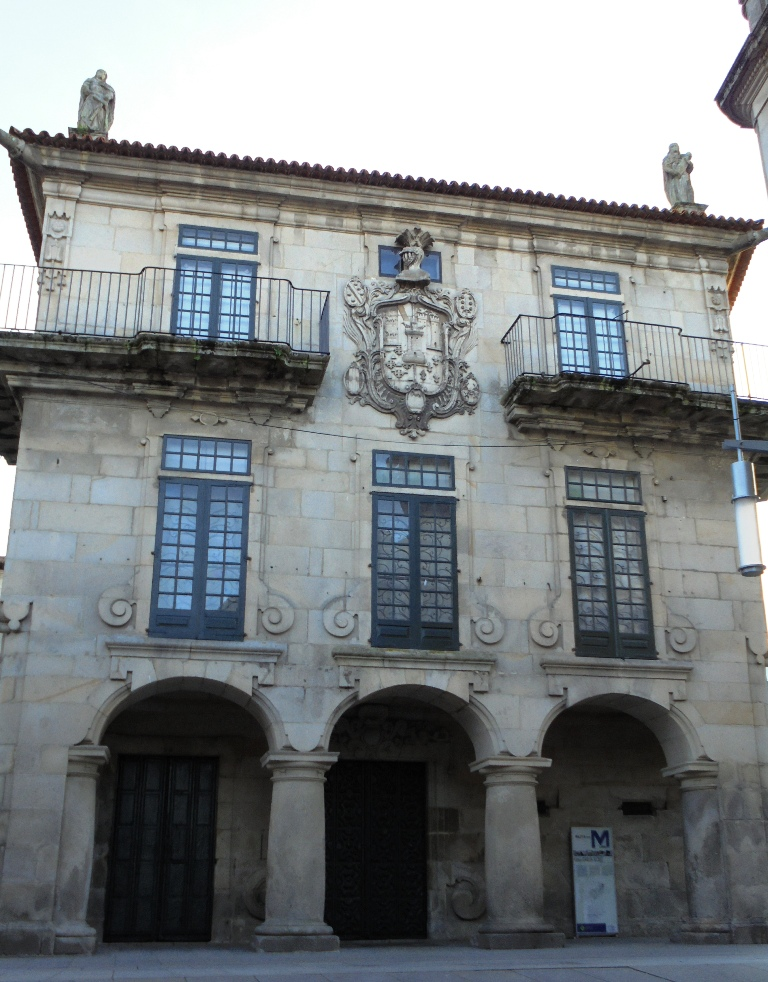
Pazo de García Flórez

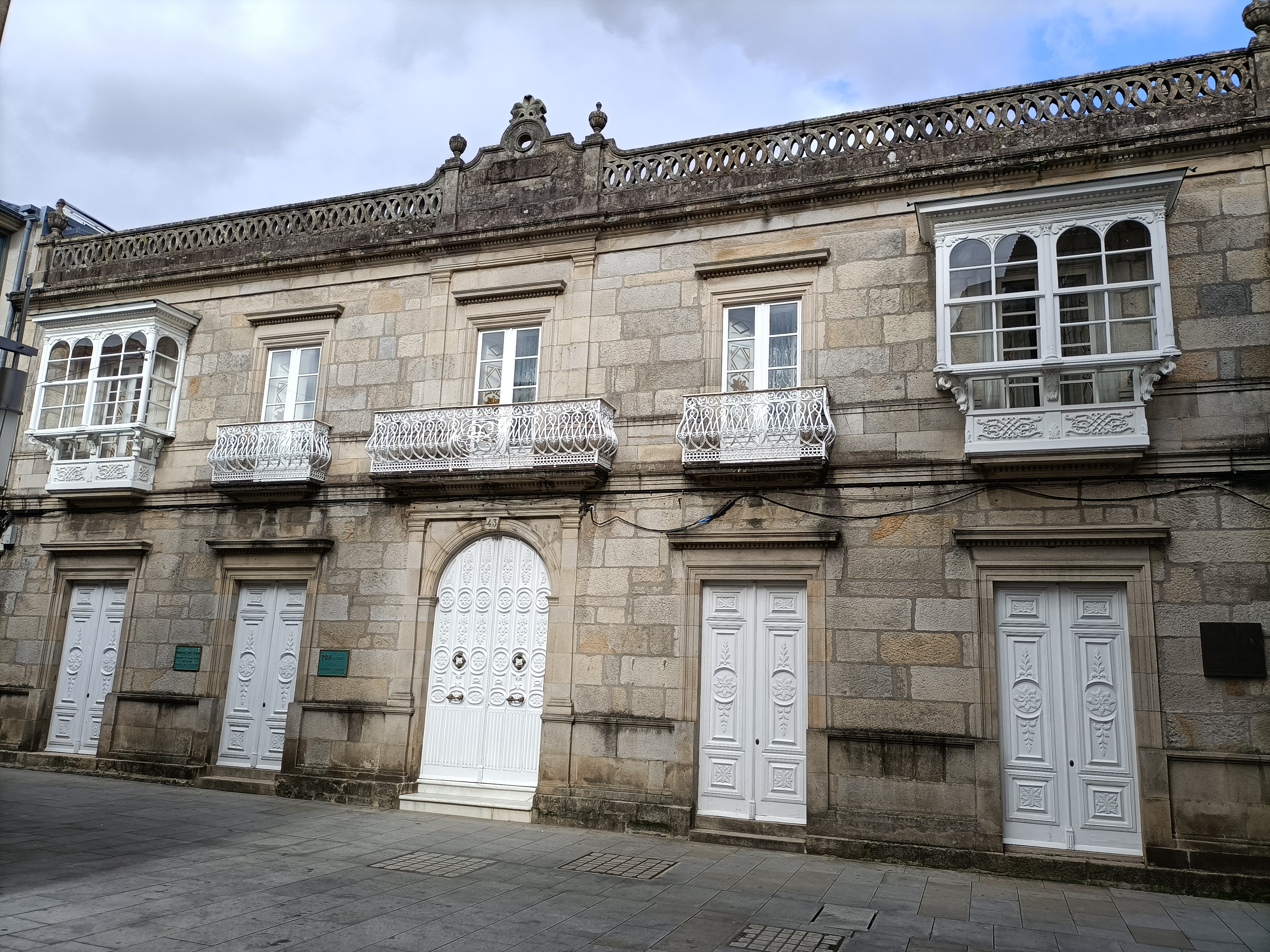
Bernardo López Abadín Mansion

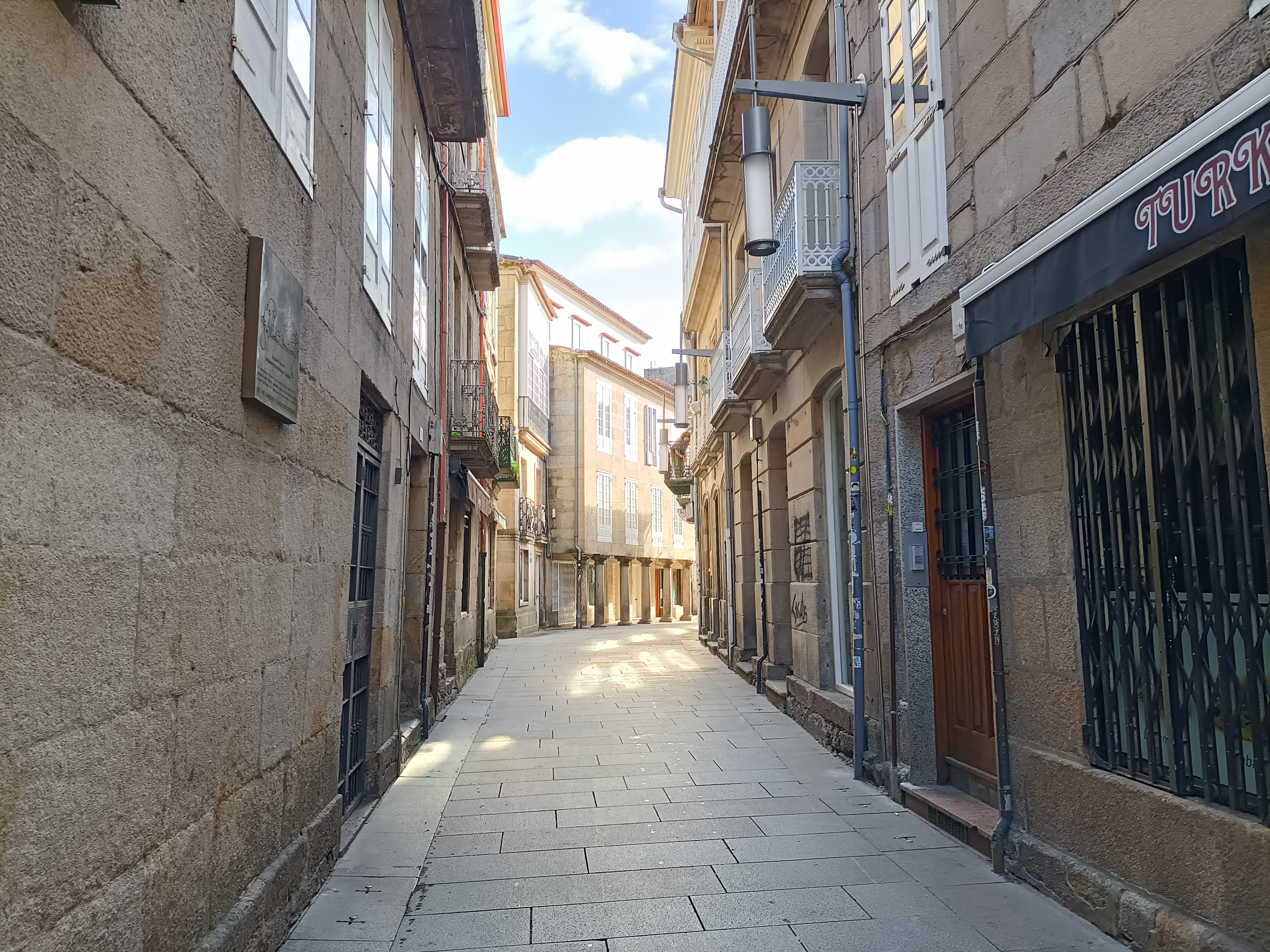
First stretch of Sarmiento Street

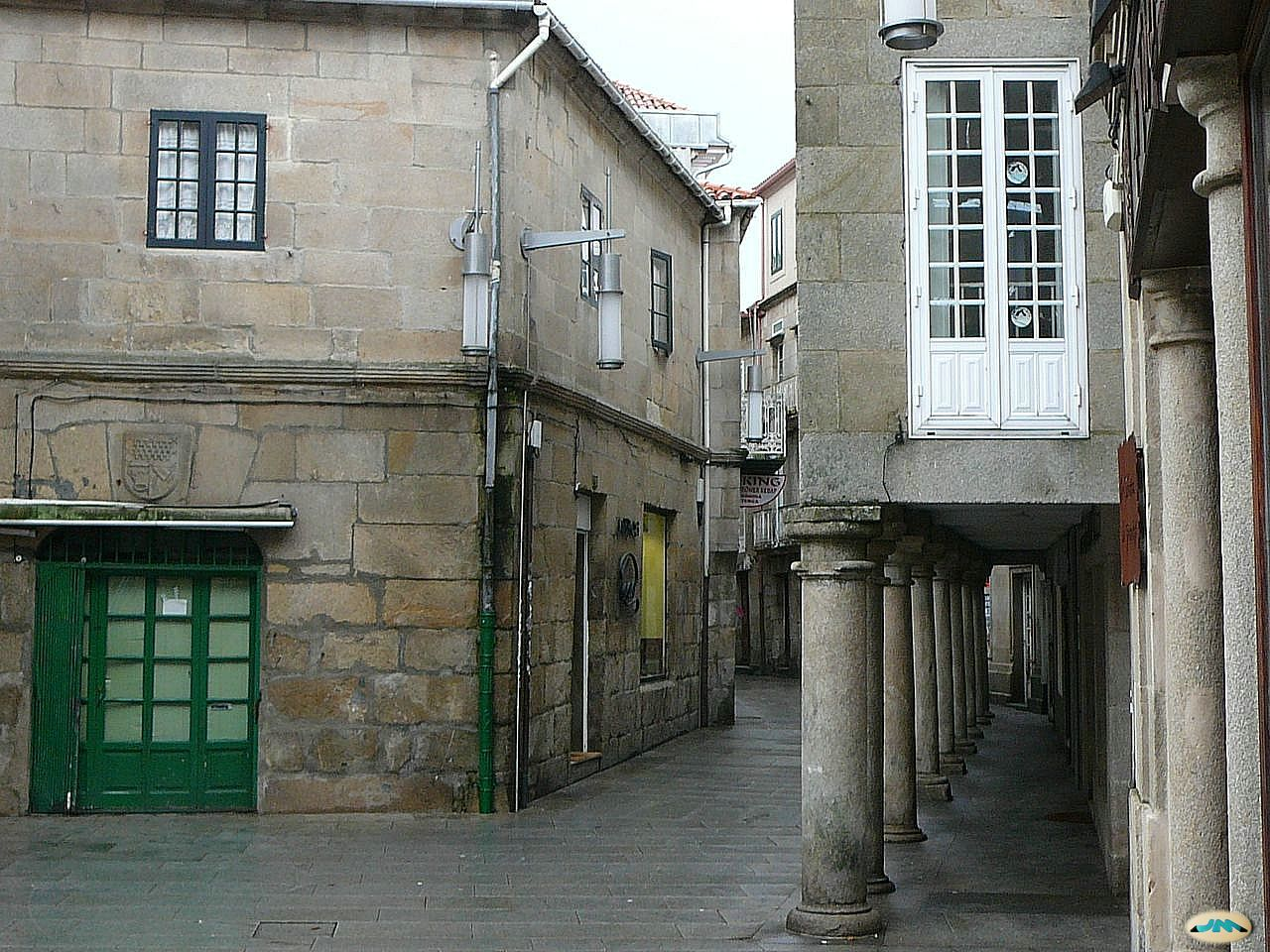
Western end of the street with arcades

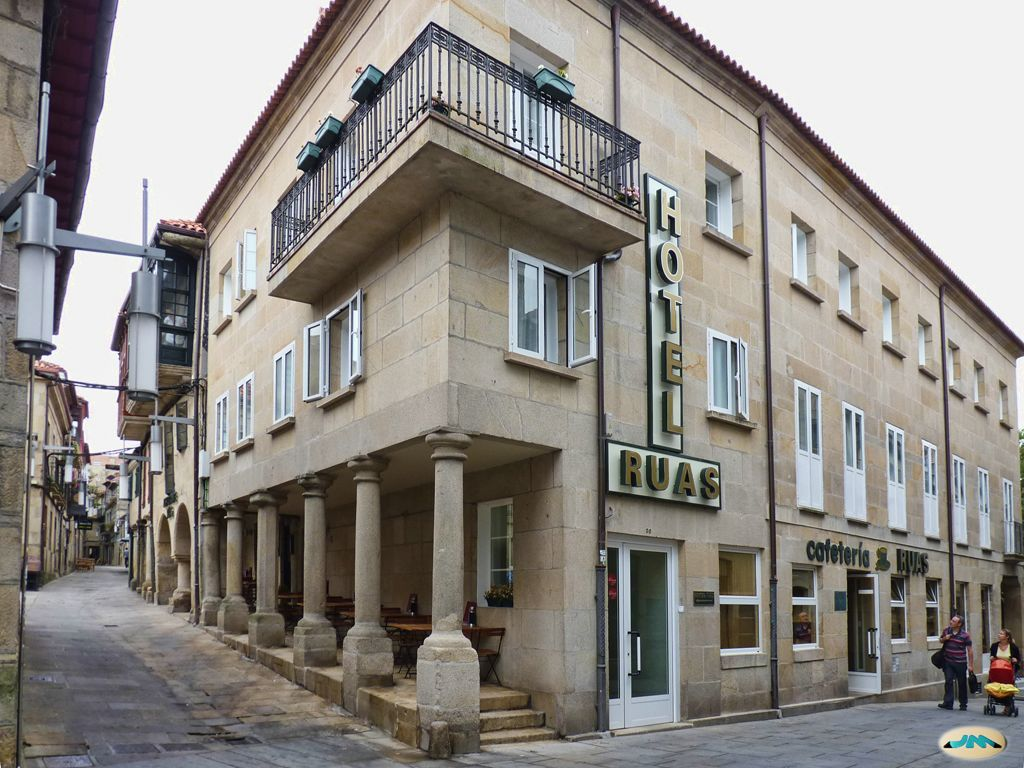
Rúas Hotel in Sarmiento Street

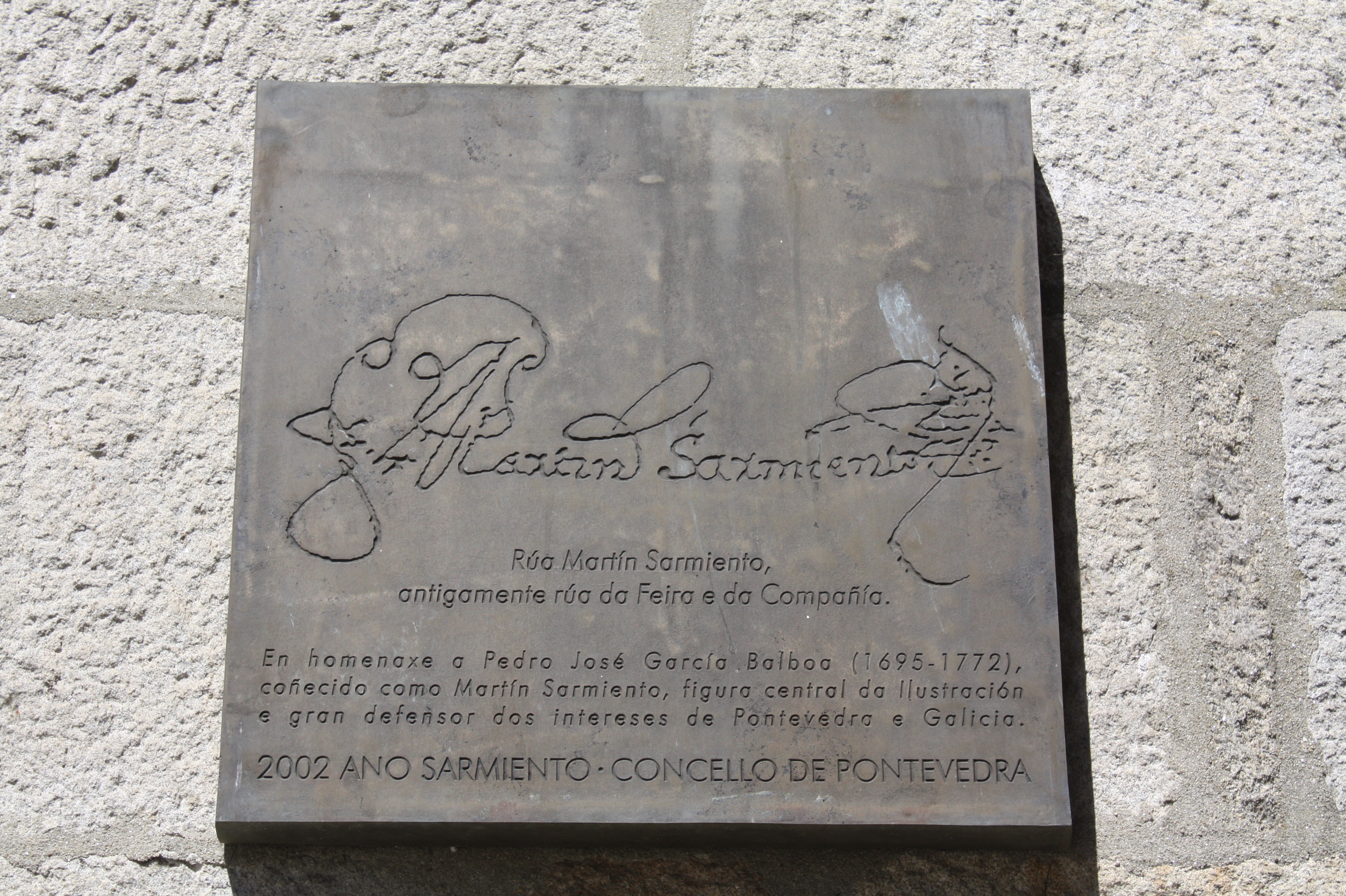
Plaque in tribute to Martín Sarmiento in the street that bears his name

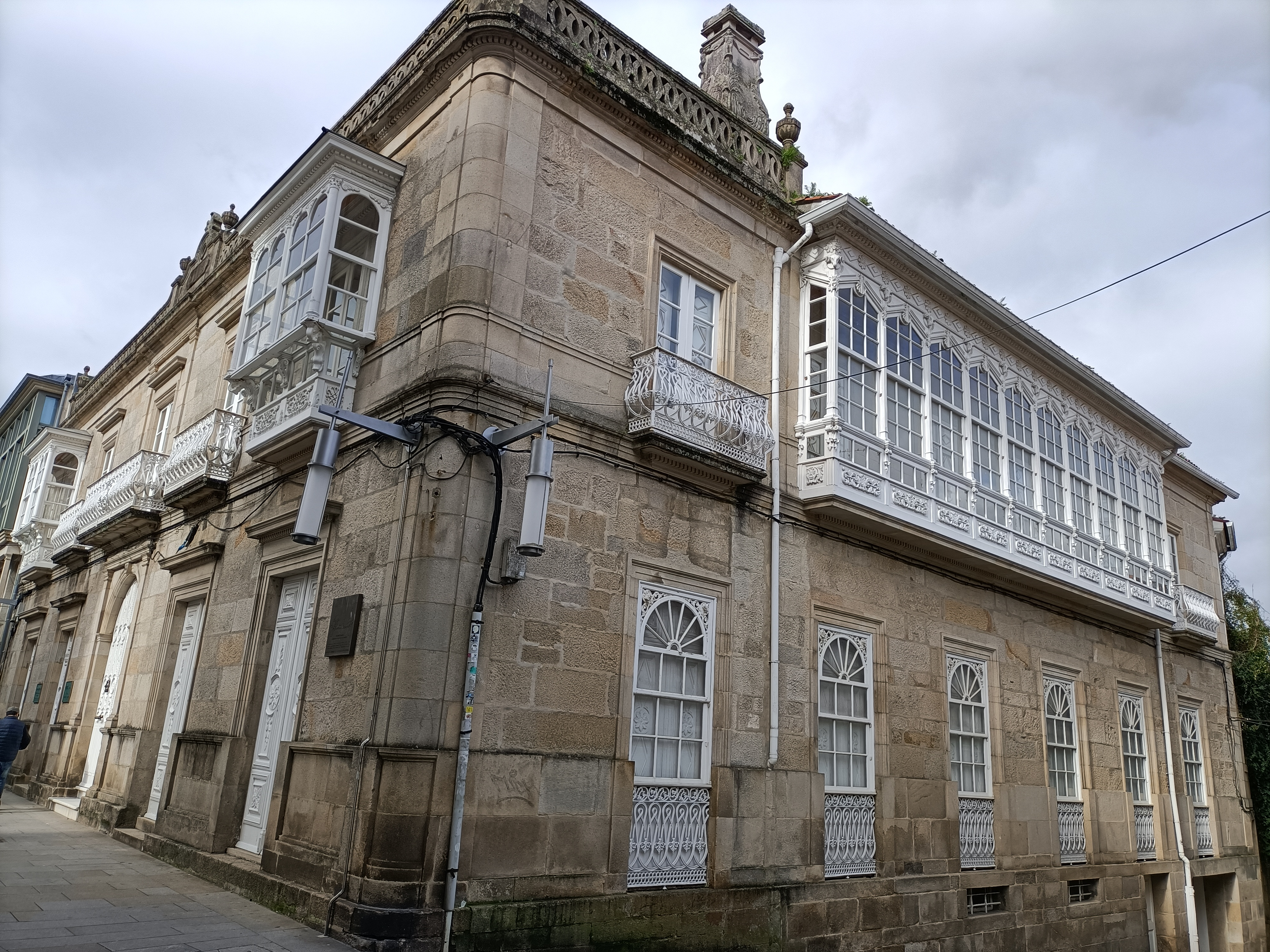
Side facade of the Bernardo López mansion, dating from the 19th century, with its emblematic chimney and galleries.

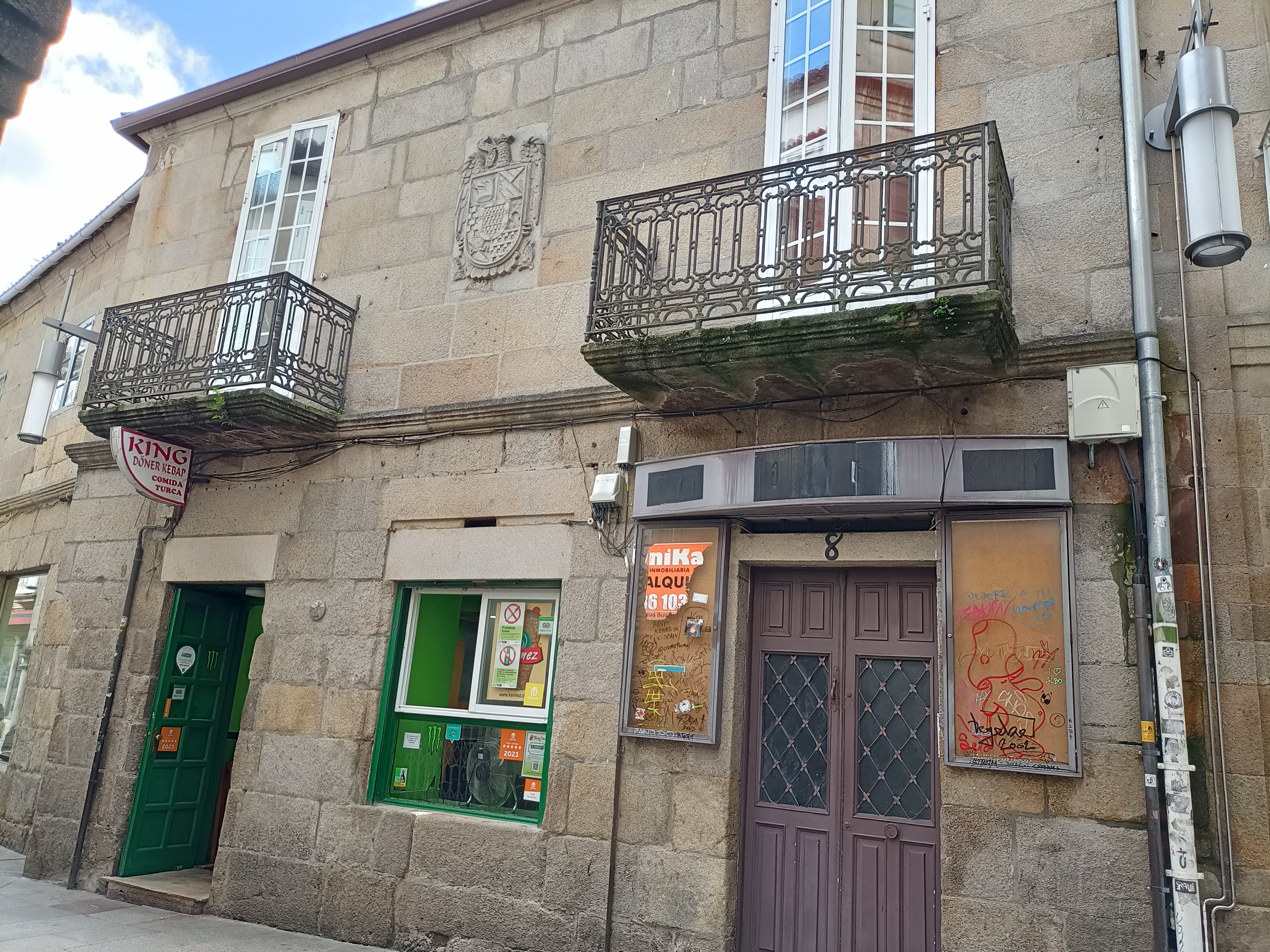
17th-century house with the coat of arms of the Moscoso and Mendoza families.

== See also ==
=== Bibliography ===
- Aganzo, Carlos (2010). Pontevedra. Ciudades con encanto (in Spanish). Madrid: El País-Aguilar. p. 24; 56–57; 61. ISBN 978-8403509344.
- Fontoira Surís, Rafael (2009). Pontevedra monumental (in Galician). Pontevedra: Diputación de Pontevedra. p. 452; 509. ISBN 9788484573272.
- Juega Puig, Juan (2000). As rúas de Pontevedra (in Galician). Pontevedra: Diputación de Pontevedra. p. 112. ISBN 84-8457-044-4.
- Nieto González, Remigio (1980). Pontevedra. Guía monumental ilustrada (in Spanish). Pontevedra: Asociación de comerciantes de la calle Manuel Quiroga. p. 24.
- Saavedra, Segundo (2011). Un corto viaje a Rías Bajas (in Spanish). Madrid: Anaya Touring. p. 37. ISBN 978-84-9776-890-0.

=== Related articles ===
- Old town of Pontevedra
- Verdura Square
- Méndez Núñez Square
