= Ferrara Courthouse =

Judiciary building in Ferrara, Italy

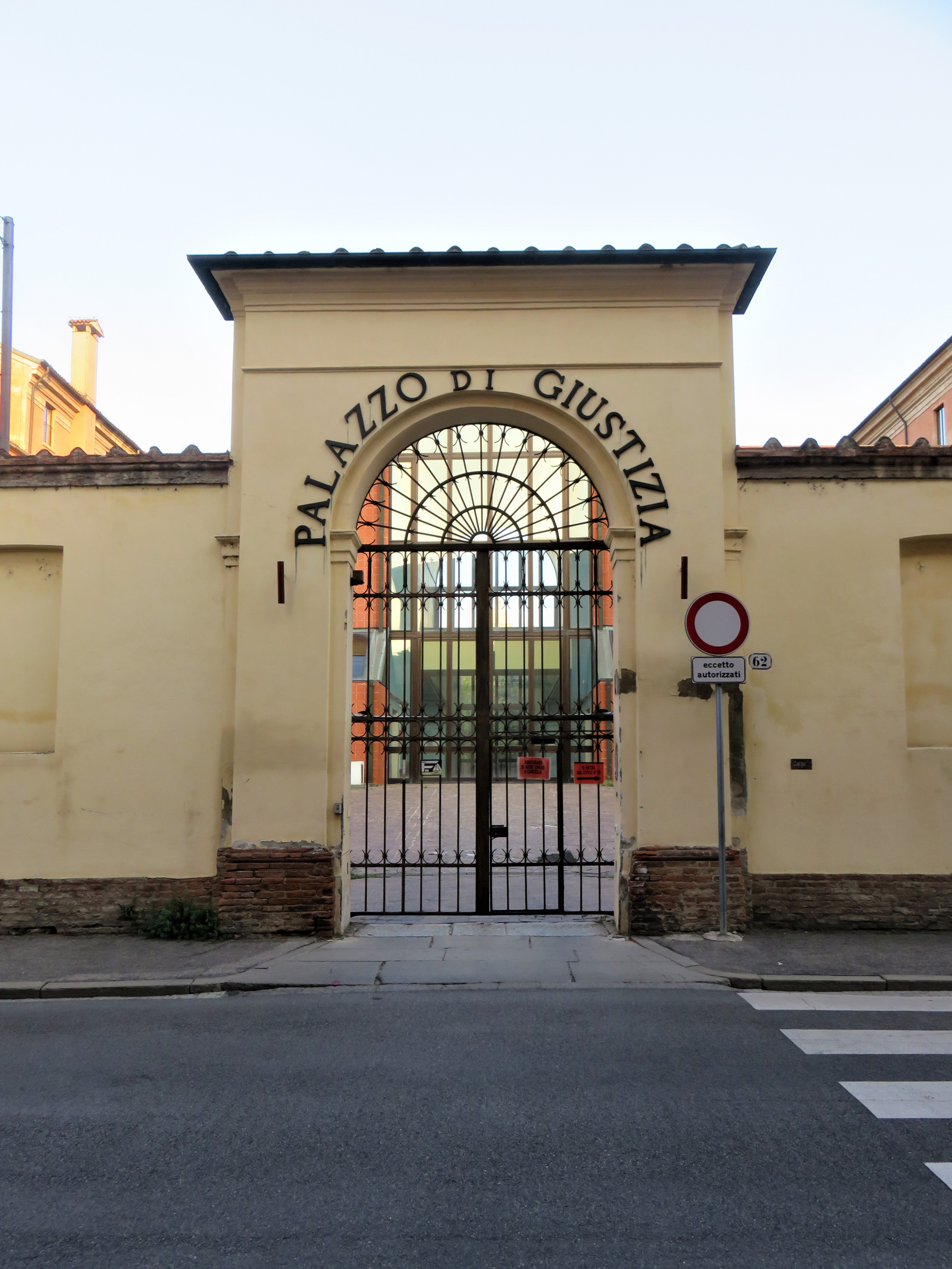
- The main entrance of the courthouse
- Interactive map of the Ferrara Courthouse area

General information
- Type: Courthouse
- Location: Ferrara, Emilia-Romagna, Italy
- Coordinates: 44°50′22.5″N 11°37′18.2″E
- Completed: 1676
- Renovated: 1981–1985

Design and construction
- Architect: Carlo Aymonino
- Engineer: Adolfo Torti, Marcello Vittorini

The Ferrara Courthouse (Italian: Palazzo di Giustizia di Ferrara, lit. 'Palace of Justice of Ferrara') is a judicial complex located on Via Borgo Leoni in Ferrara, Italy.

== History ==
The building was constructed next to the church of Gesù in 1676 and served as a Jesuit college. Later, it became the site of various local schools, including the Royal Scientific High School "Antonio Roiti" and the Royal Classical High School "Ludovico Ariosto".

On 28 April 1975, the project for restoration and expansion of the former convent was commissioned to architect Carlo Aymonino and engineers Adolfo Torti and Marcello Vittorini. The aim was to transform it into the new courthouse. The project was delivered in June 1979 and included restoring the two wings of the convent and replacing the central block with a new structure to house the main entrance and courtrooms. The new building, lower than the side wings and aligned with the clock tower, features a full-height central gallery with a barrel vault ceiling, connecting the courtyard to the entrance square.

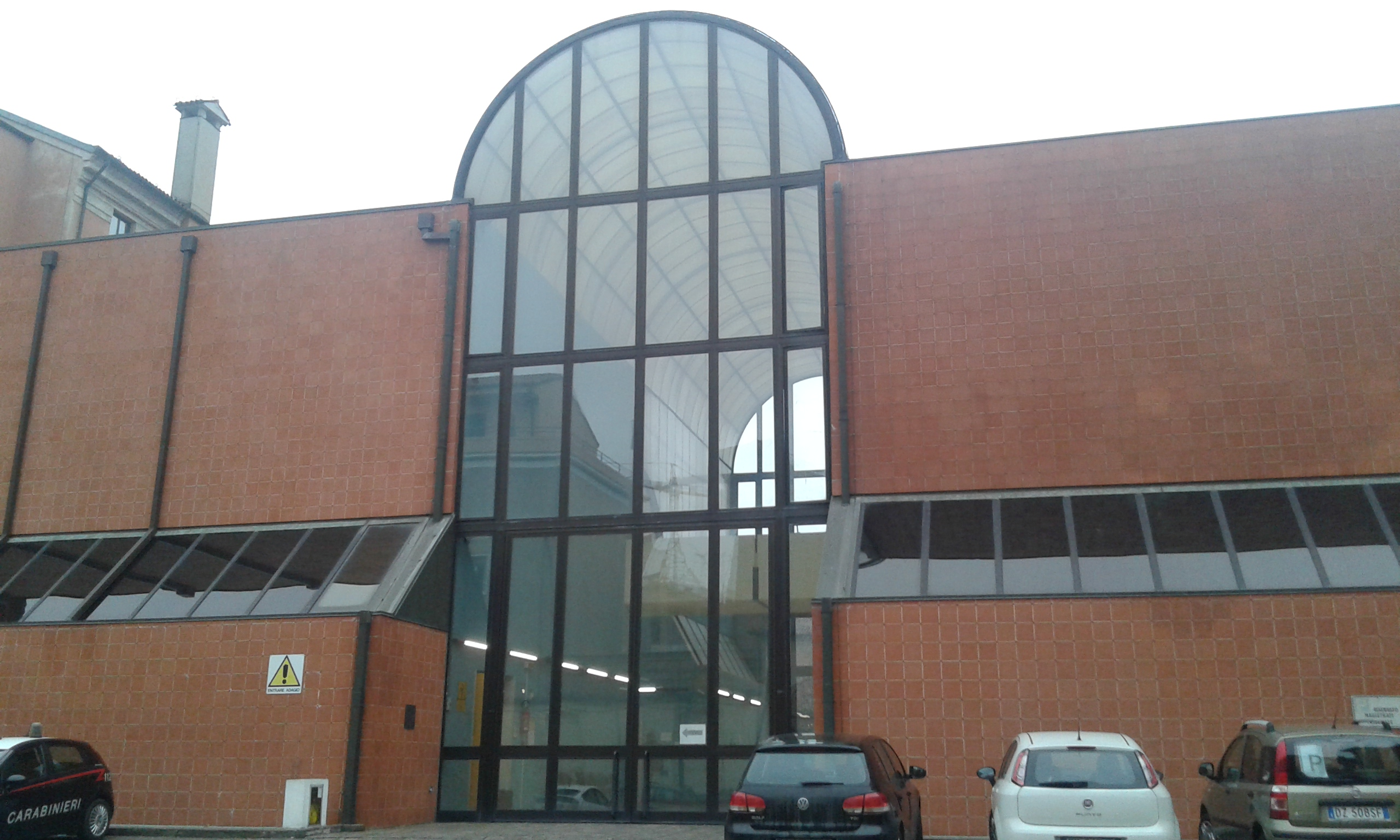
The central building

Construction work was entrusted on 26 November 1980, to the Ferrarese Construction Companies Consortium (CIEF), and construction began in November 1982. It was completed in October 1985, with testing carried out by engineer Gian Paolo Sarti on 30 June 1986. The total cost exceeded 6 billion lire.

== Sources ==
- Aymonino, Carlo (1995). "Palazzo di giustizia di Ferrara". Zodiac. No. 14. pp. 118–127.
- Conforti, Claudia (1980). Carlo Aymonino. L'architettura non è un mito. Rome: Officina. pp. 78–86, 146–147.
- Giorgio Muratore, ed. (1992). Guida all'architettura moderna. Italia. Gli ultimi trent'anni. Bologna: Zanichelli. p. 262.
- Sergio Polano; Marco Mulazzani, eds. (1991). Guida all'architettura italiana del Novecento. Milan: Electa. pp. 324–325.
- Polin, Giacomo (1982). "Carlo Aymonino. Il palazzo di giustizia di Ferrara". Casabella. No. 479. pp. 2–7.
