= College of the Society of Jesus in Pontevedra =

Former Baroque Jesuit College in Pontevedra, Spain

Former College of the Society of Jesus
- Antiguo Colegio de la Compañía
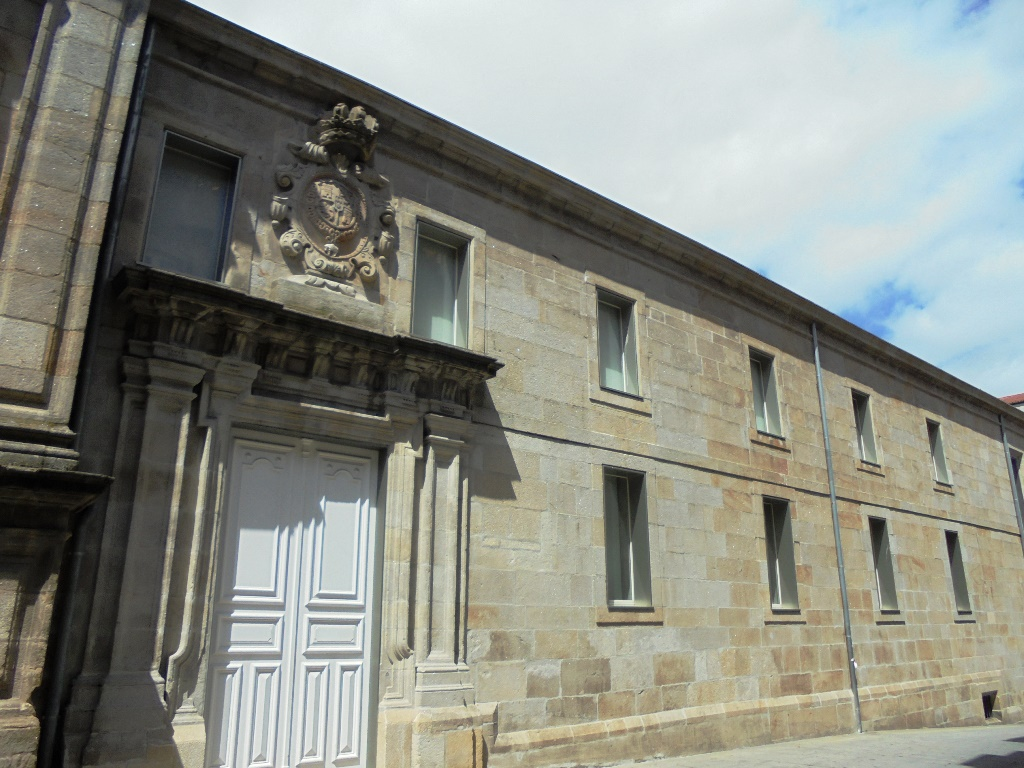
- Interactive map of the Former College of the Society of Jesus area

General information
- Type: Convent
- Location: Pontevedra, Galicia, Spain
- Coordinates: 42°25′59.2″N 8°38′31.8″W
- Construction started: 1695
- Completed: 1714
- Owner: Pontevedra Museum
- Management: Pontevedra Museum

Technical details
- Floor count: 2

The former College of the Jesuits is an 18th-century baroque building located in Sarmiento Street in the heart of the old town of Pontevedra, Spain. A secondary educational institution founded by the Jesuits in 1695, the building is known today as the Sarmiento Building and is one of the seats of the Pontevedra Museum.

== History ==
The construction of the Jesuit College in the city began in 1695 and was completed in 1714, next to their church (today's St. Bartholomew's Church), along the lines of the international Baroque, with an Italian influence adapted to the formulas of the local tradition.

The establishment was sponsored by the priest Jorge de Andrade, and the municipality of Pontevedra, with the aim of bringing together the existing studies in the city into a single establishment. These studies were supervised by a foundation created in 1644, whose board of directors included important noble families such as the Guimarey, Mosquera, Villar and Pimentel families and the Marquis of Aranda. The college had students such as Father Isla or Fray Martín Sarmiento, who gave the building its current name. In 1683 the city council of Pontevedra ceded the land to build the Jesuit convent and school.

In 1767, Charles III decreed the expulsion of the Jesuits from Spain. From that year onwards, the buildings had different functions as the headquarters of different entities and societies, such as the School of First Letters and Latinity or the Cloth factory of the English brothers Lees, pioneers of industrialisation in Galicia. In 1845, it became the first seat of the Provincial High School of Pontevedra (inaugurated on 19 November 1845), where Valle-Inclán studied, and of the Normal School of Teachers of the province of Pontevedra, as well as a primary school. In 1860 it also became the seat of the first teacher training college for women of Galicia.

From 1903 to 1974, the former College of the Society of Jesus was the seat of the Hospice and Orphanage of the province of Pontevedra, which from 1955 onwards was known as the Hogar Provincial. In 1978, the Spanish Ministry of the Interior ceded the building to the Pontevedra Museum to house its collections. Renovation work on the building began in 1979. In September 1981, an exhibition of engravings by Francisco de Goya was held in its cloister. However, the final opening did not take place until 11 August 1984.

Remodeled in early 2010 by the architects Eduardo Pesquera and Jesús Ulargui, the building was reopened on 21 August 2013. The interior cloister has been glazed and the basement and its arcades have been enhanced.

== Description ==
The former Jesuit college and residence has a rectangular plan. On the outside, the building has a long, sober Baroque granite façade with a multitude of symmetrical windows, to which the part closest to Cobián Roffignac Street was later added. It consists of a ground floor and a first floor. The lintelled door in the corner next to the church is remarkable. This door is decorated with plaques and pilasters and above it there is a large carved stone coat of arms of Spain on a medallion.

Inside, a sumptuous stone staircase leads from the ground floor entrance to the first and second floors: it was designed by Mateo López in 1722.

The cloister and the basement are also noteworthy. The cloister has two floors with double arches, four arches on each side and Doric pilasters. It is similar to the cloister of the Jesuit church of Villafranca del Bierzo in the province of León.

The basement has large arcades. The archaeological section of the museum is housed here, including Roman milestones found near the Burgo Bridge. In the basement there is also a restaurant: Ultramar. The first floor displays archaeological collections from the Early Middle Ages and the Romanesque period, including the tympanum of Palmou and two prophets from the Portico of Glory of Santiago de Compostela Cathedral. On the second floor, other rooms are dedicated to the ceramic collections.

== Gallery ==
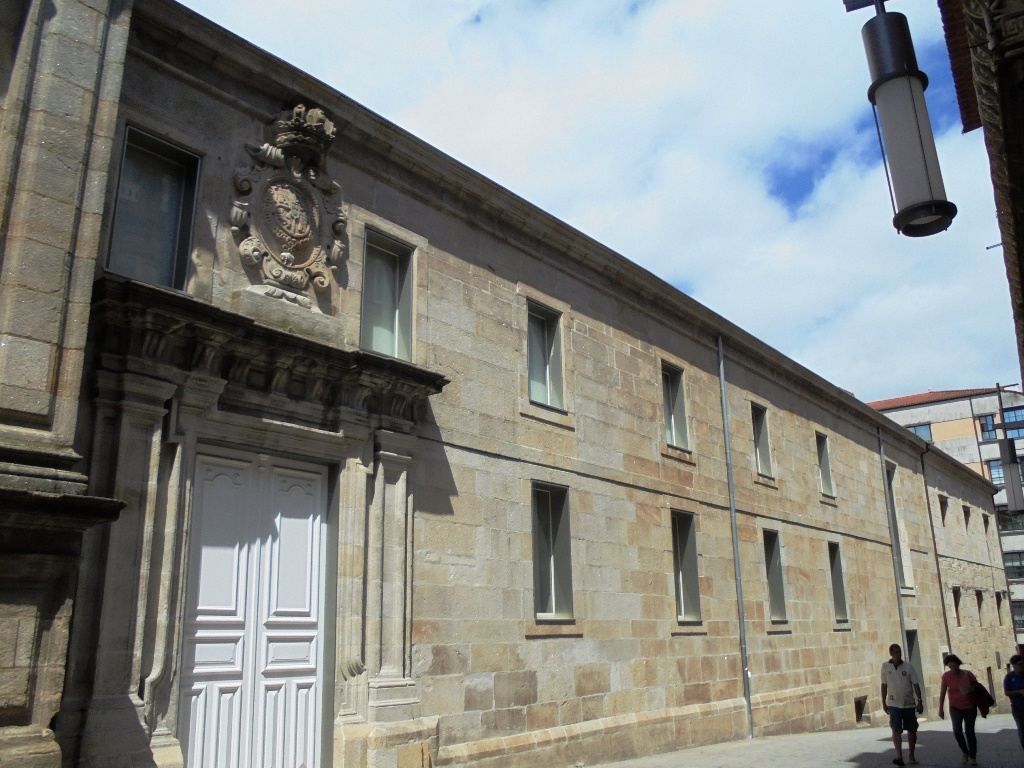
The main façade of the company's college

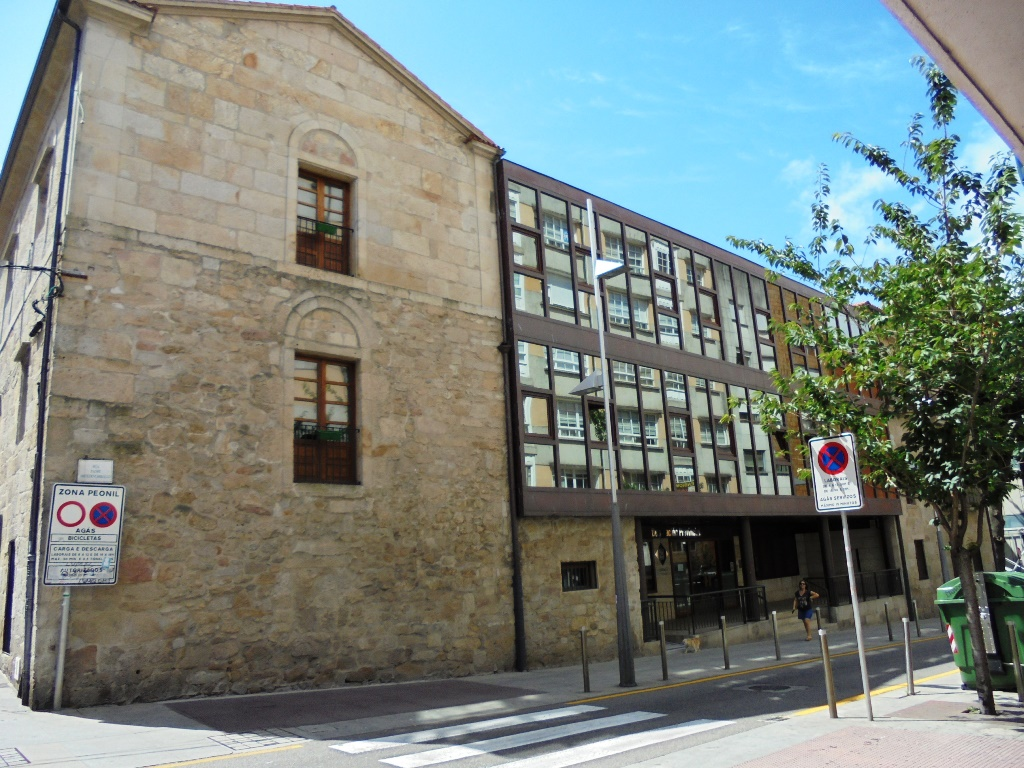
Cobián Roffignac street façade

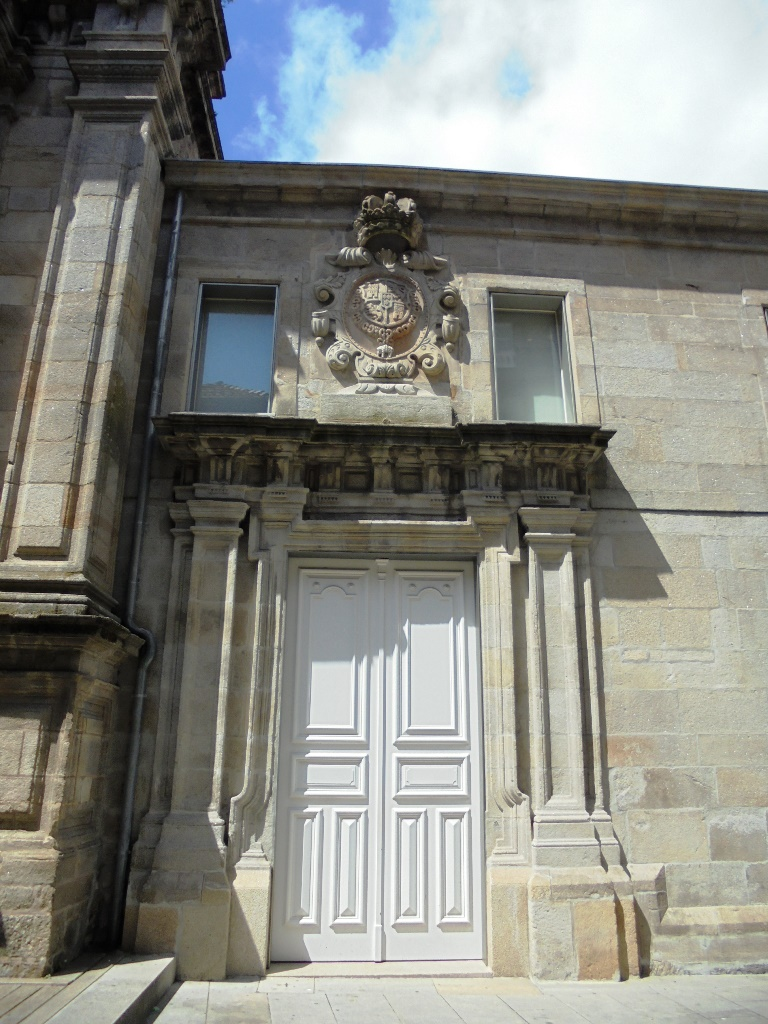
Front door

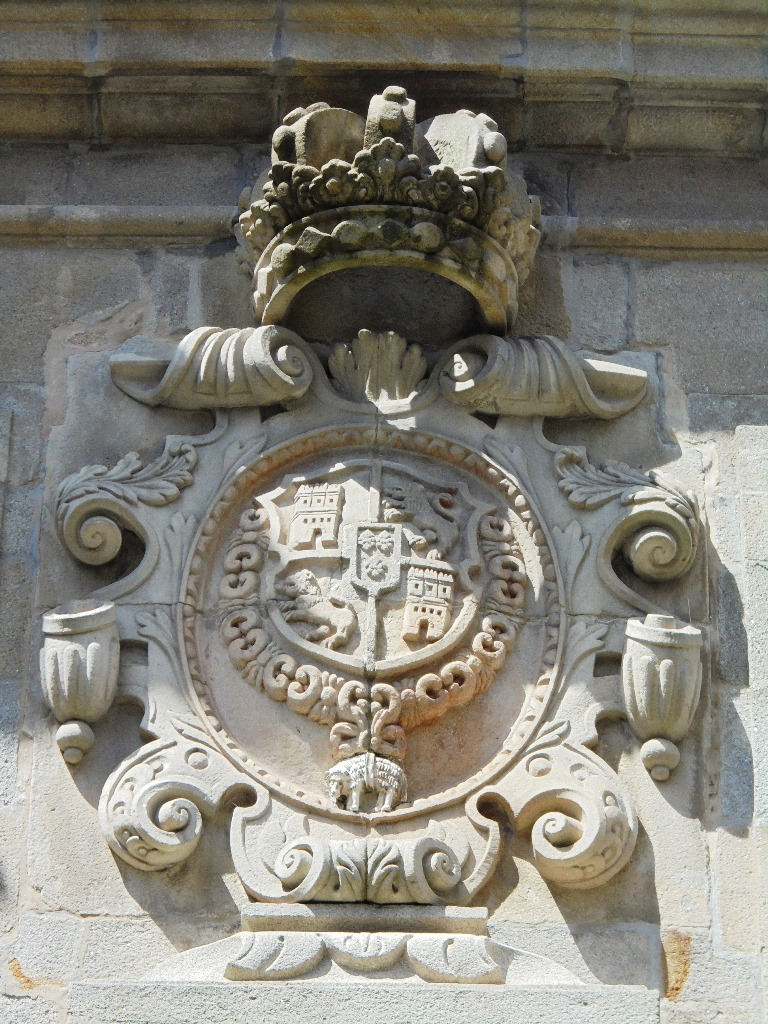
Spanish coat of arms above the portal

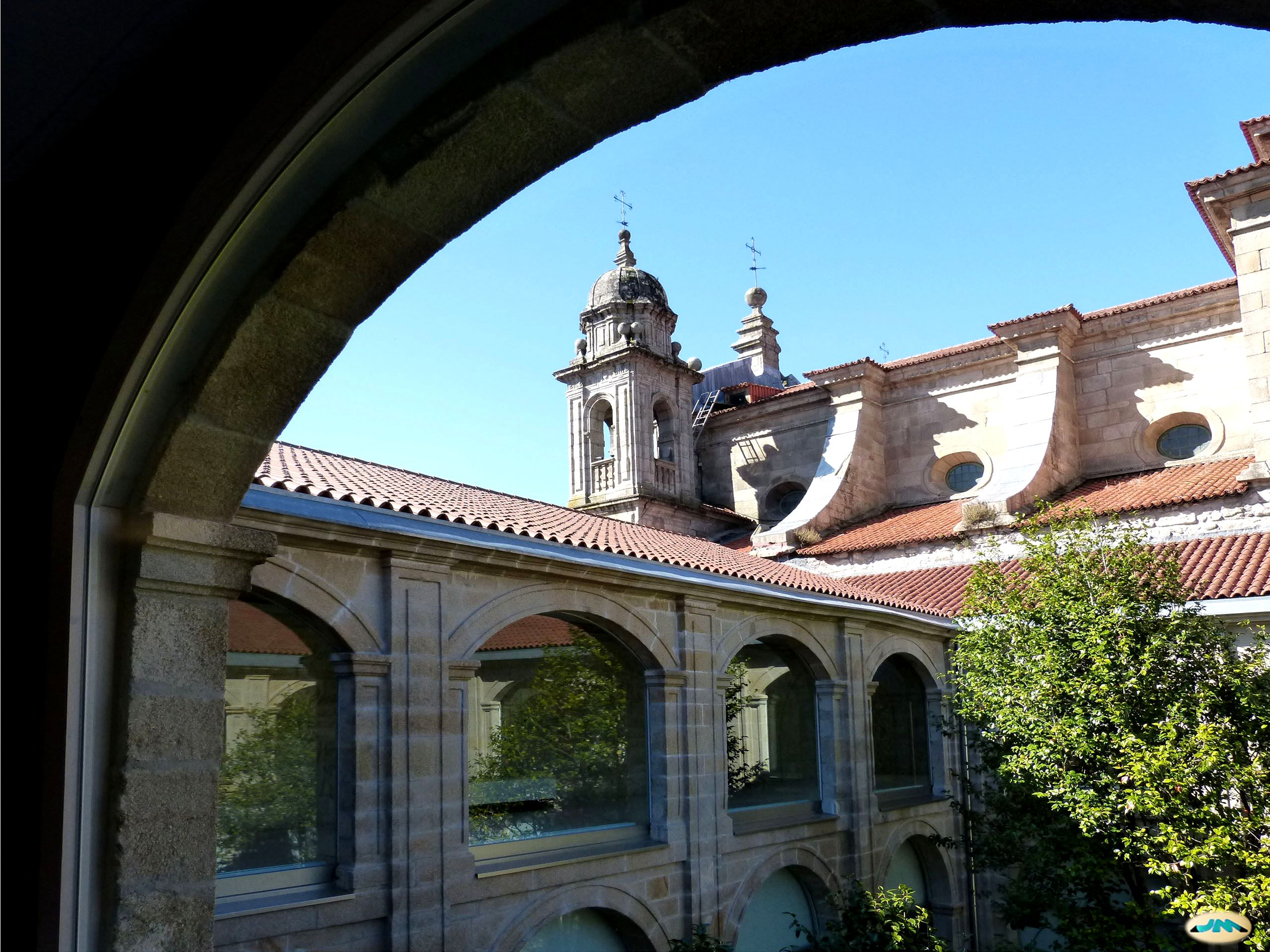
Cloister and adjoining St Bartholomew's Church

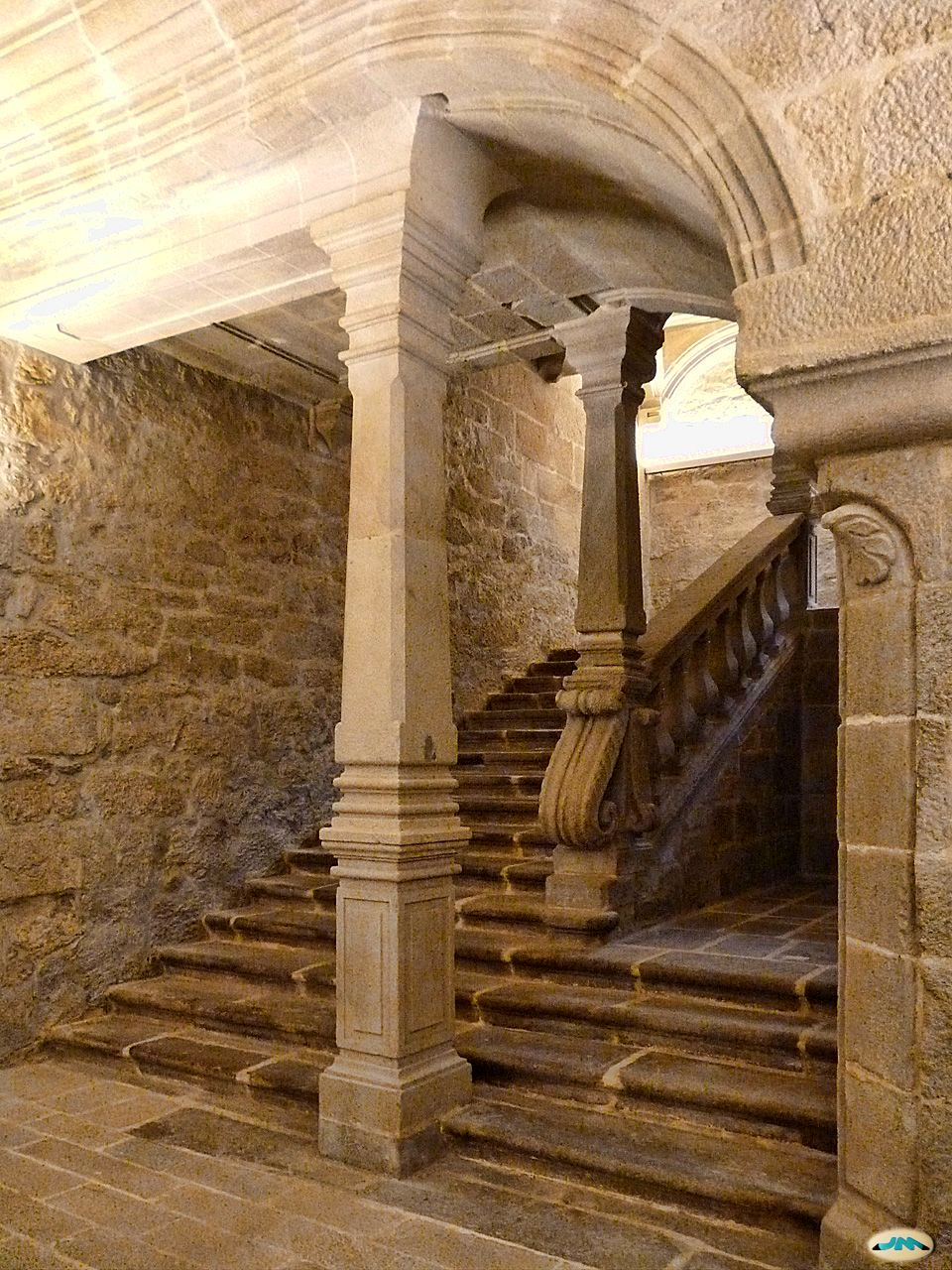
Interior staircase

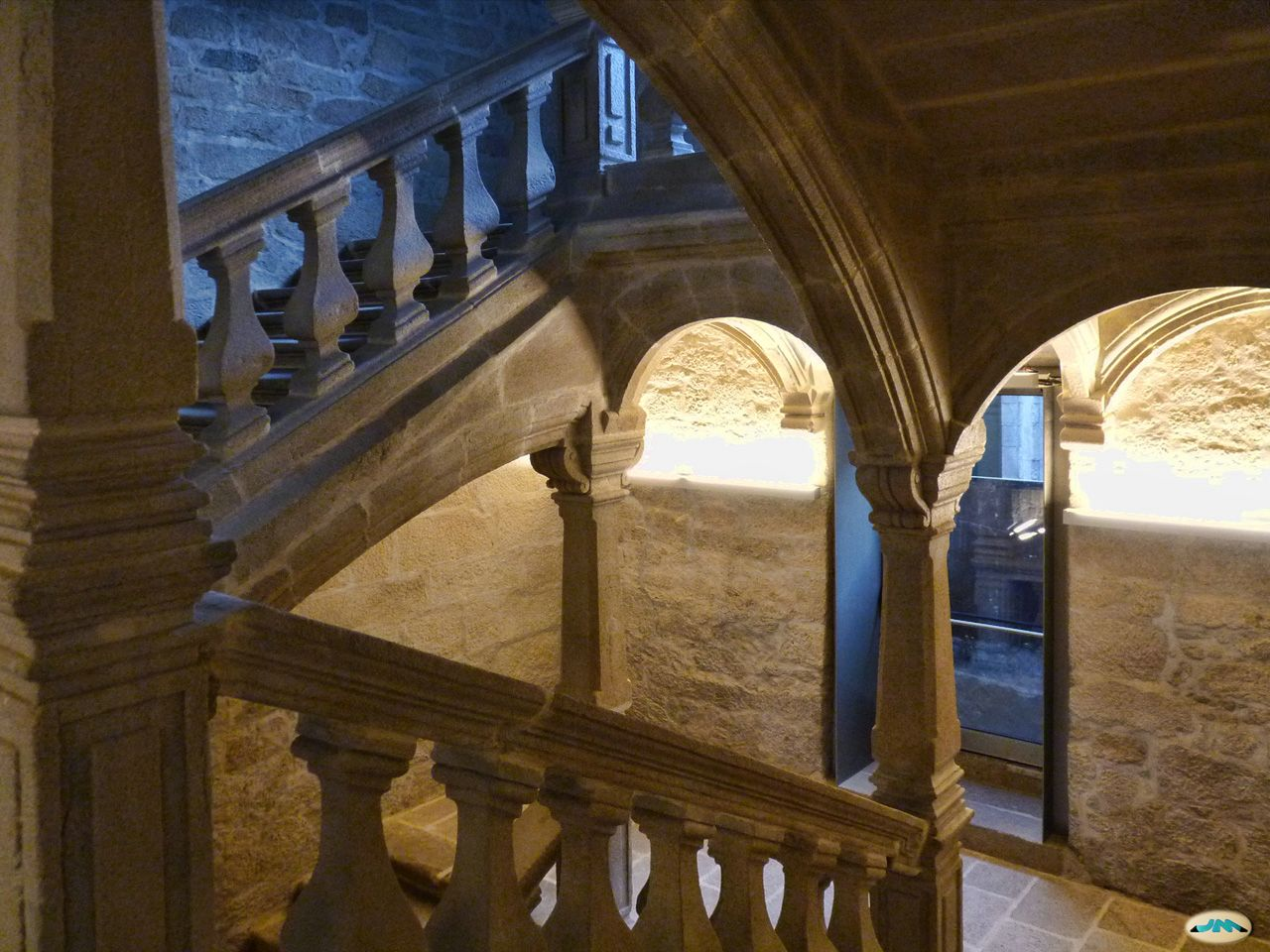
Staircase

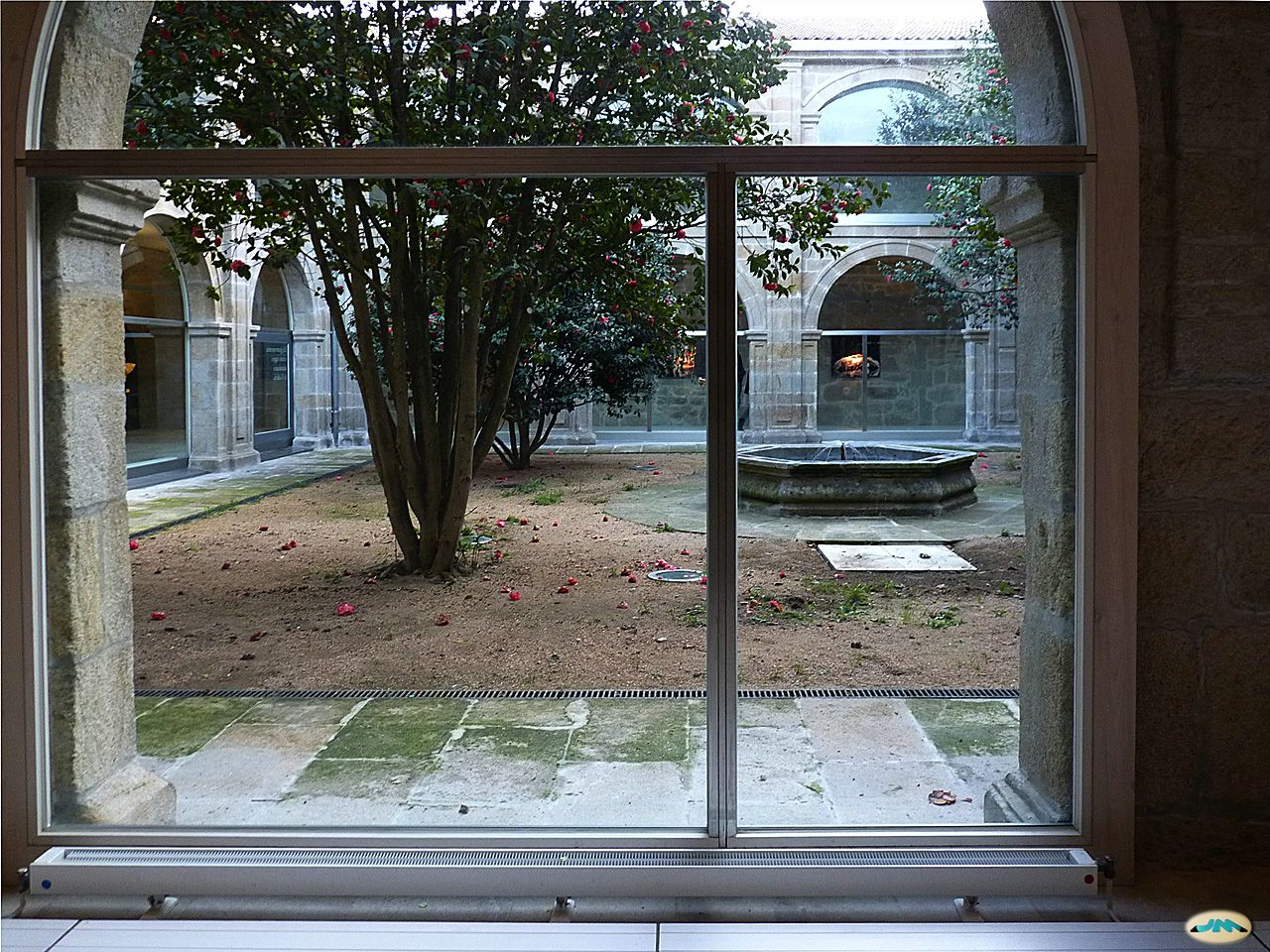
Cloister on the ground floor

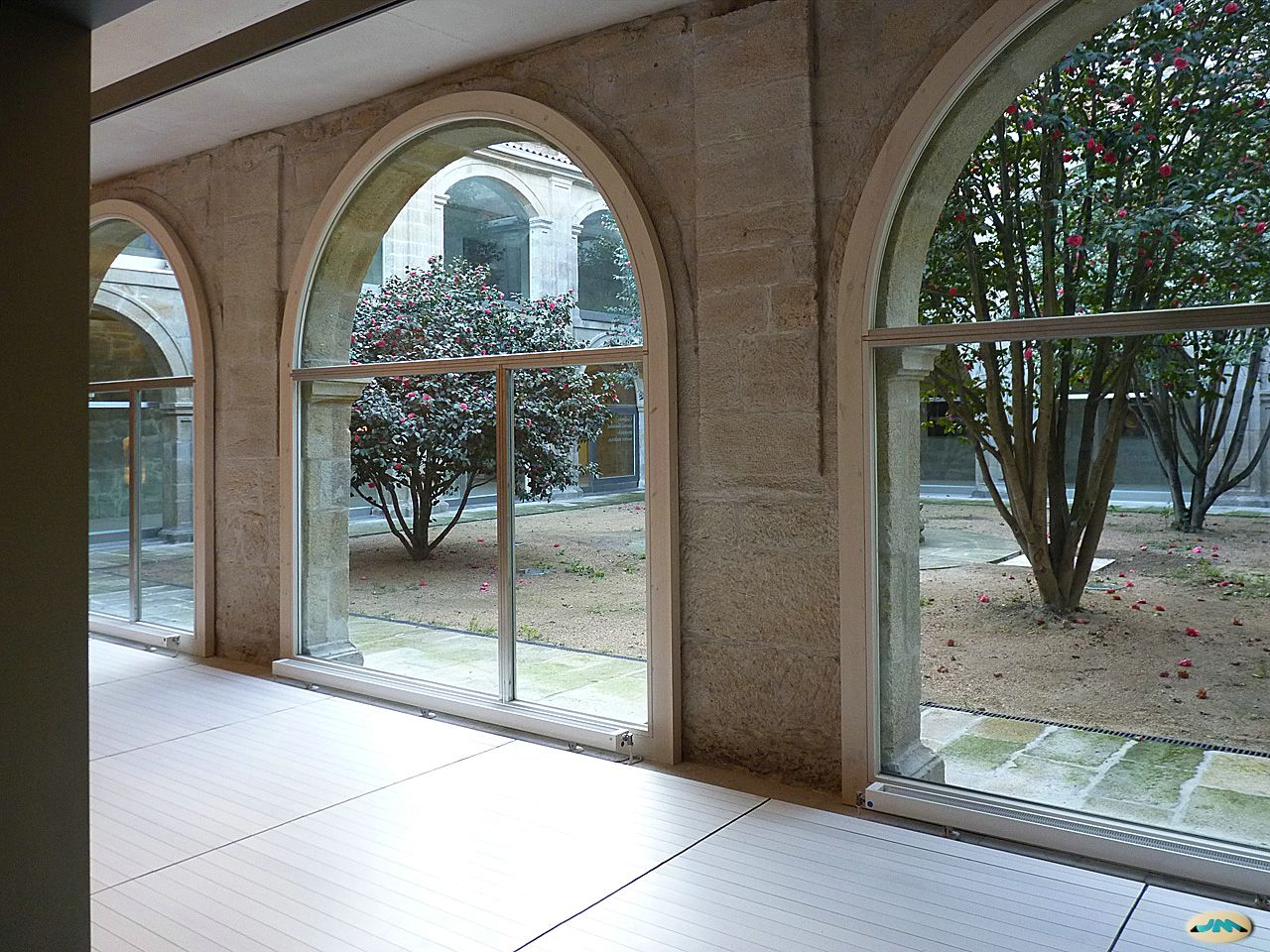
Cloister

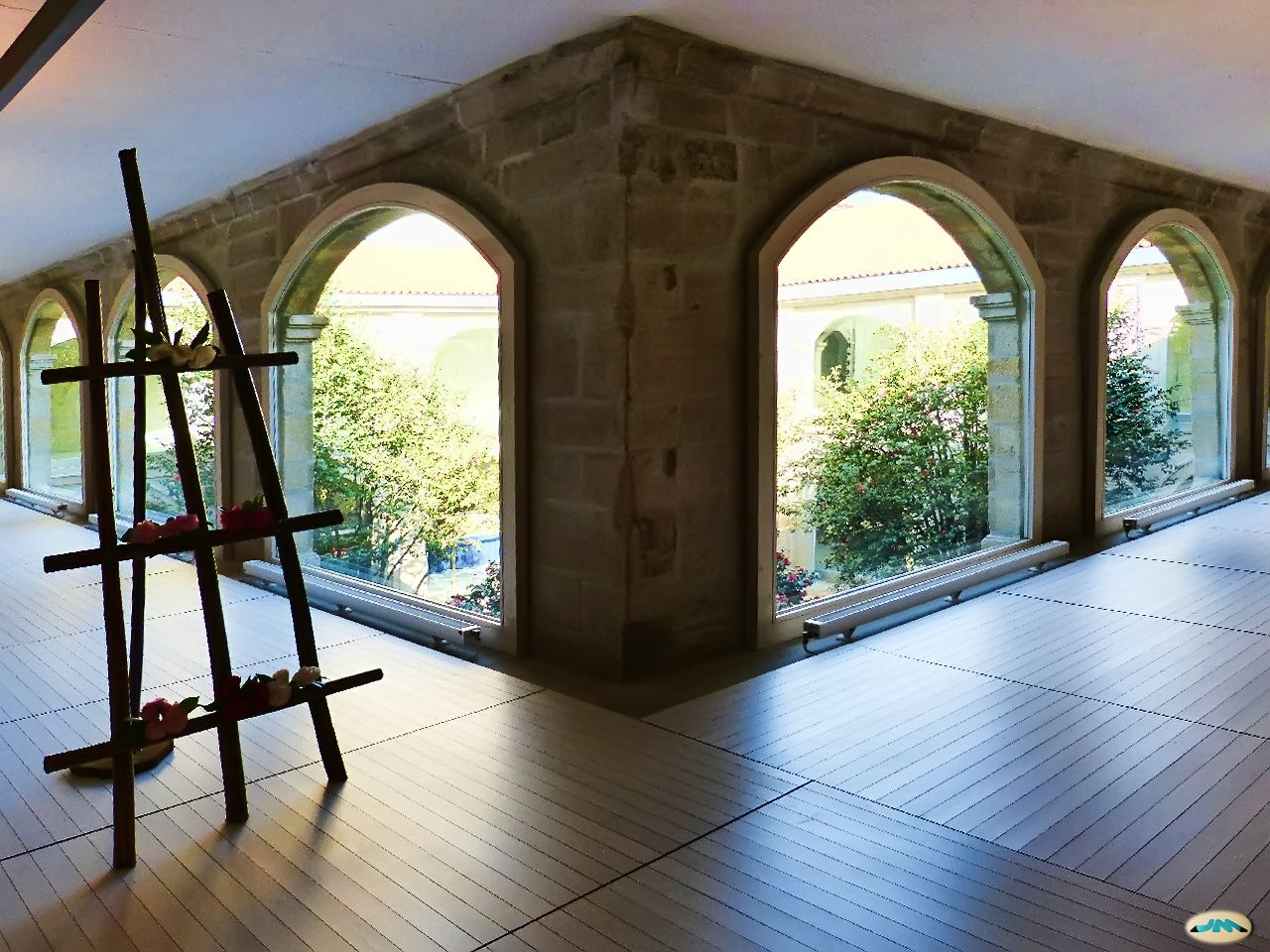
Cloister on the first floor

== See also ==
=== Bibliography ===
- Aganzo, Carlos (2010). Pontevedra. Ciudades con encanto (in Spanish). Madrid: El País-Aguilar. pp. 60–62. ISBN 978-8403509344.
- Fontoira Surís, Rafael (2009). Pontevedra monumental (in Galician). Pontevedra: Diputación Provincial de Pontevedra. pp. 315–323. ISBN 978-84-8457-327-2.
- González Zúñiga, Claudio (1848). Descripción Geográfica, Estadística, Económica e Histórica de la Ciudad Capital de Pontevedra (in Spanish). Pontevedra: Establecimiento Tipográfico de la Viuda de Pintos. p. 12.
- Riveiro Tobío, Elvira (2008). Descubrir Pontevedra (in Spanish). Pontevedra: Edicións do Cumio. p. 62. ISBN 9788482890852.

=== Related articles ===
- Saint Bartholomew's church
- Calle Sarmiento
- Baroque architecture
- Society of Jesus

=== External links ===
- Convent and Jesuit College in Pontevedra.
- Sarmiento Building of the Pontevedra Museum website
- [PDF] First seat of the Normal School of Pontevedra
