= Martín Sarmiento =

Spanish writer

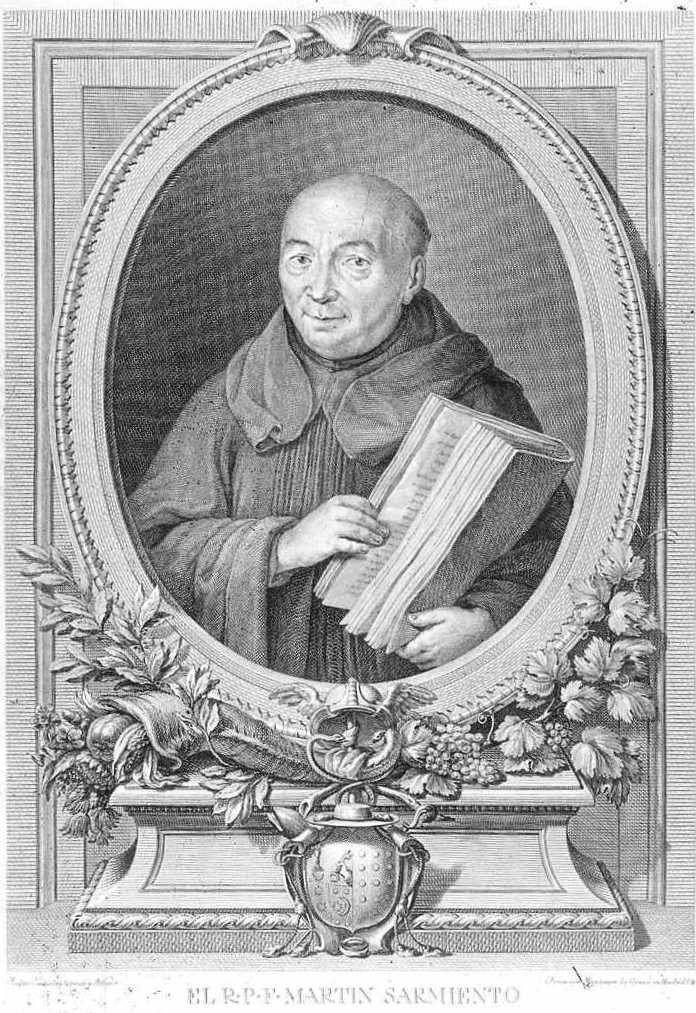
Martín Sarmiento

Martín Sarmiento or Martiño Sarmiento, also Father Sarmiento (born Pedro José García Balboa; 9 March 1695 in Villafranca del Bierzo, El Bierzo – 7 December 1772 in Madrid) was a Spanish scholar, writer and Benedictine monk, illustrious representative of the Enlightenment.

He wrote on a wide variety of subjects, including literature, medicine, botany, ethnography, history, theology, linguistics, and so on.

== His life ==
When he was four months old, he moved with his family to Pontevedra, where he spent his childhood and youth. In Pontevedra he studied at the Jesuit College. On 3 May 1710, when he was 15, he moved to Madrid to join Benedictine order. He was named presbyter in 1720, Sarmiento lived in Asturias until 1725 like a professor in Cebrio and Oviedo. Later he left his mother in Pontevedra. He was definitively settled in Madrid, stay that is interrupted between February 1726 and May 1727, when he moved to Toledo to catalog the books of the cathedral, and also to visit three times Galicia.

When he was 35 years old, he became interested in language again. He thought that people ignored the meaning of the words. He was really interested in languages in general, especially Romanesque languages, but above all, Spanish and Galician. Sarmiento thought that Galician should be taught in schools and priests should know it in order to confess people. In 1745 he returned to Galicia. On this trip he writes the names of the places he is going through in a notebook. He liked to investigate the etymology of the Galician words. He wrote a book in Galician called Colloquium of twenty-four rustic Galicians, thanks to which we know the Galician that was spoken at that time. It contains 1,200 songs sung by a group of Galicians returning from Madrid. They tell us about the death of King Philip V was and he described the celebrations of the accession to the throne of Ferdinand VI.

== His thought ==
Sarmiento was not only interested in linguistics, he was interested in other disciplines such as botany and medicine. He had a large knowledge of the names of the plants and their health properties. He was quite concerned about the improvement of the technical and economic level of his country, specially in the Enlightenment ideas. His erudition in many disciplines made him be commissioned the iconographic program that would decorate the Royal Palace of Madrid. Sarmiento designed an ambitious allegory of the history of the Spanish monarchy for the palace, it was so complex that only a part of it was done.

He fought, with Feijoo, against superstition and ignorance, proposing to open libraries in the villages. He had one of the most important libraries in Spain at that time. Unlike his teacher Feijoo, Sarmiento understood that it was necessary to know and keep traditions and popular culture. In that he was a great precursor and he contributed to the investigation and recovery of the Galician culture.

Sarmiento died at San Martin convent in Madrid, on 7 December 1772, aged 77.

He posted two books in Feijoo's memory Demostración crítico-apologética del Theatro Crítico Universal in 1732. He wrote other books but they were not published.

== Selected works ==
- Memorias para la historia de la poesía y poetas españoles, (1741-1745), first edition, Madrid, 1775.
- Coplas gallegas y Glosario, (1746-...), in the Galician language.
- Notas al Privilegio de Ordoño y Reflexiones sobre Archiveros
- Disertación sobre el animal zebra, nacido, criado, conocido y cazado antiguamente en España

== Bibliography ==
- Pensado Tomé, José Luis, Fray Martín Sarmiento, testigo de su siglo, Salamanca: Universidad de Salamanca, 1972.

== Related articles ==
- Sarmiento Street
