= Church of Gesù, Nice =

Church building in Nice, France

Coordinates: 43.6968°N 7.2773°E

Church of Gesù, Nice Église du Gesù
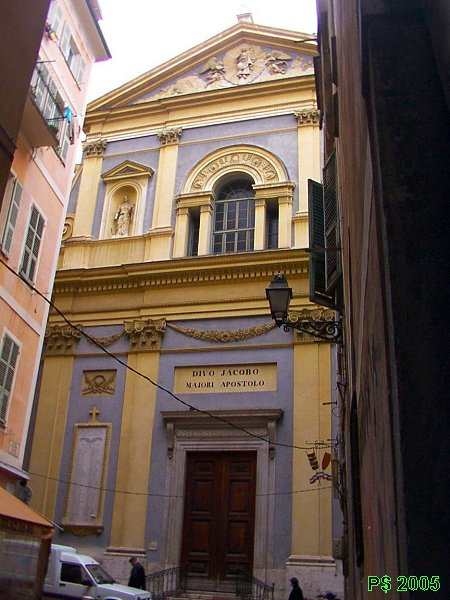
- Church of Gesù, Nice

Religion
- Affiliation: Roman Catholic
- Diocese: Diocese of Nice

Location
- Location: Nice, France
- Interactive map of Church of Gesù, Nice; Église du Gesù

Architecture
- Architect: Jean-André Guiberto
- Type: Church
- Style: Baroque
- Completed: 1650

Church of the Gesù, Nice also known as The Church of Saint-Jacques-le-Majeur of Nice (French: Église du Gesù or French: L’église Saint-Jacques-le-Majeur) is a Roman Catholic church located on Rue Droite in the old town of Nice in the south of France. It is in the Baroque architectural tradition. The church became a parish in 1802 under the patronage of Jacques le Majeur.

== History ==
In 1603, Pons Neva, a wealthy Nicoise merchant based in Rome, gave a large donation for the establishment of a Jesuit school at the suggestion of Philippe Néri. The Jesuits established themselves in Nice near a communal mill on November 15, 1603. The school opened in 1606.

The cornerstone of the school was laid on February 12, 1607. They began to purchase neighboring houses for the establishment of their chapel and continued acquiring until 1612. The cornerstone of the church, named Chiesetta and dedicated to Jesus, was laid June 3, 1612. To further expand the church, the Jesuits purchased another house next door.

The work of the new church began in 1642. The major construction finished in 1650. The Jesuits sold the scaffolding used in the construction of the arches to the Roman Catholic Diocese of Nice.

The similarities between the new church and the Church of Escarène and the Nice Cathedral suggests that the architect was likely Jean-André Guiberto. In the National Library of France there is a map that bears the name Alessio di Angelis but it is impossible to say if he is the architect.

In 1651, two family chapels were erected by Senator Blancardi et Jean-Baptiste Fabri.

As part of the suppression of the Jesuits by Pope Clement XIV, the Jesuits were expelled from Nice in 1773. The school and the church were declared royal possessions. The church became a parish after the Concordat of 1801 under the patronage of Jacques le Majeur.

The church's current Baroque facade was completed in 1825 by Aycart. It is a listed historical monument since 1971.

== Features ==
The church is an example of Baroque architecture.

Historians who studied the building have noticed the similarities between the Church of Jesus in Nice and the Church of the Gesù in Rome. The Nice church was influenced by the Piedmontese baroque style with the constraints of a Roman edifice.

The facade is Corinthian. The presence of Mannerist features with Serlian, or Palladian windows lead historians to believe that it is from the 17th Century. Certain elements are neoclassical.

The campanile is 42 meters tall. It features exposed brick, which is rare in Nice, and similar to Piedmontese art. The base of the dome is covered in Ligurian tiles. The stucco exterior is less similar to Ligurian mannerism and more common to Piemontese baroque.

In the interior, the semicircular vault measures 36 meters long and 14 meters wide. It is decorated with motifs illustrating the life of Saint Jacques le Majeur. They were created in the 19th Century based on the drawings by Nicoise painter Hercule Trachel (1820–1872) who also painted the vaults in the church of the monastery in Cimiez.

== Bibliography ==
- Dominique Foussard, Georges Barbier, Baroque niçois et monégasque, Paris, Picard éditeur, 1988, p. 317 ISBN 2-7084-0369-9
