= Gesù, Ferrara =

Roman Catholic church in Ferrara, Italy

Coordinates: 44.8391°N 11.6212°E

Church of the Gesù
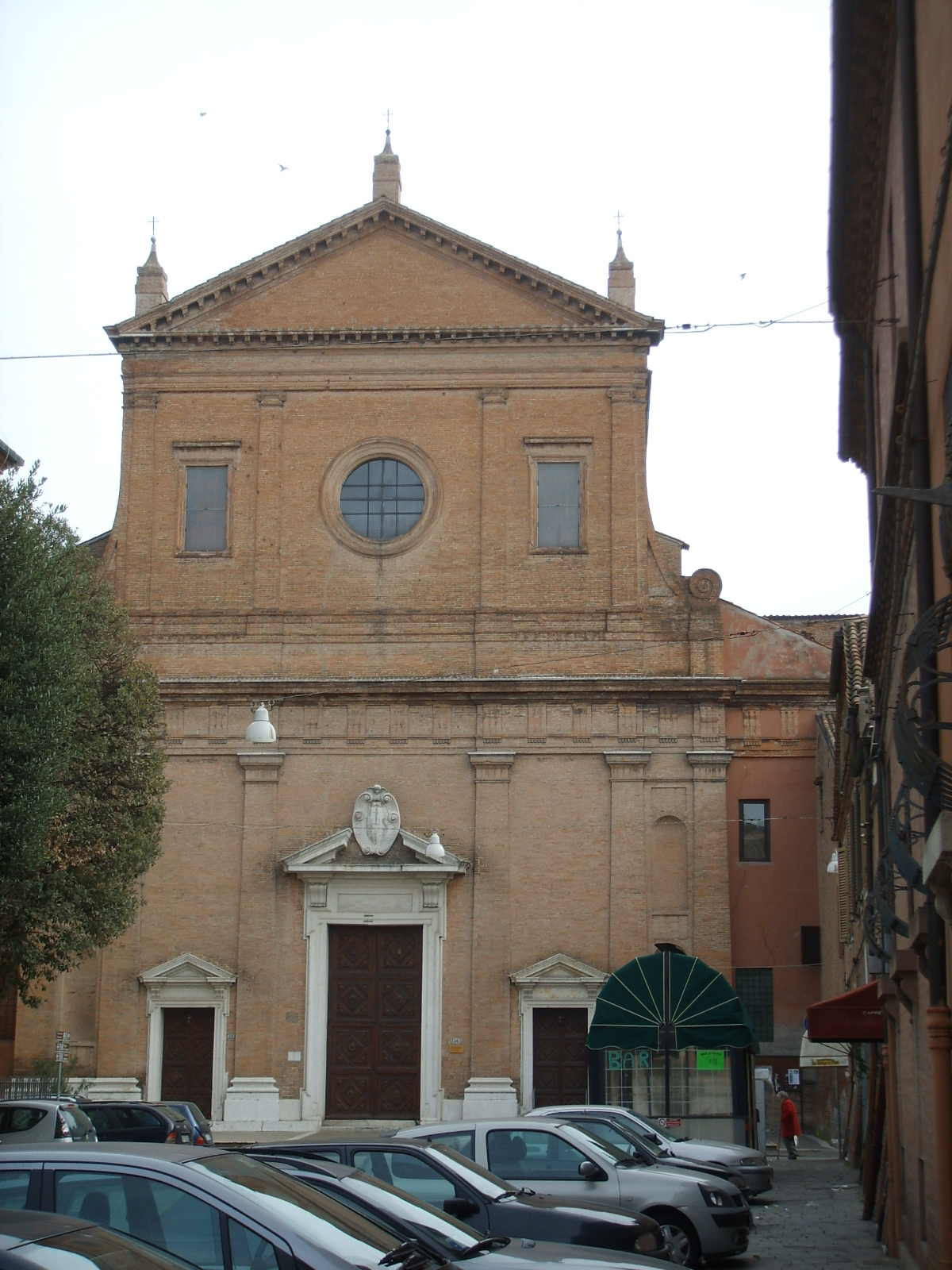
- Facade

Religion
- Affiliation: Roman Catholic
- Province: Ferrara

Location
- Location: Ferrara, Italy
- Interactive map of Church of the Gesù

Architecture
- Type: Church

The Church of the Gesù of Ferrara is a Roman Catholic church, erected by the Jesuit order, located on piazzetta Torquato Tasso in Via Borgoleoni #56 in Ferrara, Region of Emilia-Romagna, Italy

== History ==
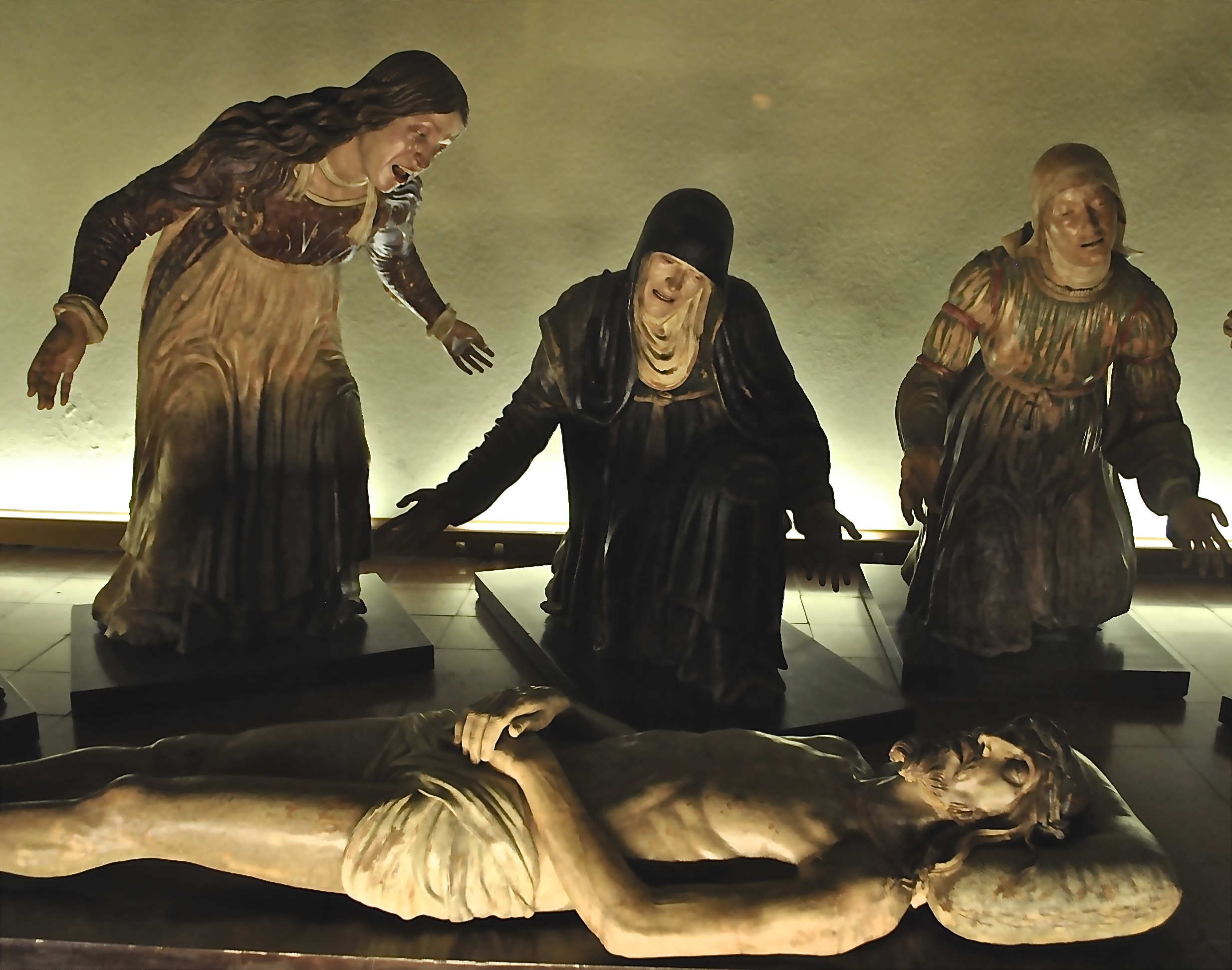
Guido Mazzoni, Mourning Over Christ, detail, (1483-1485 ca.)

The architect Alberto Schiatti designed the church in 1570 for the Jesuits. The facade is sober. The interior decoration was mostly lost as a result of a fire and the suppression of the order in 1773. The church became property of the Somaschi Order priests until the return of the Jesuits in 1814. The adjacent convent was transformed into a courthouse in 1985. Of the works now in the church is a 15th-century terracotta sculptural group: Mourning Over Christ by Guido Mazzoni; this was brought here from the razed church of Santa Maria della Rosa. In the apse stands the Mausoleum of Barbara of Austria, Alfonso II d'Este's second wife, realised at the end of the 1500s by Francesco Casella.

== See also ==
- Ferrara Courthouse
- List of Jesuit sites
