= Gran (name) =

Gran is a name. Notable people with the name include the following:

Given name or nickname

- Gran Akuma (born 1974), American wrestler
- Gran Cochisse (born 1952), retired Mexican Luchador, or professional wrestler
- Gran Hamada (1950–2025), stage name of Japanese wrestler Hiroaki Hamada
- Gran Wilson, American operatic lyric tenor

Middle name

- Christen Gran Bøgh (1876–1955), Norwegian jurist, tourism promoter and theatre critic
- Halfdan Gran Olsen (1910–1971), Norwegian competition rower and Olympic medalist
- Jens Gran Gleditsch (1860–1931), Norwegian bishop and theologian
- Kristen Gran Gleditsch (1867–1946), Norwegian military officer and topographer, brother of Jens

Surname

- Albert Gran (1862–1932), Norwegian-born, American stage and film actor
- Bjarne Gran (1918–1992), Norwegian journalist, historian and literary consultant
- Carol Gran (née Millard; born 1941), former political figure in British Columbia
- Daniel Gran (1694–1757), Austrian painter
- Einar Lilloe Gran (1886–1966), Norwegian engineer and pioneer of aviation
- Frauke Schmitt Gran, German orienteering competitor
- Gerhard Gran (1856–1925), Norwegian literary historian, editor, essayist and biographer
- Gunnar Gran (born 1931), Norwegian media executive
- Haaken Hasberg Gran (1870–1955), Norwegian botanist
- Heinrich Gran (active 1489–1527), German book printer
- Iegor Gran (born 1964), Russian-born French novelist
- Jens Gran (1794–1881), Norwegian politician
- John Willem Gran (1920–2008), Norwegian bishop
- Julia Gran, American graphic designer and children's book illustrator
- Lars Ivar Gran (born 1959), Norwegian sprint canoeist
- Maurice Gran (born 1949), British script writer
- Øyulv Gran (1902–1972), Norwegian writer
- Sara Gran (born 1971), American author
- Stein Gran (born 1958), Norwegian football player
- Tryggve Gran DSC, MC (1888–1980), Norwegian aviator, explorer and author
- Wiera Gran (1916–2007), Polish singer and actress, also known as Weronika Grynberg, Vera Gran and Mariol

== See also ==
- Gran (disambiguation)
