= Gran Abuelo =

Gran Abuelo is Spanish for great grandfather.

Gran Abuelo may also refer to:

- Alerce Milenario, a very old tree in Chile, also known as "Gran Abuelo" in Spanish
- Maximón, a Mayan deity also known as "El Gran Abuelo" in Spanish
- Gran Abuelo (horse), a Venezuelan racehorse that won the 2002 Clásico del Caribe

== See also ==
- Gran (disambiguation)
