= Ontario Tillman =

American politician

Member of the Alabama House of Representatives from the 56th district
- Incumbent
- Assumed office November 9, 2022
- Preceded by: Louise Alexander

Personal details
- Born: Bessemer, Alabama
- Party: Democratic
- Education: Bachelor of Science in special education, Master of Education in collaborative teaching
- Alma mater: Miles Law School; Alabama A&M University
- Profession: Lawyer

Ontario Tillman is an American politician who has served as a member of the Alabama House of Representatives since November 8, 2022. He represents Alabama's 56th House district. He is a member of the Democratic Party.

== Education ==
Tillman graduated from Jess Lanier High School in 1996. He earned a Bachelor of Science in special education and a Master of Education in collaborative teaching from Alabama A&M University. He earned a Juris Doctor from Miles Law School. He is a member of Phi Beta Sigma.

== Electoral history ==
He was elected on November 8, 2022, in the 2022 Alabama House of Representatives election against Libertarian opponent Carson Lester. He assumed office the next day on November 9, 2022.

Alabama House of Representatives
Preceded by Louise Alexander	Member of the Alabama House of Representatives; 2022–present	Succeeded by incumbent
