= Pontevedra Normal School Building =

Eclectic style building in Pontevedra, Spain

- Antiguo Edificio de la Escuela Normal de Pontevedra
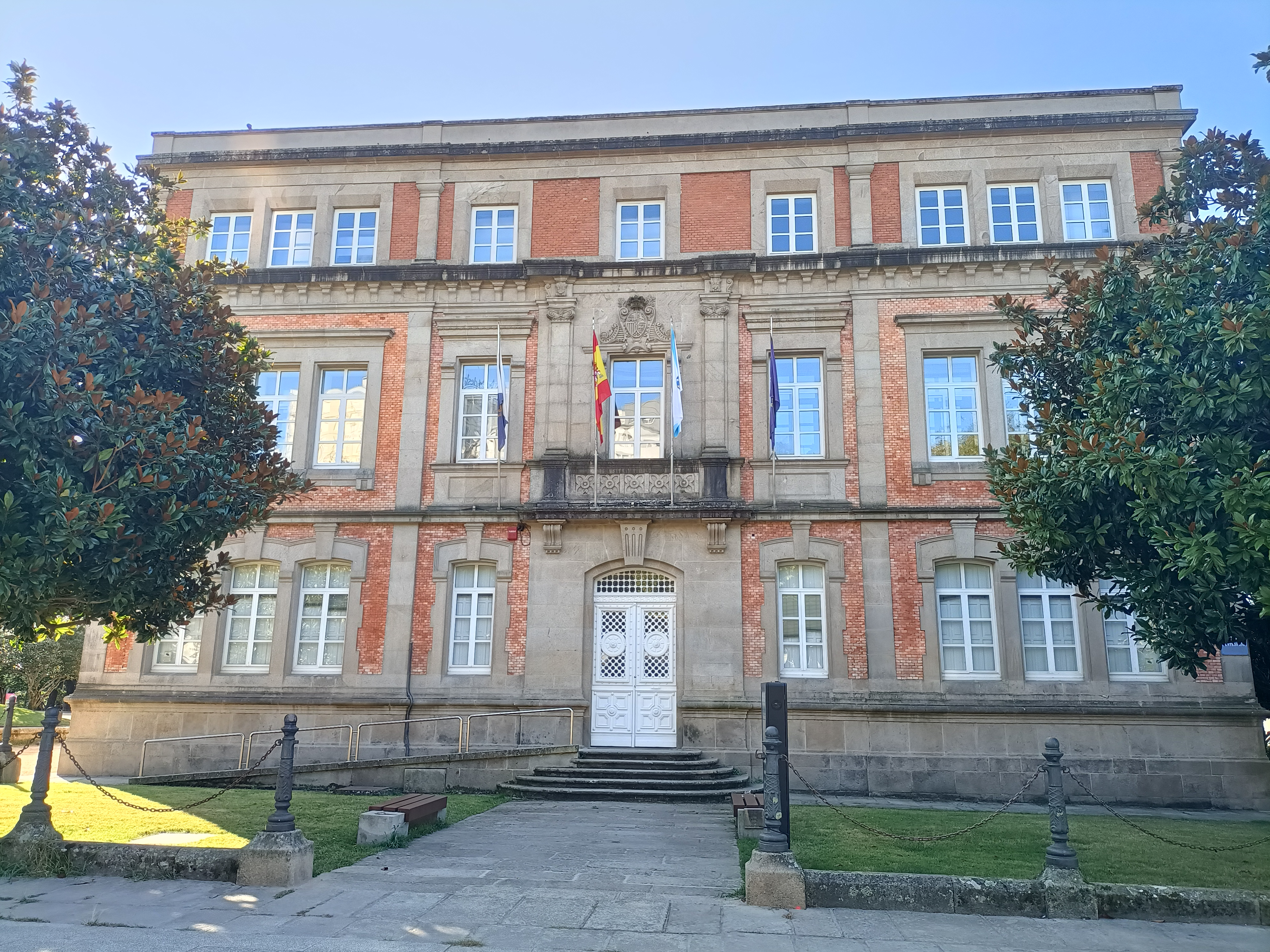
- Façade of the Pontevedra former Normal School Building
- Interactive map of the Pontevedra Normal School Building area

General information
- Type: Government building
- Location: Pontevedra, Galicia, Spain
- Coordinates: 42°25′46.9″N 8°38′56.0″W
- Construction started: 1896
- Completed: 1901
- Opening: 1901
- Cost: 260,000 pesetas
- Owner: Deputation of Pontevedra
- Management: Deputation of Pontevedra

Technical details
- Floor count: 3

Design and construction
- Architect: Arturo Calvo Tomelén

Website
- Official website

The building of the former Pontevedra Normal School of Pontevedra (Teacher Training College and Arts and Crafts), in Pontevedra, Spain, is an eclectic building from the end of the 19th century that was the headquarters of the teacher training college of this Galician city. It is located on the Gran Vía de Montero Ríos, between the Alameda de Pontevedra and the Palm Trees Park.

== History ==
Until the end of the 19th century, the women's teacher training school was located in Pontevedra in the baroque pazo of the García Flórez family (today owned by the Pontevedra Museum) and the men's teacher training school was located in the Pazo of Mugartegui, or pazo of the Counts of Fefiñáns.

In the 1880s, the Pontevedra City Council acquired the property of the Munaiz family located on the Gran Vía Avenue, a building plot on an avenue that had been laid out ten years earlier. It was decided to build a new building for a school of arts and crafts which eventually housed the provincial teacher training school as well as the provincial high school at different times.

In 1895, the project to build the School of Arts and Crafts was launched. The work was entrusted to the architect of the Ministry of Development (Fomento) Arturo Calvo Tomelén, who had designed buildings such as the Palace of Joaquín Sánchez de Toca Calvo (now the Brazilian Embassy in Madrid). In November 1895 Arturo Calvo completed his project. The works were awarded on 1 May 1896 to the Madrid builder García Dios. The building was built opposite the Palace of the Deputation of Pontevedra which had been inaugurated in 1890. The building was completed and inaugurated in 1901.

The total cost of the project was over 260,000 pesetas. In 1903 the building was used as the Provincial High School of Pontevedra, to put an end to the numerous expenses incurred by the repairs of the old Jesuit College. The building housed the Normal Male Teachers' School at the back and the Normal Female Teachers' School at the front. Over the years, its function changed and it temporarily became the city's women's high school in the late 1960s. From the 1970s onwards it was the seat of the provincial education office.

With the transfer of the Provincial Education Office to Campolongo in 2008 to the new building in the twin towers of the Galician Government, the building lost its function as the Provincial Education Office and was handed over to the Pontevedra Provincial Council, which renovated it inside. It was inaugurated as the administrative building of the Provincial Council of Pontevedra on 11 February 2011.

== Description ==
It is a large eclectic style building with a square ground plan and with three floors and a half basement. Initially the building had two floors and a recessed floor which later became a full third floor. Prior to the construction of the entire third-floor space, the front façade was crowned in the centre by a circular stone pediment with the Spanish coat of arms.

The facade has the traditional two-colour scheme of fine reddish and pinkish bricks and granite, including the decorative stone details around the windows and the pilasters. It is surrounded by a granite base. The bricks, which were very fashionable at the end of the 19th century and the beginning of the 20th century on the façades, came from the old brick factory of La Barca, very close to A Caeira. They can also be found on the façade of the Pontevedra bullring.

The building has the peculiarity that all the windows of the four façades are twinned, except for the windows of the central bodies of the front and rear façades. On the first floor of the central body of the rear façade there is a balcony with geometric decoration with four eight-pointed stars instead of balustrades, and on the front façade there is a balcony with five floral motifs. All the windows on the first floor are crowned with geometric decoration in the centre of the lintels.The first-floor balcony door on the front façade is flanked by Ionic pilasters and crowned with a stone coat of arms of Spain, marking its institutional function.

The interior of the building was successively remodelled to adapt the facilities to different uses, first educational, then administrative.

== Gallery ==
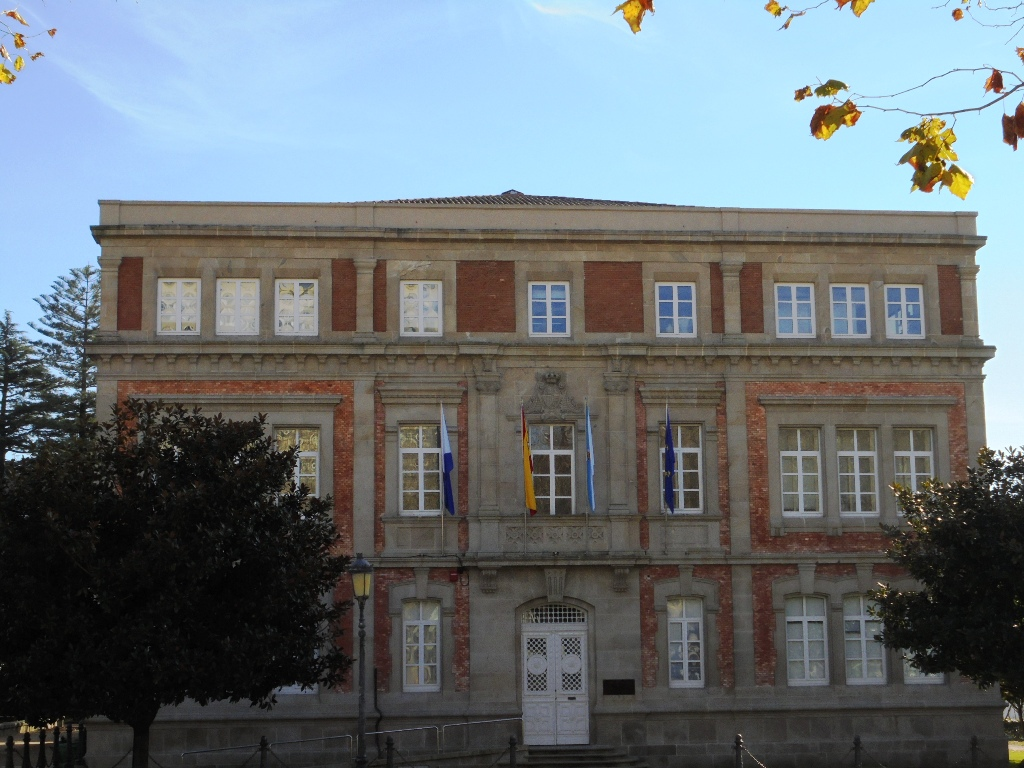
Main façade

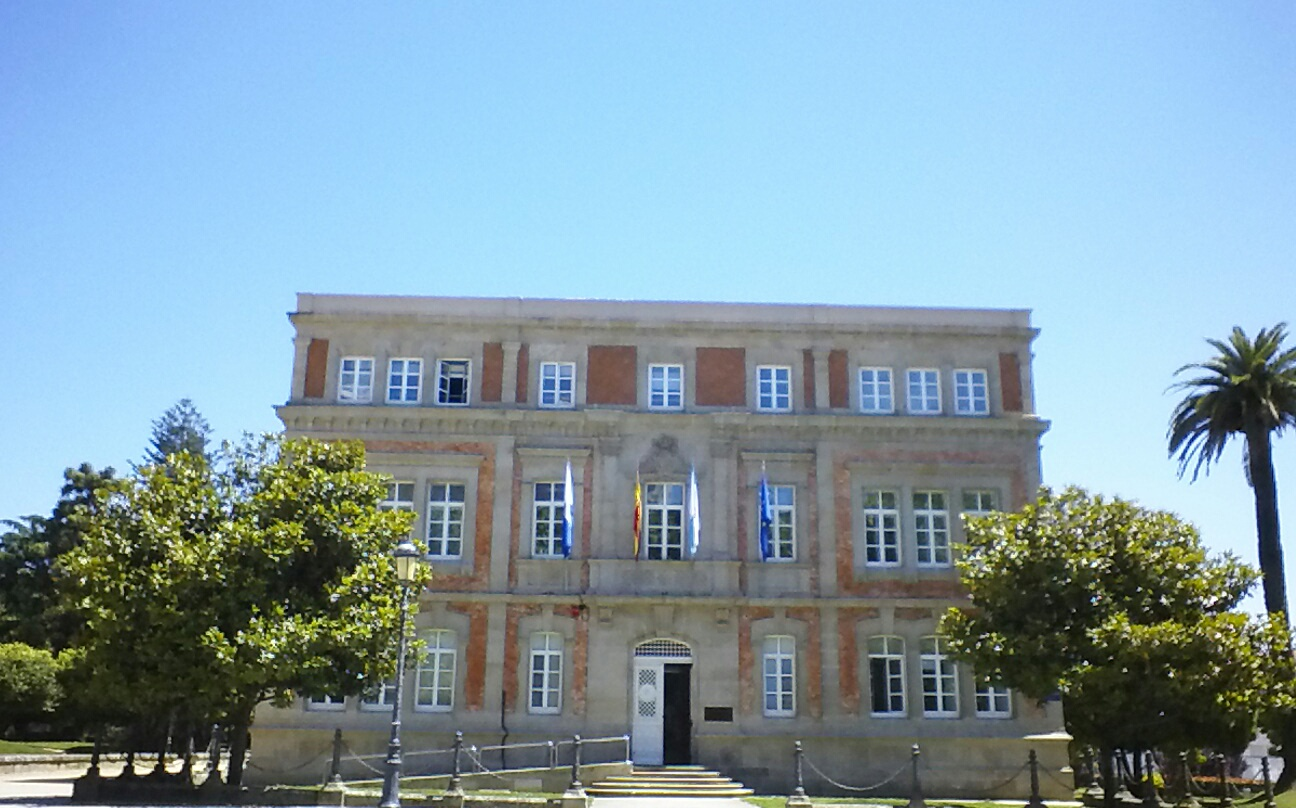
Main façade

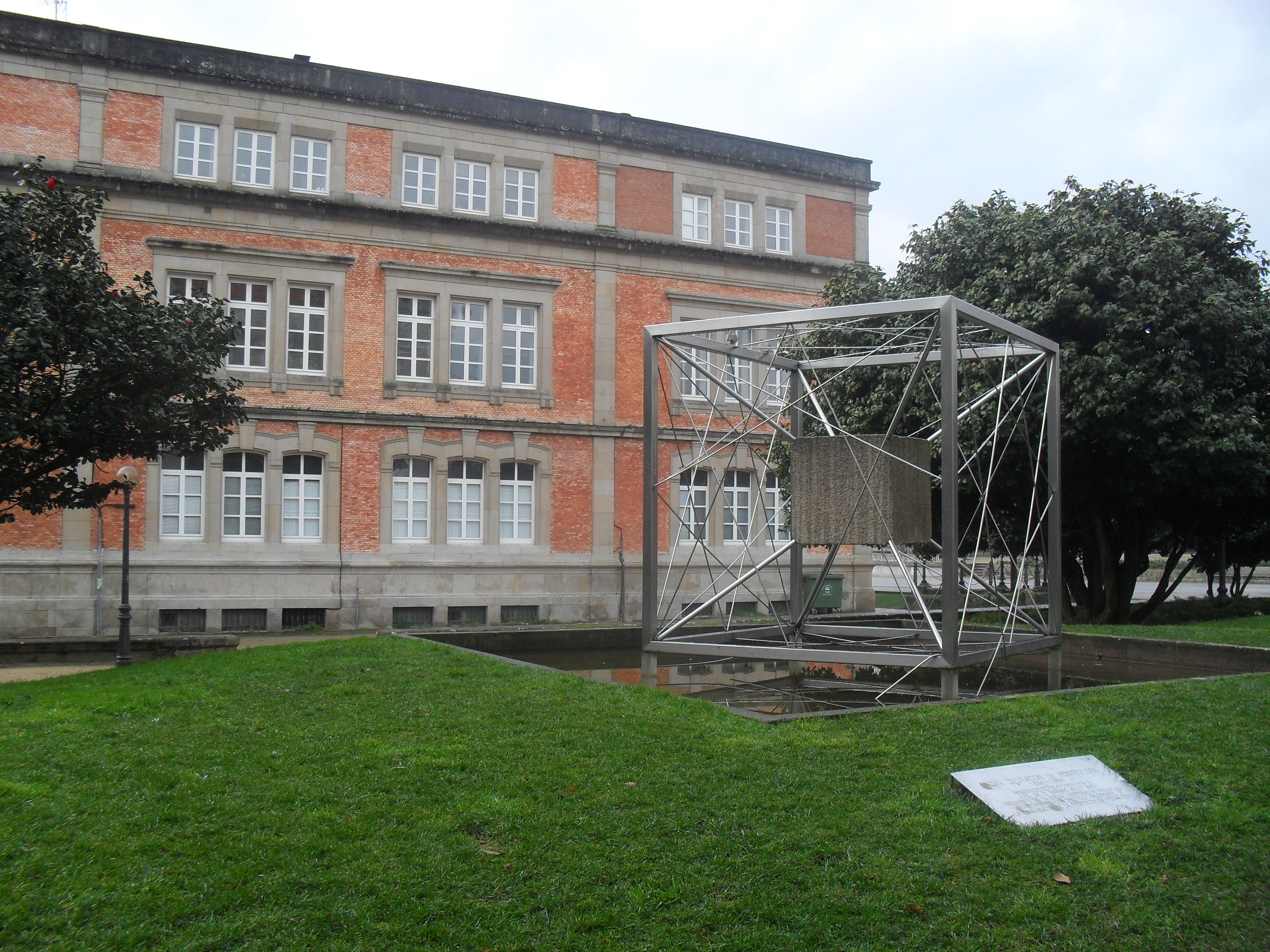
East side façade

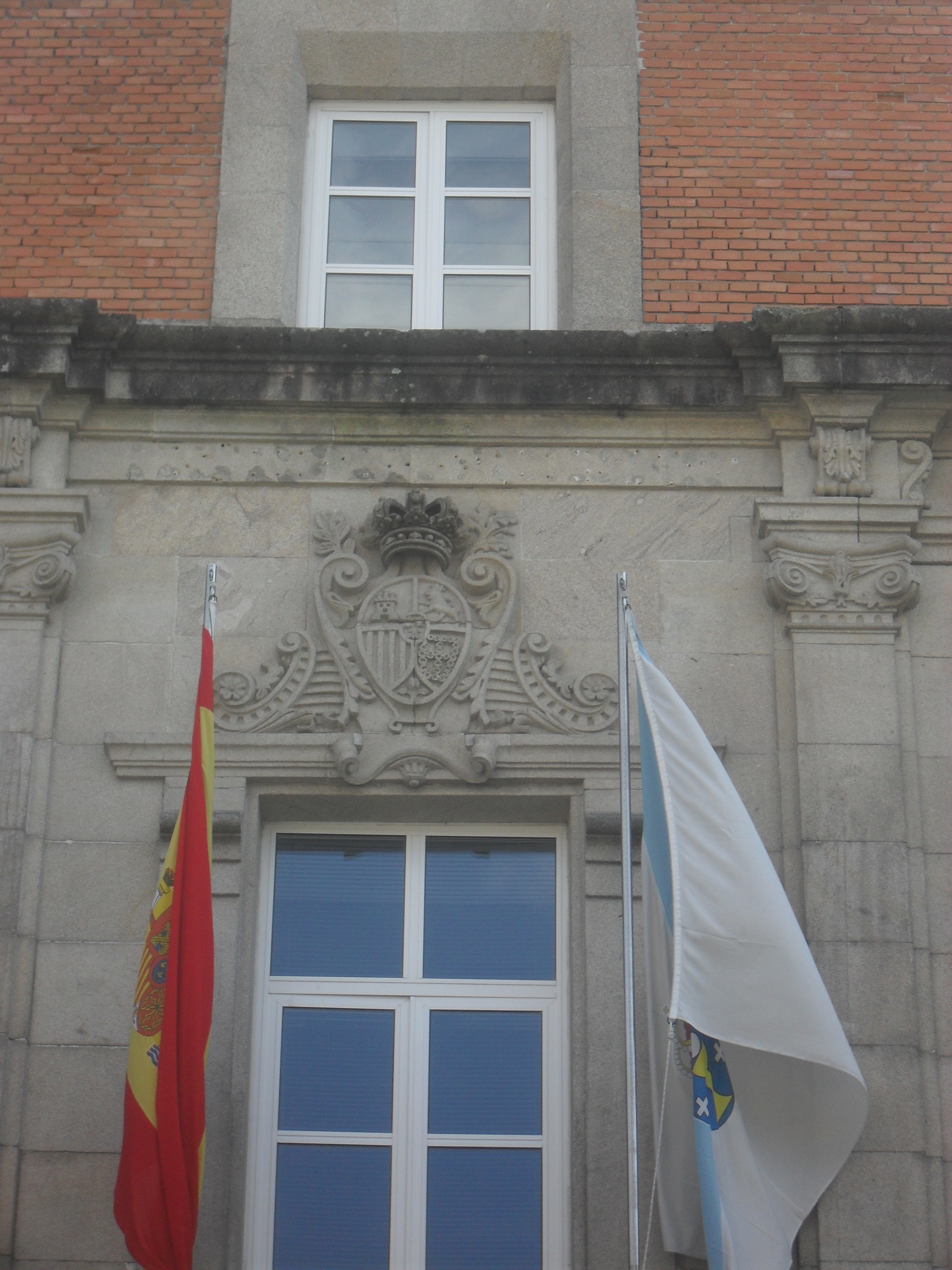
Coat of arms

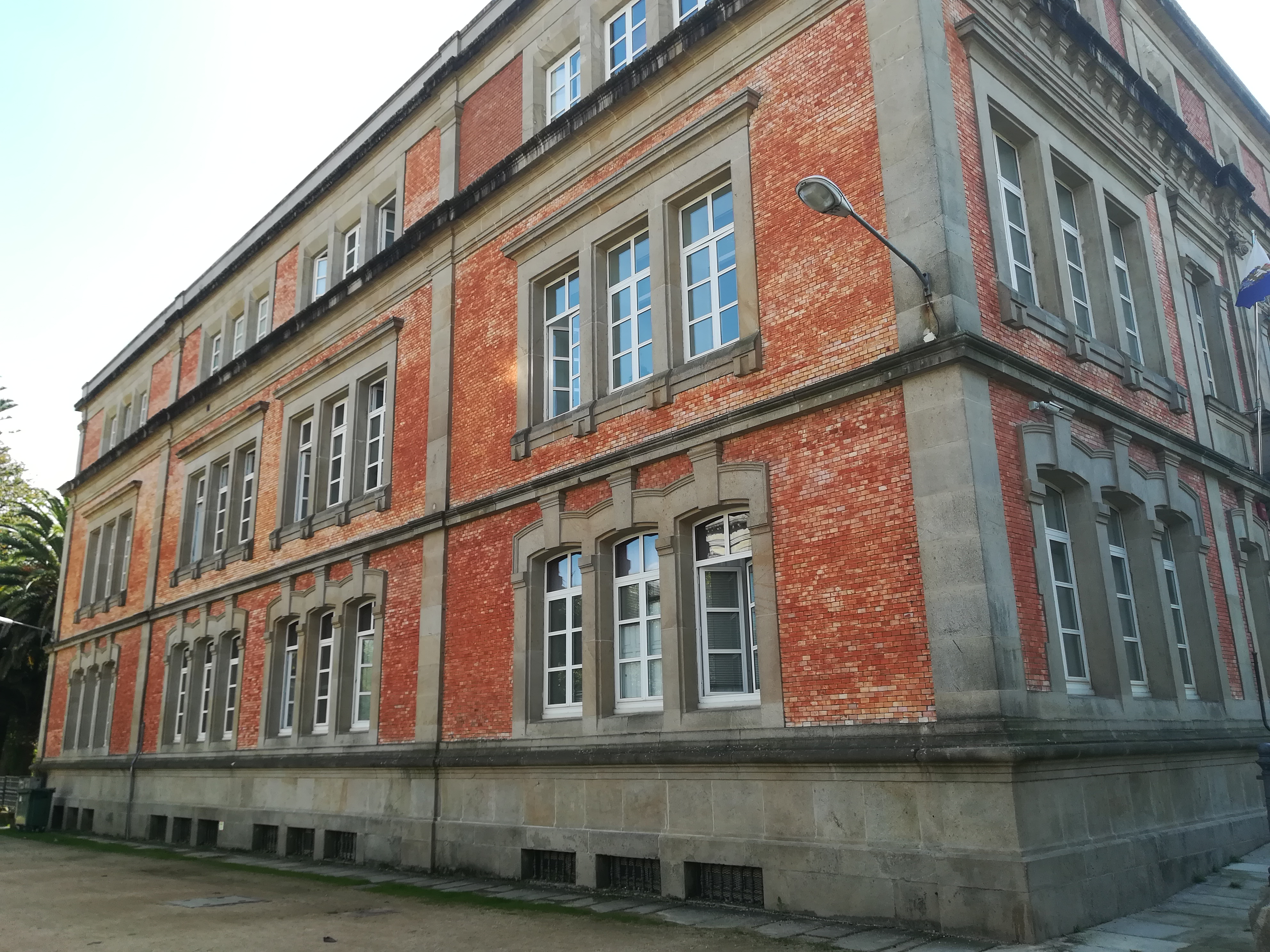
East façade

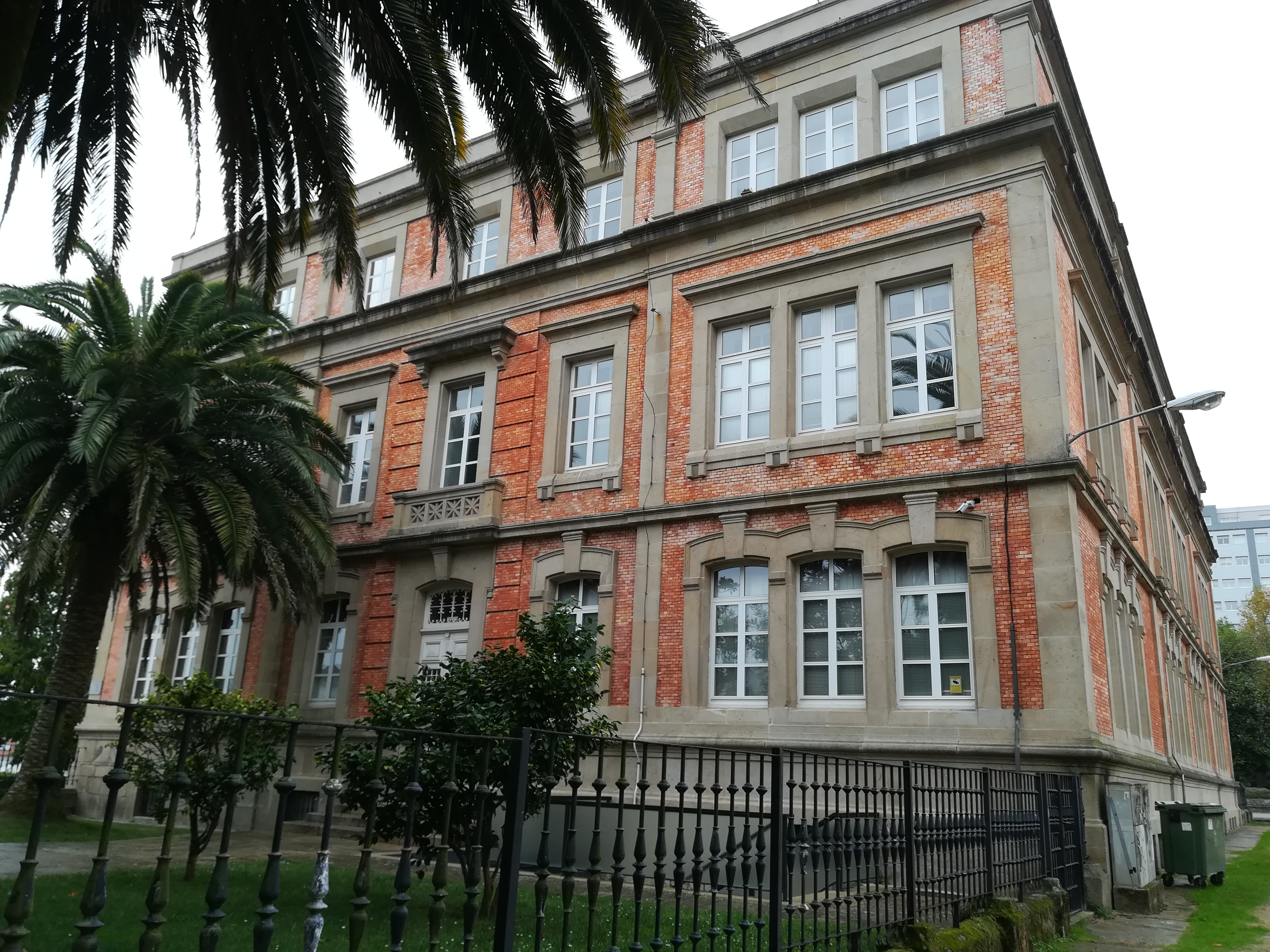
Rear façade

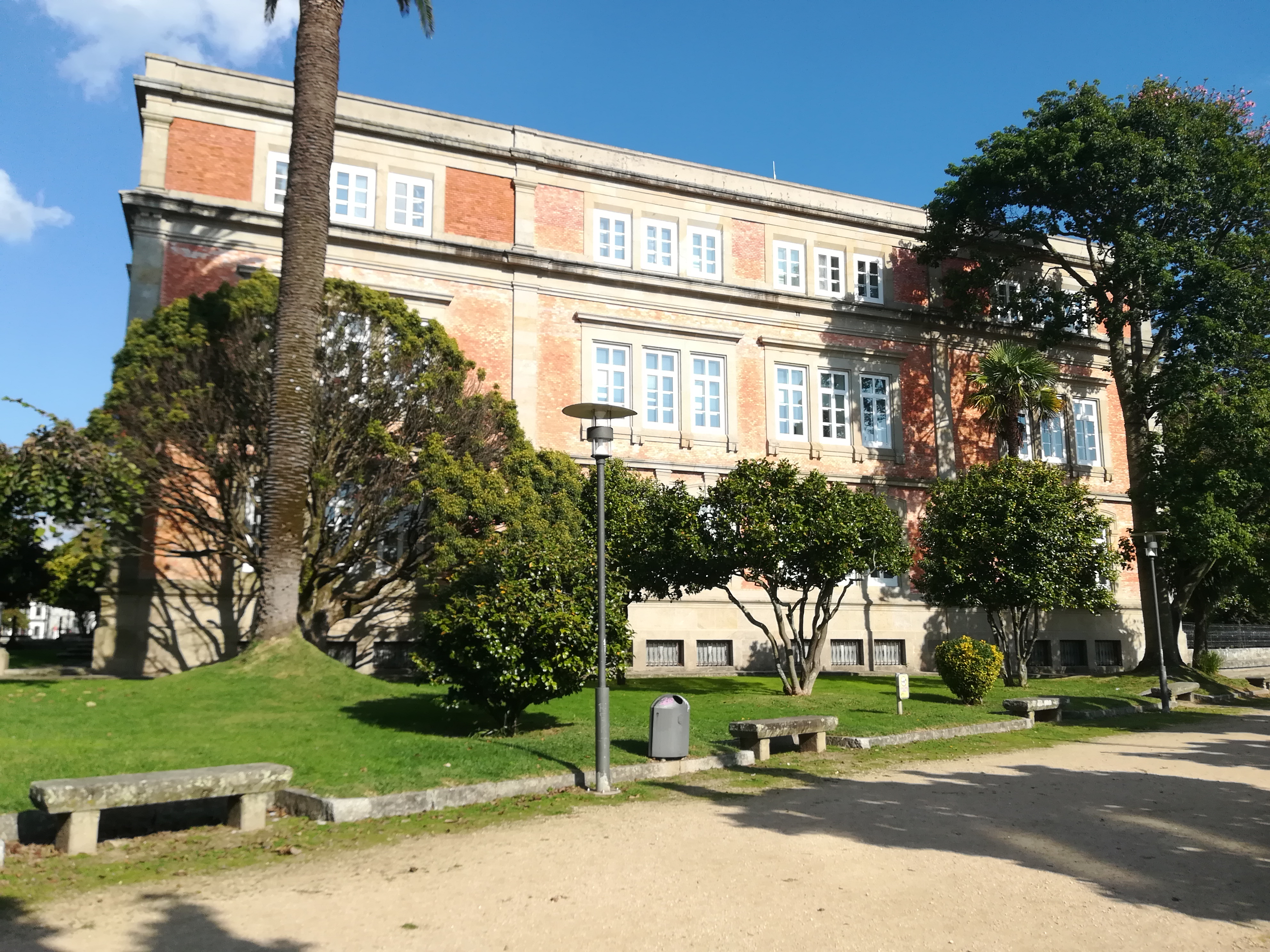
West façade

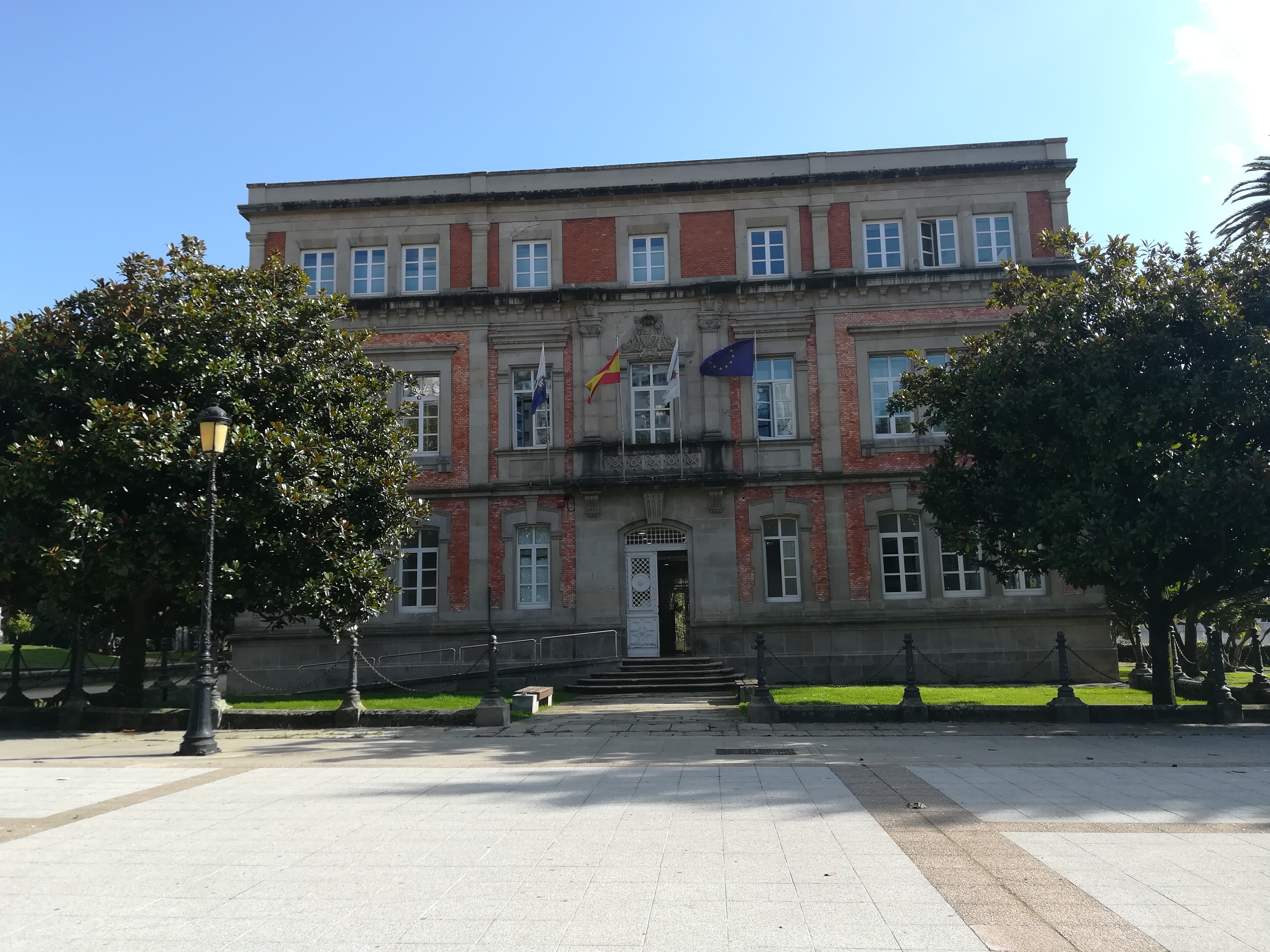
Main façade

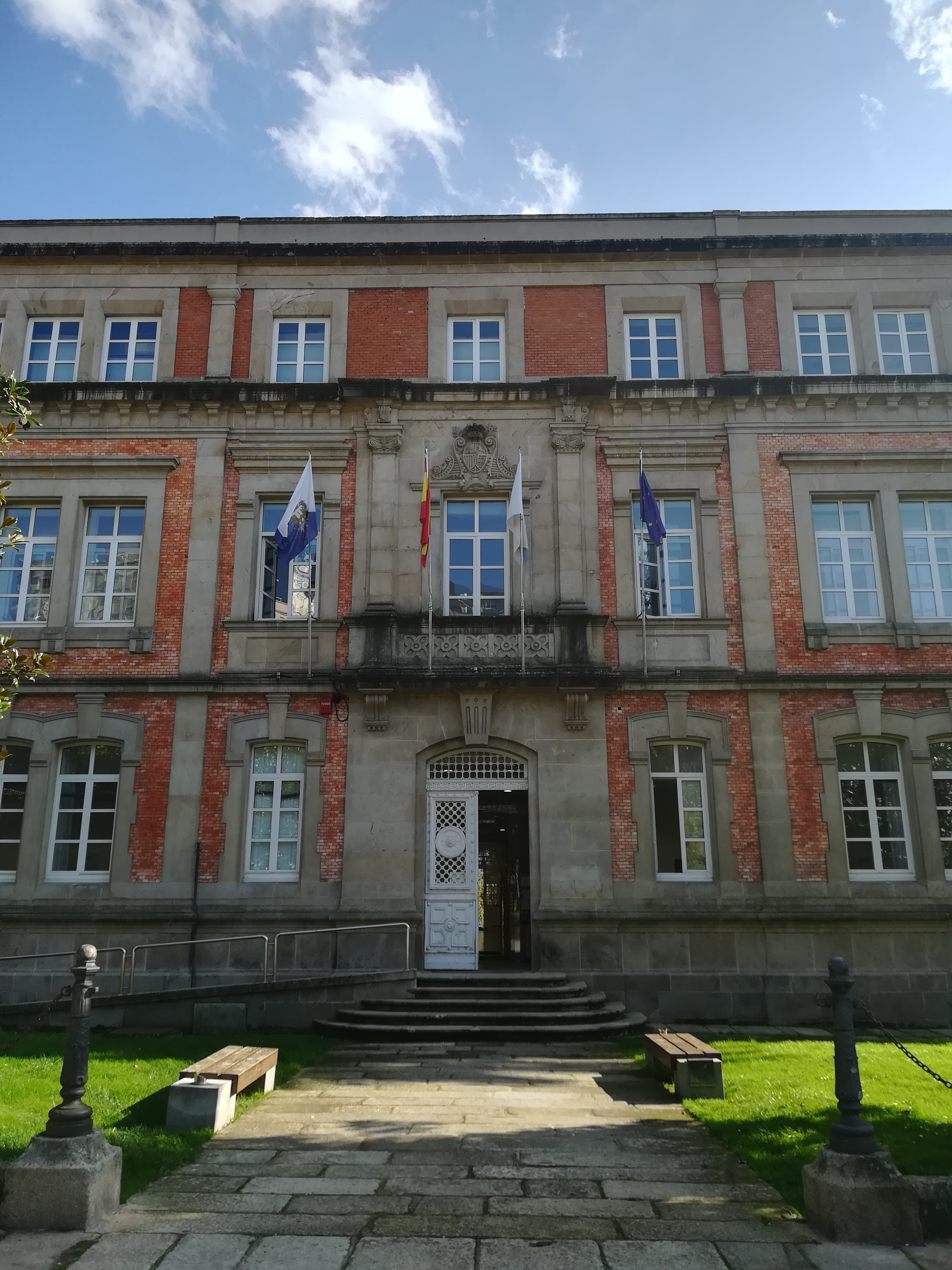
Entrance

== See also ==
=== Bibliography ===
- Aganzo, Carlos (2010). Pontevedra. Ciudades con encanto (in Spanish). Madrid: El País-Aguilar. p. 92. ISBN 978-8403509344.
- Fontoira Surís, Rafael (2009). Pontevedra monumental (in Spanish). Pontevedra: Diputación Provincial de Pontevedra. p. 425. ISBN 978-84-8457-327-2.
- Riveiro Tobío, Elvira (2008). Descubrir Pontevedra (in Spanish). Pontevedra: Edicións do Cumio. p. 48. ISBN 9788482890852.

=== Related articles ===
- Gran Vía de Montero Ríos
- Pontevedra Bullring
- Palace of the Deputation of Pontevedra
- Alameda de Pontevedra
- Valle-Inclán High School
- Mansion of the Marquis of Riestra
- Faculty of Education and Sport of Pontevedra

=== External links ===
- Deputation of Pontevedra administrative building
