= Gran Via =

Gran Via may refer to:

- Gran Vía, Madrid, street in Madrid
- Gran Vía (Madrid Metro), metro station in Madrid
- Gran Vía de Montero Ríos, street in Pontevedra
- Gran Vía de Don Diego López de Haro, street in Bilbao
- Gran Via de les Corts Catalanes, street in Barcelona
- Granvia l'Hospitalet, a major business district of Barcelona
- Gran Via Productions, a film production company founded by producer Mark Johnson
- Gran vía (song), from Quevedo's 2024 album Buenas Noches, with Aitana

La Gran Vía may also refer to:

- La Gran Vía (1886), a Spanish zarzuela
