= Gran =

Gran may refer to:

== People ==
- Grandmother, affectionately known as "gran"
- Gran (name)

== Places ==
- Gran, the historical German name for Esztergom, a city and the primatial metropolitan see of Hungary
- Gran Municipality, a municipality in Innlandet county, Norway
- Gran (village), a village in Gran Municipality in Innlandet county, Norway
- Grän, a municipality in the state of Tyrol, Austria
- Gran (island), an island in Nordanstig Municipality, Gävleborg County, Sweden

== Spanish language ==
In Spanish Gran means "Great" or "Greater", and may refer to:

- Gran Canaria, an island of the Canary Islands, Spain
- Gran Colombia, a modern name for a former South American country called Colombia
- Gran Sabana, a natural region in Venezuela
- Gran Chaco, a South American lowland natural region
- Gran Asunción (Greater Asunción), Paraguay
- Gran Chimú Province, a province of La Libertad Region of Peru
- Gran Torre Santiago, a skyscraper in Santiago, Chile
- Big Brother (franchise), called "Gran Hermano" in Hispanic countries
- La Gran Cruzada, a professional Mexican wrestling event
- Gran Campo Nevado, a small ice field in Chile
- Gran Pajatén, an archaeological site located in the Andean cloud forests of Peru

== Other ==
- Gran Brigitte, another name for Maman Brigitte
- Widely used, predominantly British, abbreviation for grandmother
- Gran (TV series), a 1983 children's animation series
- Gran plot, a graphing technique in analytical chemistry developed by Gustav Gran
- Ruth "Gran" Sims, a character in the Australian mockumentary series Angry Boys
- Gran (Star Wars), a fictional alien species in the Star Wars franchise
- Grantha script (ISO 15924 code)
- KM-8 Gran

== See also ==
- Gran Turismo (disambiguation)
- Gran Via (disambiguation)
- Grand (disambiguation)
