= Bessemer, Alabama =

City in Alabama, United States

- City
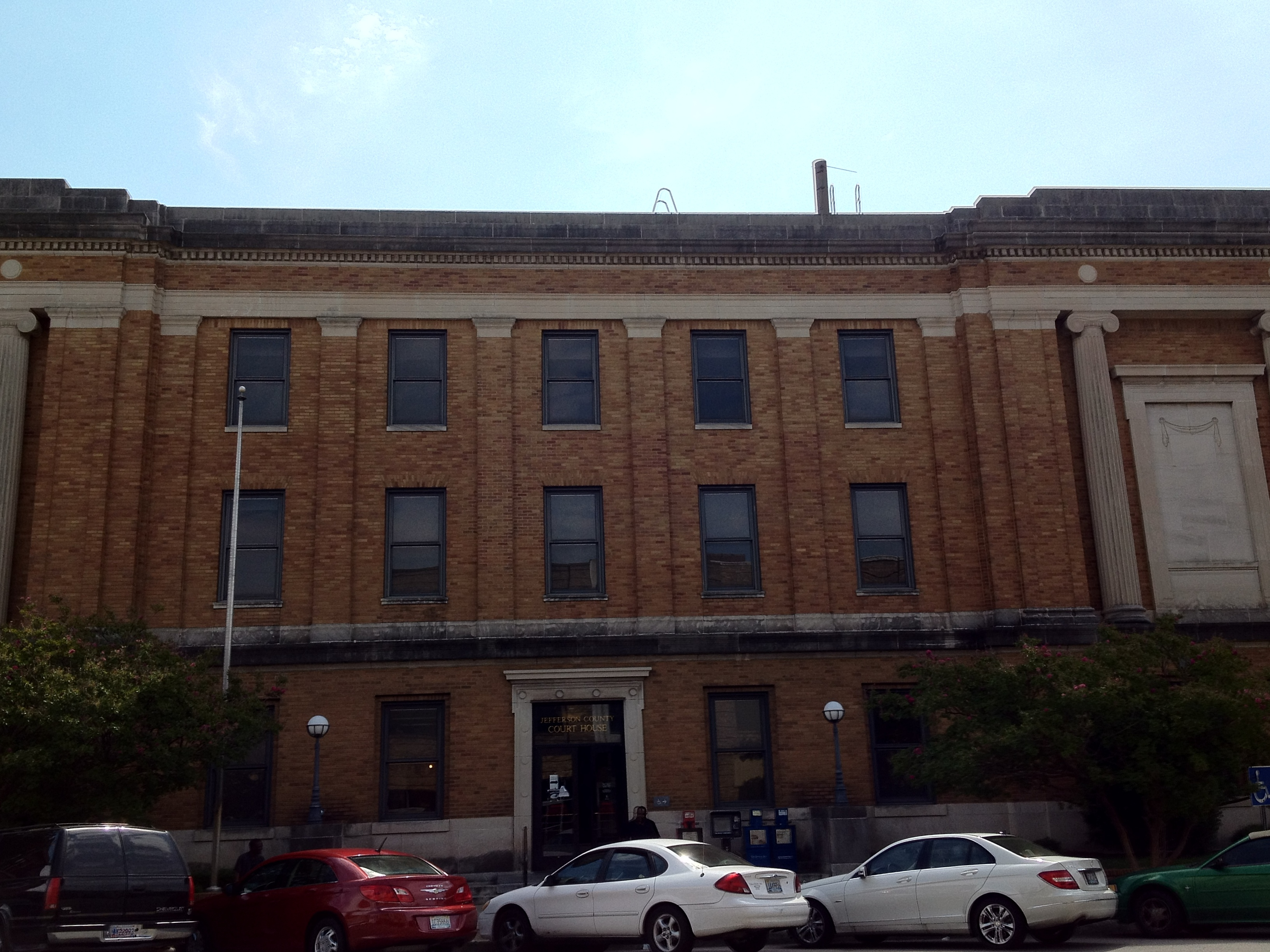
- The Jefferson County Courthouse in Bessemer

- Flag Seal
- Nickname: The Marvel City
- Location of Bessemer, Alabama
- Coordinates: 33°22′16″N 86°58′22″W
- Country: United States
- State: Alabama
- County: Jefferson
- Founded: 1886
- Incorporated: September 9, 1887
- Founder: Henry Bessemer

Government
  - Mayor: Louise Alexander
  - Council Districts: 1: Jarvis Collier; 2: Chester W Porter; 3: Cynthia S. Donald; 4: Donna Thigpen; 5: Kelvin D. Eades; 6: Valerie Williams; 7: Cleo King

Area
  - Total: 40.851 sq mi (105.804 km^{2})
  - Land: 40.639 sq mi (105.255 km^{2})
  - Water: 0.212 sq mi (0.548 km^{2}) 0.52%
- Elevation: 509 ft (155 m)

Population (2020)
  - Total: 26,019
  - Estimate (2024): 25,079
  - Density: 617.2/sq mi (238.29/km^{2})
- Time zone: UTC–6 (Central (CST))
  - Summer (DST): UTC–5 (CDT)
- ZIP Codes: 35020–35023
- Area codes: 205 and 659
- FIPS code: 01-05980
- GNIS feature ID: 2403864
- Sales tax: 10.0%
- Website: bessemeral.org

Bessemer is a city in Jefferson County, Alabama, United States and a southwestern suburb of Birmingham. The population was 26,019 at the 2020 census, and was estimated to be 25,079 in 2024. It is within the Birmingham–Hoover, AL Metropolitan statistical area, of which Jefferson County is the center. It developed rapidly as an industrial city in the late 19th and early 20th centuries.

== History ==
The town was founded in the Reconstruction Era by the Bessemer Land and Improvement Company, named after Henry Bessemer and owned by coal magnate Henry F. DeBardeleben. He had inherited Daniel Pratt's investments. The mayor and councilmen voted to incorporate the city of Bessemer on September 9, 1887. Located 15.3 miles southwest of Birmingham, Bessemer grew rapidly and its promoters believed that it might overtake the other city in economic power.

Given the iron ore, coal and limestone deposits in the area, the city became a center of steelmaking from about 1890 through the 20th century. It attracted rural migrants from across the South, as well as European immigrants. By the 1950s, the city was majority African American in population.

The steel industry went through considerable restructuring in the late 20th century, and jobs moved out of the area. Steel is no longer made there. By 2019, Bessemer was named Alabama's “Worst City to Live in.”

In 2019, it was named Alabama's "Worst City to Live in" by 24/7 Wall Street.

== Geography ==
Bessemer is located approximately 15.3 miles (24.6 km) southwest of Birmingham.

According to the United States Census Bureau, the city has a total area of 40.851 square miles (105.80 km^{2}), of which 40.639 square miles (105.25 km^{2}) is land and 0.212 square miles (0.55 km^{2}) (0.52%) is water.

Bessemer is situated in the midst of the iron ore and limestone district of Alabama, in the southern part of Jones Valley (about 3 miles (4.8 km) wide). Iron ore was mined on the hills on the city's southeast side, coal was, and still is mined to the north and west, and limestone deposits were also nearby. All three ingredients were necessary for steelmaking, which led to the area becoming a major steel center from about 1890 through the twentieth century. Steel is no longer made within the city limits but is still manufactured in the neighboring city of Fairfield.

=== Climate ===
The climate in this area is characterized by hot, humid summers and generally mild to cool winters. Bessemer has a humid subtropical climate, abbreviated "Cfa" on climate maps, within the Köppen Climate Classification system.

Climate data for Bessemer, Alabama (1991–2020 normals, extremes 1977–present)
Month	Jan	Feb	Mar	Apr	May	Jun	Jul	Aug	Sep	Oct	Nov	Dec	Year
Record high °F (°C)	79 (26)	89 (32)	90 (32)	98 (37)	102 (39)	105 (41)	108 (42)	109 (43)	103 (39)	102 (39)	90 (32)	88 (31)	109 (43)
Mean maximum °F (°C)	72.4 (22.4)	76.2 (24.6)	82.4 (28.0)	86.4 (30.2)	91.9 (33.3)	96.8 (36.0)	98.1 (36.7)	98.8 (37.1)	95.6 (35.3)	89.1 (31.7)	80.3 (26.8)	73.2 (22.9)	100.2 (37.9)
Mean daily maximum °F (°C)	55.7 (13.2)	60.6 (15.9)	68.3 (20.2)	76.0 (24.4)	83.0 (28.3)	89.1 (31.7)	91.8 (33.2)	91.7 (33.2)	87.1 (30.6)	77.1 (25.1)	66.0 (18.9)	57.9 (14.4)	75.4 (24.1)
Daily mean °F (°C)	44.8 (7.1)	48.8 (9.3)	55.8 (13.2)	63.1 (17.3)	71.2 (21.8)	77.9 (25.5)	81.2 (27.3)	80.6 (27.0)	75.4 (24.1)	64.8 (18.2)	53.8 (12.1)	47.3 (8.5)	63.7 (17.6)
Mean daily minimum °F (°C)	33.8 (1.0)	37.0 (2.8)	43.3 (6.3)	50.1 (10.1)	59.4 (15.2)	66.7 (19.3)	70.5 (21.4)	69.6 (20.9)	63.8 (17.7)	52.6 (11.4)	41.5 (5.3)	36.7 (2.6)	52.1 (11.2)
Mean minimum °F (°C)	15.7 (−9.1)	19.7 (−6.8)	25.2 (−3.8)	33.5 (0.8)	43.5 (6.4)	55.0 (12.8)	61.4 (16.3)	59.6 (15.3)	47.9 (8.8)	34.3 (1.3)	24.4 (−4.2)	20.8 (−6.2)	13.5 (−10.3)
Record low °F (°C)	−6 (−21)	3 (−16)	6 (−14)	15 (−9)	36 (2)	43 (6)	52 (11)	47 (8)	37 (3)	21 (−6)	16 (−9)	−1 (−18)	−6 (−21)
Average precipitation inches (mm)	5.40 (137)	5.38 (137)	5.42 (138)	5.11 (130)	4.55 (116)	4.53 (115)	4.76 (121)	3.98 (101)	3.45 (88)	3.26 (83)	4.45 (113)	5.20 (132)	55.49 (1,409)
Average snowfall inches (cm)	0.4 (1.0)	0.0 (0.0)	0.7 (1.8)	0.0 (0.0)	0.0 (0.0)	0.0 (0.0)	0.0 (0.0)	0.0 (0.0)	0.0 (0.0)	0.0 (0.0)	0.0 (0.0)	0.1 (0.25)	1.2 (3.0)
Average precipitation days (≥ 0.01 in)	10.4	10.7	10.9	9.3	8.5	10.5	10.9	9.9	6.4	6.7	8.2	10.8	113.2
Average snowy days (≥ 0.1 in)	0.1	0.0	0.1	0.0	0.0	0.0	0.0	0.0	0.0	0.0	0.0	0.0	0.2
Source: NOAA

== Demographics ==
Historical population
Census	Pop.	Note	%±
1890	4,544		—
1900	6,358		39.9%
1910	10,864		70.9%
1920	18,674		71.9%
1930	20,721		11.0%
1940	22,826		10.2%
1950	28,445		24.6%
1960	33,054		16.2%
1970	33,663		1.8%
1980	31,729		−5.7%
1990	33,497		5.6%
2000	29,672		−11.4%
2010	27,456		−7.5%
2020	26,019		−5.2%
2025 (est.)	24,984	▼	−4.0%
U.S. Decennial Census; 2020 Census

=== Racial and ethnic composition ===
Bessemer city, Alabama – Racial and ethnic composition Note: the US Census treats Hispanic/Latino as an ethnic category. This table excludes Latinos from the racial categories and assigns them to a separate category. Hispanics/Latinos may be of any race.
Race / Ethnicity (NH = Non-Hispanic)	Pop 1980	Pop 1990	Pop 2000	Pop 2010	Pop 2020	% 1980	% 1990	% 2000	% 2010	% 2020
White alone (NH)	15,282	13,827	8,458	6,482	4,877	48.16%	41.28%	28.50%	23.61%	18.74%
Black or African American alone (NH)	16,109	19,536	20,549	19,504	18,107	50.77%	58.32%	69.25%	71.04%	69.59%
Native American or Alaska Native alone (NH)	36	37	74	77	48	0.11%	0.11%	0.25%	0.28%	0.18%
Asian alone (NH)	11	20	50	53	68	0.03%	0.06%	0.17%	0.19%	0.26%
Native Hawaiian or Pacific Islander alone (NH)	x	x	4	0	5	x	x	0.01%	0.00%	0.02%
Other race alone (NH)	0	1	7	20	69	0.00%	0.00%	0.02%	0.07%	0.27%
Mixed race or Multiracial (NH)	x	x	192	207	540	x	x	0.65%	0.75%	2.08%
Hispanic or Latino (any race)	291	76	338	1,113	2,305	0.92%	0.23%	1.14%	4.05%	8.86%
Total	31,729	33,497	29,672	27,456	26,019	100.00%	100.00%	100.00%	100.00%	100.00%

=== 2023 American Community Survey ===
As of the 2023 American Community Survey, there are 10,598 estimated households in Bessemer with an average of 2.36 persons per household. The city has a median household income of $37,844. Approximately 30.7% of the city's population lives at or below the poverty line. Bessemer has an estimated 50.0% employment rate, with 14.4% of the population holding a bachelor's degree or higher and 86.9% holding a high school diploma.

=== Ancestry ===
The top five reported ancestries (people were allowed to report up to two ancestries, thus the figures will generally add to more than 100%) were English (92.5%), Spanish (6.8%), Indo-European (0.5%), Asian and Pacific Islander (0.1%), and Other (0.1%).

=== 2020 census ===
As of the 2020 census, Bessemer had a population of 26,019 and 10,628 households, of which 6,536 were families. The population density was 645.15 inhabitants per square mile (249.1/km^{2}). There were 12,218 housing units at an average density of 302.95 per square mile (117.0/km^{2}).

The median age was 40.4 years. 22.3% of residents were under the age of 18 and 19.0% of residents were 65 years of age or older. For every 100 females there were 86.3 males, and for every 100 females age 18 and over there were 82.4 males age 18 and over.

94.6% of residents lived in urban areas, while 5.4% lived in rural areas.

Of the 10,628 households, 28.5% had children under the age of 18 living in them. Of all households, 25.6% were married-couple households, 23.3% were households with a male householder and no spouse or partner present, and 45.9% were households with a female householder and no spouse or partner present. About 33.8% of all households were made up of individuals and 14.2% had someone living alone who was 65 years of age or older.

There were 12,218 housing units, of which 13.0% were vacant. The homeowner vacancy rate was 2.1% and the rental vacancy rate was 8.6%.

=== 2010 census ===
As of the 2010 census, there were 27,456 people, 10,711 households, and _ families residing in the city. The population density was 688.98 inhabitants per square mile (266.0/km^{2}). There were 12,369 housing units at an average density of 310.39 per square mile (119.8/km^{2}). The racial makeup of the city was 24.29% White, 71.19% African American, 0.32% Native American, 0.19% Asian, 0.00% Pacific Islander, 3.13% from some other races and 0.88% from two or more races. Hispanic or Latino people of any race were 4.05% of the population.

=== 2000 census ===
As of the 2000 census, there were 29,672 people, 11,537 households, and 7,868 families residing in the city. The population density was 729.04 inhabitants per square mile (281.5/km^{2}). There were 12,790 housing units at an average density of 314.25 per square mile (121.3/km^{2}). The racial makeup of the city was 28.93% White, 69.55% African American, 0.28% Native American, 0.18% Asian, 0.02% Pacific Islander, 0.30% from some other races and 0.74% from two or more races. Hispanic or Latino people of any race were 1.14% of the population.

There were 11,537 households, out of which 30.5% had children under the age of 18 living with them, 34.6% were married couples living together, 29.2% had a female householder with no husband present, and 31.8% were non-families. 29.0% of all households were made up of individuals, and 13.0% had someone living alone who was 65 years of age or older. The average household size was 2.52 and the average family size was 3.12.

In the city, the population was spread out, with 26.8% under the age of 18, 9.6% from 18 to 24, 26.1% from 25 to 44, 21.1% from 45 to 64, and 16.4% who were 65 years of age or older. The median age was 36 years. For every 100 females, there were 82.9 males. For every 100 females age 18 and over, there were 75.8 males.

The median income for a household in the city was $23,066, and the median income for a family was $28,230. Males had a median income of $29,413 versus $21,552 for females. The per capita income for the city was $12,232. About 24.2% of families and 27.2% of the population were below the poverty line, including 37.8% of those under age 18 and 24.7% of those age 65 or over.

== Economy ==
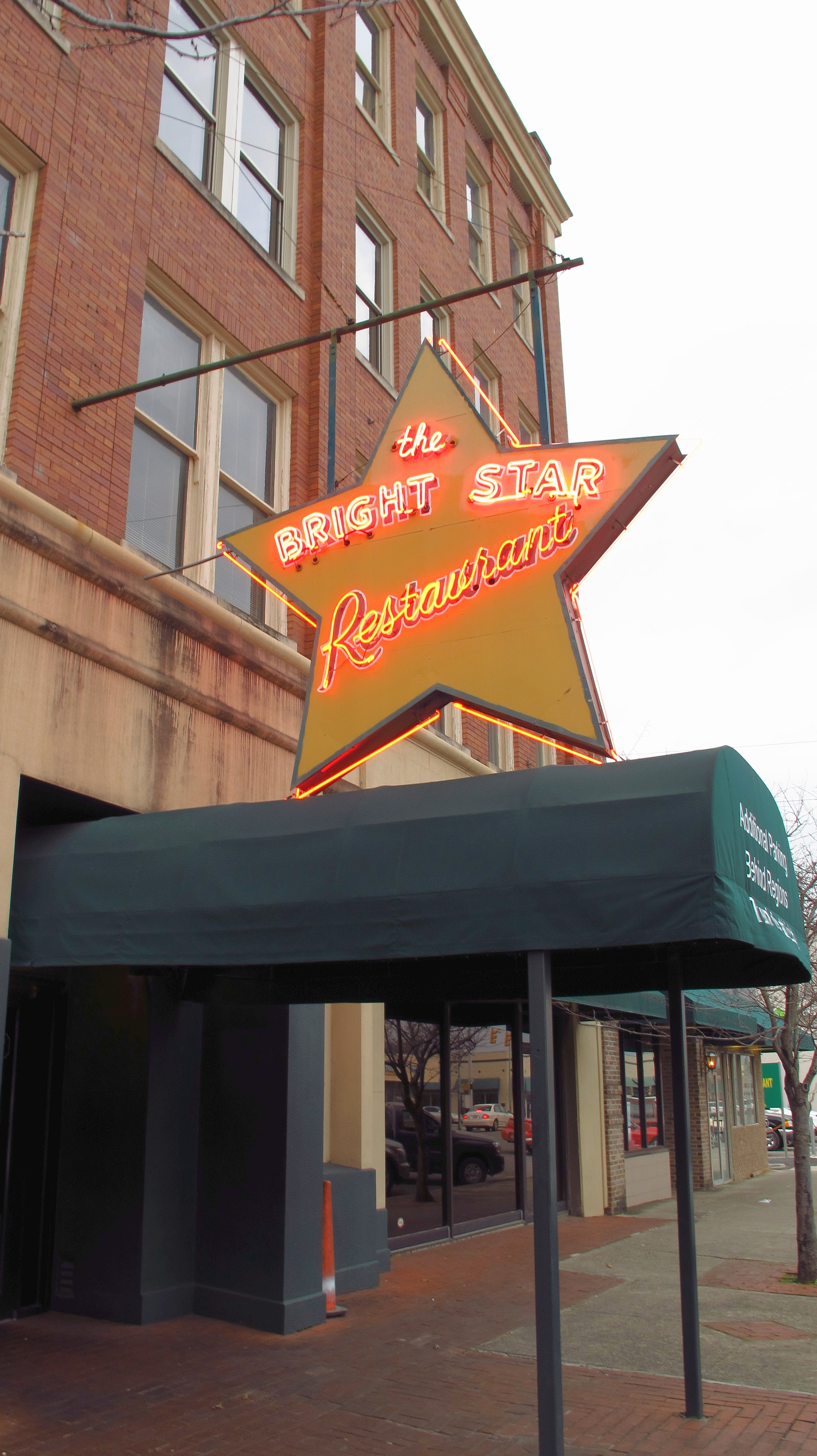
The Bright Star in Bessemer is Alabama's oldest restaurant

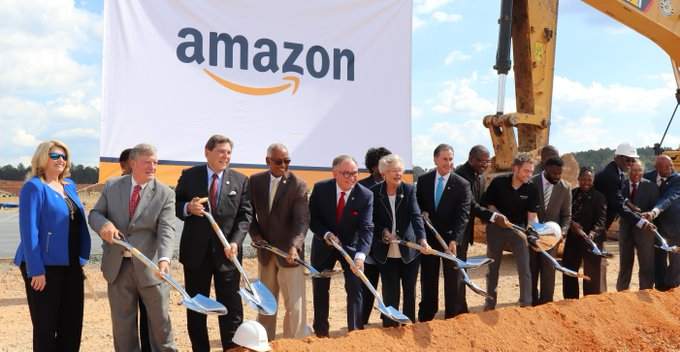
The groundbreaking of the Amazon fulfillment center in Bessemer in 2018.

In 1900, Bessemer ranked eighth in the population in Alabama, second in the amount of capital invested in manufacturing, and fourth in the value of its manufactured product for the year. By 1911, ore mining, iron smelting, and the manufacture of iron and coke were the chief industries of Bessemer. Truck farming was an important industry, dating from the area's agricultural past.

Both blacks and whites from rural areas were attracted to the city for its new work opportunities. Gradually African Americans moved into industrial jobs and became part of integrated unions. Such jobs enabled many working-class families to enjoy middle-class incomes.

Today, ore mining has ended, as supplies were exhausted. Manufacturing remains a factor, with the U.S. Pipe and Foundry ductile pipe plant on the city's north side. In May 2007, U.S. Pipe announced that it would be building a new $45-million foundry near the current plant. The site was selected, among other reasons, for having available space for potential future expansions. U.S. Pipe is the largest domestic producer of ductile iron pipe in sizes 4 inch through 64 inch.

Bessemer was once home to a large railroad car manufacturing factory, operated by Pullman Standard for many decades and later by Trinity Industries. With railroad restructuring in the late 20th century and other manufacturing moving offshore, this plant ceased most production in the 1990s. In 2012, BLOX LLC (bloxbuilt.com) a manufacturer of modular components for healthcare facilities moved into this facility.

The decline of mining and exodus of the steelmaking and railcar manufacturing industries resulted in extensive loss of jobs. Bessemer has lost population since a peak population in 1970. It faced an economic crisis in the early to mid-1980s, as unemployed workers constituted more than one-third of the workforce. Since that time the city has been successful in diversifying its economy, through the efforts of the Bessemer Area Chamber of Commerce and the Bessemer Industrial Development Board. It is recognized for its business growth. In June 2018, Amazon announced that it would build a new 800,000 square feet (74,000 m^{2}), $325 million fulfillment center in Bessemer, which will initially create 1,500 new jobs.

== Crime ==
Bessemer
- Crime rates* (2023)

Violent crimes
- Homicide: 16
- Rape: 14
- Robbery: 121
- Aggravated assault: 503
- Total violent crime: 654

Property crimes
- Burglary: 289
- Larceny-theft: 1,818
- Motor vehicle theft: 266
- Arson: 8
- Total property crime: 2,381
- Note: Reported crimes per 100,000 population Source: 2023 FBI UCR Data

According to the Uniform Crime Report statistics compiled by the Federal Bureau of Investigation (FBI) in 2023, there were 654 violent crimes and 2,381 property crimes per 100,000 residents. Of these, the violent crimes consisted of 16 murders, 14 forcible rapes, 121 robberies and 503 aggravated assaults, while 289 burglaries, 1,818 larceny-thefts, 266 motor vehicle thefts and 8 acts of arson defined the property offenses.

According to the NeighborhoodScout, Bessemer ranks first in terms of violent crimes for U.S. cities with 25,000 or more people as of 2019.

== Arts and culture ==
The performance center Bessemer Civic Center provides multiple performance spaces for music and theatre.

== Government ==
Bessemer uses the mayor–city council form of government. The mayor is elected at-large while the seven members of the council are elected to represent single-member districts. Four-term incumbent mayor Kenneth Gulley lost his seat to challenger Louise Alexander in the city's 2026 municipal election runoff.

A satellite Jefferson County Courthouse is located in downtown Bessemer. There is a special county government district, known as the "Bessemer Cutoff", which was established in the middle of the 20th century when Bessemer was a major city in its own right. A separate county government was considered a possibility, but there was not sufficient land area to meet legislative requirements for a county. The "Cutoff" had a separate series of Alabama license plates, with a different numeric prefix than the rest of the county.

Bessemer has since been surpassed in size by Birmingham suburbs such as Hoover, Vestavia Hills, and Homewood. But Bessemer retains the branch county courthouse to this day. The term "Bessemer Cutoff" continues to be used regularly by area residents.

The United States Postal Service operates the Bessemer Post Office.

The state Alabama Department of Corrections operates the William E. Donaldson Correctional Facility, a prison for men, in unincorporated Jefferson County, Alabama, near Bessemer. The prison includes one of the two Alabama death rows for men.

== Education ==
=== Public schools ===
Bessemer has its own school system independent of Jefferson County Schools, Bessemer City Schools. The system includes:

- Hard Elementary
- Jonesboro Elementary
- Greenwood Elementary
- Abrams Elementary
- Westhills Elementary
- Bessemer City Middle
- Bessemer City High School (formerly Jess Lanier)

The Board of Education also operates the Quitman Mitchell Opportunity Center, which includes an adult learning center, Even Start child care center, and New Horizon Alternative School.

=== Private schools ===
K–12 private schools in the Bessemer include Rock Christian School and Bessemer Academy, which was founded as a segregation academy.

=== Community college ===
Lawson State Community College operates the former Bessemer Technical College campus. The two schools merged in 2005 as a cost-saving measure.

== Media ==
The Western Star is a weekly newspaper which covers Bessemer and nearby communities.

The Birmingham News is published three days per week, and also publishes a weekly section devoted to news from Bessemer and nearby communities.

One radio station, WZGX (1450 AM), operates within the city; it broadcasts some Spanish-language programming and music to appeal to the growing Mexican-American population of Jefferson County. It also continues a tradition of broadcasting high school football games on Friday nights. All of metro Birmingham's stations are heard in Bessemer, as well as several stations broadcasting from Tuscaloosa.

Television station WDBB (channel 17) is licensed to Bessemer, but broadcasts from studios in Birmingham, simulcasting with WTTO (channel 21). All of Birmingham's television stations may be viewed in Bessemer, and some have established news bureaus there.

== Infrastructure ==
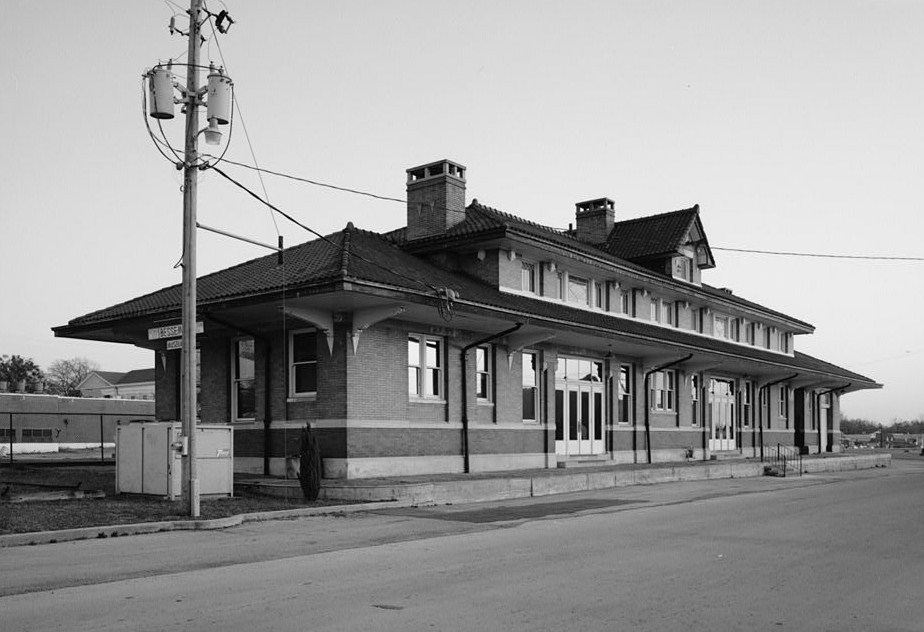
The Southern Railway depot in Bessemer, built in 1905

=== Transportation ===
In 1911, the town was served by five railroad lines: Alabama Great Southern (Queen & Crescent route), the Louisville & Nashville Railroad, the Kansas City, Memphis & Birmingham (St. Louis & San Francisco Railroad system), the Birmingham Southern Railroad, and the Atlanta, Birmingham and Atlantic Railways. Passenger service decreased after people started choosing to travel by automobiles, increasingly so after World War II. In addition, there was widespread restructuring in the railroad industry that also applied to freight lines.

By 2006, the companies listed above had consolidated into CSX Transportation, which has lines to Birmingham and Brookwood, and the Norfolk Southern Railway, with lines to Birmingham, Mobile and New Orleans. Birmingham Southern continues in service. A major railroad feature is the "High Line", constructed by Tennessee Coal & Iron (predecessor to U.S. Steel) to ship iron ore from the mines on the city's south side to the steel works in nearby Fairfield. This elevated line traverses the eastern side of the city. Though tracks were removed over much of the High Line when the mines closed, part of the line is still used by the Birmingham Southern. All of the roadbed and bridges remain in place.

Transit service in Bessemer is provided by Birmingham-Jefferson County Transit Authority, which operates Max Transit bus service.

Bessemer is served by the small Bessemer Airport to the southeast of the city. Commercial service in the region is provided by the much larger Birmingham-Shuttlesworth International Airport, located 5 miles (8.0 km) north of Birmingham, about 21 miles away in total.

Major highways in Bessemer include I-20/59, I-459, US 11, and SR 150, which connects Bessemer with Hoover.

== Notable people ==
- David Bonnett, NASCAR driver
- Neil Bonnett, NASCAR driver
- McKinley Boykin, professional football player
- Alex Bradford, composer, singer, arranger, and choir director
- Mildred Brown, journalist
- David L. DeJarnette, archaeologist, generally considered the "Father of Alabama Archaeology"
- Thornton Dial, African-American folk artist
- Nelsan Ellis, actor and playwright
- Anthony Henton, former NFL linebacker
- Mike Hill, Broadcaster, ESPN/Fox Sports and other national outlets
- Virginia Hill, actress, mob courier and girlfriend of Bugsy Siegel
- Andre Holland, actor
- Frank House, born in Bessemer, major league baseball player
- Bo Jackson, Heisman Trophy winner, NFL and MLB player
- Lamar Johnson, former MLB first baseman
- Eddie LeVert, singer
- Gucci Mane, rapper
- Reese McCall, former NFL tight end
- David McCampbell, Medal of Honor recipient, and the US Navy's all-time leading ace with 34 aerial victories during World War II.
- Edward McClain, Alabama state legislator
- Deborah E. McDowell, English professor and author of a 1997 memoir of life in Bessemer, Leaving Pipe Shop
- Elijah Nevett, NFL player
- Kerry Rhodes, NFL player
- Curtis Rowe, professional basketball player
- DeMeco Ryans, NFL player and head coach
- Glenn Shadix, born in Bessemer, actor
- John Paul Thomas, artist, educator and scholar; born in Bessemer
- Ontario Tillman, member of the Alabama House of Representatives born in Bessemer and resident
- Olanda Truitt, NFL player
- Larry Watkins, former NFL running back
- Jack Whitten, abstract painter
- Andre Williams, singer and producer
- Gran Wilson, opera singer
- Rod Windsor, NFL player
- Jameis Winston, Heisman Trophy winner, quarterback for the New York Football Giants

== Notable animal ==
- Matilda (chicken), Guinness World Record holder

== See also ==
- SS Bessemer Victory – World War II cargo ship named for Bessemer
- Bessemer union drive - unionization movement of workers at Amazon
