= Louise Alexander (politician) =

American politician (born 1960)

Member of the Alabama House of Representatives from the 56th district
- In office November 5, 2014 – November 9, 2022
- Preceded by: Lawrence McAdory
- Succeeded by: Ontario Tillman

Personal details
- Born: April 4, 1960 (age 66) Bessemer, Alabama, U.S.
- Party: Democratic
- Profession: Business owner

Louise Alexander (born April 4, 1960) is an American politician who served in the Alabama House of Representatives from the 56th district from 2014 to 2022. In 2026, she was elected Mayor of Bessemer, Alabama.
