= Gran Wilson =

American tenor

Gran Wilson is an American operatic lyric tenor.

Wilson was born in Bessemer, Alabama, and studied at Samford University and Indiana University School of Music.

He has appeared with the New York City Opera (La fille du régiment, Die Zauberflöte, and Die lustige Witwe), Opéra de Nice, The Netherlands Opera, Teatro São Carlos, Michigan Opera Theatre, Opera Theatre of Saint Louis, Flemish Opera, Opéra de Toulon, Athens Opera, Central City Opera, Oper Frankfurt, Opera/Columbus, Knoxville Opera Company, Edmonton Opera, Opera Company of Philadelphia, and Glimmerglass Opera. For the Houston Grand Opera, and Lincoln Center and Edinburgh Festivals, he sang in Robert Wilson's production of Four Saints in Three Acts. Wilson sang L'elisir d'amore, La fille du régiment, Roméo et Juliette, Don Giovanni, Werther, Manon, and Lucia di Lammermoor (with Elizabeth Futral) with the New Orleans Opera Association.

Wilson has recorded Pulcinella (under Gerard Schwarz), and his Tamino in Die Zauberflöte (conducted by Richard Bonynge and directed by Göran Järvefelt) was filmed. As of 2011, he is on the faculty of the Department of Music at Towson University.
