= Julia Gran =

Julia Gran is an American graphic designer and children's book illustrator.

Gran was born in New York City. She attended the High School of Art and Design, where she majored in animation. She graduated from Parsons School of Design.

She then worked as a designer and art director for a variety of design studios and book and magazine publishers. Working in the tradition of her influences Paul Rand and Saul Bass, Julia has combined her designer's eye and whimsical illustration style. She has created brands for clients ranging from fashion and food to institutional. She has also worked as a faculty member at Marymount Manhattan College.

Gran is a noted illustrator of children's picture books. Those she has illustrated include Princess Penelope and Princess Penelope Takes Charge; she wrote and illustrated Big Bug Surprise. She has won awards including a Distinguished Achievement Award from the Educational Press Association of America (now the Association of Educational Publishers) for 321 Contact.
