= Øyulv Gran =

Norwegian writer (1902–1972)

Øyulv Gran (1902–1972) was a Norwegian writer. His genres were crime and romance.

Øyulv Gran frequently wrote under various pseudonyms including: Øivind / Øyvind Grundt, Brynjulf Bagge, Alf Ottar Karlsrud Rakstad, and Stein Winge. He is most associated with the stories he wrote which appeared in the magazine Detektiv-Magasinet about the fictional Oslo detective Knut Gribb. In 1908, Norwegian and author Sven Elvestad had created the fictional police detective Knut Gribb. The character was taken over by several other writers in various magazines and series of paperbacks. Starting in the 1970s, increasingly Øyulv Gran's presentation formed the basis for public perception of Knut Gribb .

Many of his stories were published as books as well, including Svindler-syndikatet (1972), Mannen bak masken (1976) and Nattens konge (1985).

The writings of Gran was clearly antisemitic and anti-Communist, and he also wrote about the perceived Yellow Peril. During the Occupation of Norway by Nazi Germany, Gran's writings did not really reflect Nazi propaganda. Still, Gran was an active Nazi for some time.
