= Gran Vía de Montero Ríos =

Avenue in Pontevedra, Spain

Gran Vía de Montero Ríos Avenue
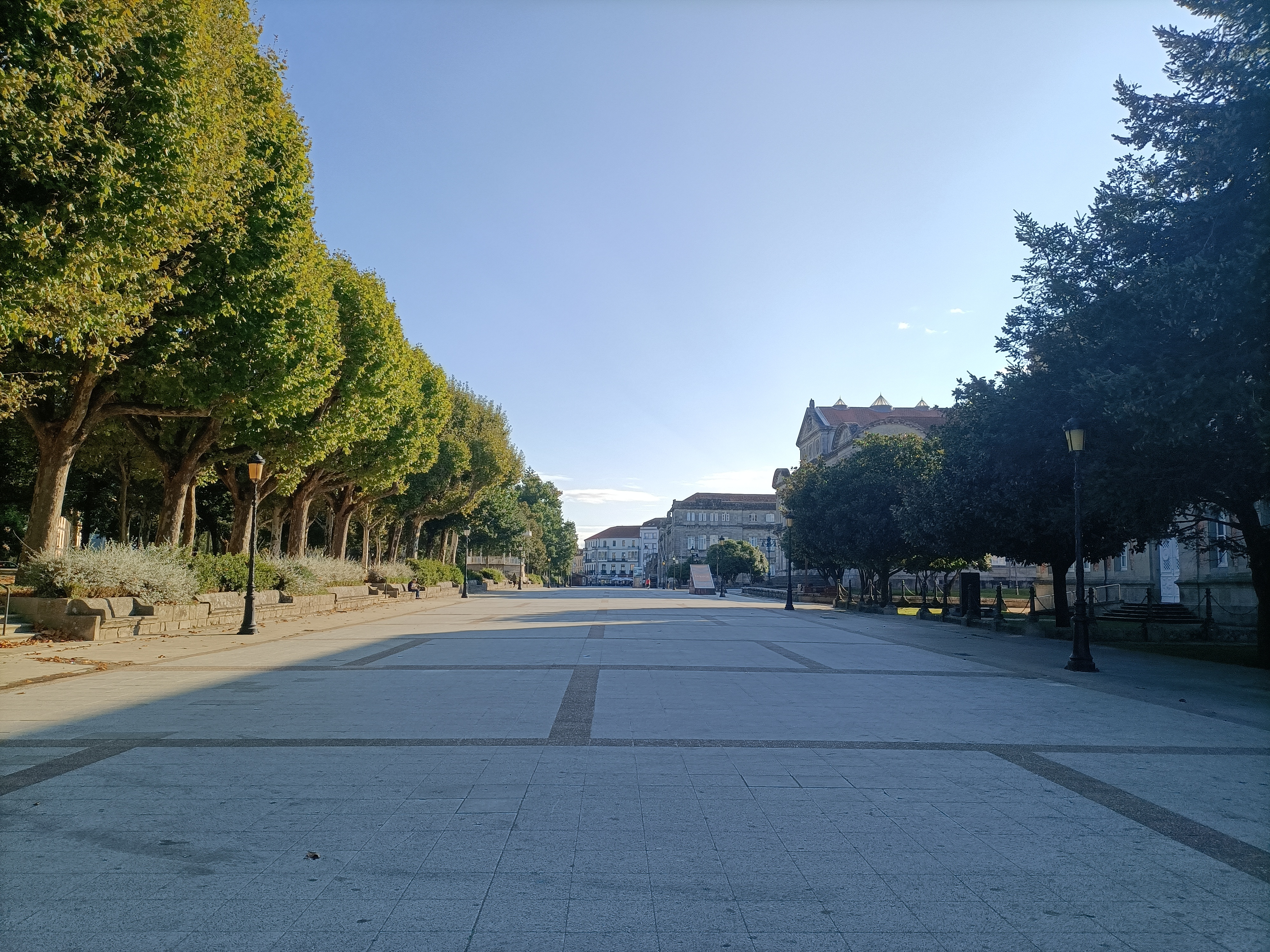
- Gran Vía de Montero Ríos, pedestrian zone
- Native name: Gran Vía de Montero Ríos (Spanish)
- Type: Avenue
- Maintained by: Pontevedra City Council
- Location: Pontevedra, Spain
- Postal code: 36001
- Coordinates: 42.430667°N 8.648361°W

The Gran Vía de Montero Ríos is an avenue in Pontevedra (Spain) located in the city centre, in the 19th century bourgeois area. It is one of the most emblematic avenues in Pontevedra.

== Origin of the name ==
The avenue was called Gran Vía (major thoroughfare) because it was the widest in the city when it was created. After his death in 1914, the avenue was dedicated to Eugenio Montero Ríos, for his great political activity in favour of Pontevedra.

== History ==
The Gran Vía de Montero Ríos, originally known as the Gran Vía, was designed in the 1870s to connect the Alameda de Pontevedra with the grounds of the old fairground. Its design was included in the project commissioned by the City Council in 1880 by the architect Alejandro Sesmero for the planning and development of the Alameda.

In 1884, the Provincial Council of Pontevedra bought from the City Council of Pontevedra the land where the Palace of the Deputation of Pontevedra is located. The palace was designed by Alejandro Sesmero and his father Domingo Sesmero. Work began on 1 March 1884 and lasted until 8 November 1890.

Also in the 1880s, the Pontevedra City Council bought the property located further west of the Gran Vía from the Munaiz family, a plot of land that was still empty, in order to construct a building for the new School of Arts and Crafts. The building was designed by the architect Arturo Calvo Tomelén, who took charge of the project in 1895. The building was inaugurated in 1901.

In 1905, the construction of the new building of the Provincial High School of Pontevedra began next to the ruins of the San Domingo Convent. The building, designed by the architects Joaquín Rojí López-Calvo and José Lorite Kramer, was completed at the beginning of 1926, with more delay than expected due to the economic crisis. The school was inaugurated on 27 September 1927 by King Alfonso XIII during a visit to Pontevedra.

In August 1941, the Pontevedra City Council ceded a plot of land at the end of the Gran Vía to the Francoist government for the construction of a monument to the memory of the soldiers who died for their country. A large cross was built, in the style of those erected at the same time throughout Spain.

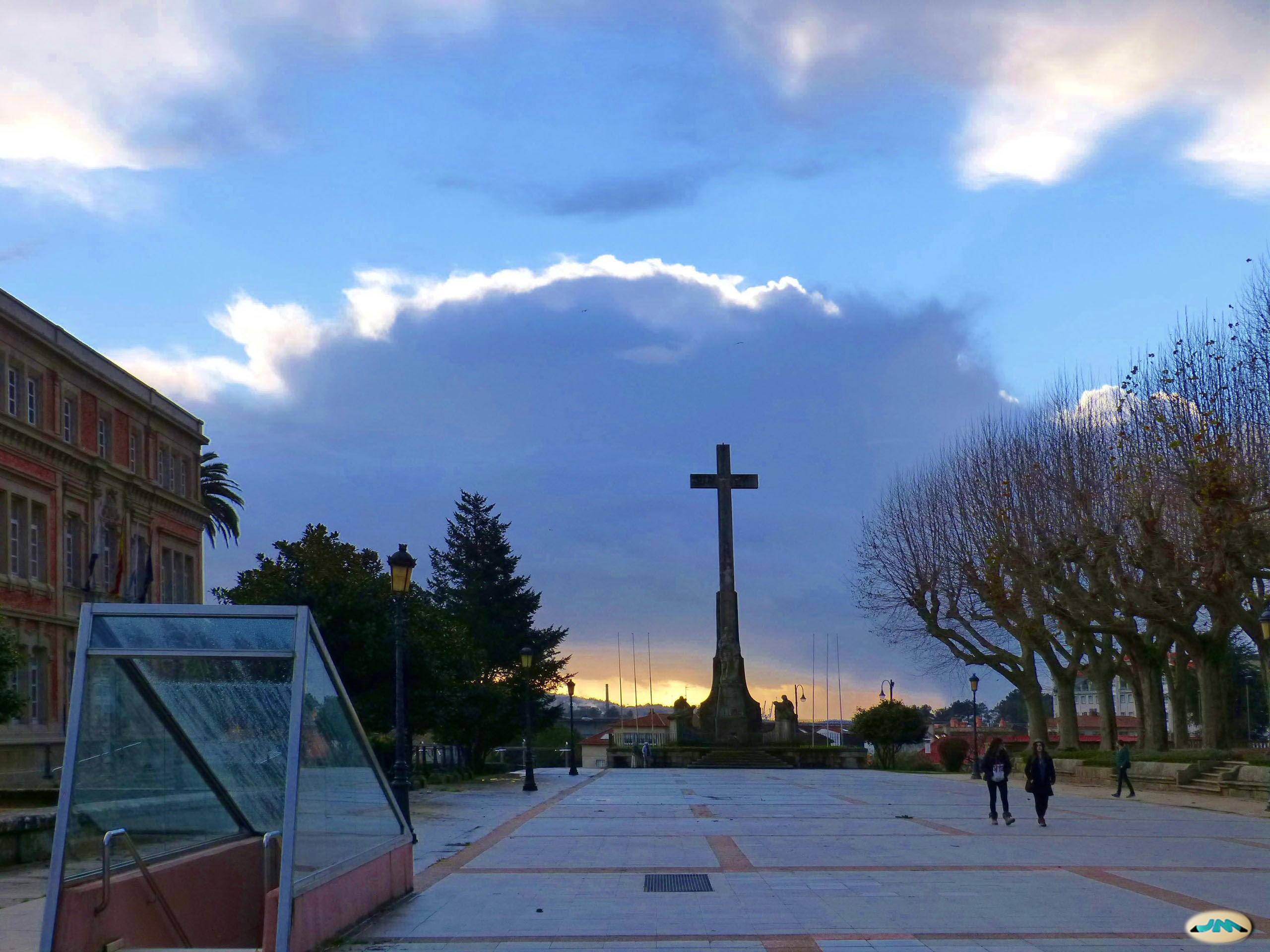
Gran Vía de Montero Ríos, end of the avenue

In July 1984, the plans for the construction of the city's first underground car park under the Gran Vía de Montero Ríos, with a capacity for 376 vehicles, were completed. On 23 March 1985, the old Cross of the Soldiers who died for the Fatherland was raised in order to carry out the work on the car park. The car park was inaugurated on 12 December 1985 and the avenue became the second pedestrianised thoroughfare in the city after Oliva Street.

On 12 August 1986, the Monument to the Soldier was inaugurated at the end of the Gran Vía de Montero Ríos, at the initiative of the mayor José Rivas Fontán. The City Council of Pontevedra chose to keep the 1940s cross and to complete it with a group of sculptures in order to transform the tribute to the soldiers who died for their country into a Monument to the Soldier.

In 1996, the avenue was renamed Gran Vía de Montero Ríos, taking the traditional name of Gran Vía.

In 2001, work was carried out on the underground car park and the Gran Vía de Montero Ríos was completely refurbished with a new surface. The renovation was inaugurated on 28 June 2001.

== Description ==
It is a flat avenue in the centre of the city with a straight course of 315 metres. Its average width is 24 metres.

It is a paved pedestrian avenue located in the 19th century bourgeois expansion area of the city, which ends with the monument to the soldier. Many of the city's most important institutional buildings can be found on this avenue, such as the Palace of the Provincial Council of Pontevedra, the building of the former Pontevedra Teacher Training College and the School of Arts and Crafts, the Provincial High School and the ruins of the Convent of Saint Dominic.

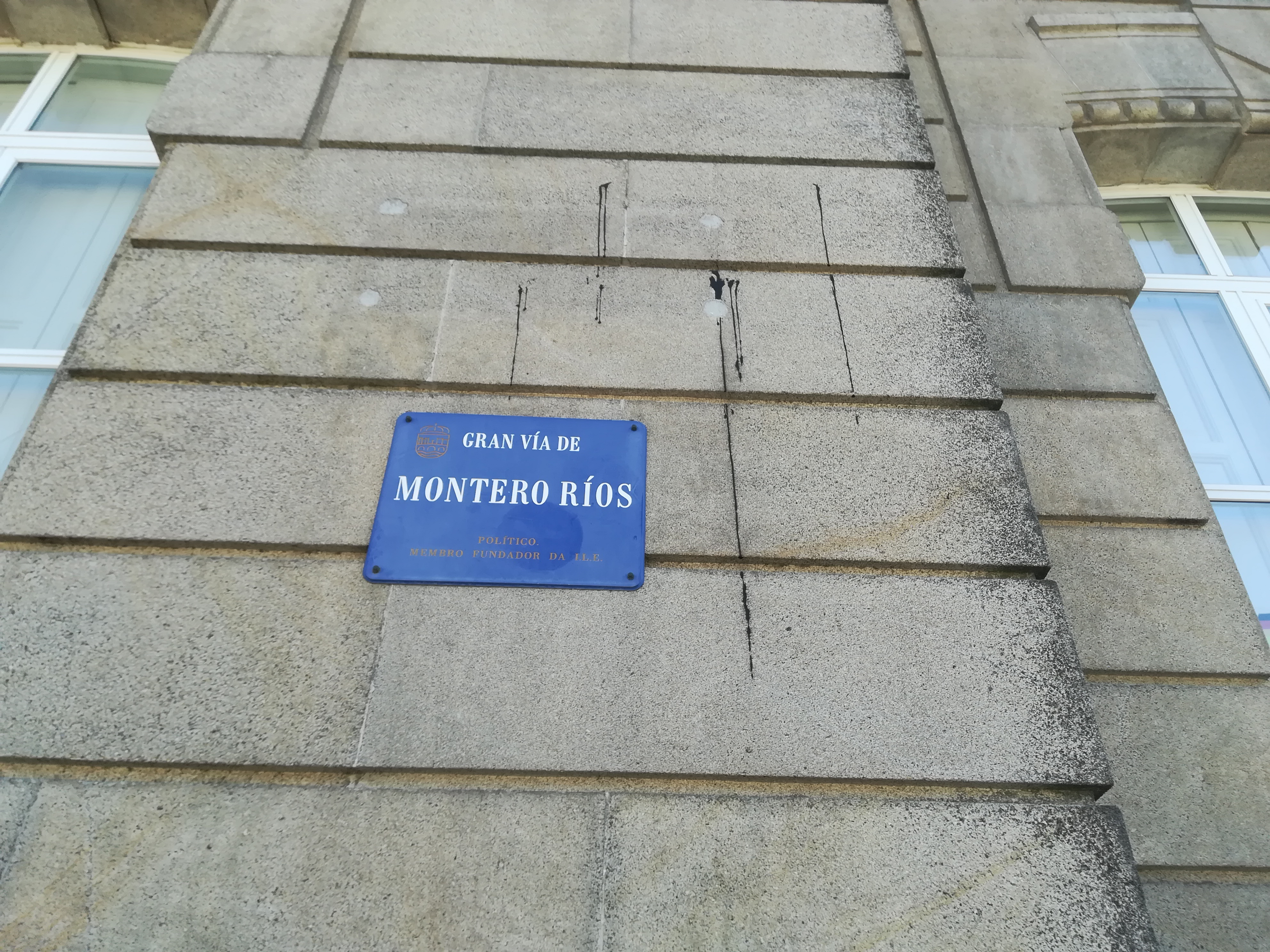
Gran Vía de Montero Ríos street sign

The Gran Vía de Montero Ríos begins in the east at the intersection of the Plaza de España and Marqués de Riestra Street and ends in the west, with stairs and slopes that go down to the Queen Victoria Eugenie Avenue. It is bordered on the north by the Alameda de Pontevedra and has an underground car park below.

At the end of the Gran Vía de Montero Ríos, on the west side, is the Monument to the Soldier, the work of the sculptor Alfonso Vilar Lamelas. It is a sculptural group weighing 60 tons, consisting of a cross and a group of sculptures whose total dimensions are 16 metres high, 8.20 metres wide and 3.40 metres deep. The dimensions of the sculpture groups are 3.45 m high, 2.10 m wide and 1.05 m deep. The cross is clad in stone and has a metal and concrete structure. Below the cross is a group of granite sculptures depicting a wounded soldier, assisted by two standing companions. On either side of the cross are two other carved groups with the same theme, but with dying soldiers assisted by other soldiers who bend down to take them in their arms. The monument is preceded by a flight of steps and surrounded by a balustrade.

== Outstanding buildings ==
The Pontevedra Provincial Council Palace, located in the middle of the Gran Vía de Montero Ríos, belongs to the eclectic style with elements and concepts inspired by French architecture. It is built in stone, has a square plan and two floors. The facade is symmetrically organised, with a central body and two lateral bodies slightly advanced with ashlar with bossages. A large staircase leads to the main entrance, which is inspired by a triumphal arch, with semicircular arches framed by fluted columns with Ionic capitals.

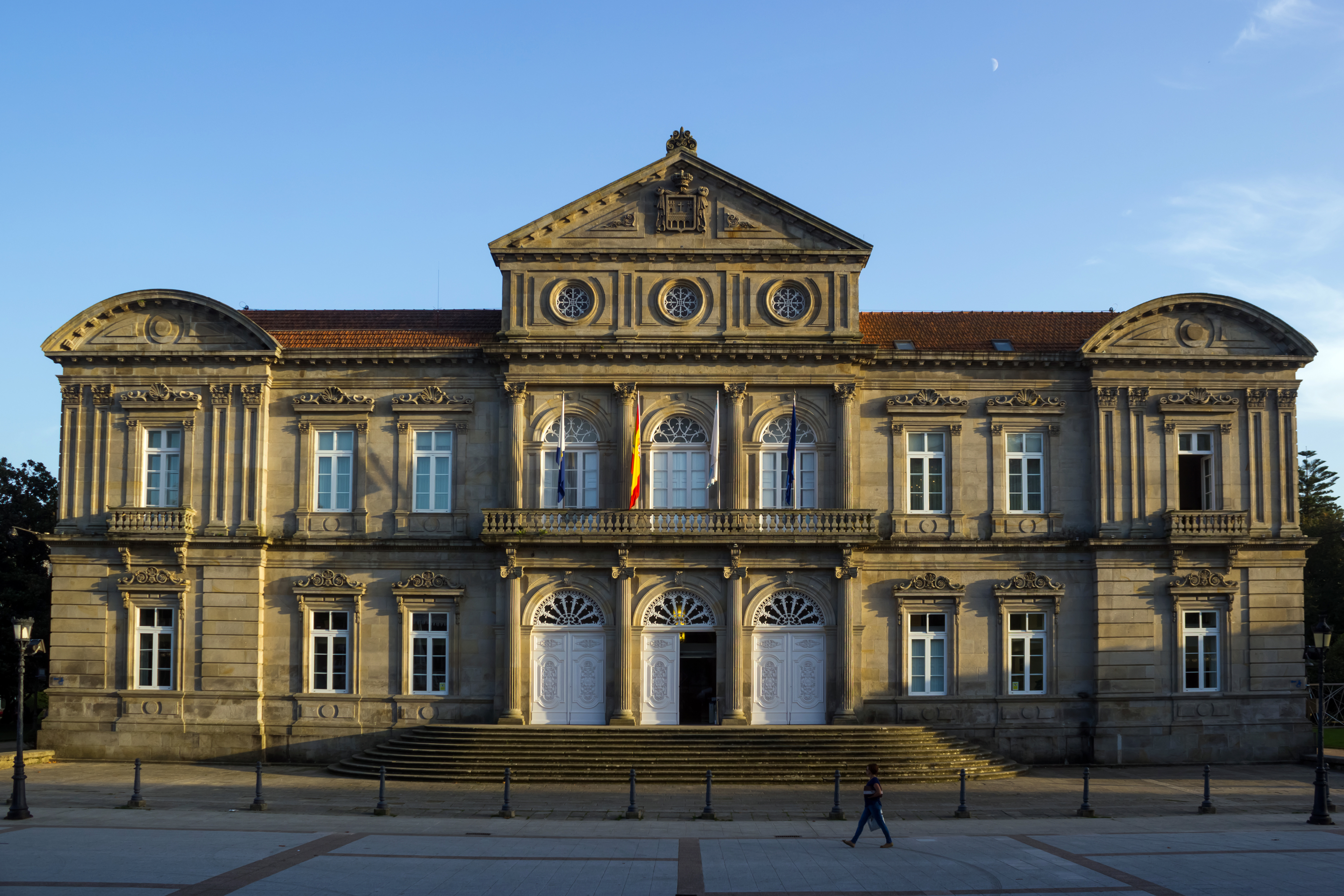
Pontevedra Provincial Council Palace.

The building of the former Pontevedra School of Arts and Crafts and the Pontevedra Teachers' Training College is an eclectic style building with a square plan, three floors and a half basement. Originally, the building had two floors and a recessed floor which was later transformed into a complete third floor. The façade has the traditional two-tone scheme of fine reddish and pinkish brick and granite, with decorative stone details around the windows and pilasters. It is surrounded by a granite plinth.

The Valle-Inclán High School building is a sober and elegant example of the eclectic and Art Nouveau styles. It consists of a basement, a ground floor and two upper floors. The Art Nouveau decoration of the facades, doors and windows, as well as the decoration of the window lintels and the dormer windows in the central part of the roof, are outstanding. The facade decoration consists mainly of geometric motifs on the windows and doors, floral motifs and small circles. The central body of the façade of the main entrance is decorated in the Art Nouveau style: a large window with a curved lintel and a geometric Secessionist rhythm. It has a tower in which the headmasters of the school lived during the first years of its existence.

The Ruins of the Convent of Saint Dominic are the remains of a 14th-century Gothic convent. Today, together with five other buildings, they form the Provincial Museum of Pontevedra and were declared a Site of Cultural Interest in 1895. Only the chevet is preserved, with five apsidal chapels corresponding to the transverse arm of the transept, which constitute the purest example of Gothic architecture in Galicia.

== Gallery ==
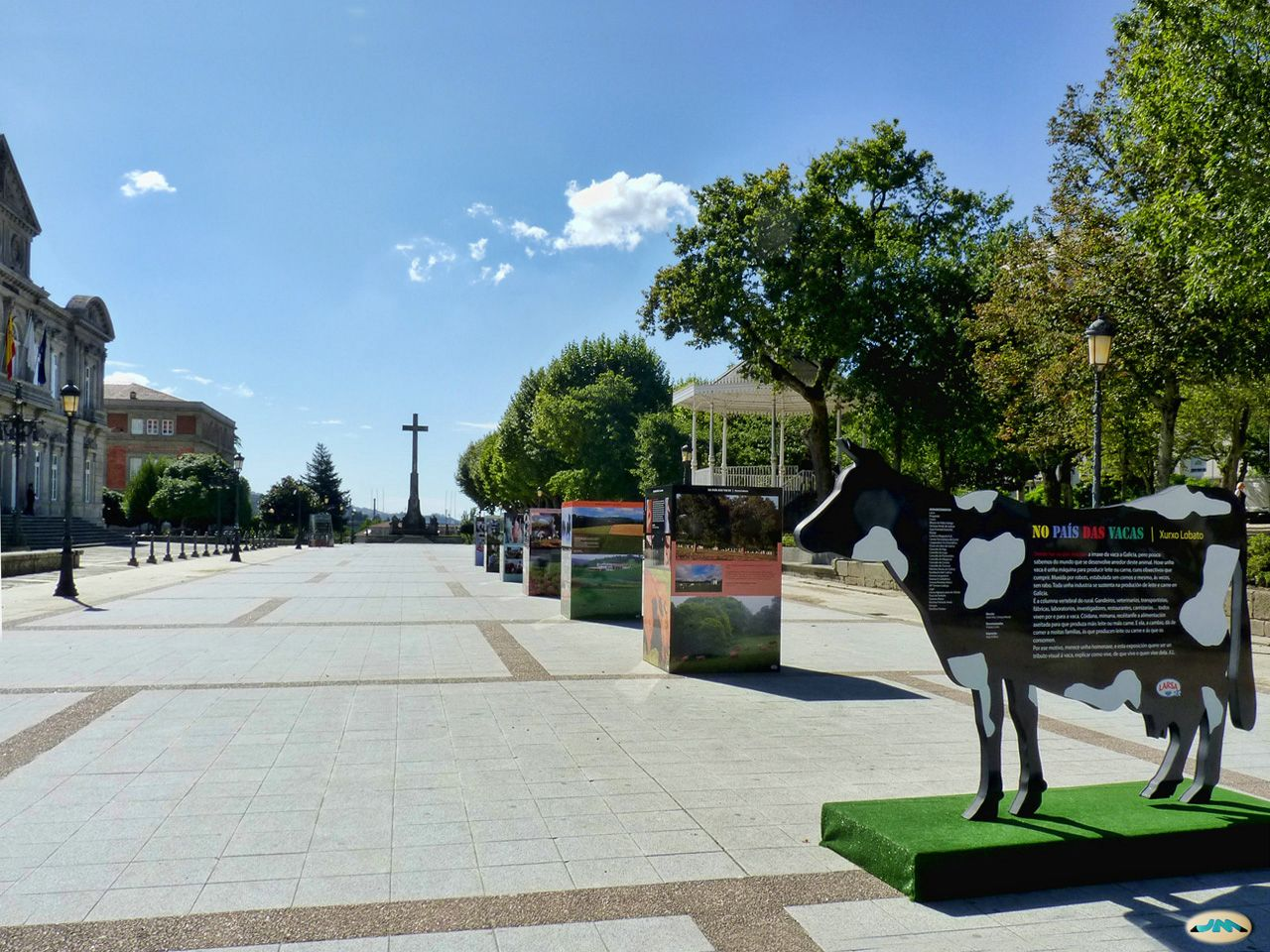
Exhibition in the Gran Vía in 2012

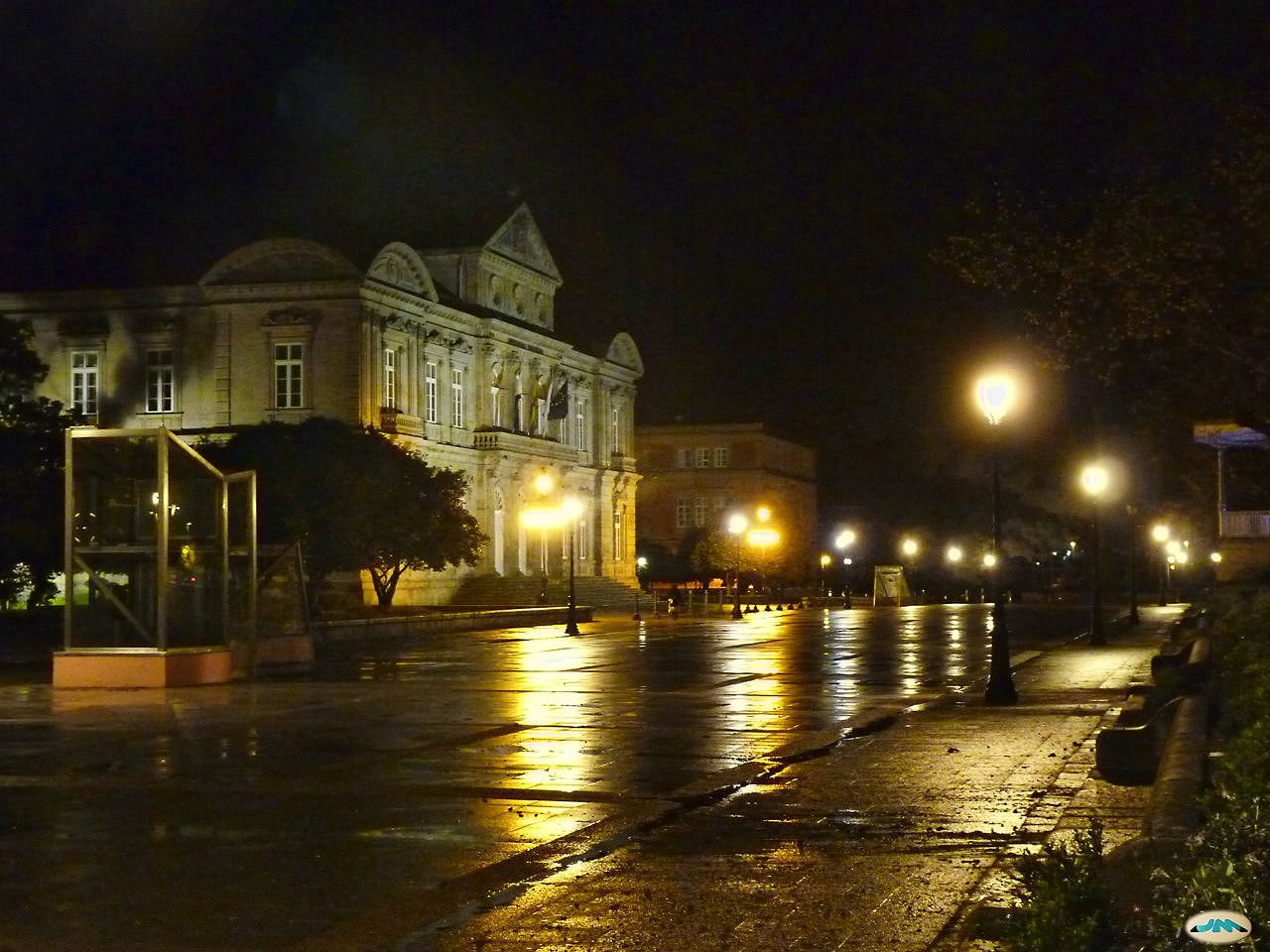
The Gran Vía de Montero Ríos by night

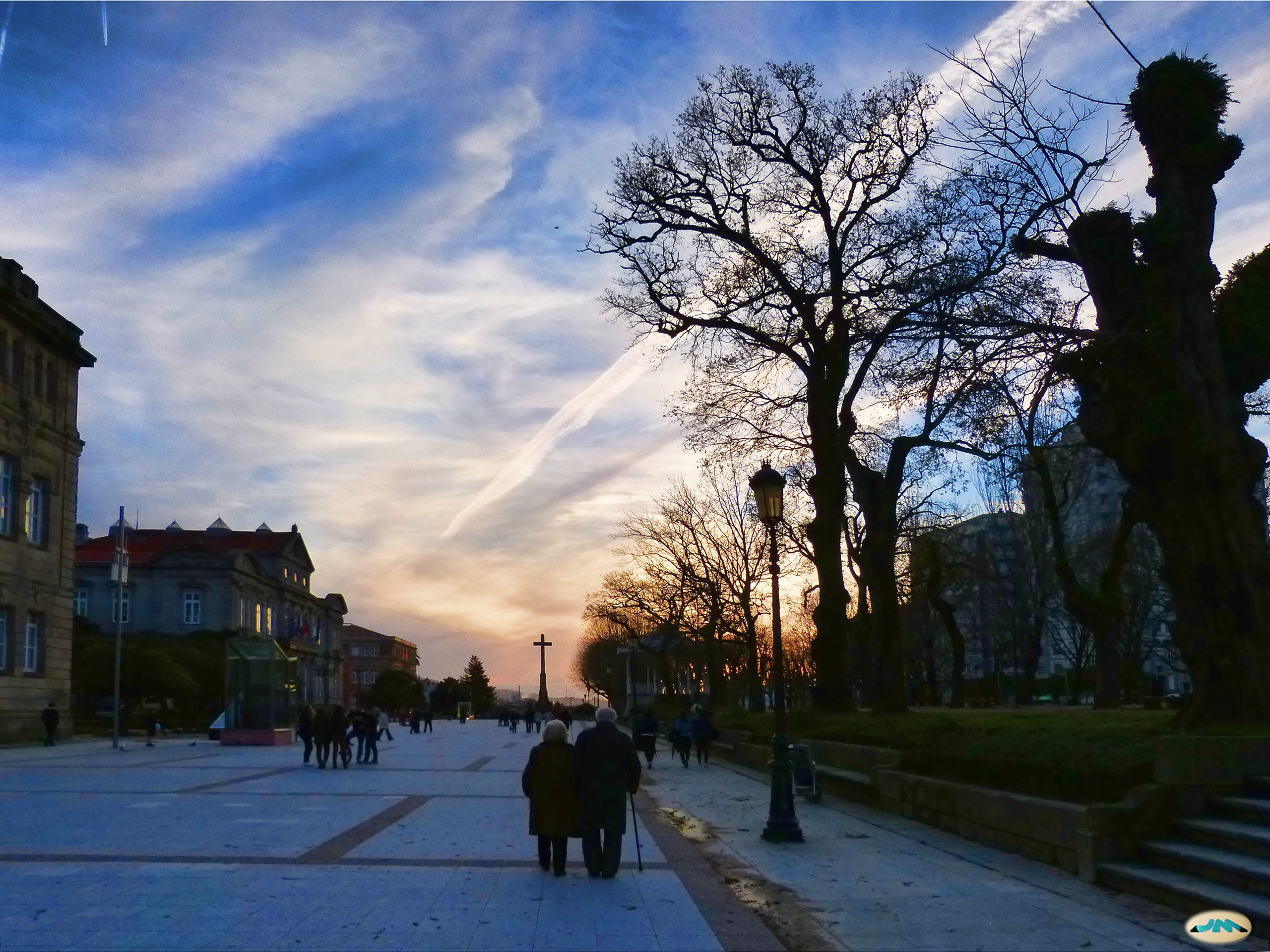
The Gran Vía at dusk

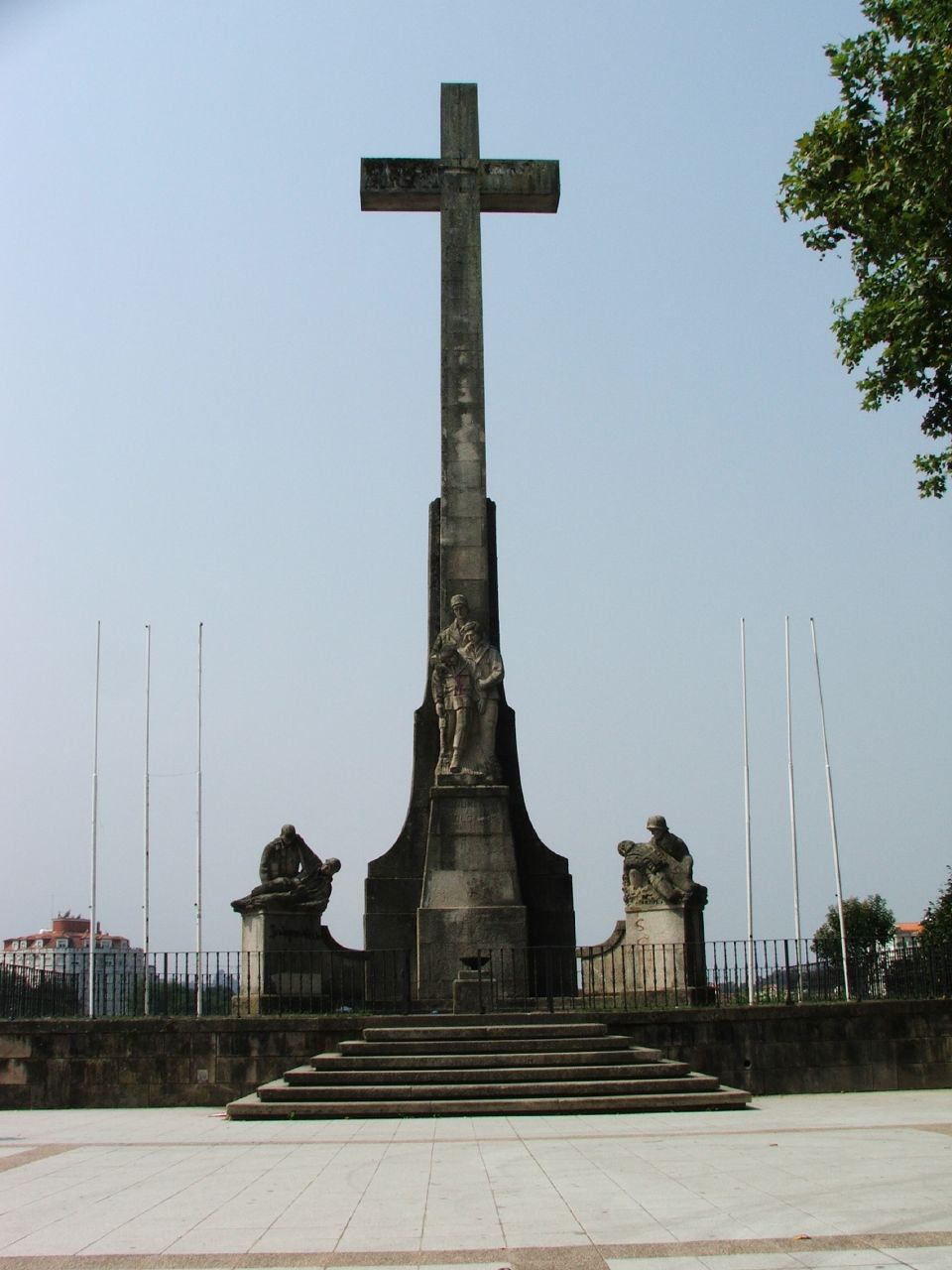
Monument to the Soldier by Alfonso Vilar Lamelas (1986)

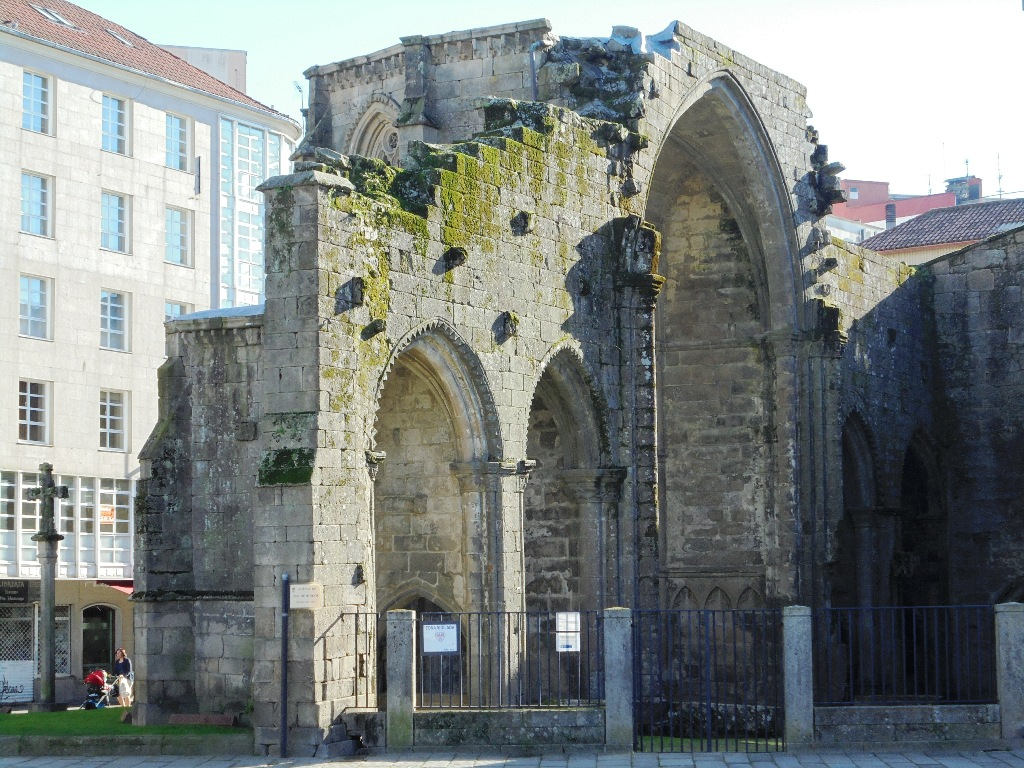
Ruins of Saint Dominic Convent

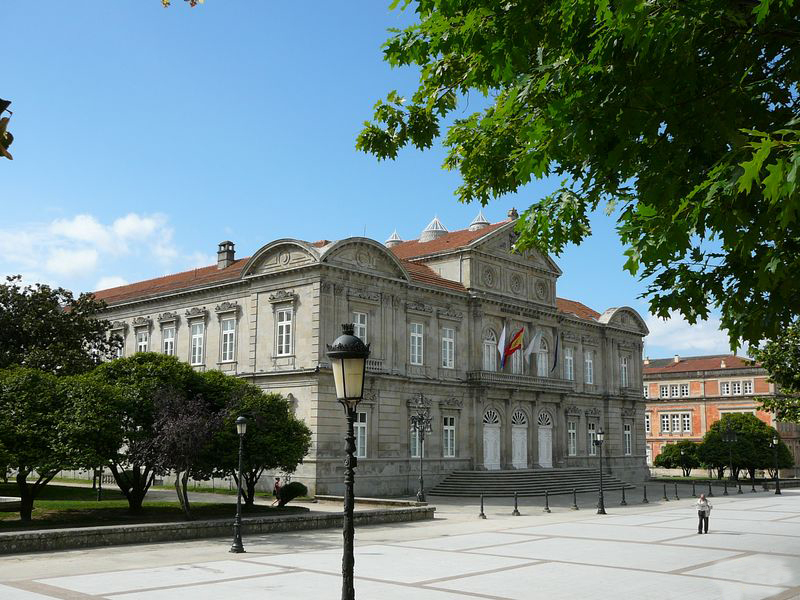
Palace of the Provincial Council of Pontevedra

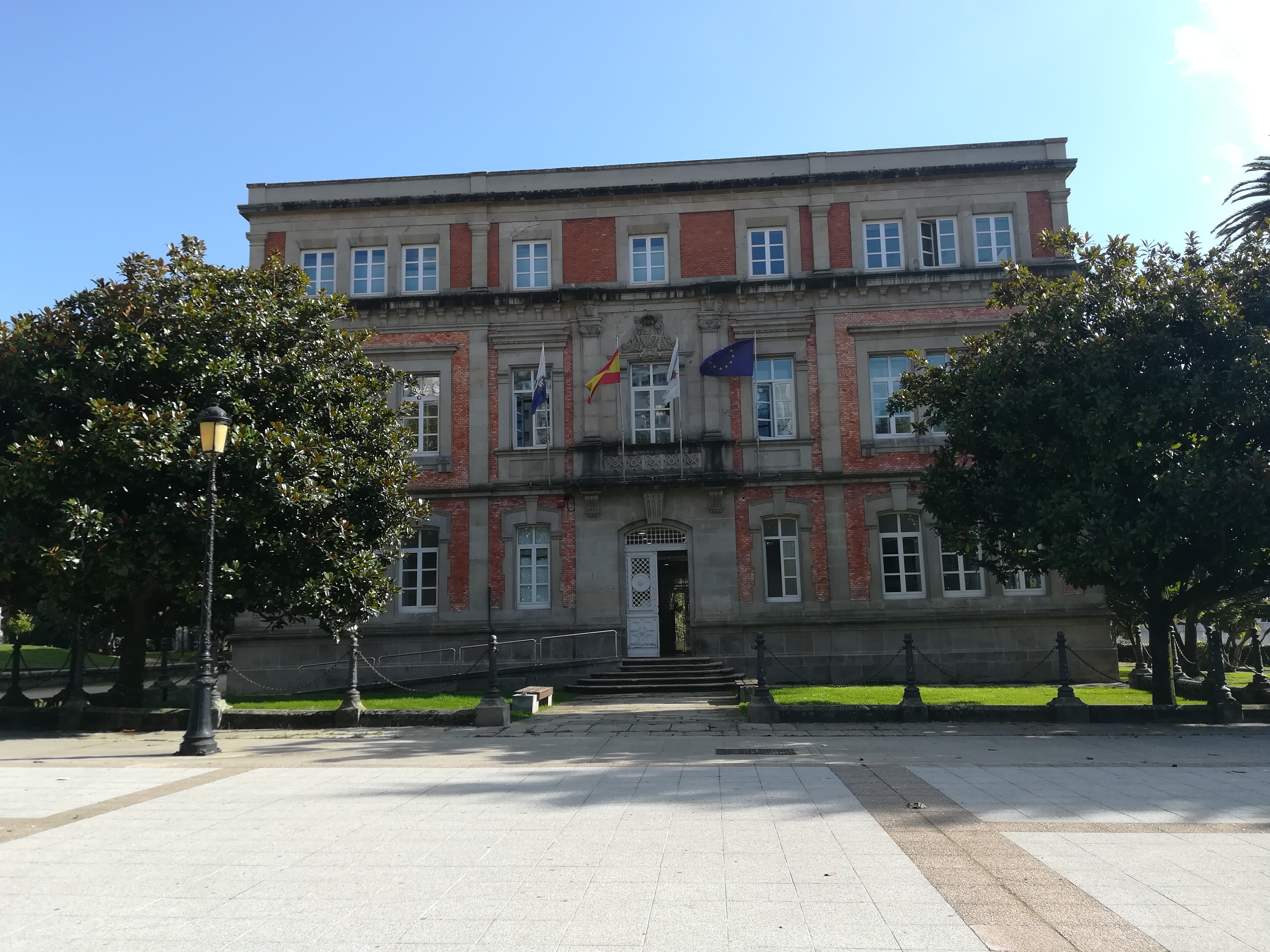
Old Pontevedra Arts and Crafts Building

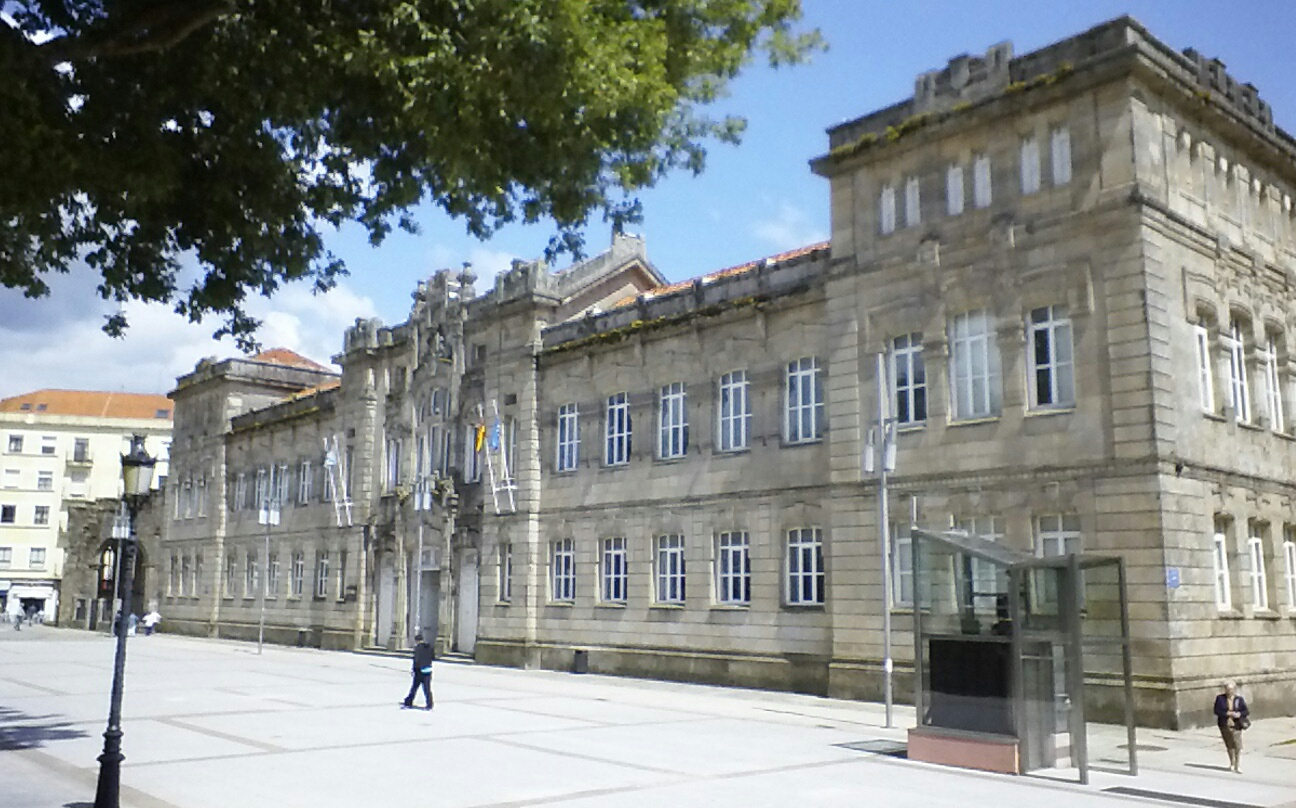
Valle-Inclán High School Building

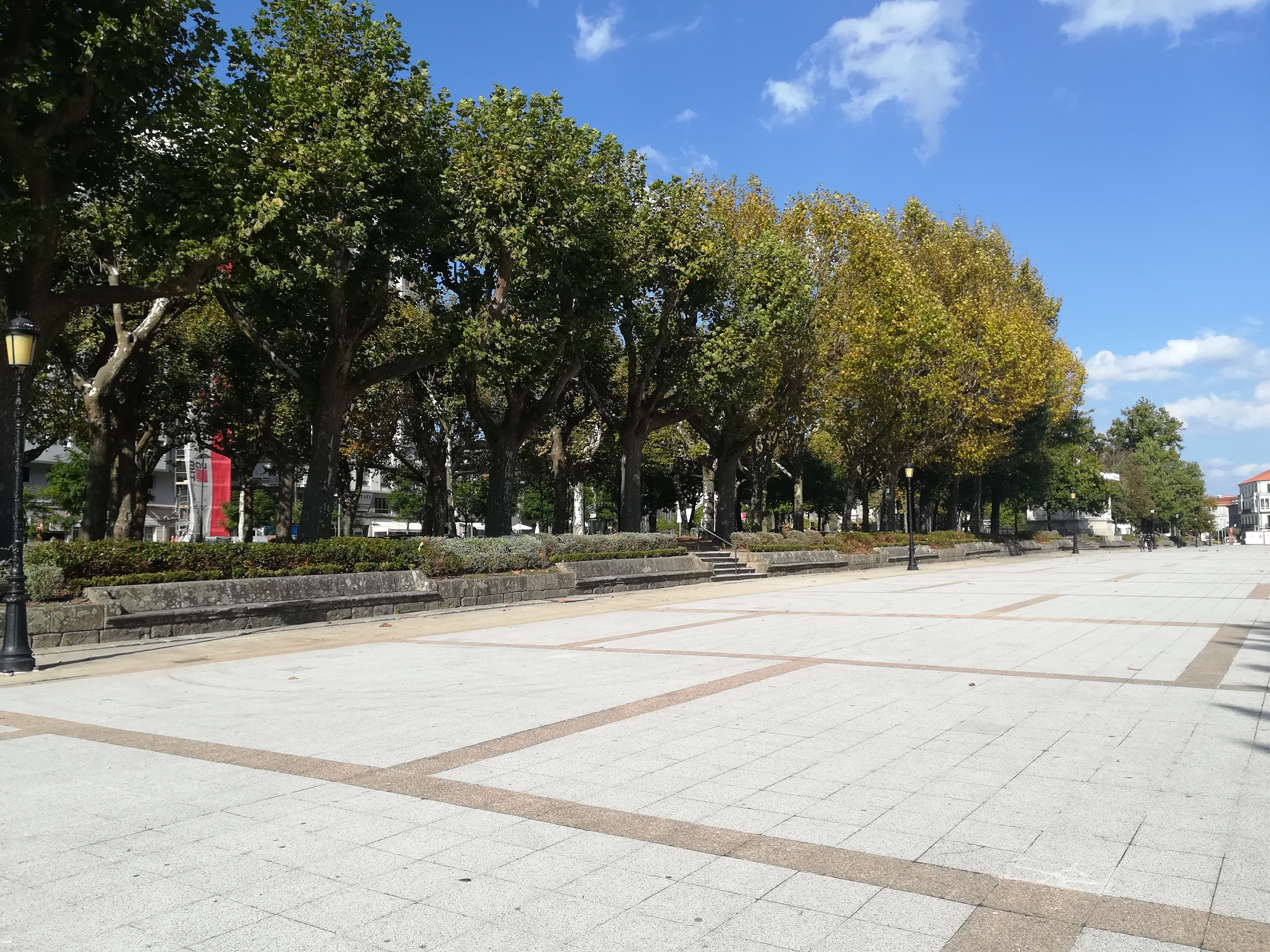
General view of the Gran Vía

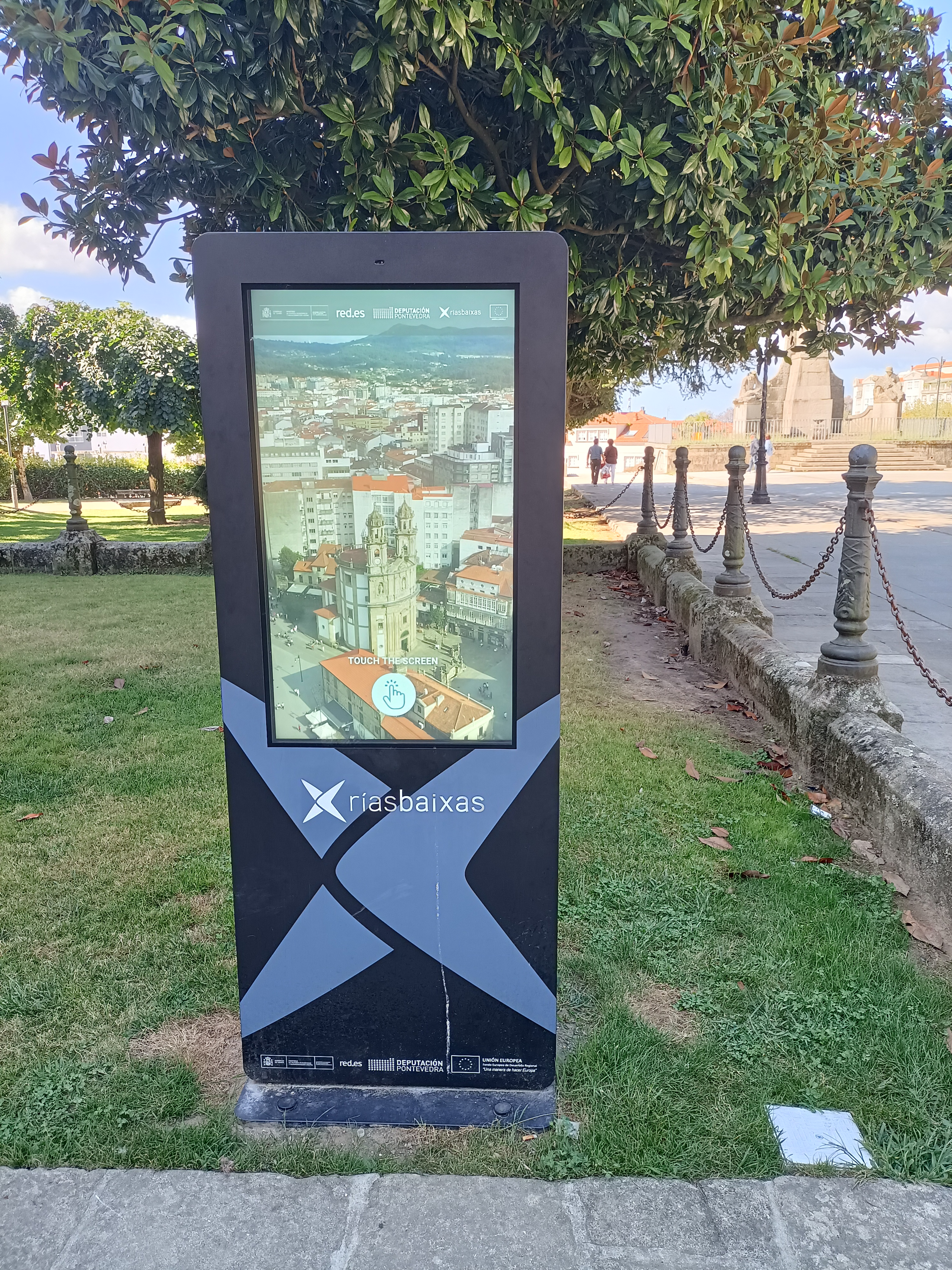
Tourist display of the city

== See also ==
=== Bibliography ===
- Aganzo, Carlos (2010). Pontevedra. Ciudades con encanto (in Spanish). Madrid: El País-Aguilar. pp. 72–73. ISBN 978-8403509344.
- Fontoira Surís, Rafael (2009). Pontevedra monumental (in Galician). Pontevedra: Diputación de Pontevedra. pp. 130–131. ISBN 9788484573272.
- Riveiro Tobío, Elvira (2008). Descubrir Pontevedra (in Spanish). Pontevedra: Edicións do Cumio. pp. 29–30. ISBN 9788482890852.

=== Related articles ===
- Ensanche-City Centre
- Plaza de España
- Alameda de Pontevedra
- Palace of the Pontevedra Provincial Council
- Old Pontevedra Normal School Building
- Valle-Inclán High School

=== External links ===
- Gran Vía de Montero Ríos
