= Valle-Inclán statue =

Statue in Pontevedra, Spain

Valle-Inclán
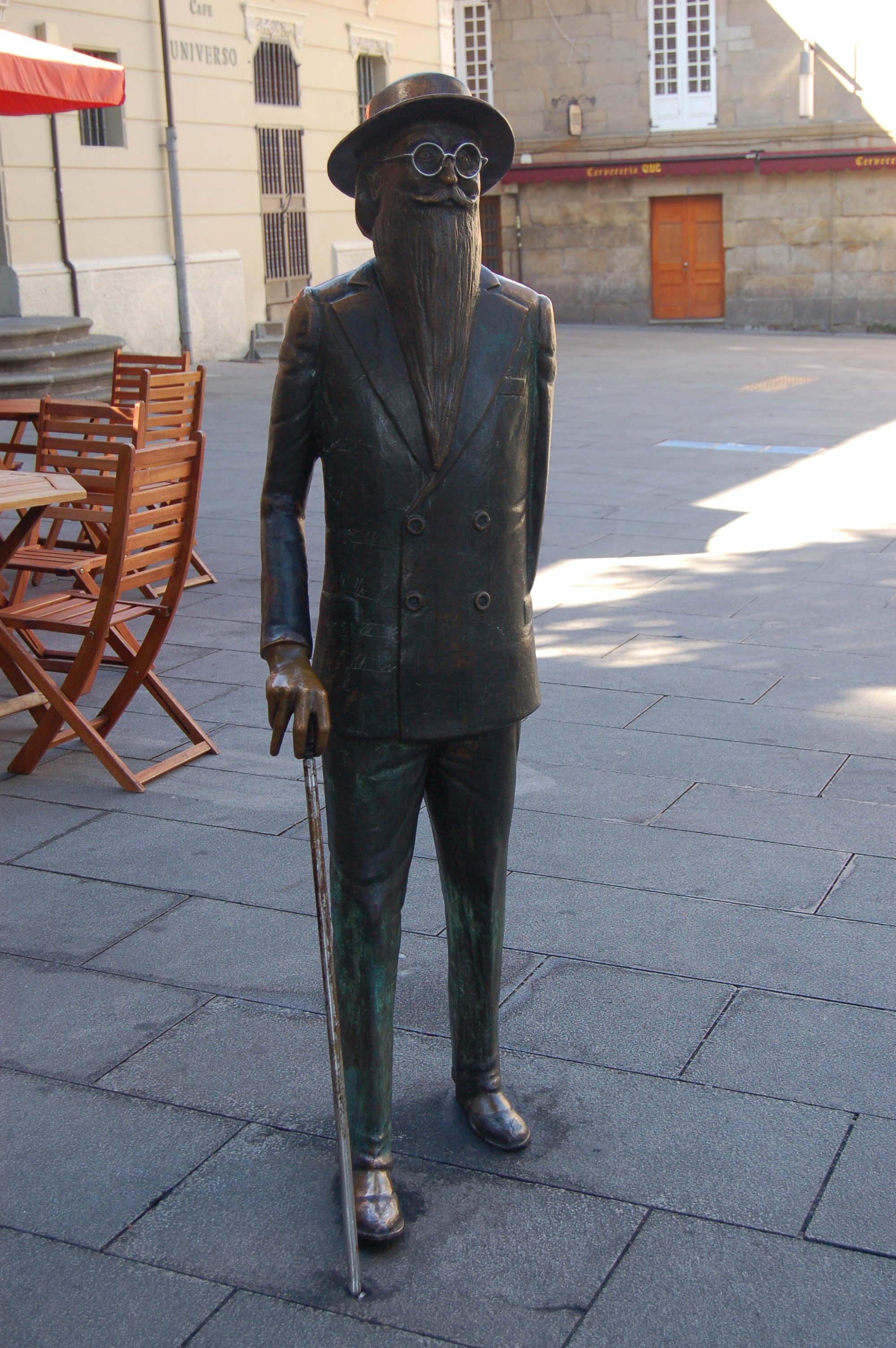
- The statue in 2013
- Artist: César Lombera
- Completion date: 26 June 2003; 23 years ago
- Medium: Bronze
- Subject: Valle-Inclán
- Condition: Good
- Location: Pontevedra, Spain; 42°25′58.6″N 8°38′39.7″W

Valle-Inclán, is a sculpture created by the Spanish sculptor César Lombera, located in Pontevedra (Spain). It is located in Plaza Méndez Núñez and was inaugurated on 26 June 2003.

== History ==
At the beginning of the 21st century, Pontevedra City Council decided to install a monument to the writer Ramón María del Valle-Inclán in the city because of his great relationship with Pontevedra and to compensate for the removal, in 1952, of a bust of this universal writer from the gardens of the Palm Trees Park, which was donated to the municipality of A Pobra do Caramiñal.

It was decided to install it in the Plaza Méndez Núñez, opposite the house of the Muruais (the brothers Jesús and Andrés), in whose important library it was trained and entered the world of literature. The sculpture cost 16,000 euros.

Ramón María del Valle-Inclán was born in Vilanova de Arousa in the province of Pontevedra. After studying there with the help of his father, the whole family moved to the capital of the province, Pontevedra, where his father had succeeded in being appointed secretary of the Gobierno Civil, the Government Delegation in the Province of Pontevedra. He began his secondary studies at the Provincial High School of Pontevedra in 1877. During this time, Jesús Muruáis, a French and Latin teacher and friend of his father's, influenced him in literary terms. He read Cervantes, Quevedo and the Viscount of Chateaubriand, as well as military works and works on the history of Galicia. On 29 April 1885, he completed his secondary education at the age of nineteen.

He studied law at the University of Santiago de Compostela, which he did not complete. After another stay in Pontevedra in 1890 he went to Madrid. He returned to Pontevedra in 1892 and then went to Mexico. He returned to Pontevedra in 1893 to relieve his nostalgia. He befriended Jesus Muruáis, in whose library he could read the most important European writers of the time. He often went to the Café Moderno and exhibited his particular dialectic that would later make him famous. In 1895 he published his first book of stories in the city: Femeninas.

It was at this time that Valle-Inclán adopted the attire of young French writers: a cape, a hat and, above all, a long beard. He lived in Pontevedra in a house in the Plaza de las Cinco Calles (Praza das Cinco Rúas) until 1896, when, at the age of 29, he moved to Madrid.

== Description ==
The figure of the writer is installed on one side of the square, in an attitude of exit from the House of the Muruáis, where he used to go to their library, one of the best in Pontevedra, and attend cultural events.

The sculpture is in bronze and depicts the writer as a life-size dandy, wearing a hat, double-breasted jacket and carrying a cane. He wears a moustache, glasses and his characteristic long beard. It weighs half a tonne and measures 1.75 metres.

The sculpture is based on the classic image of the writer and more precisely on a photograph of him walking along the Paseo de Recoletos in Madrid.

== Gallery ==
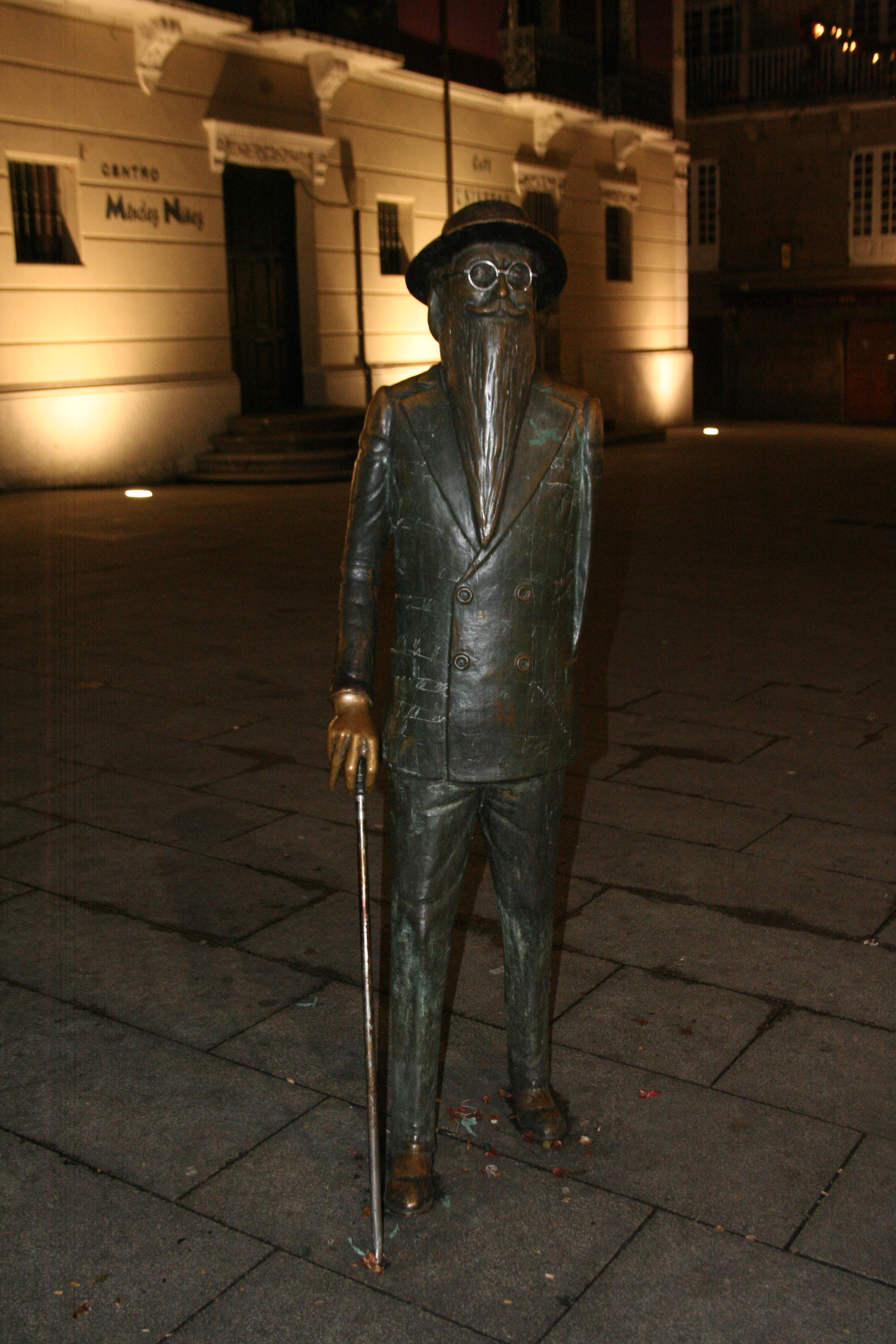
The statue by night

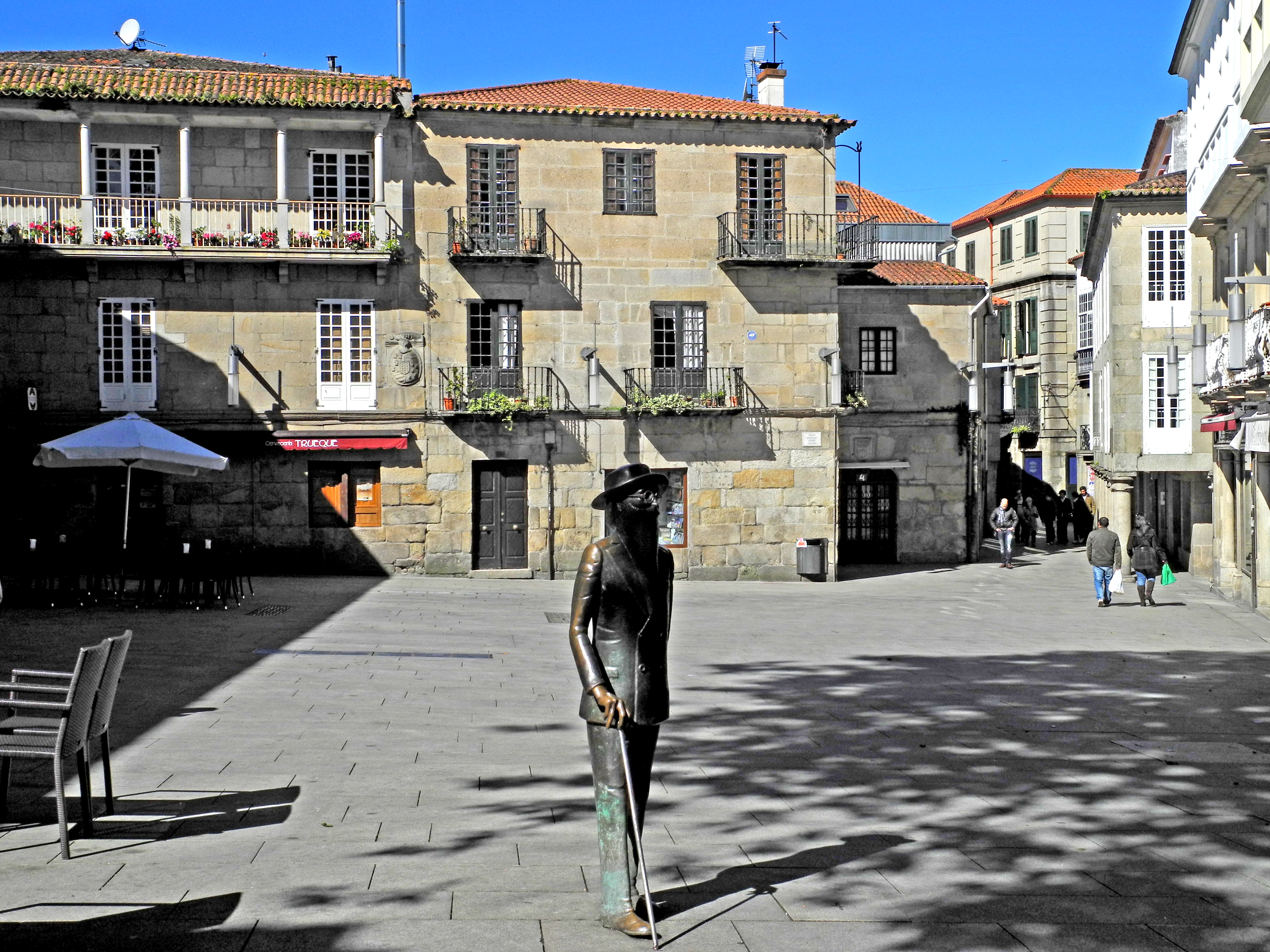
Valle-Inclán in the Méndez Núñez Square

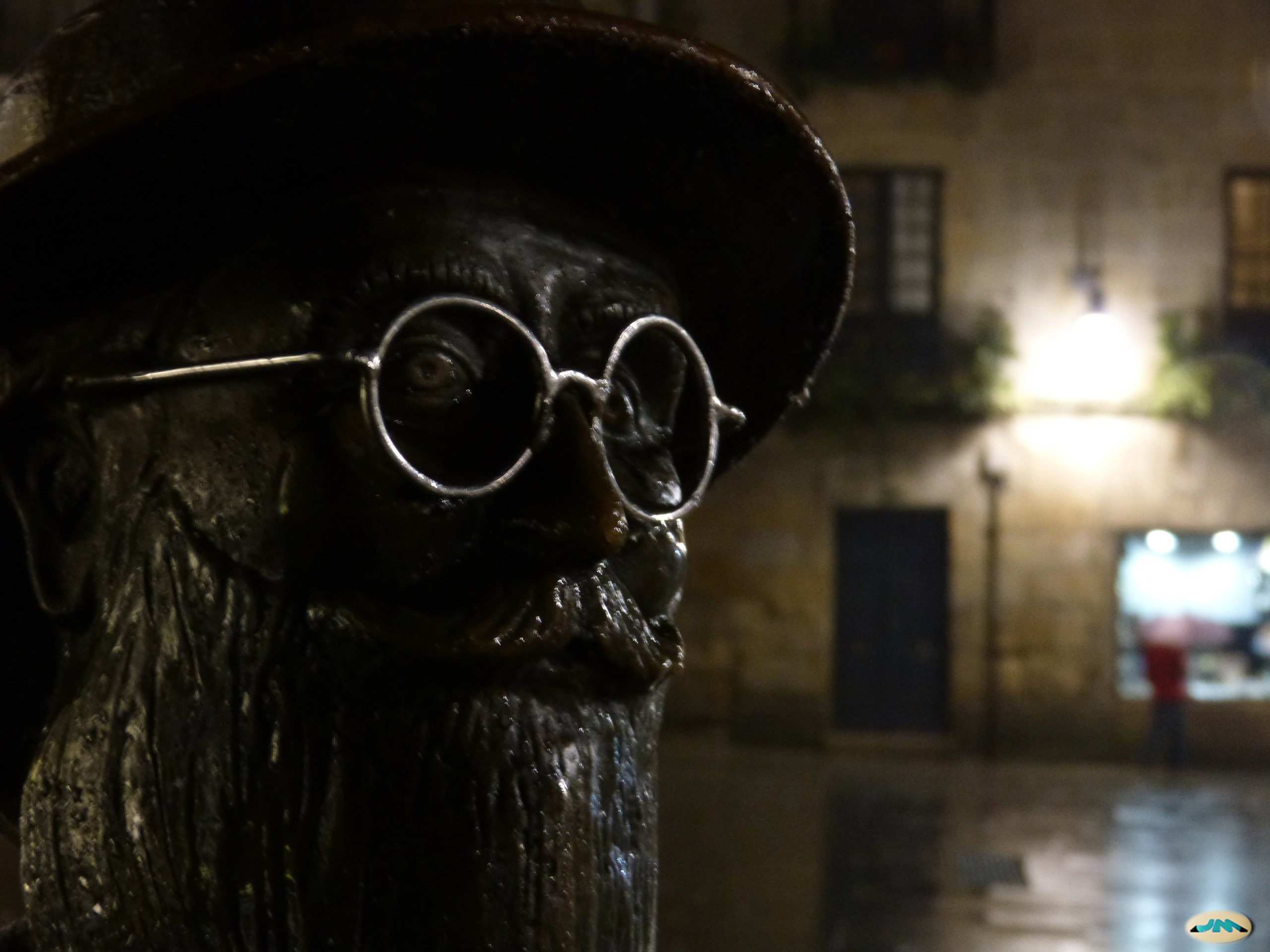
Face of the statue

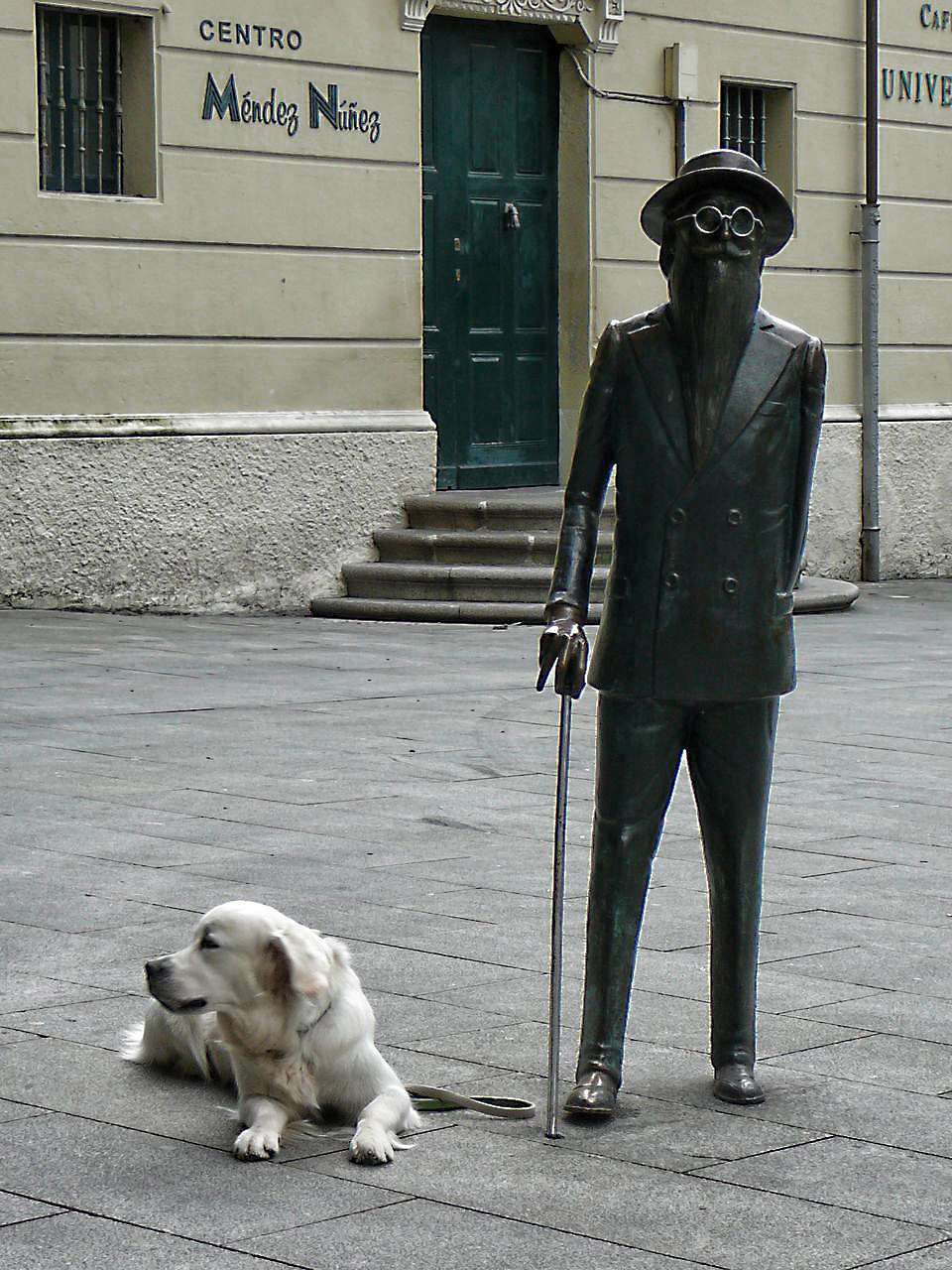
The statue on the square

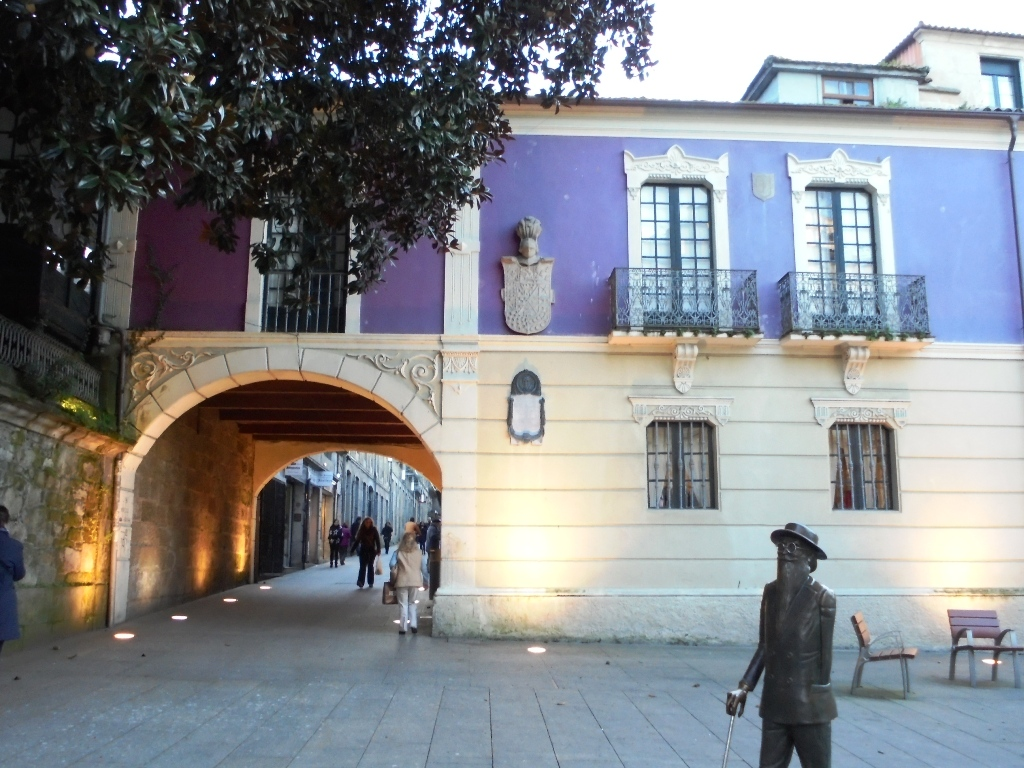
Valle-Inclán in front of the Muruais' house

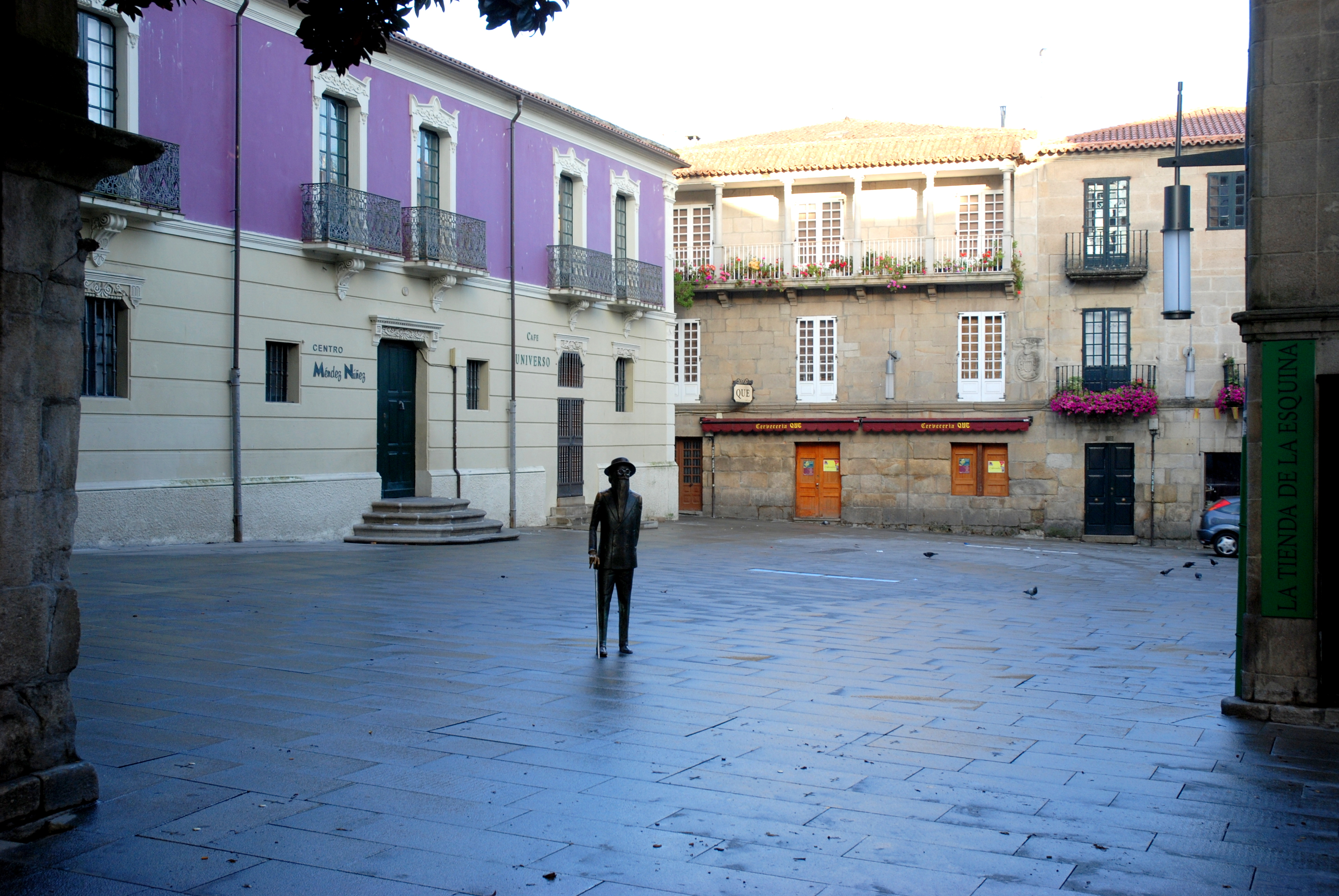
The statue in front of the Muruais' house

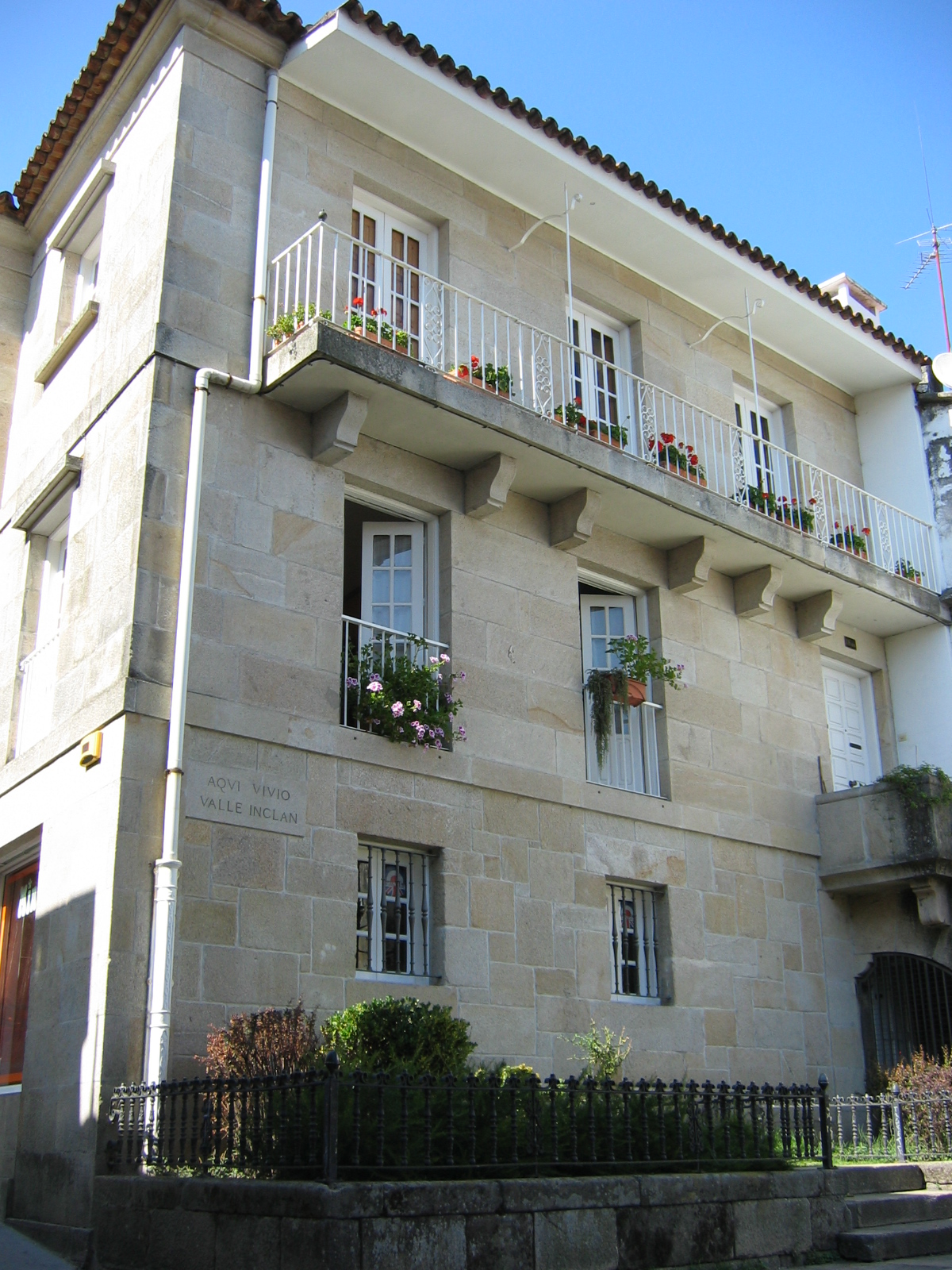
Valle-Inclán's house in the Plaza de las Cinco Calles

== See also ==
- Ramón María del Valle-Inclán
- Plaza de Méndez Núñez
- Valle-Inclán High School
- Teucer statue
- Tertulia Monument (Literary Circle in Modern Coffee)
- The Fiel contraste

== Bibliography ==
- Aganzo, Carlos (2010). Pontevedra. Ciudades con encanto (in Spanish). Madrid: El País-Aguilar. p. 66;128-129. ISBN 978-8403509344.
- Alberca Serrano, Manuel (2002). Valle-Inclán. La fiebre del estilo (in Spanish). Madrid: Espasa-Calpe. p. 46. ISBN 978-8467003154.
- Nadal, Paco (2012). Rias Baixas. Escapadas (in Spanish). Madrid: El País-Aguilar. pp. 35–36. ISBN 978-8403501089.
- Riveiro Tobío, Elvira (2008). Descubrir Pontevedra (in Spanish). Pontevedra: Edicións do Cumio. p. 41. ISBN 9788482890852.
