= Plaza de Méndez Núñez =

Medieval square in Pontevedra, Spain

Méndez Núñez square
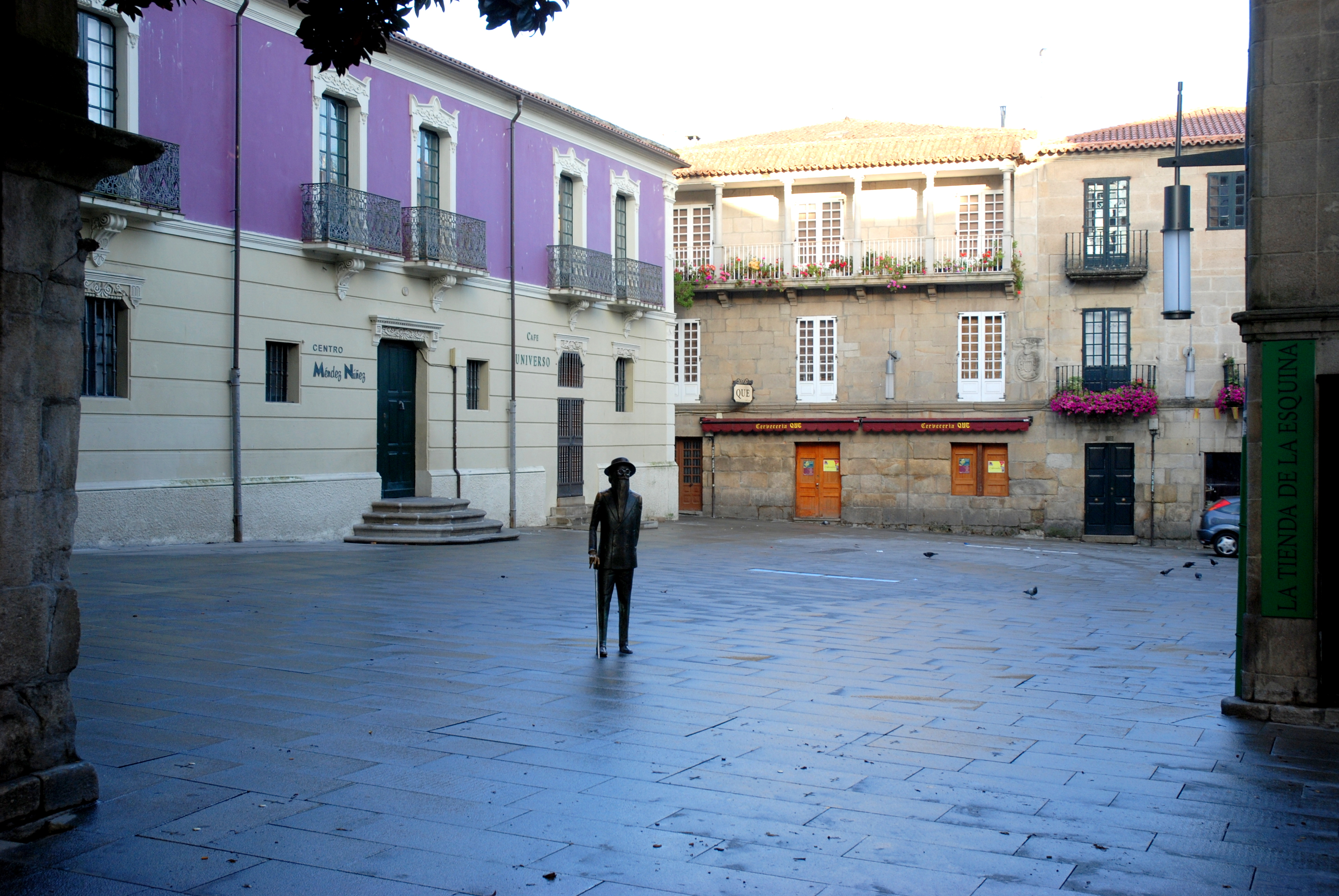
- Cru y Montenegro and Mosquera pazos and Valle-Inclán statue
- Native name: Plaza de Méndez Nuñez (Galician)
- Type: plaza
- Maintained by: Pontevedra City Council
- Location: Pontevedra, Spain
- Postal code: 36002
- Coordinates: 42.433028°N 8.644495°W

Méndez Núñez Square is a square of medieval origin located in the heart of the historic centre of Pontevedra, Spain.

== Origin of the name ==
The square owes its current name to Casto Méndez Núñez who lived in the Pazo de los Cru y Montenegro on the south side of the square in the 19th century.

== History ==
The square is part of a structure created during the second extension of the city walls in the 13th century.

The square came into being spontaneously, forming an open square from the widening of a main street (today's Sarmiento street) and the crossing of other secondary streets such as Don Gonzalo street. Its first known name was Campo da Herva, which referred to its origin as an uninhabited place outside the walled enclosure, where the first bartering could take place in the city.

Later, the square was called Plaza del Campo Verde and Plaza de las Gallinas, due to the poultry market that was held there. Its main activity was as a place for commercial transactions.

The noble Cru and Montenegro family lived from the 15th century onwards in the Pazo located in the southern part of the square. In the 19th century, Counter Admiral Casto Méndez Núñez also lived in this pazo, where he died on 21 August 1869. For this reason, on 31 August 1875, the square was given the name of Plaza de Méndez Núñez.

At the end of the 19th century, the siblings Soledad and Jesús Muruais became the owners of the Pazo de los Cru y Montenegro, making the square a place of reference thanks to its large library, located on the ground floor of the pazo and containing, among other things, works of European literature (especially French), art books and magazines, which were extremely important at the time as exhibitors of what was happening in the cities and in the artistic movements.

At the end of the 19th and beginning of the 20th centuries, Valle-Inclán, a friend of Jesús Muruais, regularly visited this library and took part in the famous meetings held there.

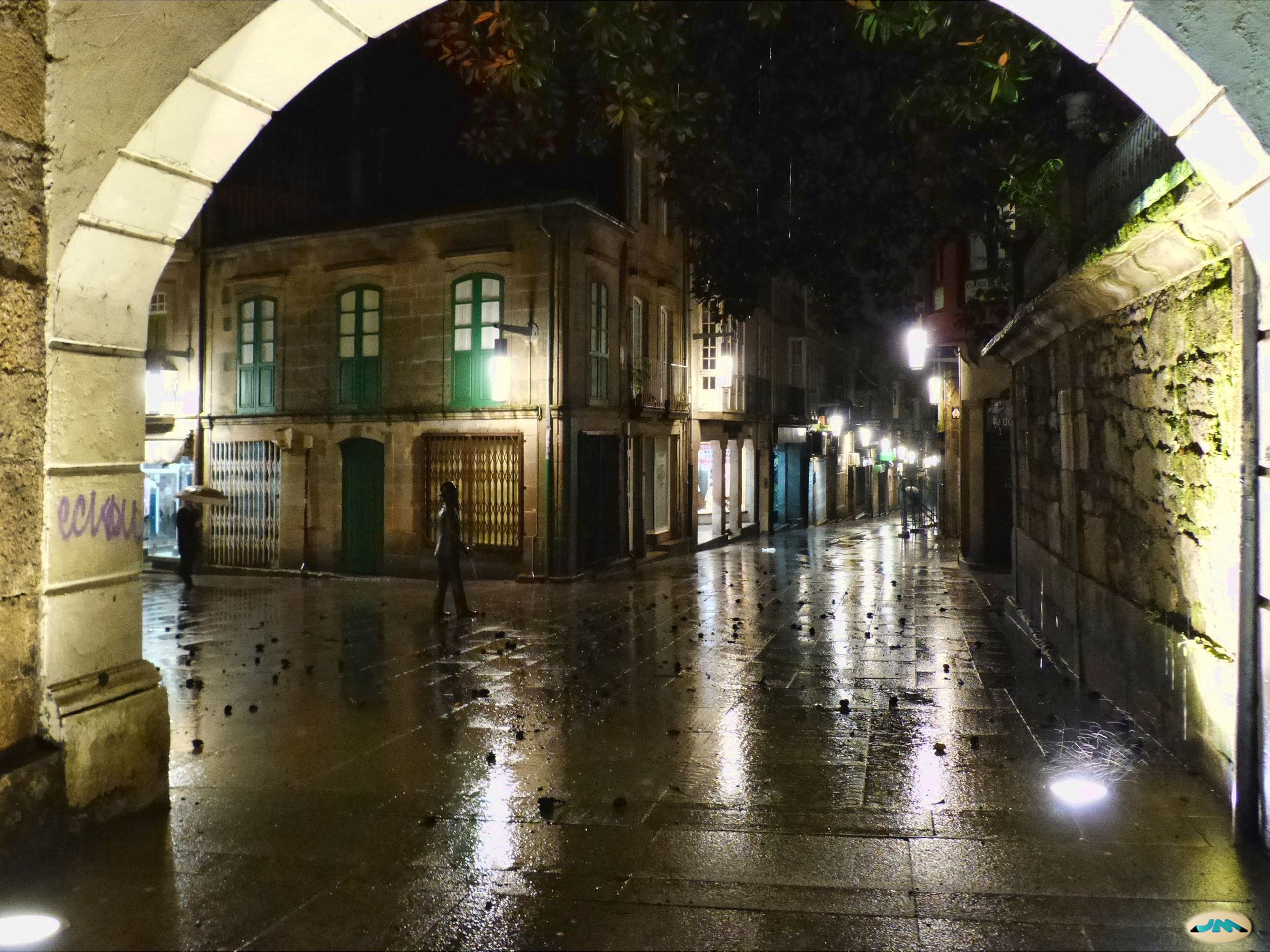
Arch of the pazo of Cru and Montenegro, Don Gonzalo Street.

The square was refurbished in 2002. Its current appearance dates from that time.

== Description ==
The square has a trapezoidal shape and the streets of Sarmiento, Palma, Don Gonzalo, César Boente and San Xulián converge on it. The square is paved and pedestrianised, as is the rest of the city's historic centre. After the 2002 renovation, the stone benches and lampposts that used to be in the square have disappeared and it has become a completely open space.

The square is overlooked on its eastern side by a large century-old magnolia tree, which is located in the urban garden of the Pazo de los Cru y Montenegro. The square is accessed from the south side of Calle Don Gonzalo through an arch that is part of this manor house.

The houses on the north side of the square had arcades, of which some characteristic columns remain, and some arcades on the west side, in Sarmiento Street.

Since 26 June 2003, a statue of Valle-Inclán has stood on the south-eastern side of the square, as if he had just left the Muruais house, where he used to go to the library and attend cultural meetings in Jesús Muruais' office.

== Outstanding buildings ==
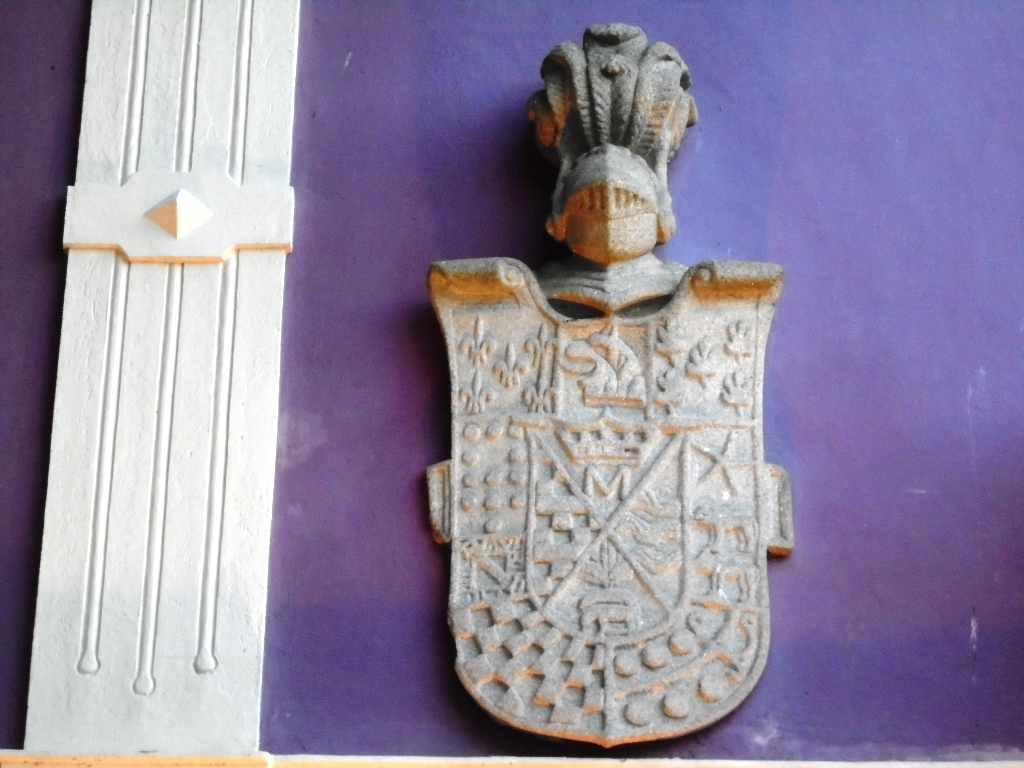
Coat of arms of the pazo of Cru and Montenegro

On the south side of the square is the Pazo de los Cru y Montenegro, which crosses Don Gonzalo street with its pointed arch. This manor house dates back to the 15th century, although it has undergone numerous subsequent modifications, particularly in the 16th and 19th centuries. Its façade was rebuilt in the eclectic style and it has a large stone coat of arms from the 17th century, known as the Coat of Arms of the Twelve Lineages, with the arms of Montenegro, Mariño, Sotomayor and Cru, and French windows with balconies on the upper floor. The manor house preserves the remains of its original crenellated tower, whose battlements have been replaced by a conventional roof.

The Pazo de los Mosquera is located to the west of the square. Its construction began in the 16th century and was modified in the 18th century. The top floor was added in the 20th century. Until then, it only had a ground floor and a lower floor. The coat of arms on the façade belongs to Luis Mosquera Sotomayor, who lived here in the 16th century. The interior of the manor house was divided into houses. At the beginning of the 20th century, this building housed the Balmes School, where the avant-garde writer Luis Amado Carballo did his first studies.

== Culture ==
On the west side of the square is one of the oldest bookshops in Galicia, the Cao bookshop, founded in 1948 and specialising in rare, out-of-print and old books.

== See also ==
=== Bibliography ===
- Aganzo, Carlos (2010): Pontevedra. Ciudades con encanto. El País Aguilar. ISBN 8403509340. p. 65-66.
- Armas Castro, José (1992): Pontevedra en los siglos XII a XV: configuración y desarrollo de una villa marinera en la Galicia medieval. Fundación Barrié de la Maza. ISBN 8487819338. p. 96.
- Fontoira Surís, Rafael (2009): Pontevedra monumental. Diputación de Pontevedra. ISBN 8484573273.
- Juega Puig, J. (2000): As ruas de Pontevedra. Deputación Provincial de Pontevedra, Servizo de Publicacións. ISBN 8484570444. p. 96.
- Nieto González, Remigio (1980) : Guía monumental ilustrada de Pontevedra. Asociación de Comerciantes de la Calle Manuel Quiroga, Pontevedra. p. 24-26.
- Riveiro Tobío, E. (2008): Descubrir Pontevedra. Edicións do Cumio, Pontevedra. p. 40-41. ISBN 8482890859. p. 41.

=== Related articles ===
- Old town of Pontevedra
- Sarmiento Street

=== External links ===
- on the website Xunta de Galicia Tourism
- on the website Rias Baixas Tourism
- on the website Visit Pontevedra
