= Valle-Inclán High School =

Art Nouveau Building in Pontevedra, Spain

- Instituto Valle-Inclán
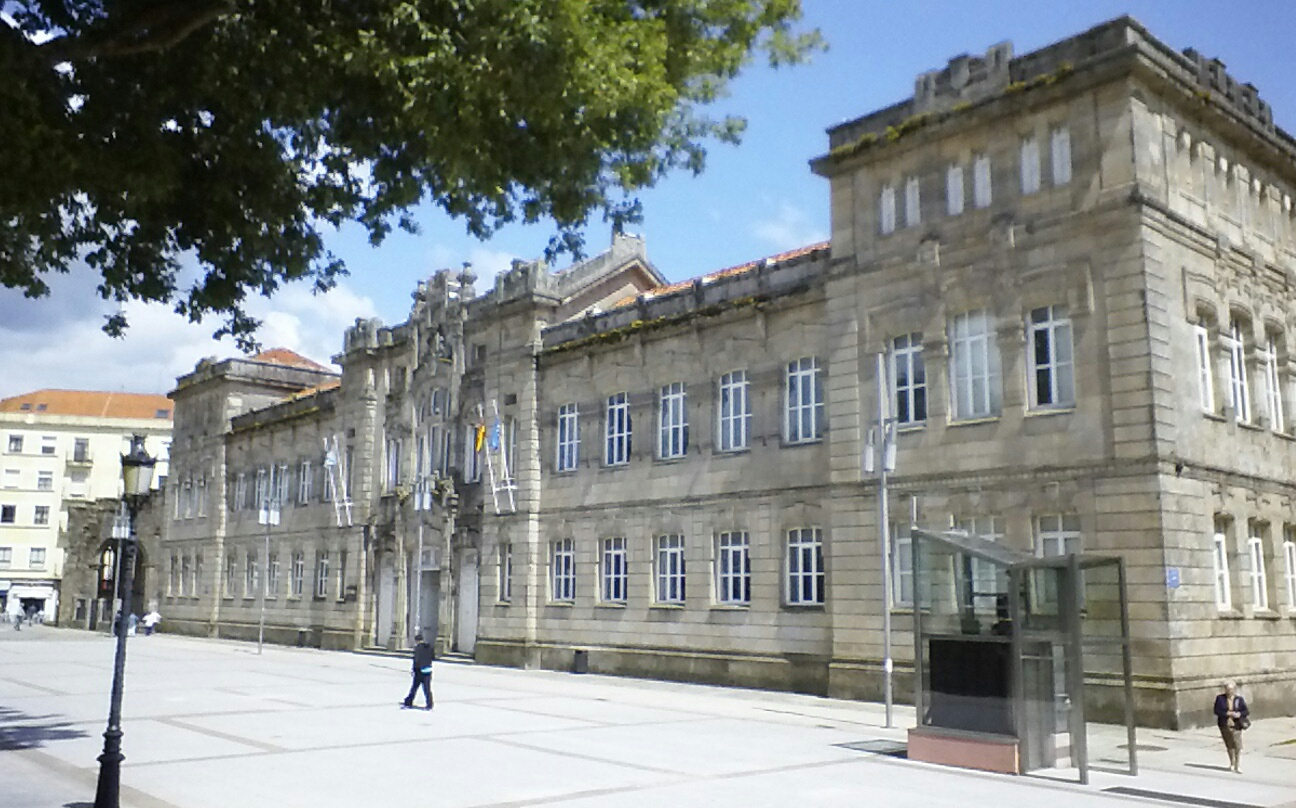
- Main façade on Gran Vía de Montero Ríos Avenue
- Interactive map of the Valle-Inclán High School area
- Alternative names: Valle-Inclán High School

General information
- Type: High School
- Architectural style: Art Nouveau
- Location: Pontevedra, Galicia, Spain
- Coordinates: 42°25′51.1″N 8°38′50.8″W
- Construction started: 1905
- Completed: 1926
- Opening: 1927
- Owner: Xunta de Galicia
- Management: Xunta de Galicia

Technical details
- Floor count: 3

Design and construction
- Architects: Joaquín Rojí López-Calvo and José de Lorite Kramer

Website
- edu.xunta.gal/centros/iesvalleinclan/

The Valle-Inclán High School is a large eclectic and Art Nouveau building located in the city centre of Pontevedra, Spain. It is named after the writer Valle-Inclán who studied and lived in Pontevedra. Today it is the seat of the Valle-Inclán Secondary School and was the first and the only secondary school in the province of Pontevedra from 1845 to 1927.

== Location ==
The school is located on the westernmost side of the Gran Vía de Montero Ríos avenue (built in the 1870s), opposite the Alameda de Pontevedra. This is the new middle-class neighbourhood created by the demolition of the city walls in 1855. The construction of other large buildings such as the Palace of the Provincial Council of Pontevedra, or the Pontevedra Normal School Building made this place the great leisure space of the city's bourgeoisie at the end of the 19th century and in the first decades of the 20th century.

== History ==
The Instituto de Segunda Enseñanza de Pontevedra (later called General and Technical High School of Pontevedra, Instituto General y Técnico de Pontevedra and Instituto Nacional de Pontevedra) was created by the Royal Decree of 30 October 1845 within the framework of the General Plan of Studies (known as Plan Pidal), which created a centre of secondary education in each Spanish provincial capital. The Provincial Public High School of Secondary Education of Pontevedra was inaugurated on 19 November 1845 and its seat was established in the former Jesuit College, located in the building next to the church of Saint Bartholomew. In 1880, the school hosted part of the regional exhibition that took place in the city.

In 1903 it was transferred to the Normal School, a building that now belongs to the Pontevedra County Council, to put an end to the numerous expenses incurred by the repairs of the old Jesuit College. The official initiative for the construction of a new building for the High School came from the Minister of Public Instruction and Fine Arts, Manuel Allendesalazar Muñoz de Salazar, at the beginning of 1903, when a competition was launched for the elaboration of the project. The Pontevedra City Council ceded the land annexed to the Ruins of the Saint Dominic Convent, which was partly occupied by the hospice on the site of the collapsed Dominican convent. With its construction, the great avenue of large official buildings of the Gran Vía was completed. In addition to the high school, the buildings of the Pontevedra Provincial Council Palace and the old Normal School gave shape to this new official architecture of the last decades of the 19th century.

The project by the architects Joaquín Rojí López-Calvo and José de Lorite Kramer was selected in July 1904, as stated in the minutes of the school. The work was put out to tender at a cost of 575,109.20 pesetas. The building consisted of two courtyards, chapel, library and laboratories. The work was promoted by the Minister Augusto González Besada (a former student of the high school). On 5 January 1905, the two architects who designed the building project arrived from Madrid to start work on the Provincial General and Technical High School of Pontevedra and met with the mayor Bernardo López Suárez and the contractor, Manuel Domínguez. On 4 May, the architects returned to the city and the ground plan was drawn up on the site to begin work. In February 1906, the construction of the building got underway, and by April, numerous workers were already working on it, with the material being transported by means of carts.

The work was completed in early 1926, taking longer than expected due to the economic crisis. The architect Joaquín Rojí went to Pontevedra on 28 February 1926 to sign off on the building. He was then asked to budget for its interior, which took more than a year. The school was inaugurated on 27 September 1927 by King Alfonso XIII during a visit to Pontevedra.

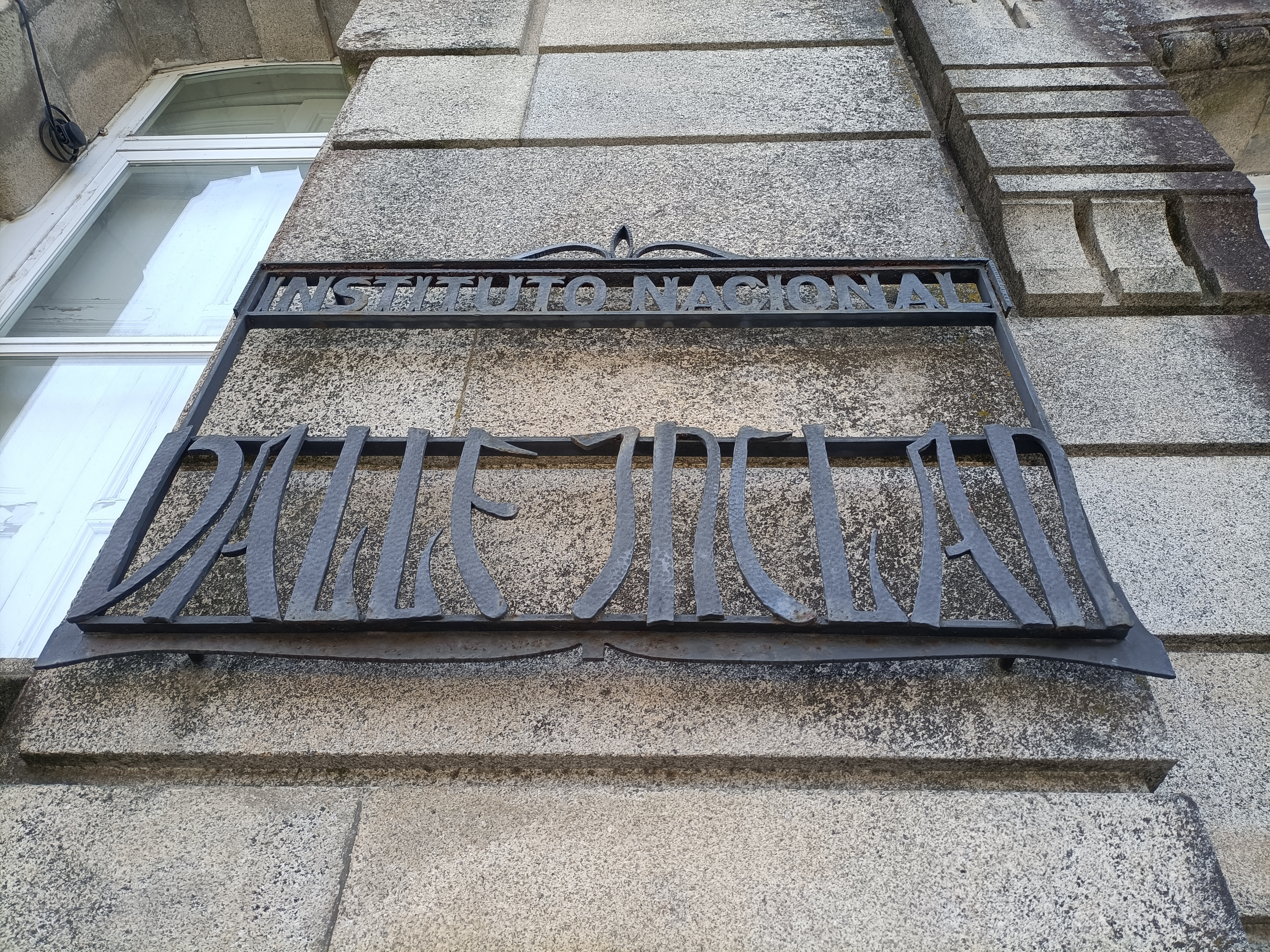
Old plaque of the National Valle-Inclán High School on the main façade

In the Post-war period, the students of the high school (boys and girls) were separated into two different floors with independent entrances. In 1963, a girls' high school, which would become the current Valle-Inclán High School, was created and the building was renovated. The girls' high school was temporarily moved in 1964 to the Normal School during the renovation works. The last complete renovation of the building was undertaken in 1972.

A major renovation of the building will begin in 2023, in which the Xunta de Galicia will invest 4.7 million euros. Among other improvements, all the windows in the building will be replaced, the hot water, heating and lighting systems will be renewed and the structure of the building will be improved by reinforcing the floor slabs and the metal roof of the covered courtyard will be renovated.

During the 20th century, renowned teachers such as Castelao, Gonzalo Torrente Ballester, Aquilino Iglesias Alvariño, Jesús Muruais, Emilio Álvarez Jiménez, Víctor Said Armesto, Antón Losada Diéguez, José Filgueira Valverde and Bibiano Fernández-Osorio Tafall made it sufficiently famous to be one of the most highly regarded in the field of education.

It is one of the few former Spanish high schools that has retained its original use over the years, since the building was inaugurated.

== Description ==
It is a sober and elegant example of the eclectic and Art Nouveau styles. Its main façade and entrance are located on the Gran Vía de Montero Ríos, although it has a rear exit that leads to an irregularly shaped backyard enclosed by a fence for the use of the high school and another exit in the back corner where the tower in front of the Palm Trees Park is located.

It has a basement, a ground floor and two upper floors. The decoration of the Bossages on the façades and the doorways of the art nouveau windows is remarkable, as is the decoration of the window Lintels and the Dormer windows in the central part of the roof. The decoration on the façade consists mainly of geometric motifs above the windows and doors and floral motifs and small circles. The central body of the main entrance façade is decorated in an Art Nouveau style: a large window with a curved lintel and a secessionist geometric rhythm. It has a tower in which the school's directors resided during the early years of its existence.

Inside, there is a large central marble staircase illuminated by a large Art Nouveau skylight bearing the Pontevedra coat of arms, which allows access to the first floor and ends in front of the establishment's large conference room (Paraninfo). The building has several lateral staircases that connect to the different floors, which were originally made of wood and spiral. The composition of the building is symmetrical and regular, with the classrooms in the main wing of the building organised around a central rectangular courtyard with metal roof surrounded by large windows that bring in light. The building has 8,300 square metres of floor space and 323 windows on four floors.

On the ground floor is the school's library. This large room has a wooden staircase that leads to the upper floor where there is a walkway surrounding the shelves and a wooden railing.

More than 760 pupils study at the high school.

== Culture ==
In 1966, a proposal by Gonzalo Torrente Ballester was approved and the school adopted its current name "Valle-Inclán" because of the writer's relationship with the city, where he studied, lived, wrote and published his first book "Femeninas" in 1895. Valle-Inclán, at the age of 12, began his secondary studies in Pontevedra, which he also completed in Pontevedra in 1883.

The school was the birthplace of the Aula Castelao of Philosophy and, at the same time, of the Galician Philosophy Week.

== Gallery ==
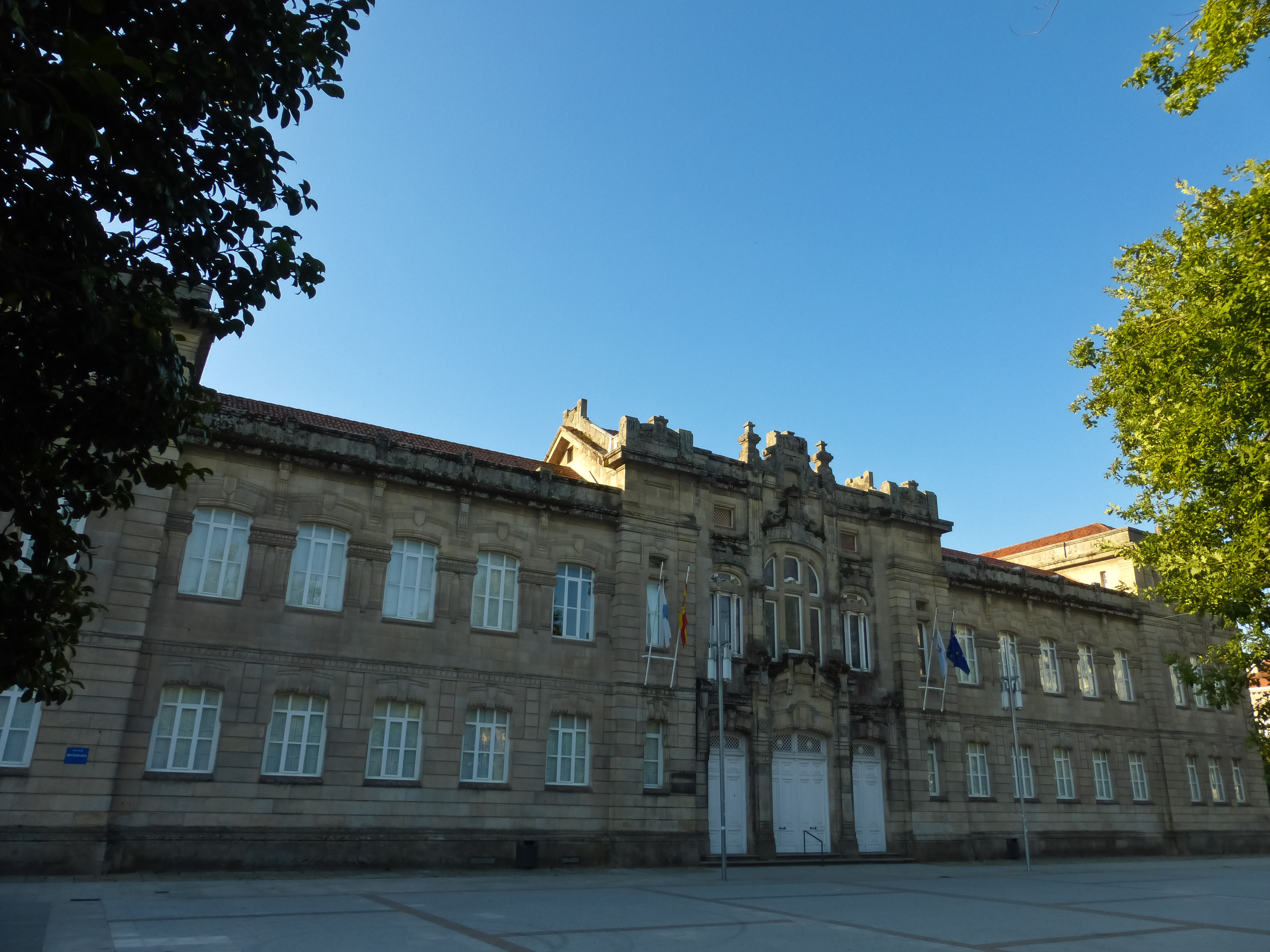
Main façade

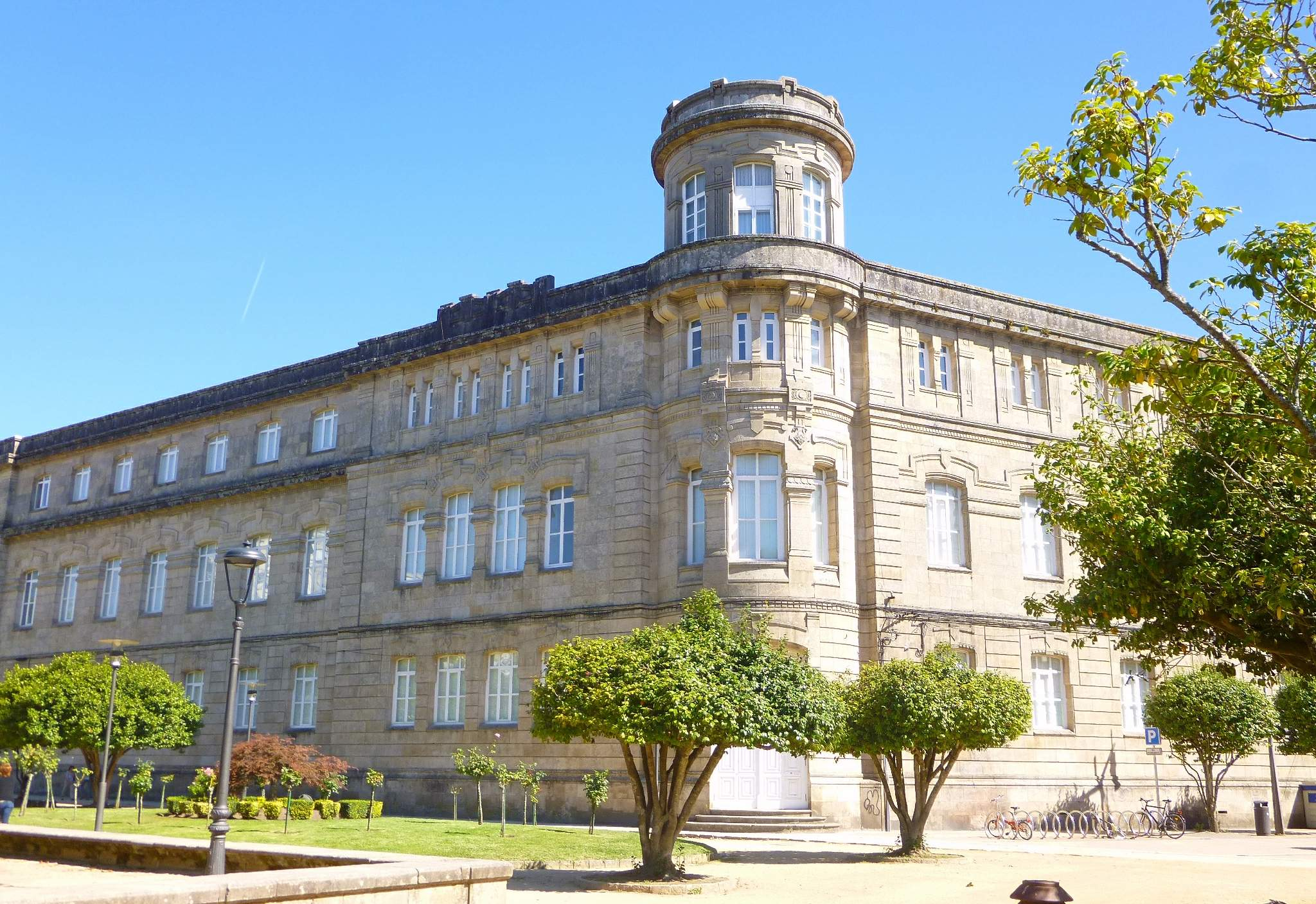
Rear façade and tower

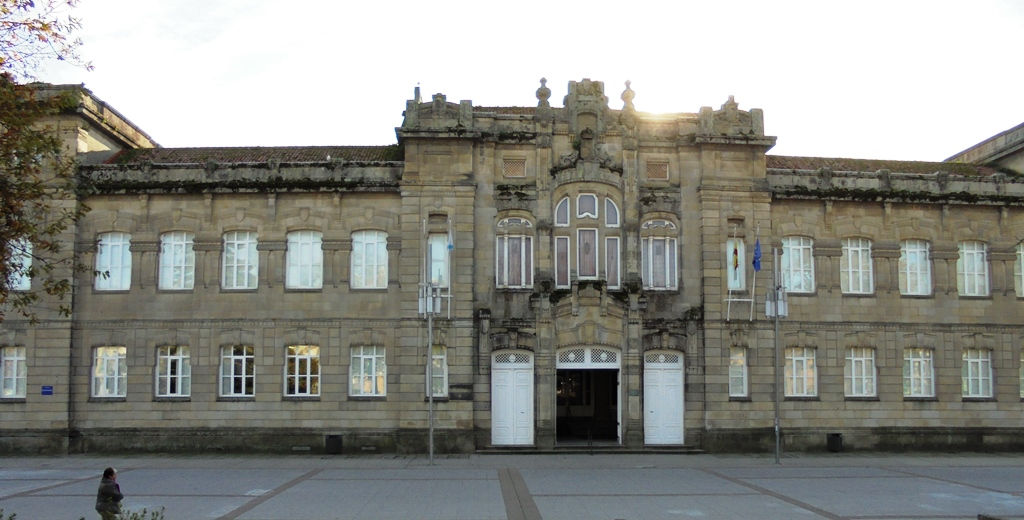
Main façade

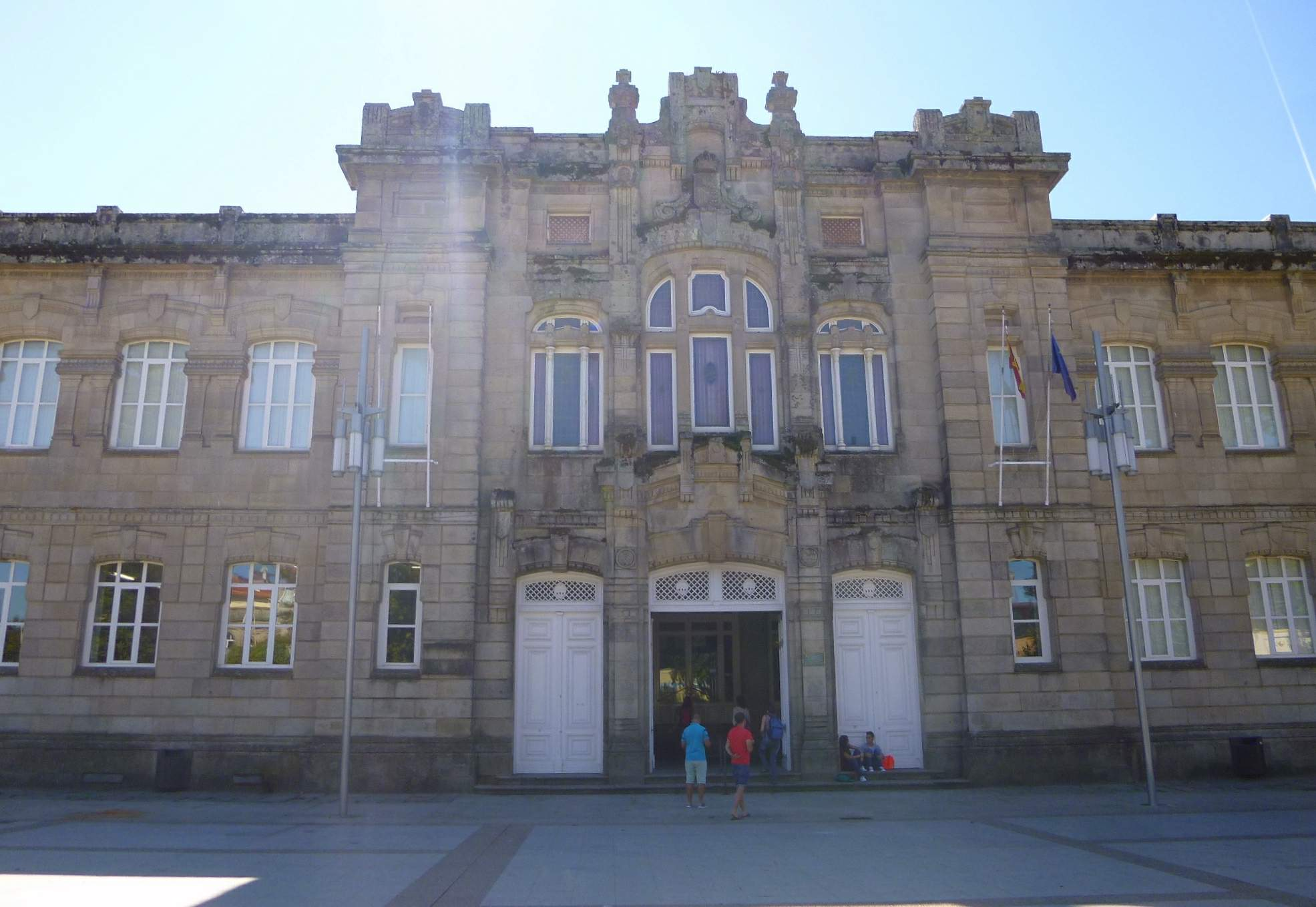
Entrance

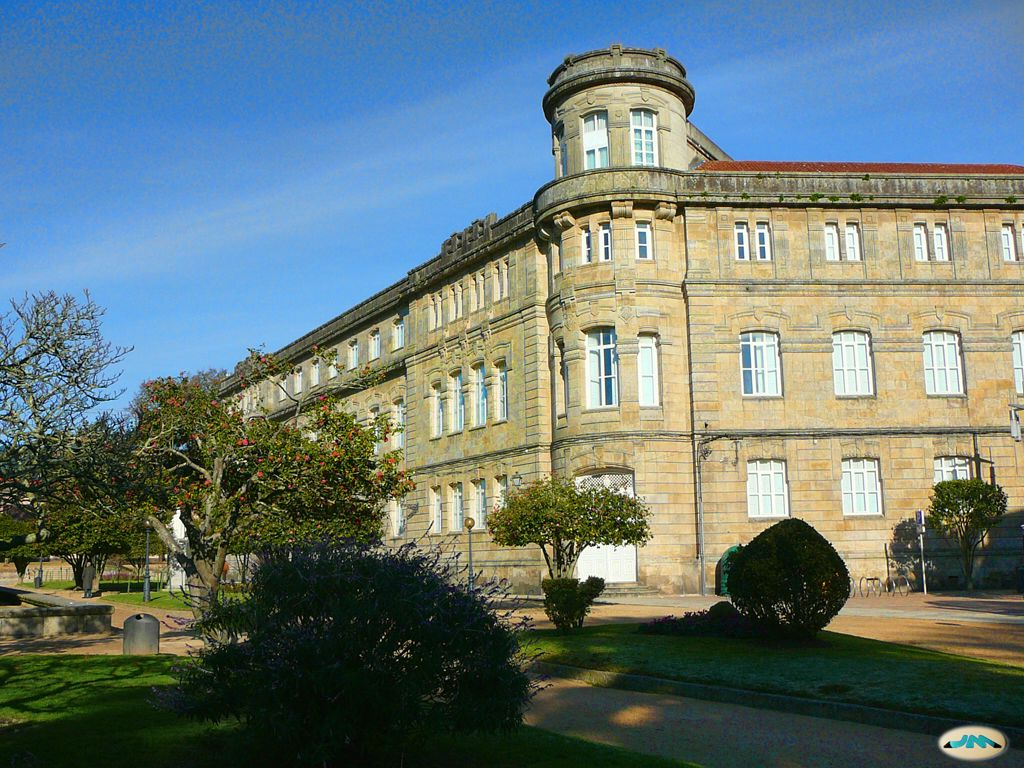
Side and rear façades

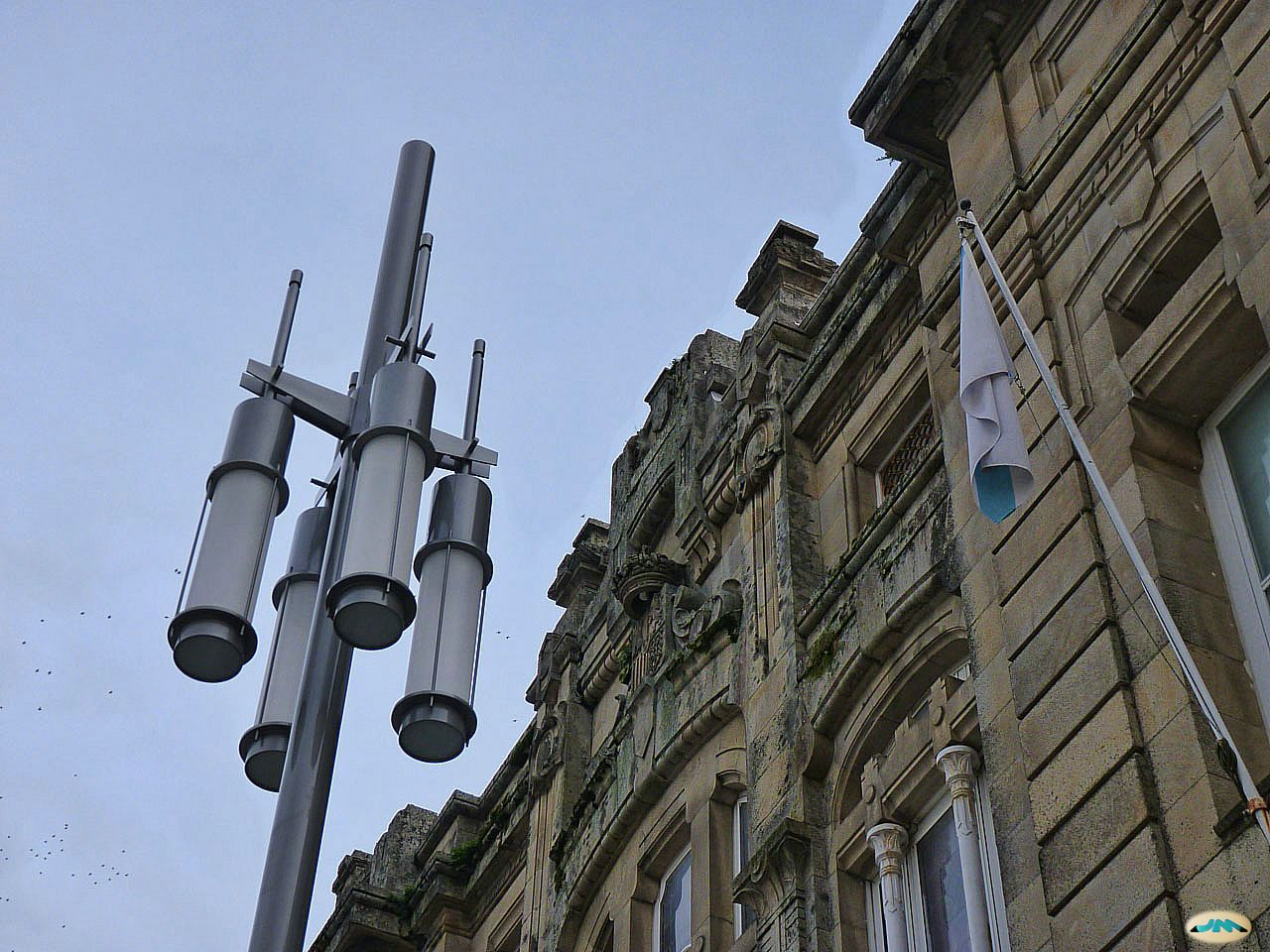
Detail of the façade

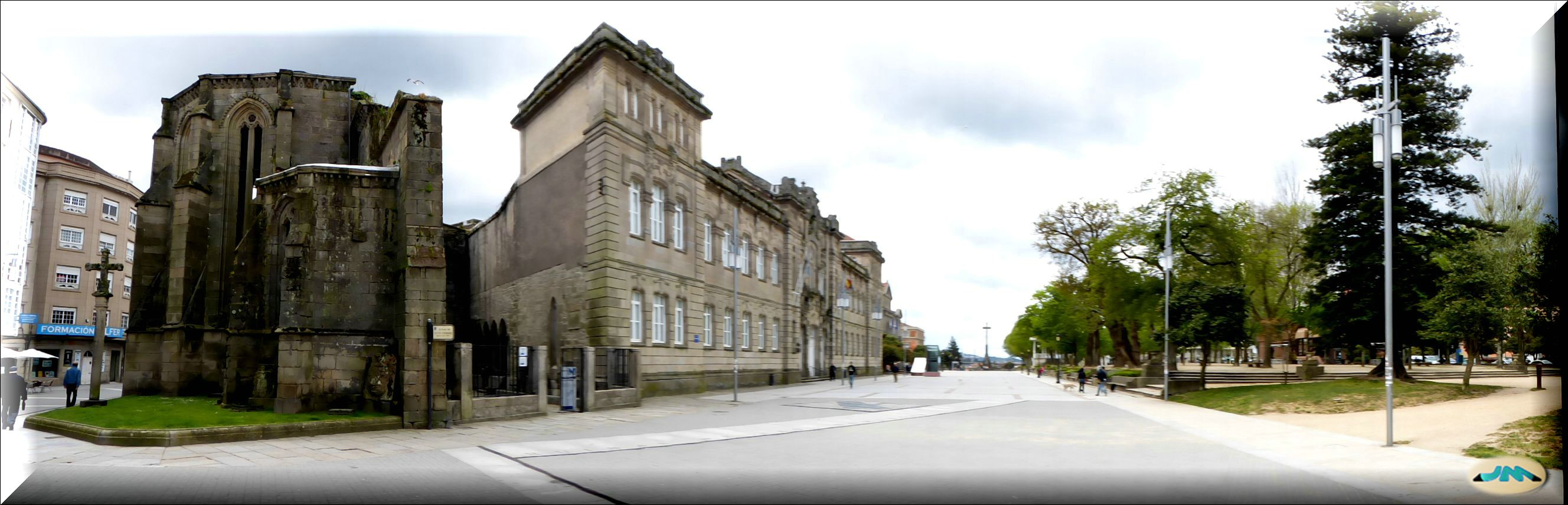
Valle-Inclán High School next to the Ruins of San Domingo

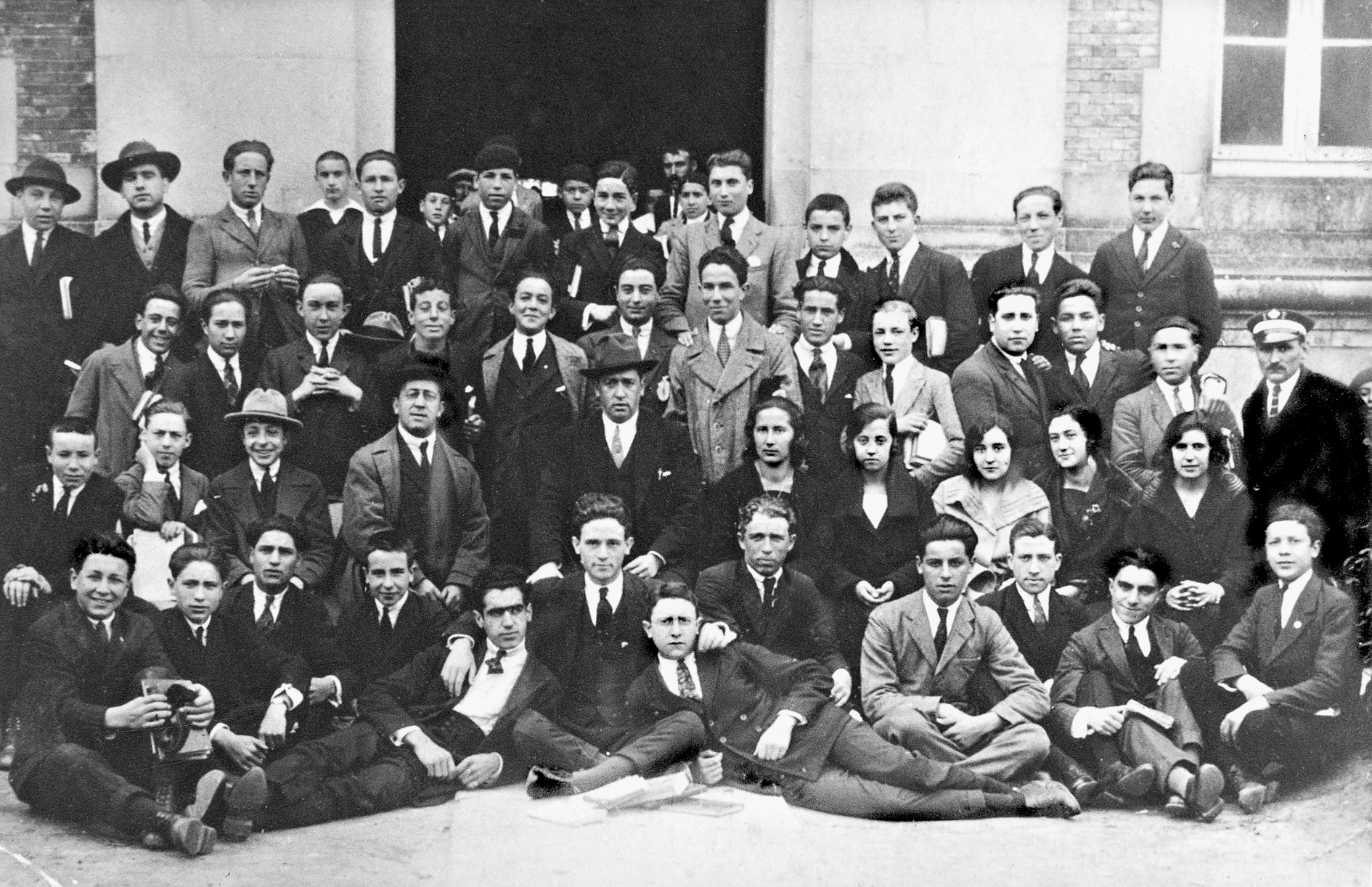
Students in 1923

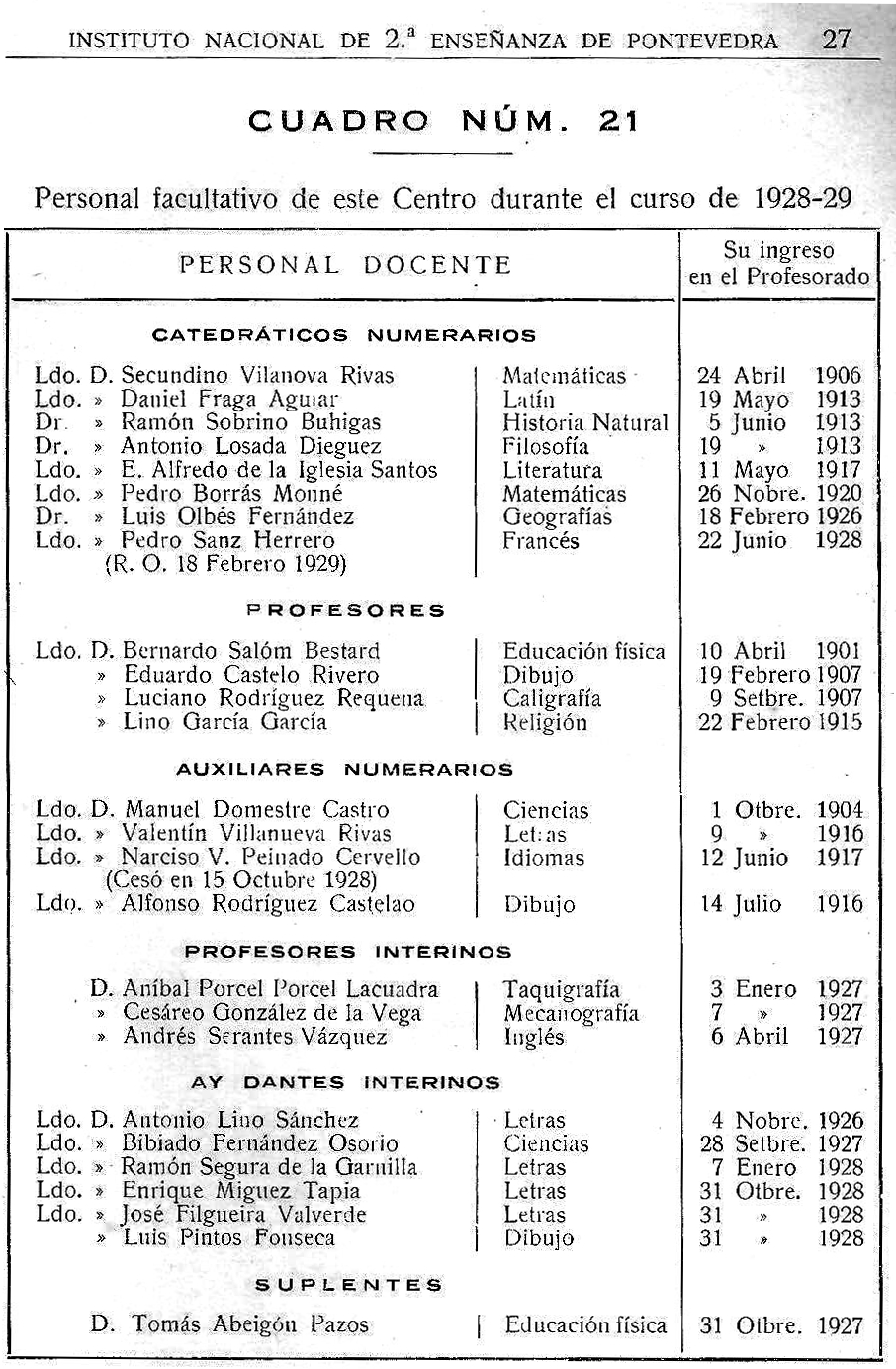
Teachers and subjects for the school year 1928–1929, including Castelao as drawing teacher

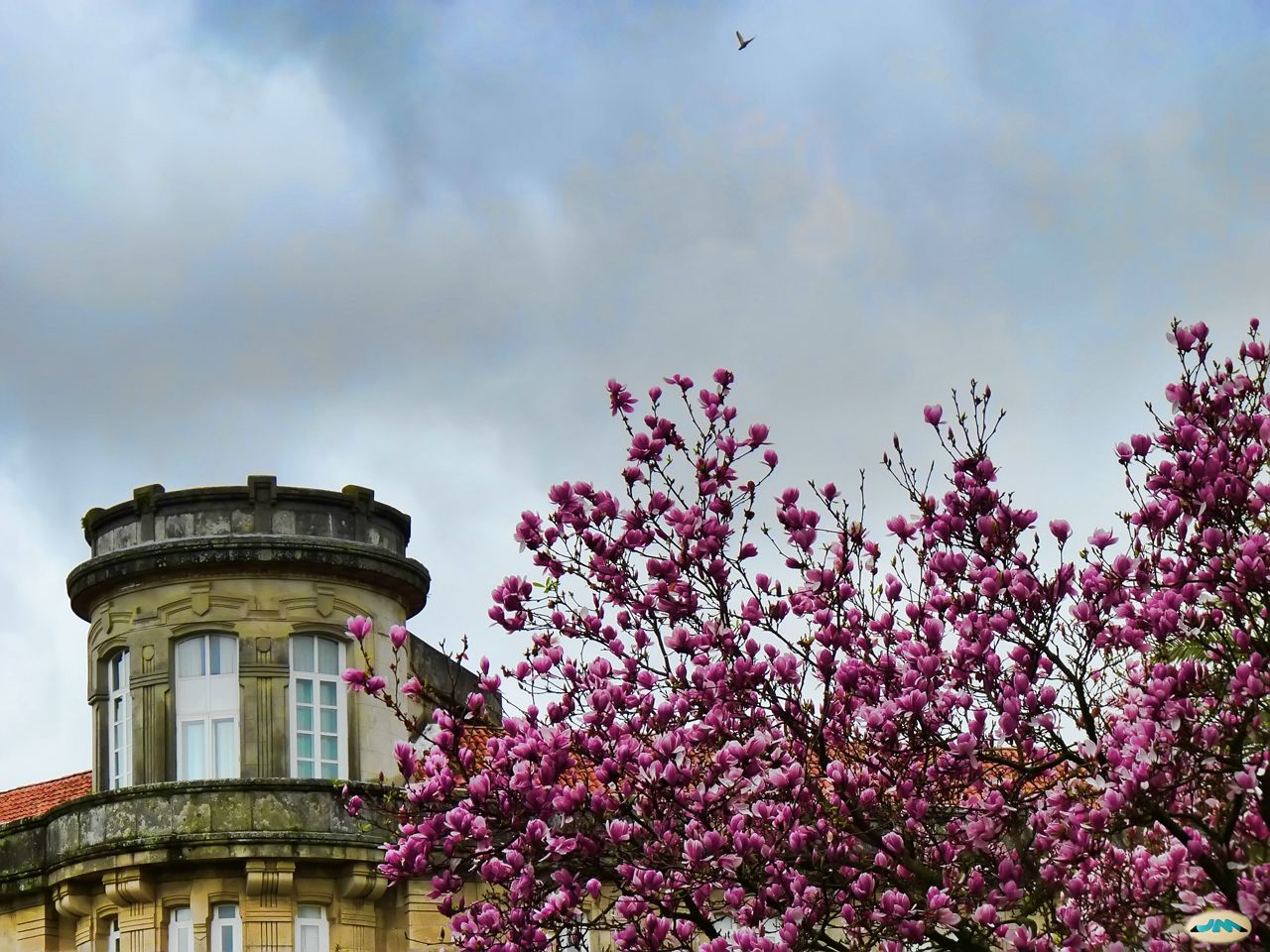
High school tower

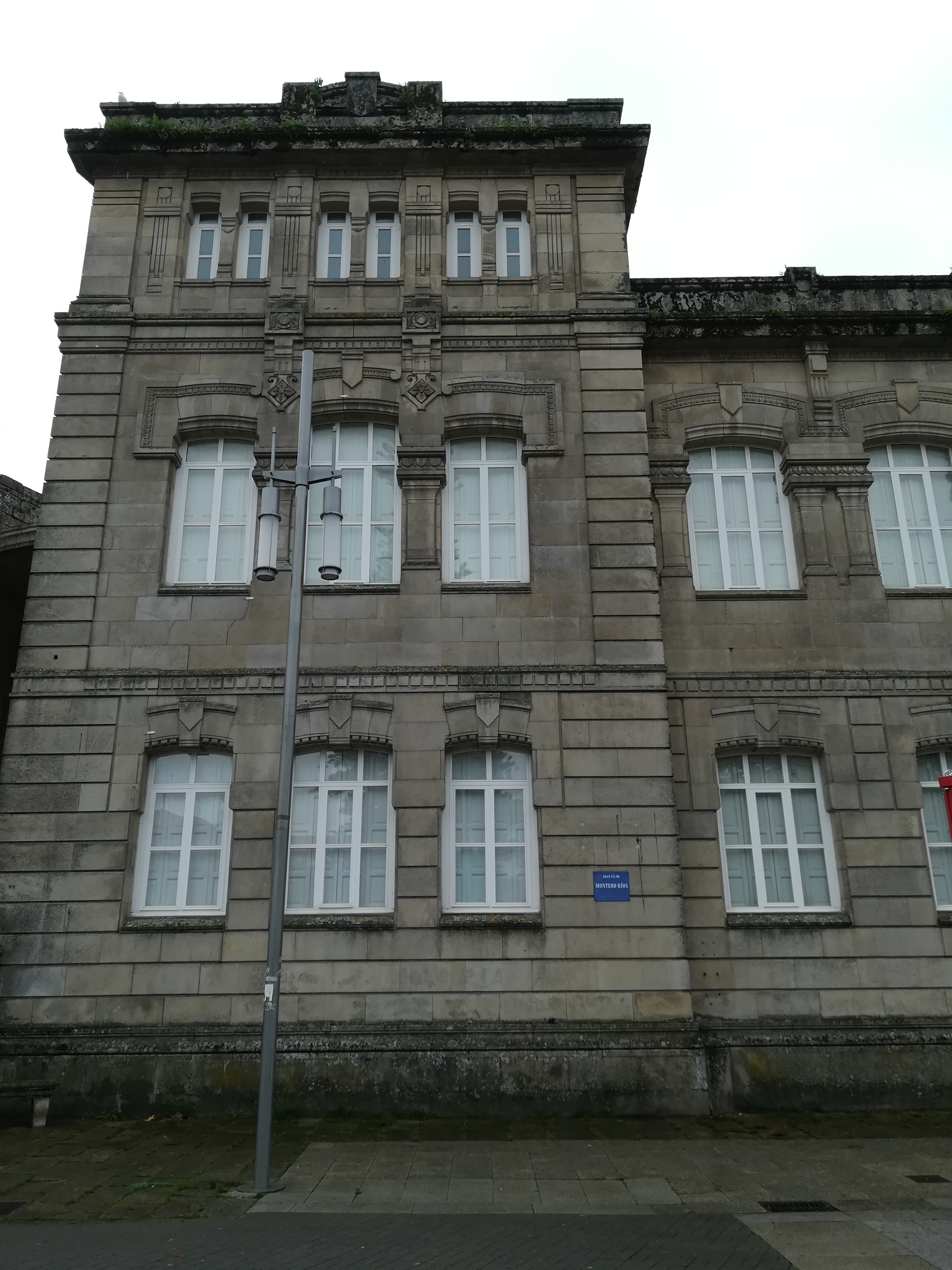

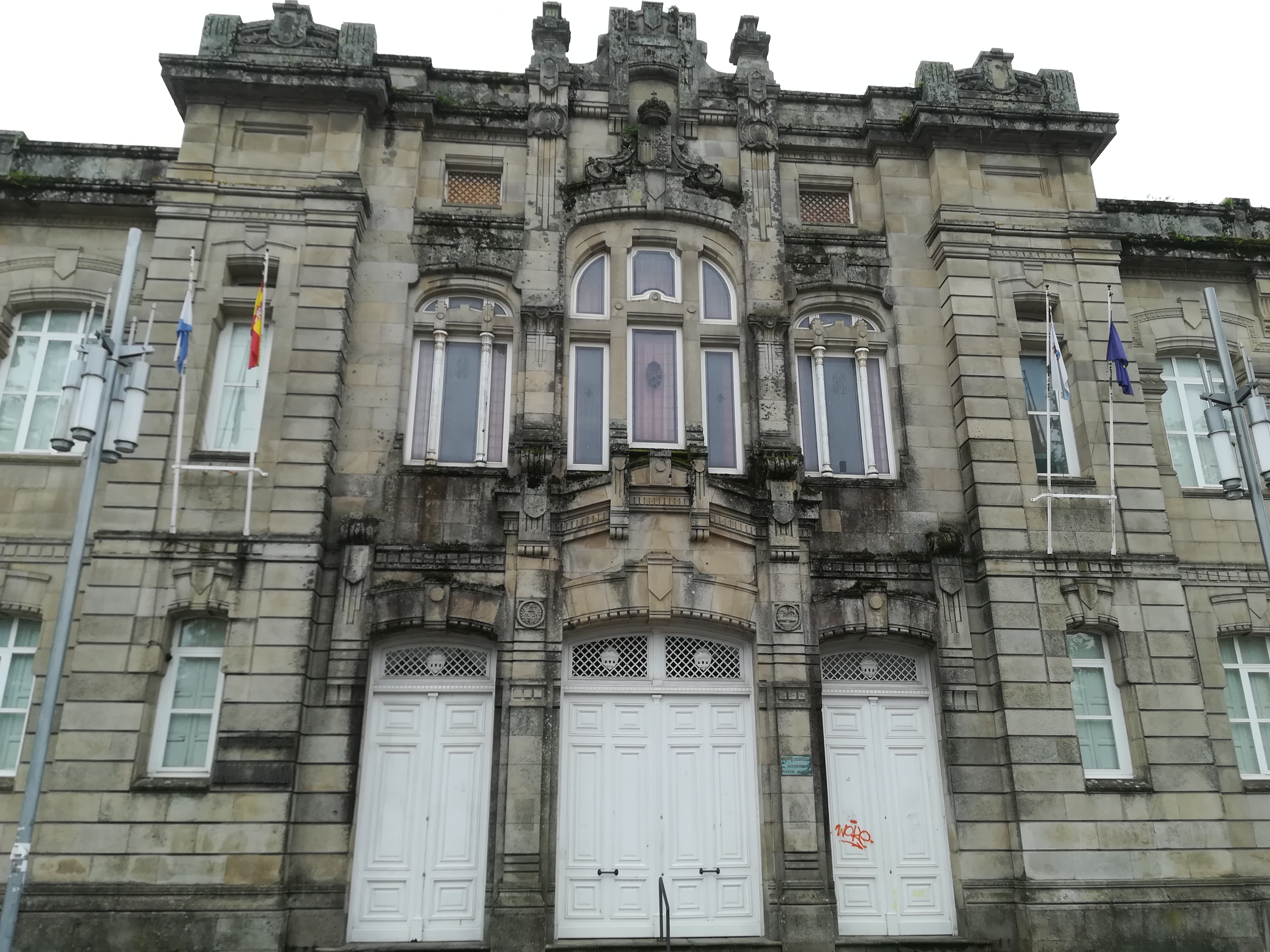

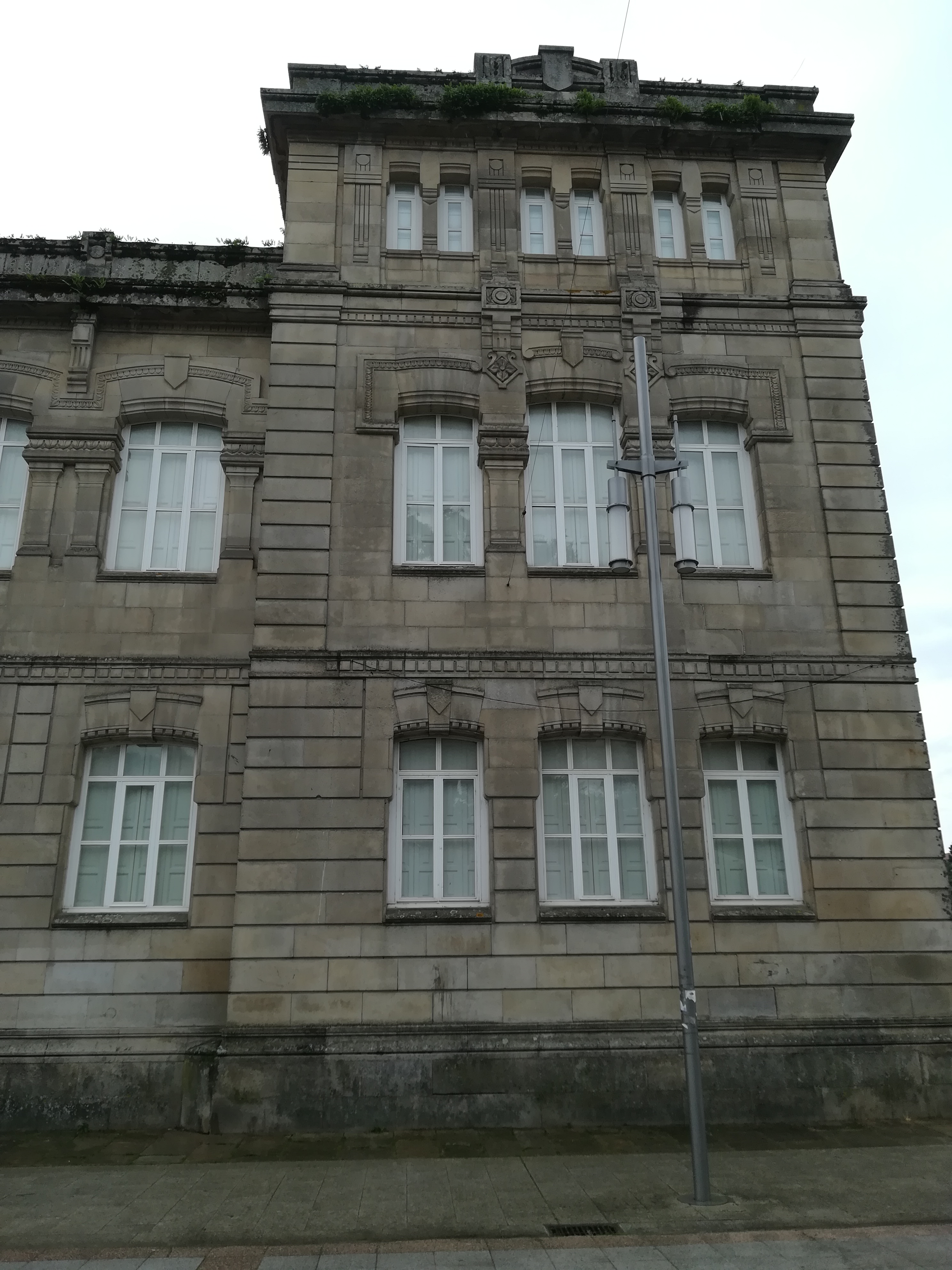

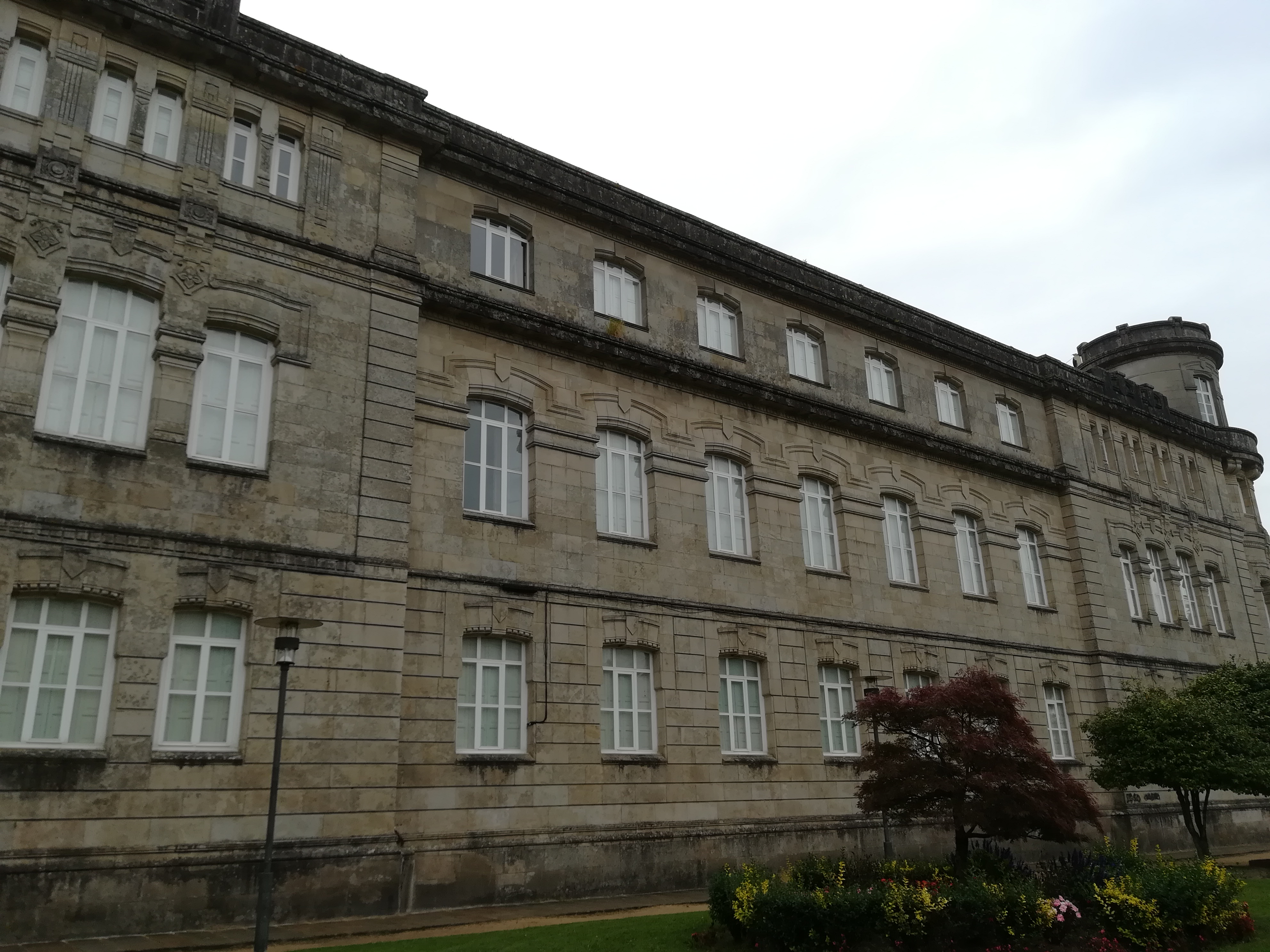

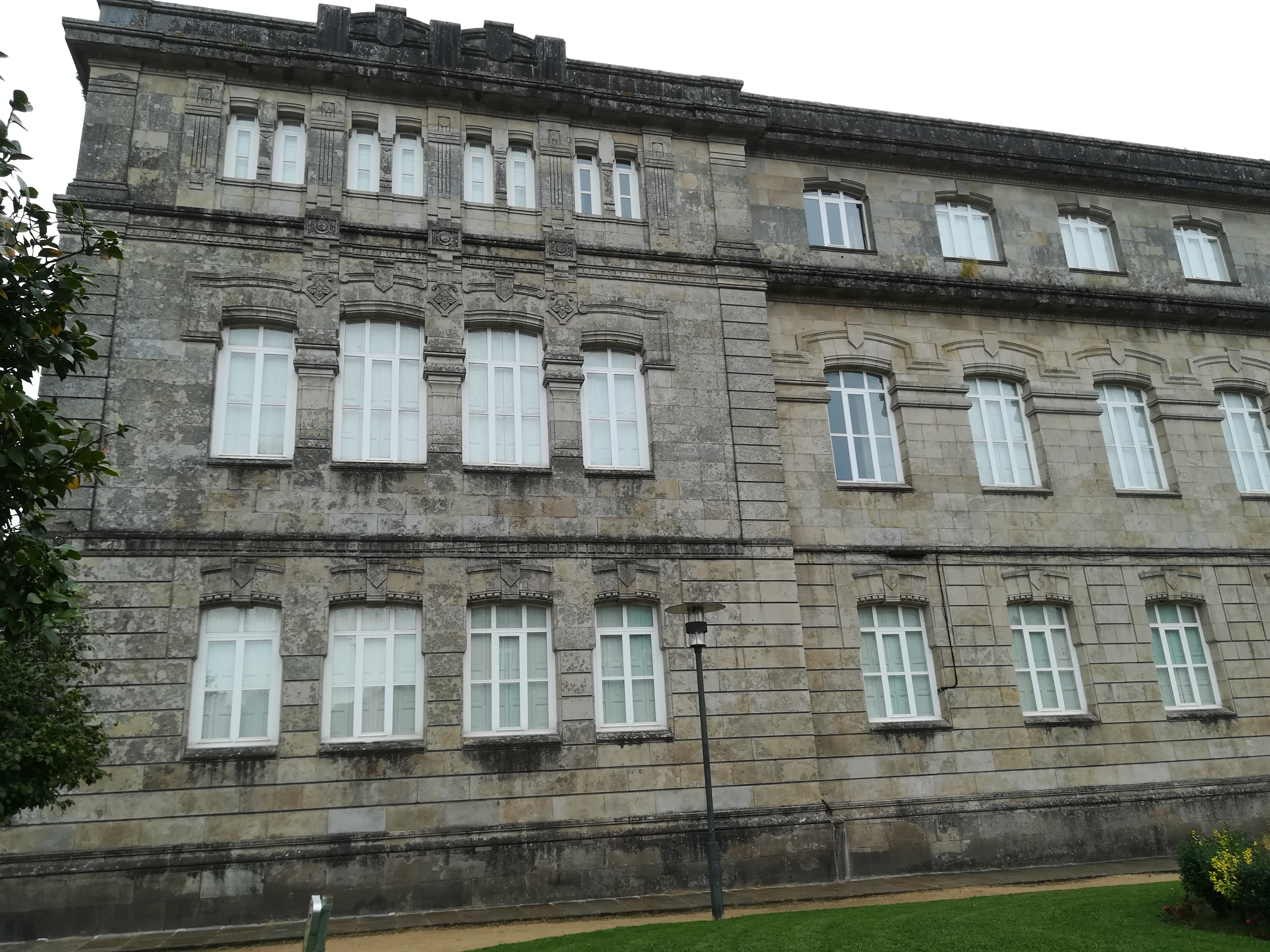

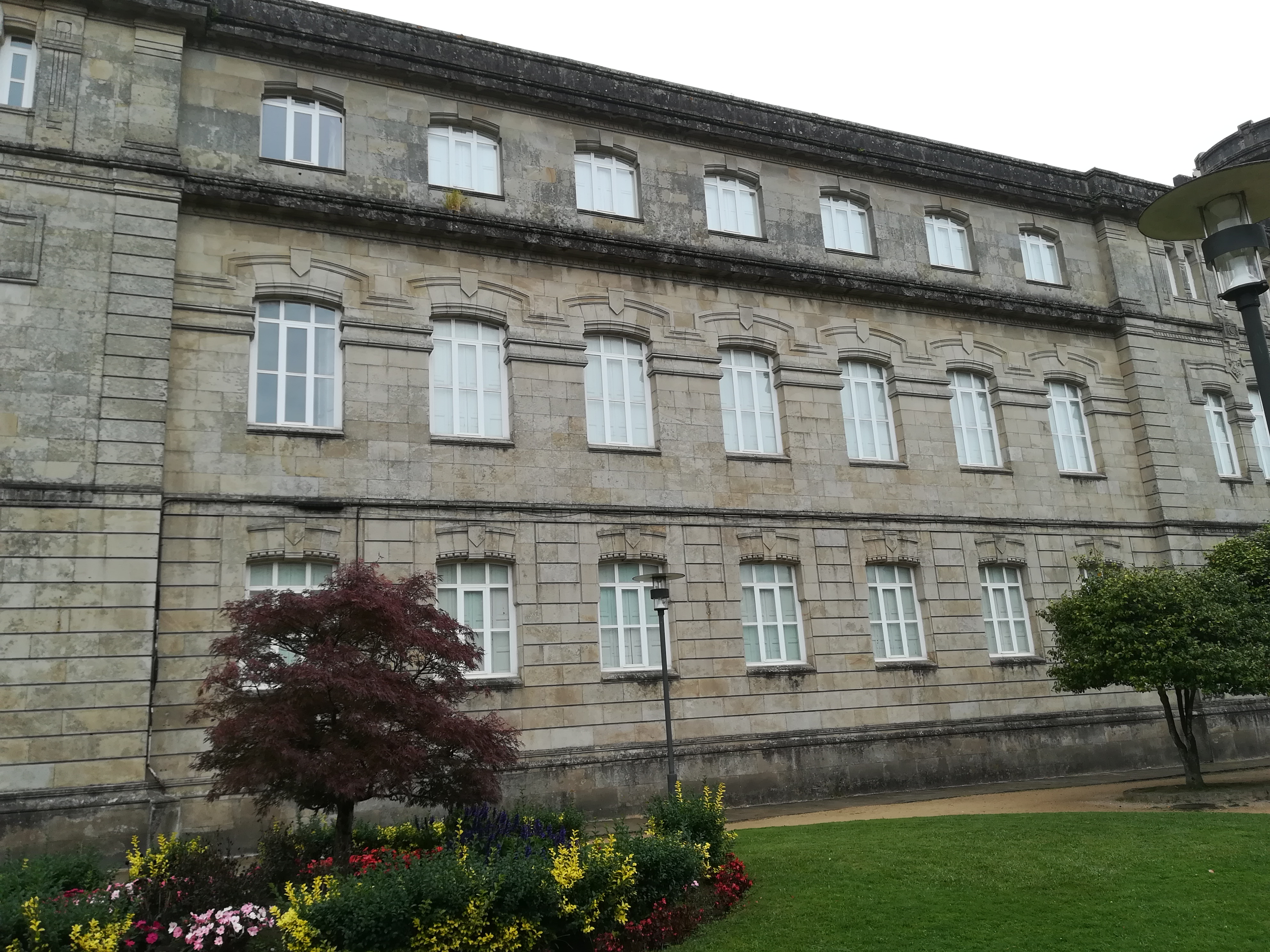

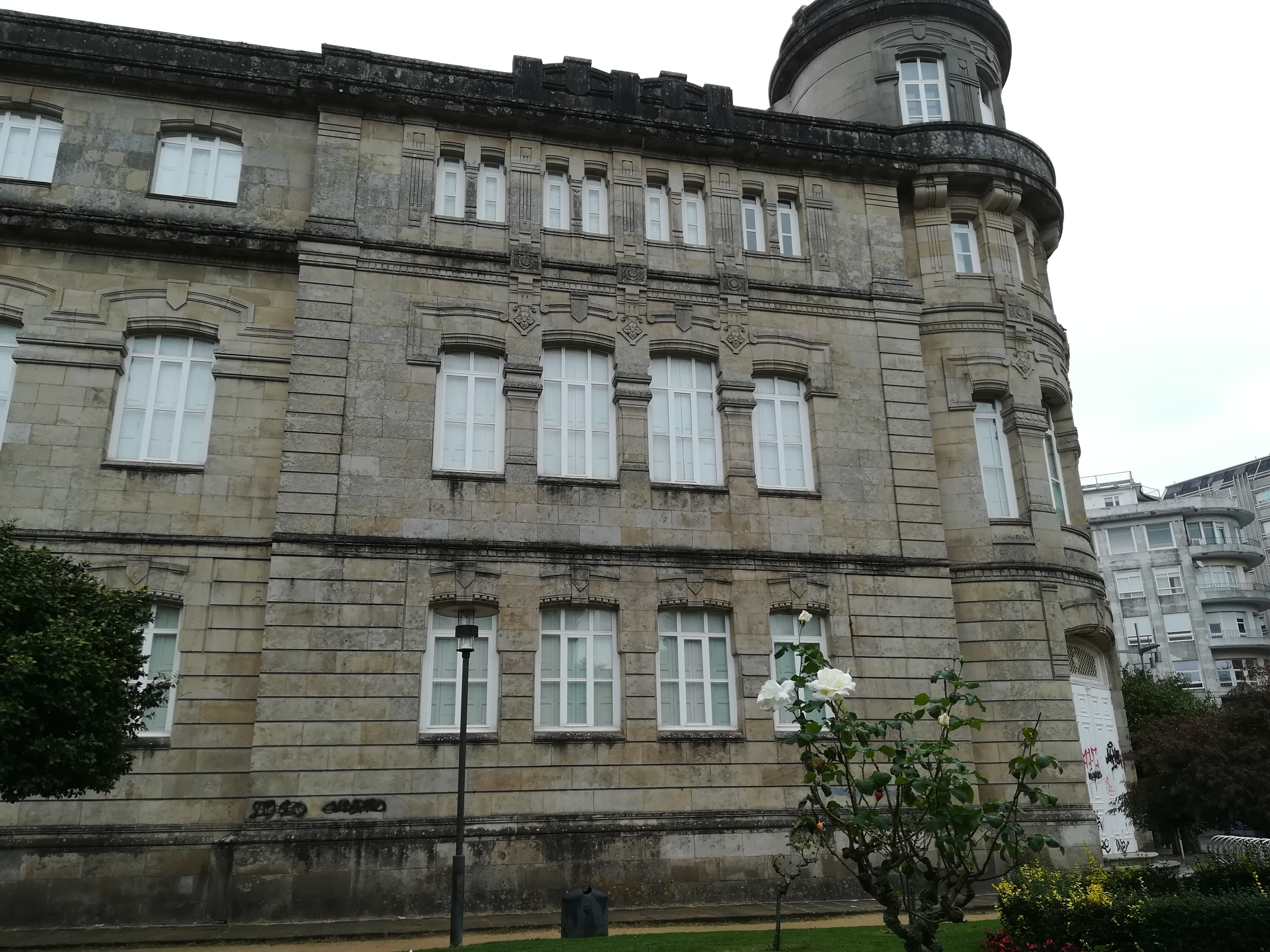

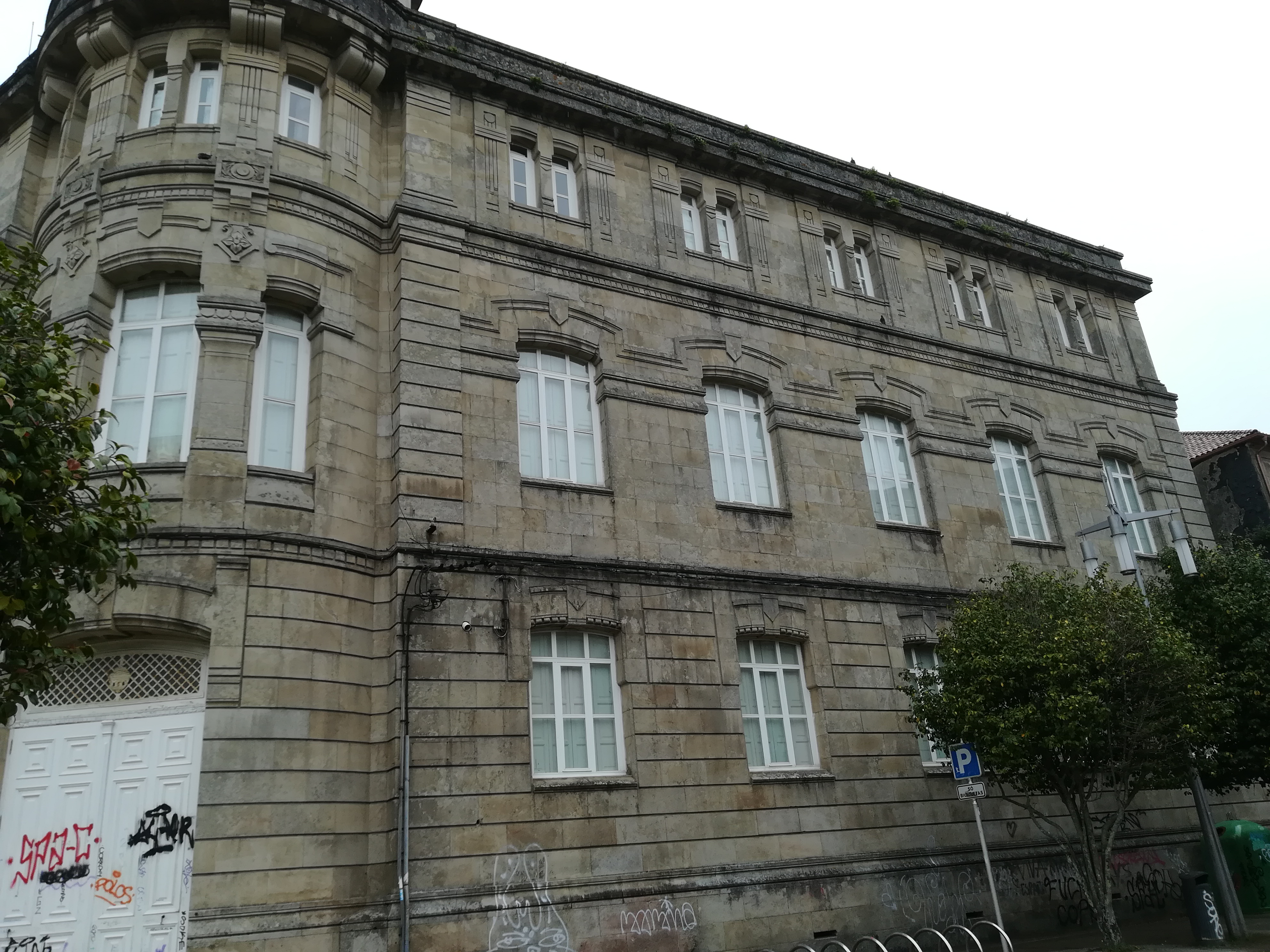

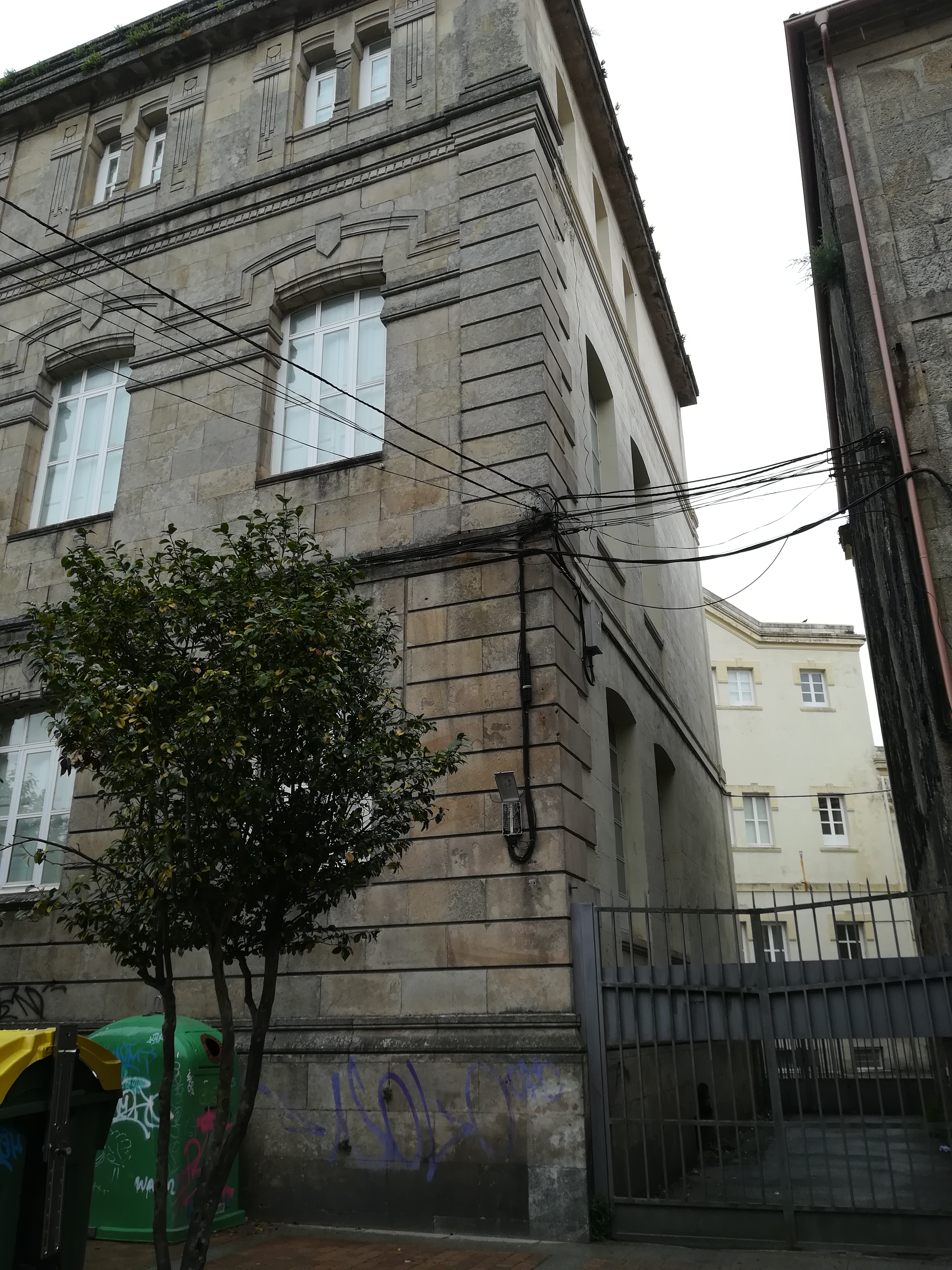

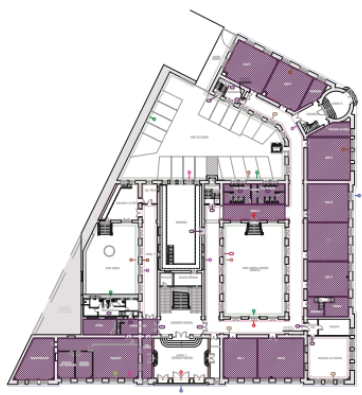
Plan of the high school building, ground floor

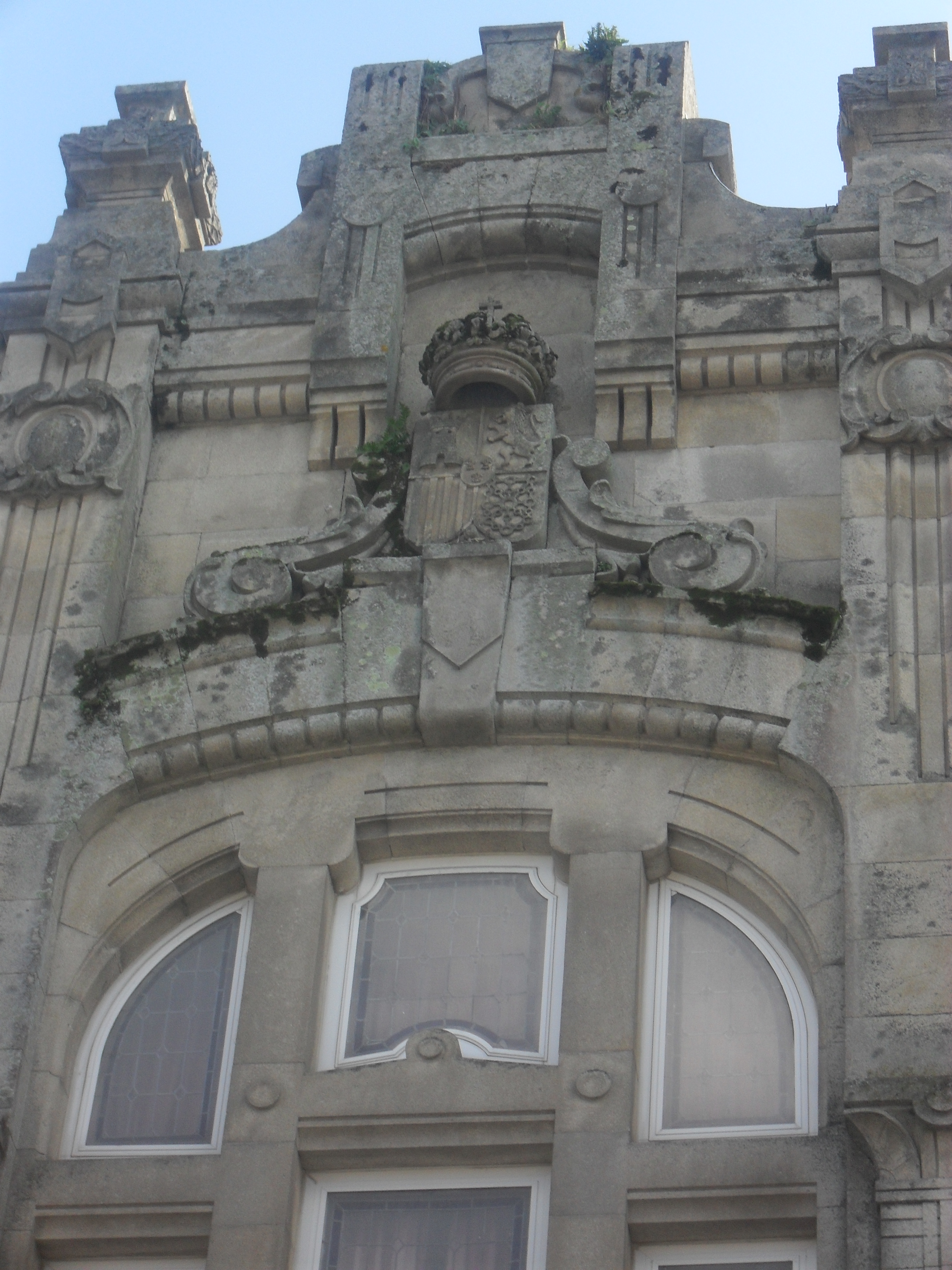

== See also ==
=== Related articles ===
- Gran Vía de Montero Ríos
- Eclecticism in architecture
- Bank of Spain Building (Pontevedra)
- Saint Ferdinand Barracks

== Bibliography ==
- Aganzo, Carlos (2010). Pontevedra. Ciudades con encanto (in Spanish). Madrid: El País-Aguilar. p. 94. ISBN 978-8403509344.
- Fontoira Surís, Rafael (2009). Pontevedra monumental (in Galician). Pontevedra: Diputación Provincial de Pontevedra. p. 413. ISBN 978-84-8457-327-2.
- Fortes, Xosé (1997). O Instituto de Pontevedra. Século e medio de historia. 1845-1995 (in Galician). Pontevedra: Deputación Provincial de Pontevedra. ISBN 978-8488363961.
- Riveiro Tobío, Elvira (2008). Descubrir Pontevedra (in Spanish). Pontevedra: Edicións do Cumio. p. 47. ISBN 9788482890852.
- El nuevo edificio para Instituto General y Técnico, de Pontevedra (in Spanish). Madrid: La Construcción Moderna Año XXVI.— Núm. 2. 1928. p. 20. ISSN 1889-8408.

=== External links ===
- Instituto Valle-Inclán, on the website Galicia Tourism
- Instituto Valle-Inclán on the website Xunta de Galicia
