= Pazo de Castro Monteagudo =

Mansion in Pontevedra, Spain

Castro Monteagudo Palace
- Pazo de Castro Monteagudo
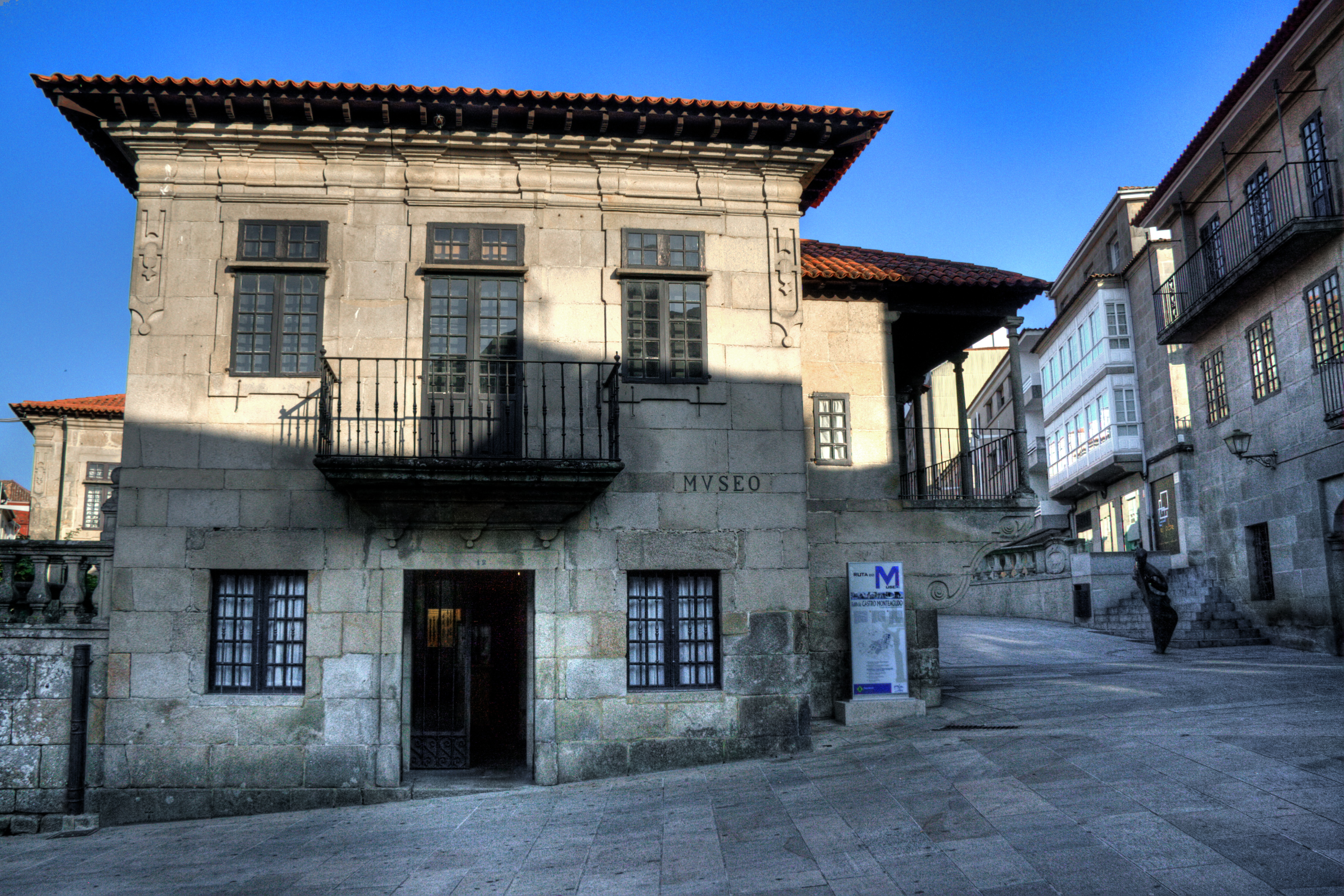
- Interactive map of the Castro Monteagudo Palace area

General information
- Type: Pazo
- Location: Pontevedra, Galicia, Spain
- Coordinates: 42°25′57.1″N 8°38′34.9″W
- Completed: 1760
- Owner: Pontevedra Museum
- Operator: Pontevedra Museum

Technical details
- Floor count: 2

Website
- Official Site

The Pazo de Castro Monteagudo, is an 18th-century baroque pazo in Pasantería Street, next to the Plaza de la Leña in the city of Pontevedra, Spain, in the heart of the old town.

== History ==
The pazo Castro Monteagudo was built in 1760, as indicated in a Latin document found during its renovation. Its promoter and owner was José de Castro Monteagudo, the first auditor of the maritime province of Pontevedra.

Later, the boys' school was set up on the upper floor, and the shop La Imperial, the restaurant La Flor and a carpentry workshop were located on the lower floor.

In 1928, the Pontevedra Museum bought it from its owner Casimiro Gómez Cobas for 52,000 pesetas to install the museum. This pazo became its first headquarters. Castelao, the museum's founding patron, participated in the ideas for its remodelling and adaptation to become a museum: he drew several designs for the interior distribution and for the upper balcony, which are still preserved. The building was opened to the public as a museum on 10 August 1929.

Work on enlarging the pazo began in April 1936. The part with an arch that connects it to the García Flórez pazo was added in 1943, according to the project of the architect Robustiano Fernández Cochón, who was also responsible for incorporating a tower into the pazo.

== Description ==
This urban mansion has a main façade on Pasantería Street with austere characteristics, with two windows and a central door with a balcony on the upper floor and an entrance door in the centre and two other windows on the ground floor.

On the south façade there is a remarkable balcony supported by large Modillions on which there are three stone columns supporting the roof. At the end of this façade, the pazo has a tower with several windows and a balcony that was added in the 20th century, as well as a stone coat of arms of Pontevedra. On the façade opening onto the inner garden, the coat of arms of Pontevedra can also be seen. The pazo has 739 square metres of constructed area.

The building houses collections of archaeology, pre-Roman and Roman silverware and Spanish, Italian and Flemish Gothic, Renaissance and Baroque painting from the 15th to the 18th century. Paintings by Pedro Berruguete, Juan Correa de Vivar, Eugenio Cajés and Juan Pantoja de la Cruz, among others, are on display.

After its renovation approved in 2022, the interior spaces will be diaphanous and free of obstacles, leaving only the original load-bearing walls that will give it a unified appearance. The pazo will also have a wide underground connection with the pazo de García Flórez.

== Gallery ==
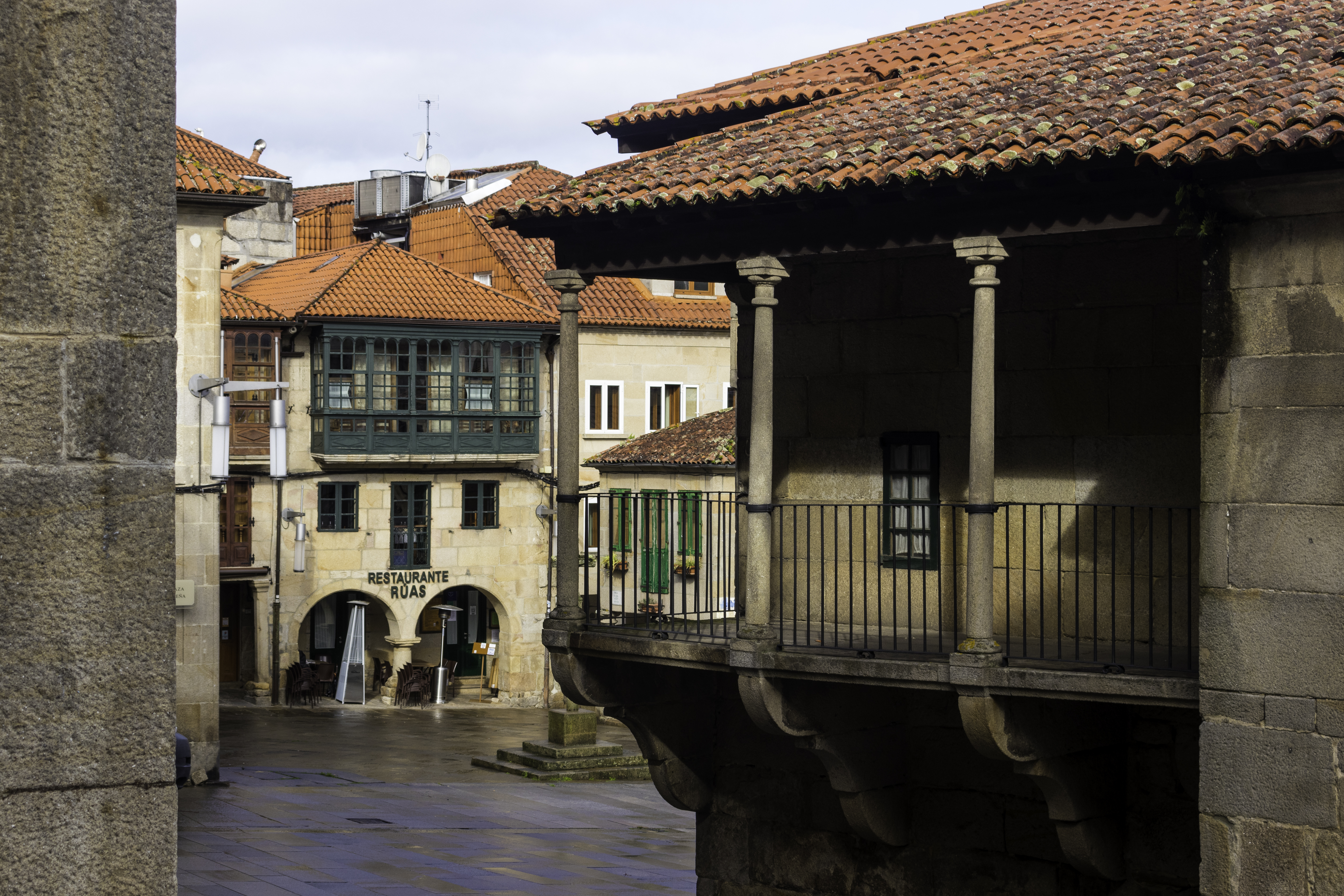
Balcony and modillions on the south façade

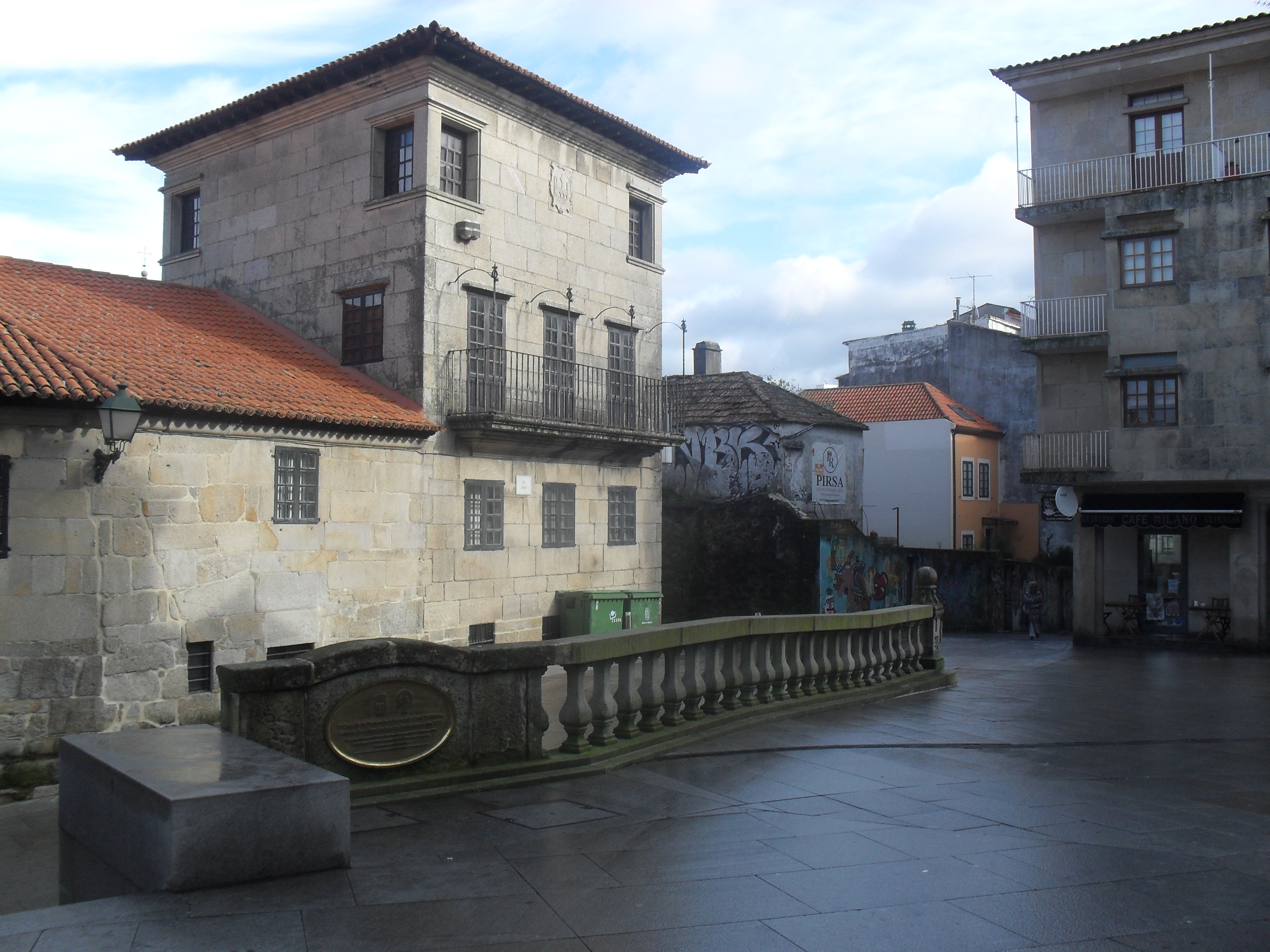
Tower

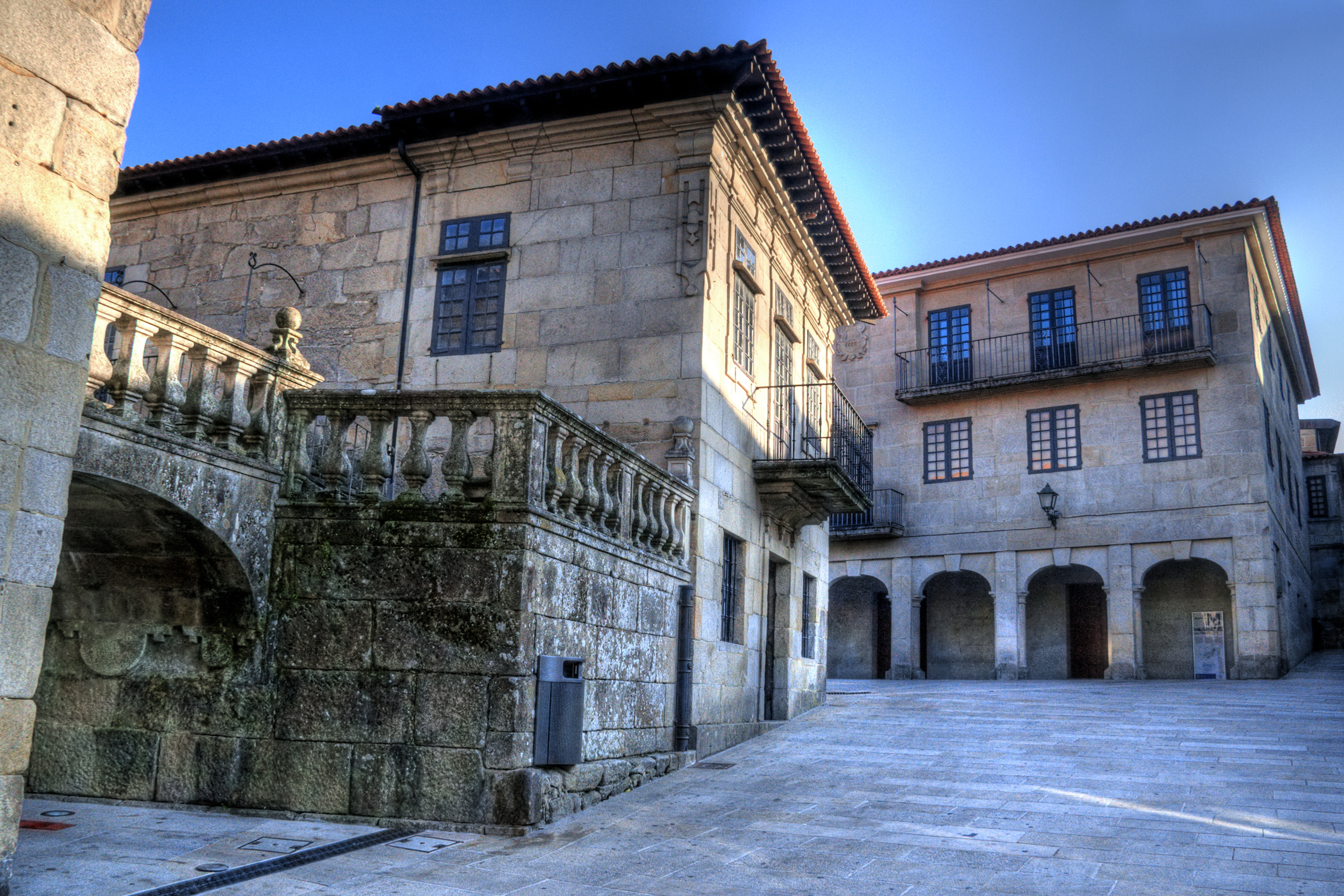
Arc and bridge added in 1943

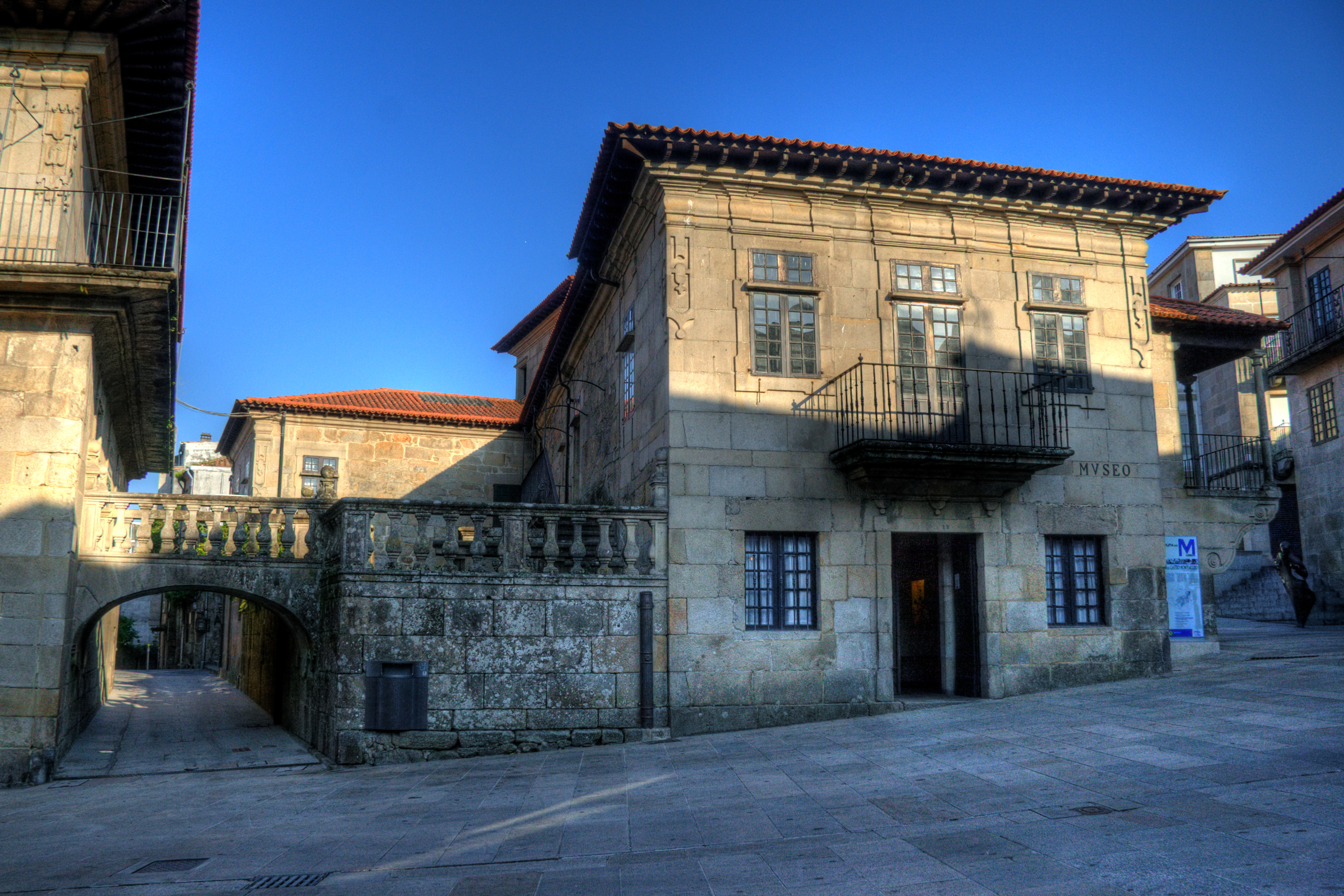
Main façade

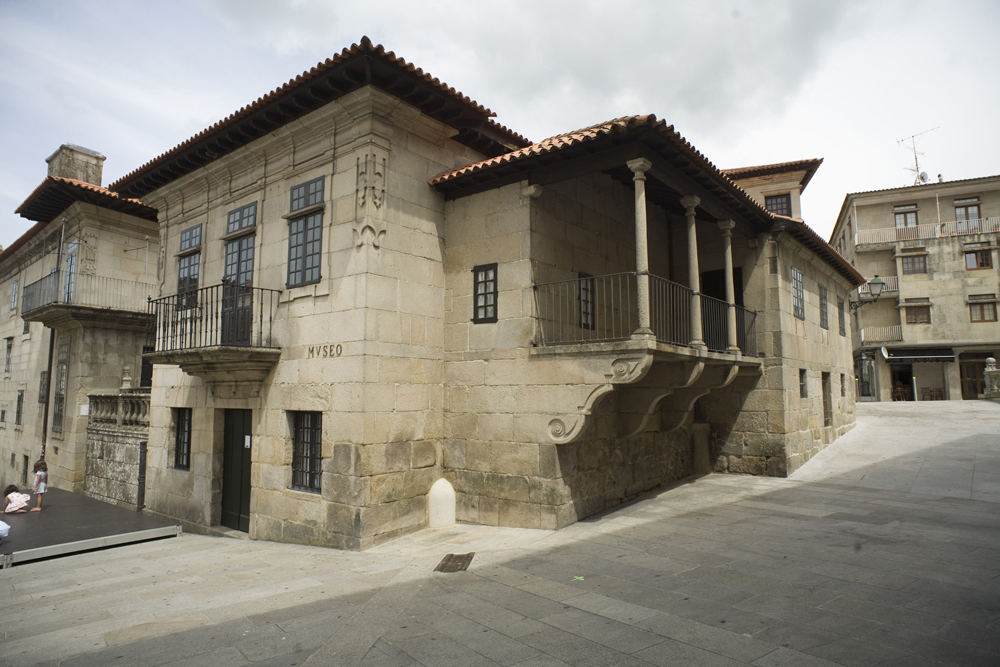
Façade and balcony

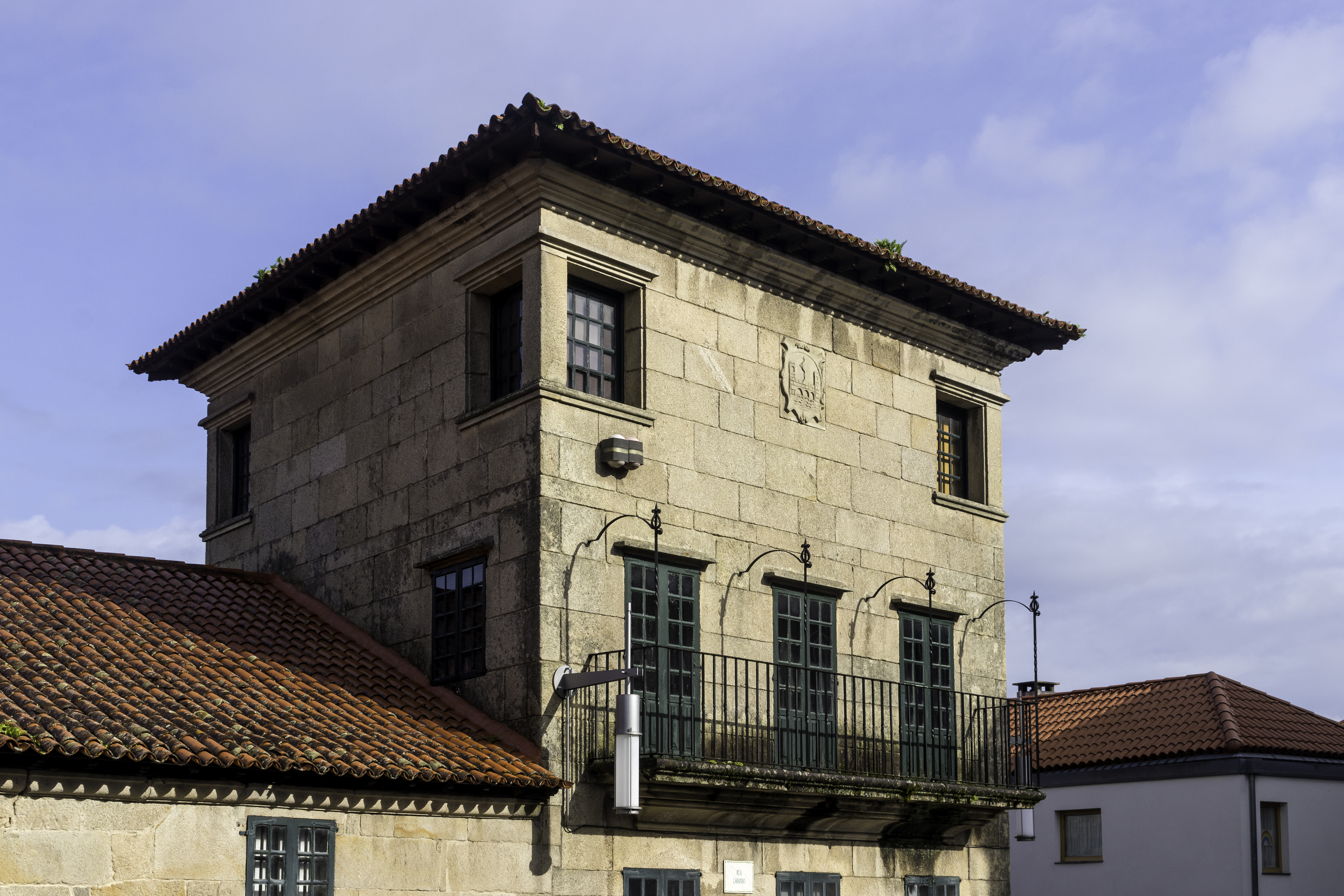
Tower

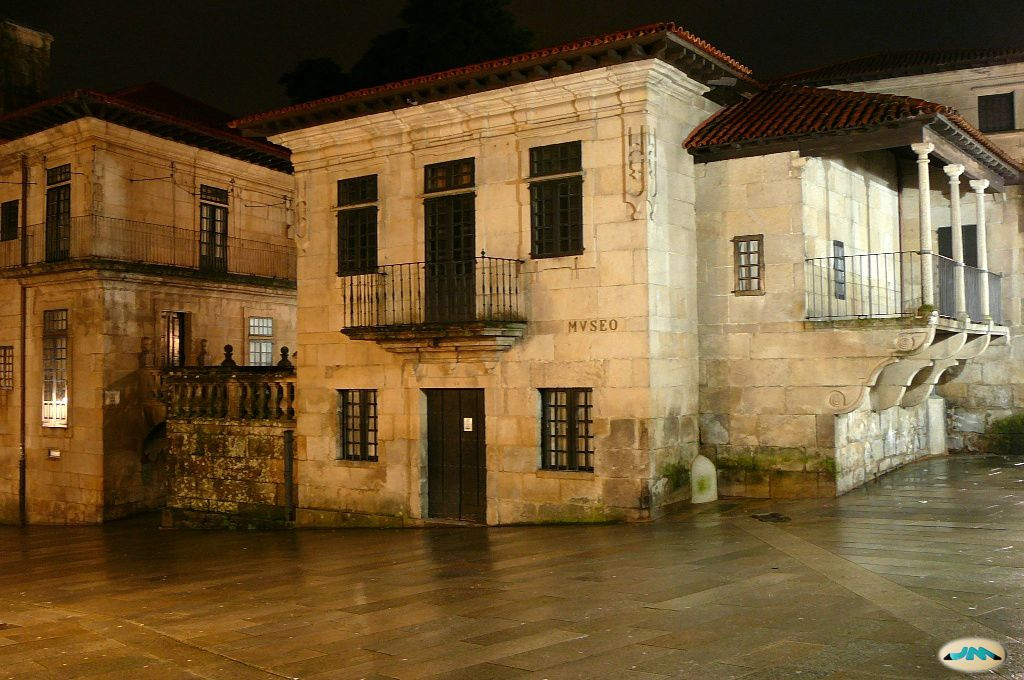
The pazo at night

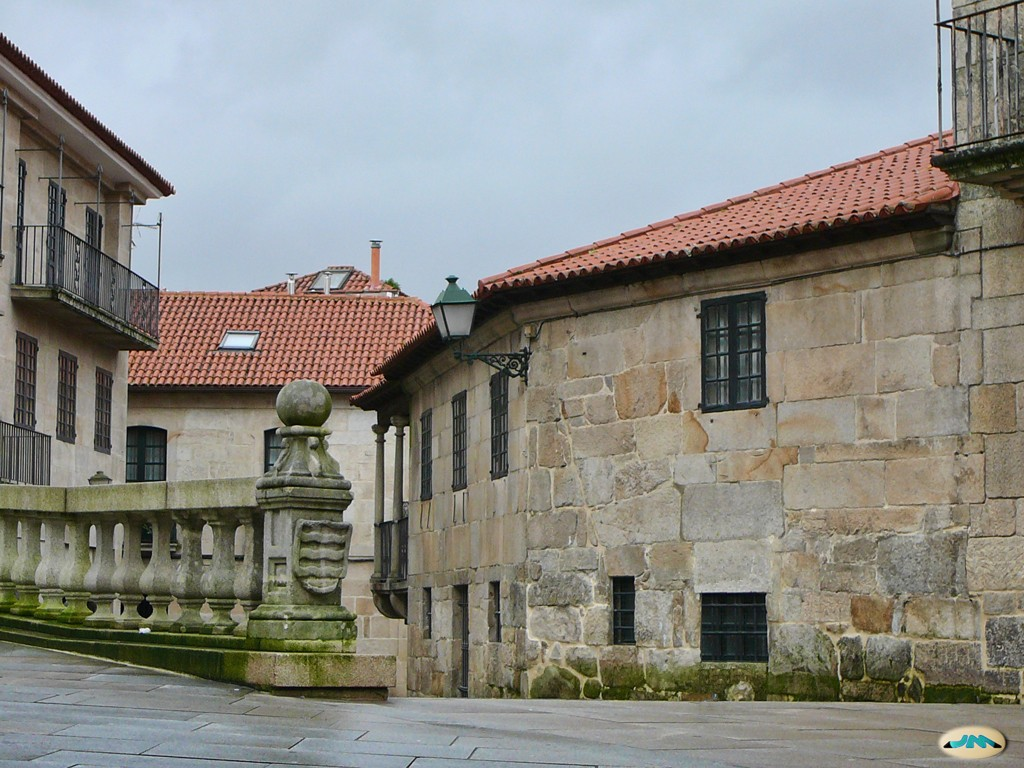
South façade

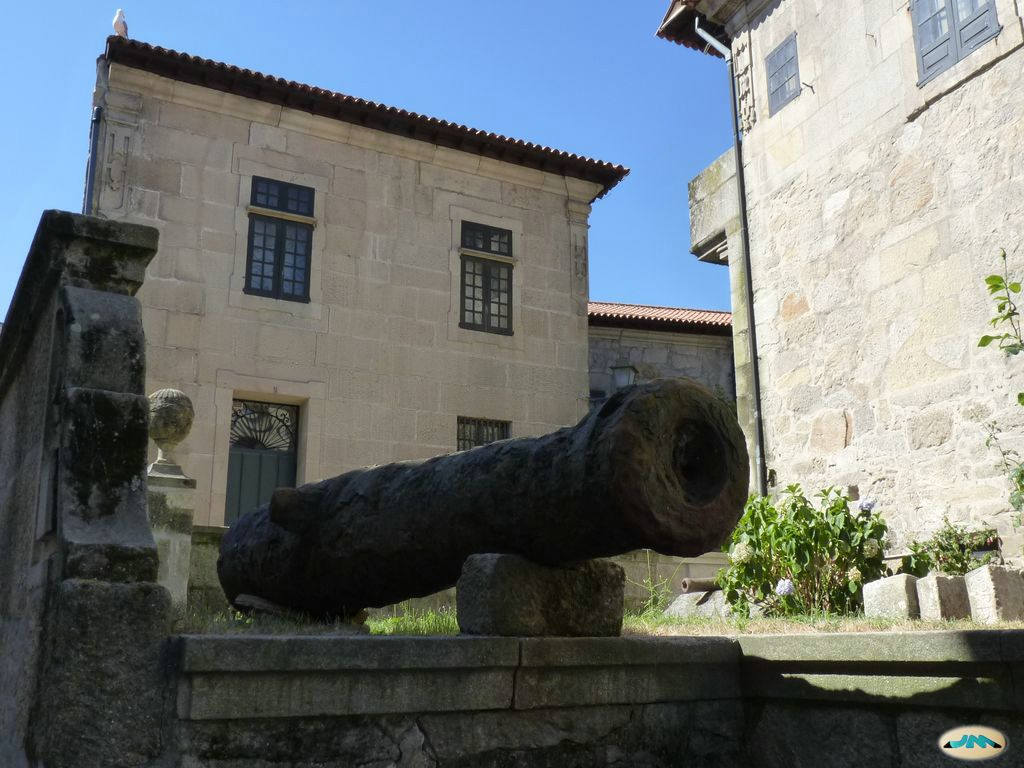
North façade

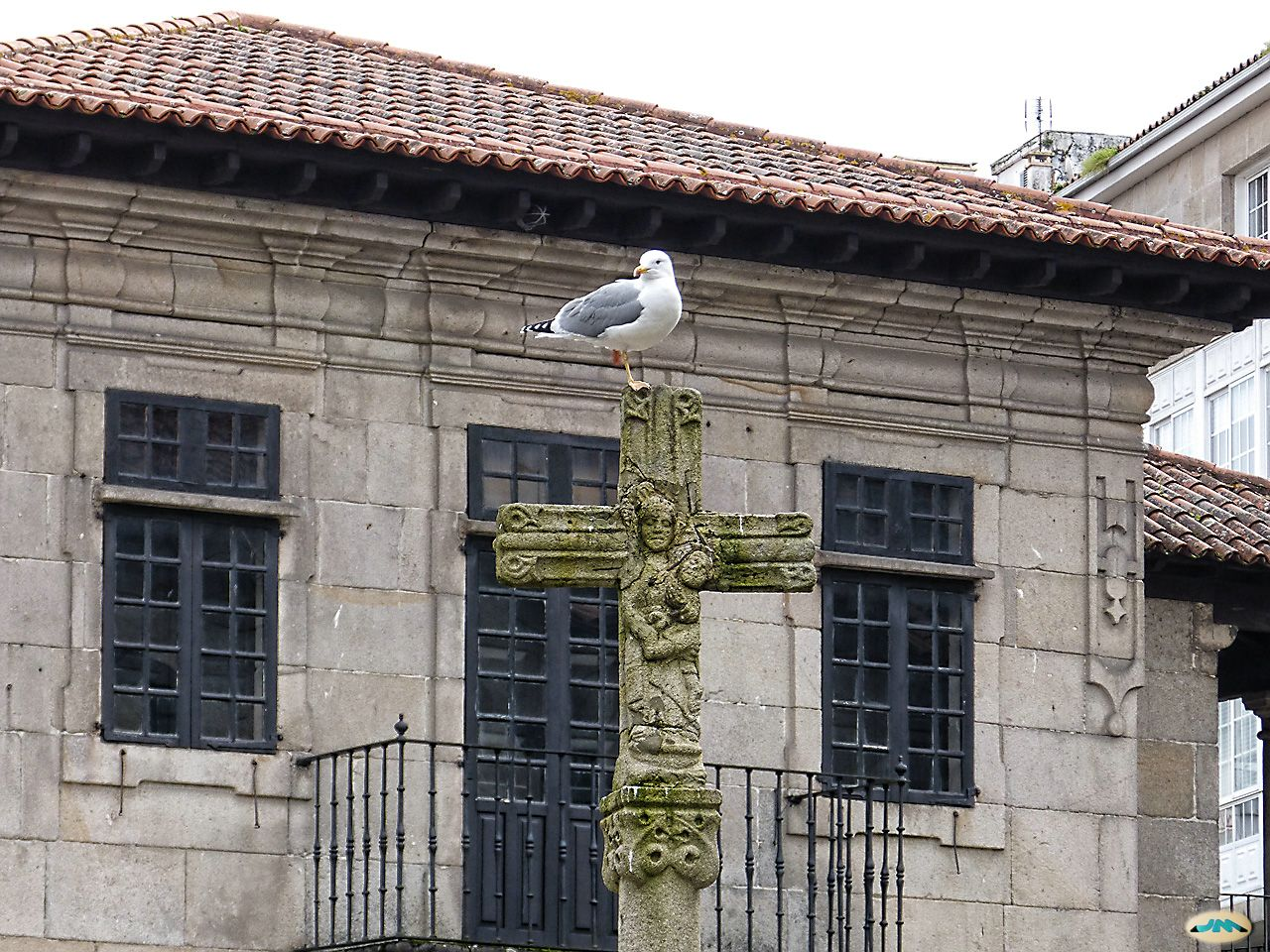

== See also ==
=== Bibliography ===
- Aganzo, Carlos (2010). Pontevedra. Ciudades con encanto (in Spanish). Madrid: El País-Aguilar. pp. 54–55. ISBN 978-8403509344.
- Fontoira Surís, Rafael (2009). Pontevedra monumental (in Spanish). Pontevedra: Diputación Provincial de Pontevedra. pp. 310–311. ISBN 978-84-8457-327-2.
- Riveiro Tobío, Elvira (2008). Descubrir Pontevedra (in Spanish). Pontevedra: Edicións do Cumio. p. 61. ISBN 9788482890852.

=== Related articles ===
- Pontevedra Museum
- Pazo de García Flórez

=== External links ===
- Castro Monteagudo building of the Pontevedra Museum
- on the website Rias Baixas Tourism
