= Plaza de la Leña =

Picturesque medieval square in Pontevedra, Spain

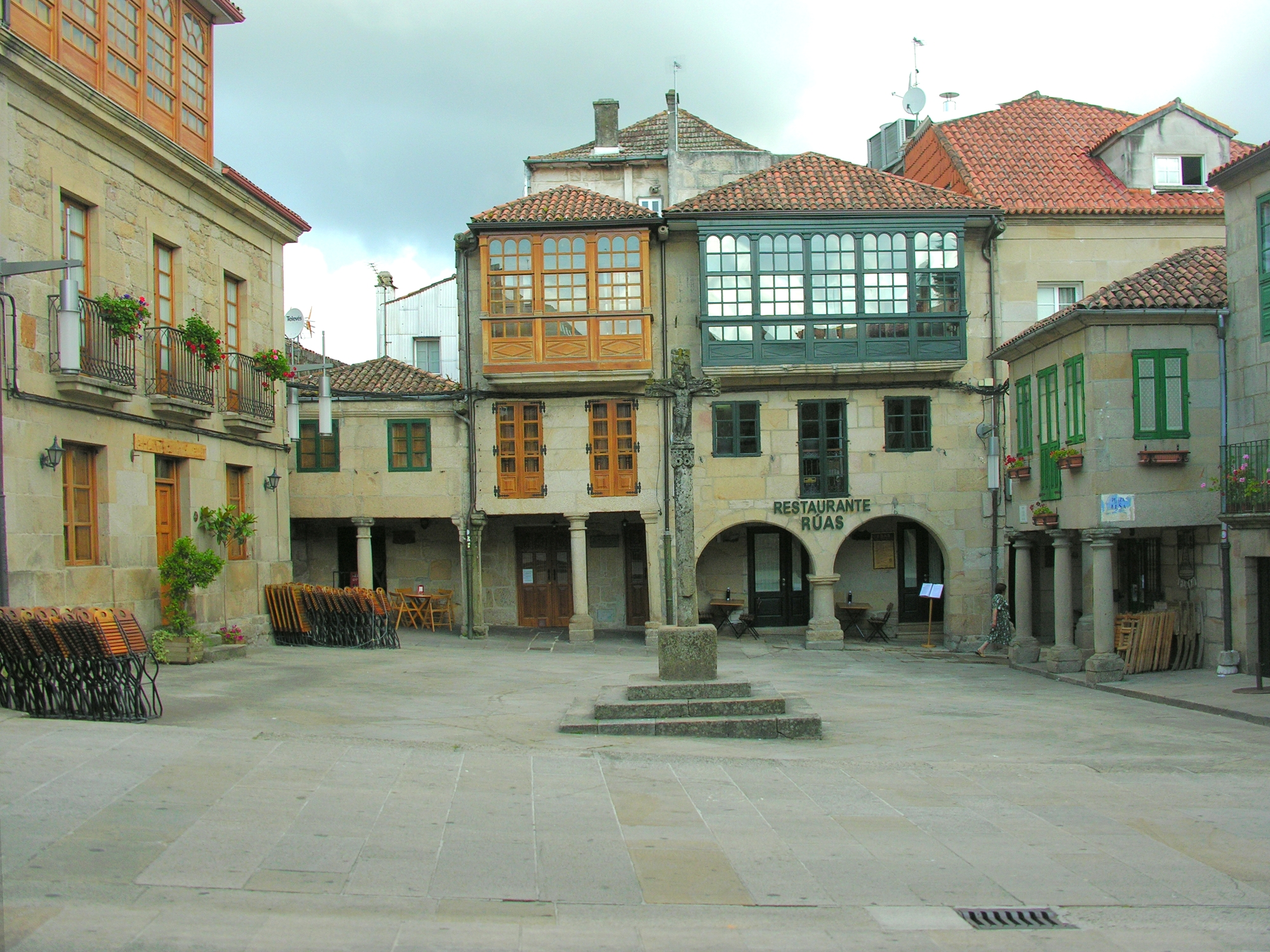
- Firewood square
- Native name: Praza da Leña (Galician)
- Type: plaza
- Maintained by: Pontevedra City Council
- Location: Pontevedra, Spain
- Postal code: 36002
- Coordinates: 42.432668°N 8.643287°W

The Plaza de la Leña (Galician: Praza da Leña; Firewood Square) is a picturesque medieval square located in the heart of the old town of Pontevedra (Spain). It is the most typical medieval square in the historic centre and in Galicia.

== Origin of the name ==
The square takes its name from the commercial activity that took place there in the past: wood and pine cones were sold to supply kitchen ovens, Fireplaces and the old heating systems of the town's houses.

== History ==
The Plaza de la Leña was known since the late Middle Ages as Eirado or Eiradiño in the 15th century. This square housed a market where the inhabitants of the neighbouring villages went to sell the firewood that was to be used as fuel for the kitchens and houses of the town within the walls. Muleteers from the surrounding area would gather here with carts full of firewood and peasant women with their bundles of twigs and baskets of pine cones.

This market took place every day, Monday being the most important day as it was the day when carts loaded with oak wood arrived in the town, which the bakers appreciated very much to feed their ovens.

The square was redesigned and enlarged in the 18th century, when the two large Pazos on the eastern side, the Pazo of Castro Monteagudo and the Pazo of García Flórez, were built. In 1854, it acquired the name of Firewood (La Leña).

The 15th century granite Calvary in the centre of the square was placed there around 1941 at the request of Castelao. The calvary, which was broken into several pieces, was temporarily restored by Castelao for his work As cruces de pedra na Galiza.

The square was returned to its former pedestrian use on 7 April 1990.

In 1998, several scenes from José Luis Cuerda's film Butterfly's Tongue were filmed in the square.

== Description ==
It is one of the smallest squares in the historic centre and the most picturesque medieval square in Galicia. It represents the typical medieval square of Galicia. Outstanding artists have made countless drawings, engravings, watercolours and oil paintings of it and it has been a source of inspiration for writers and poets such as Viñas Calvo.

The square has an irregular rectangular shape. In the centre of the square is a 15th-century granite calvary which came from Caldas de Reis.

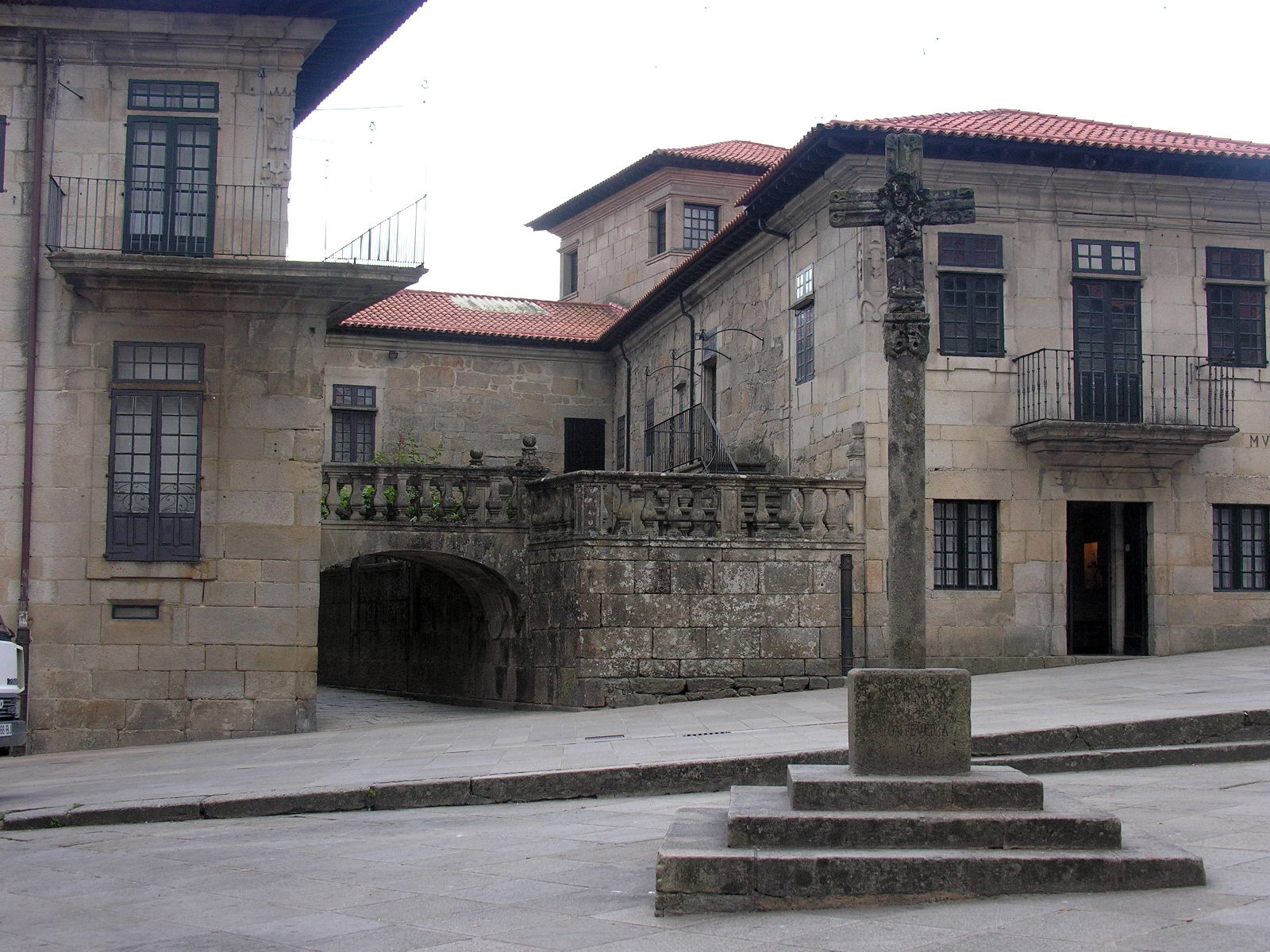
Calvary and baroque Pazos

Pasantería and Figueroa streets converge in the square. On the east side of the square are the 18th-century Baroque Pazos García Flórez and Castro Monteagudo (now part of the Pontevedra Museum) linked by a kind of granite arch bridge. On the north, south and west sides there are popular Galician houses with wooden arcades and galleries on the west and south sides and balconies decorated with flowers on the north and south sides. The upper floors were once used for dwellings. The height of the houses varies between one and two floors.

== Remarkable buildings ==
On the southeast side, the baroque pazo Castro Monteagudo, dating from 1760, stands out for its balcony supported by large Modillions, and the pazo García Flórez on the northeast side stands out for its huge stone coat of arms with a great helm and for the stone statues on the corners of the roof representing hope and strength.

The ground floor of the Pazo de Castro Monteagudo has had different uses over the centuries, for example as a restaurant or shop (as was the case with the La Imperial shop). The restaurant La Flor was located in this pazo during the first years of the 20th century. The boys' school was located on the first floor. The building was opened to the public as part of the Pontevedra Museum on 10 August 1929.

The Pazo de García Flórez was the headquarters of the Teacher Training College from 1881 to 1930. It was inaugurated as a museum on 15 August 1943.

The popular architectural houses in the square were built in the 18th century when the square was redeveloped.

== Popular culture ==
Currently, the square is dedicated to hotels and restaurants and is partly occupied by the tables of the surrounding restaurants.

In 2006, the Basque chef Iñaki Bretal opened his restaurant O Eirado da Leña in one of the houses in the square and in 2009 the restaurant Loaira in another of the houses. The O Eirado restaurant was awarded a Michelin star in 2020.

== Gallery ==
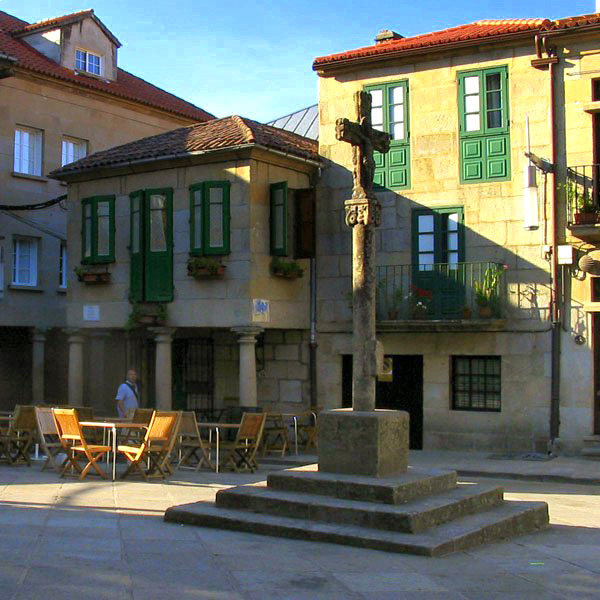
Typical Calvary in the centre of the square

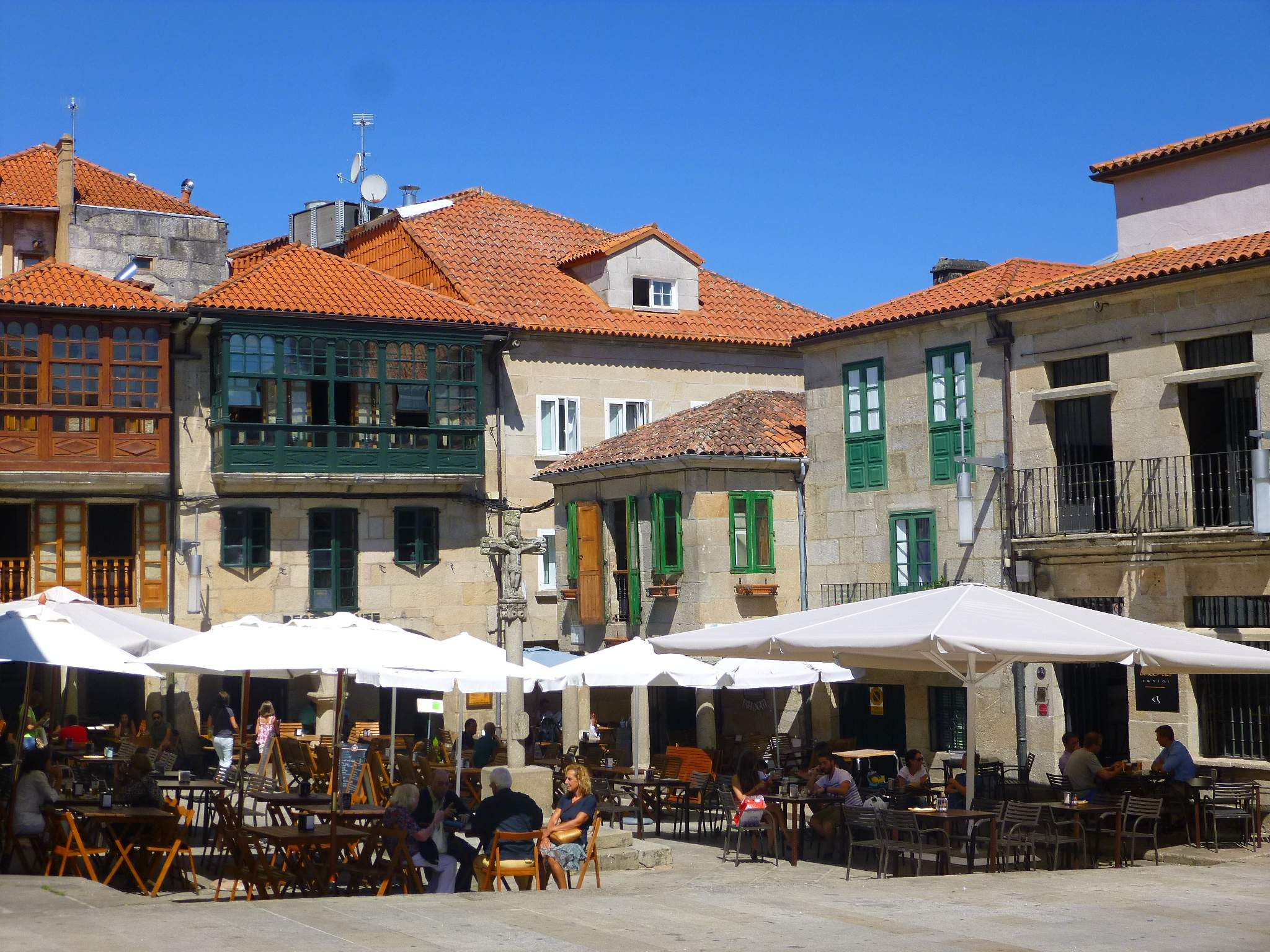
Restaurant tables in the square

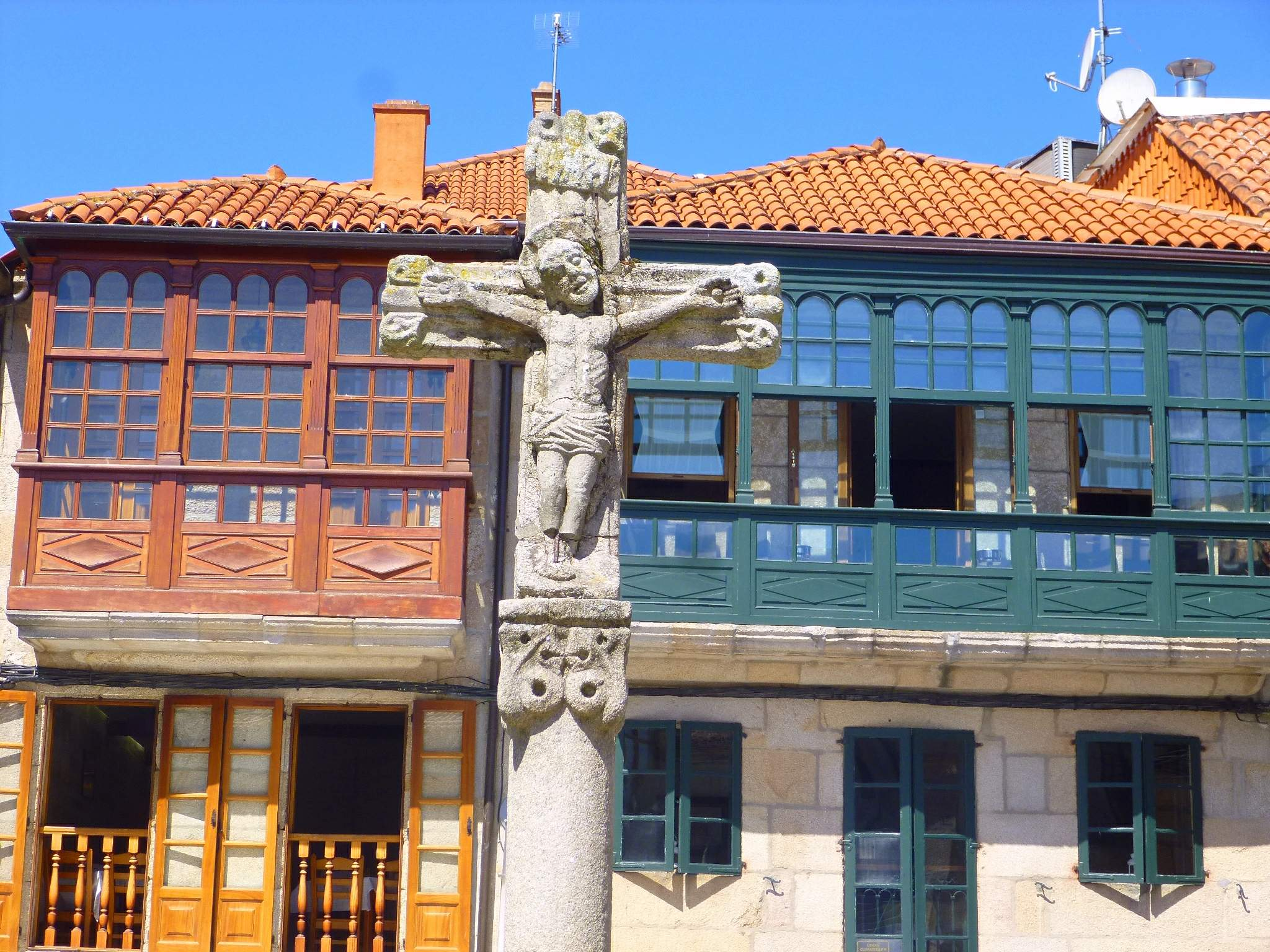
Stone cross and wooden galleries

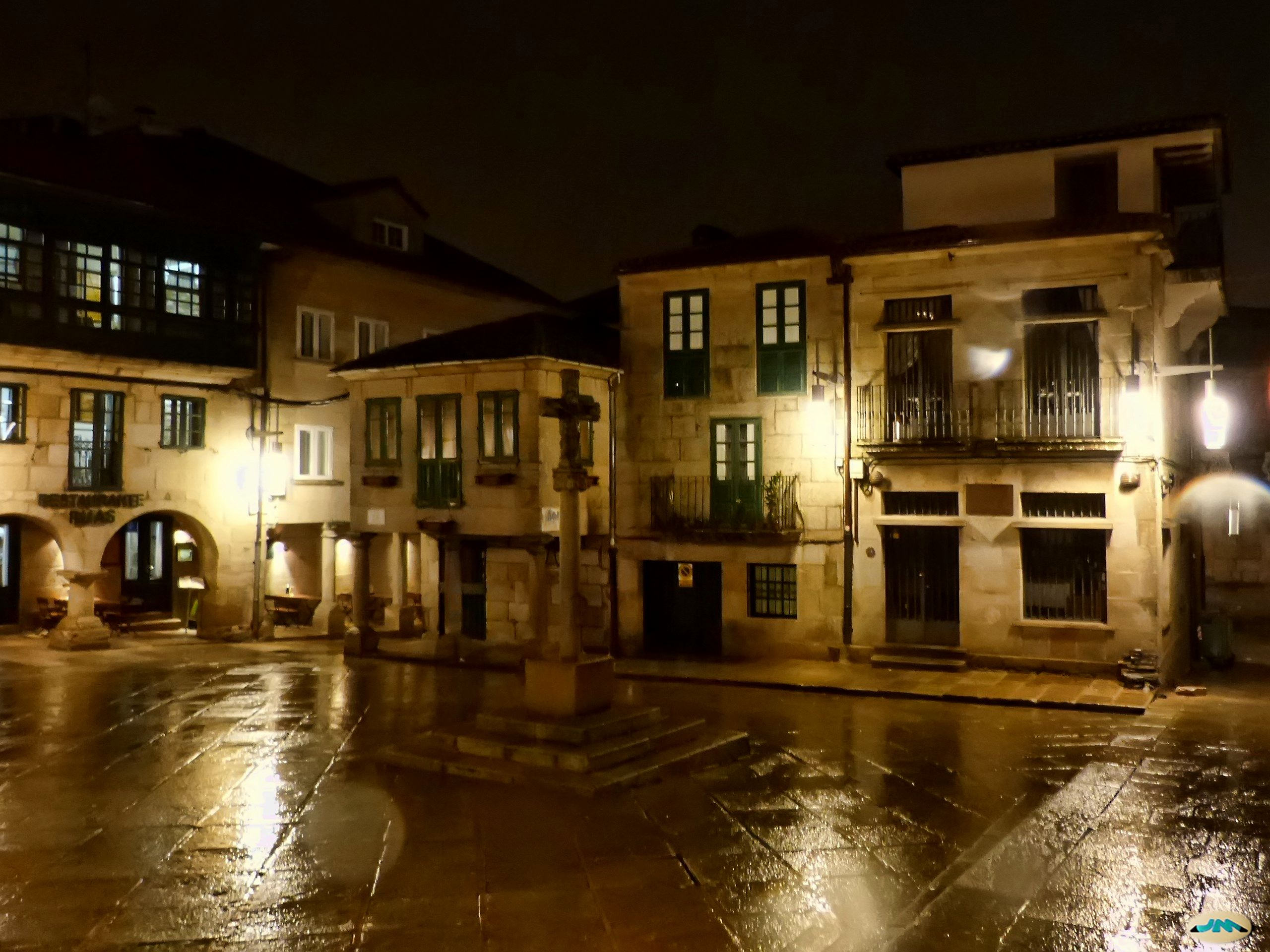
Plaza de la Leña at night

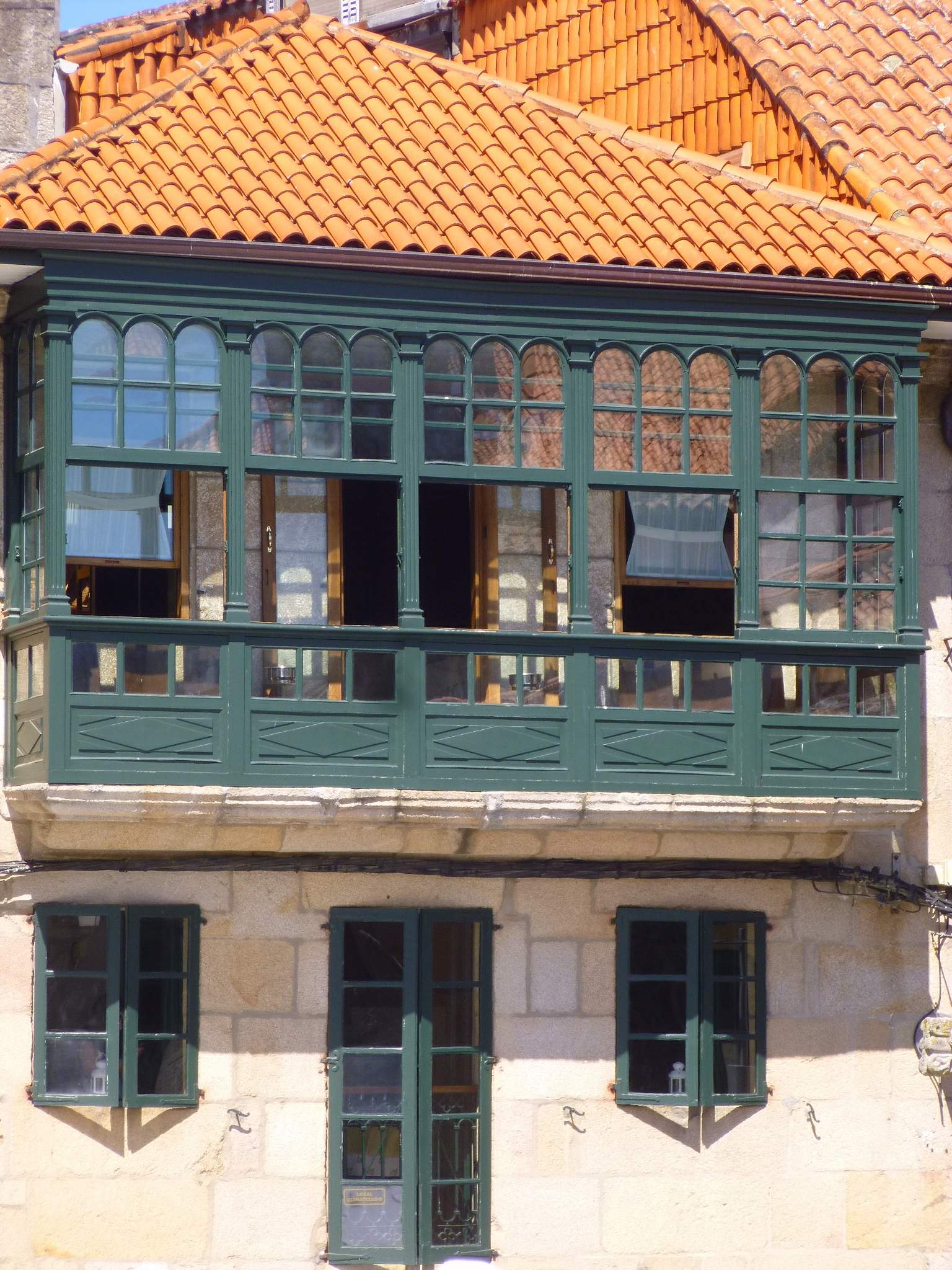
Wooden gallery

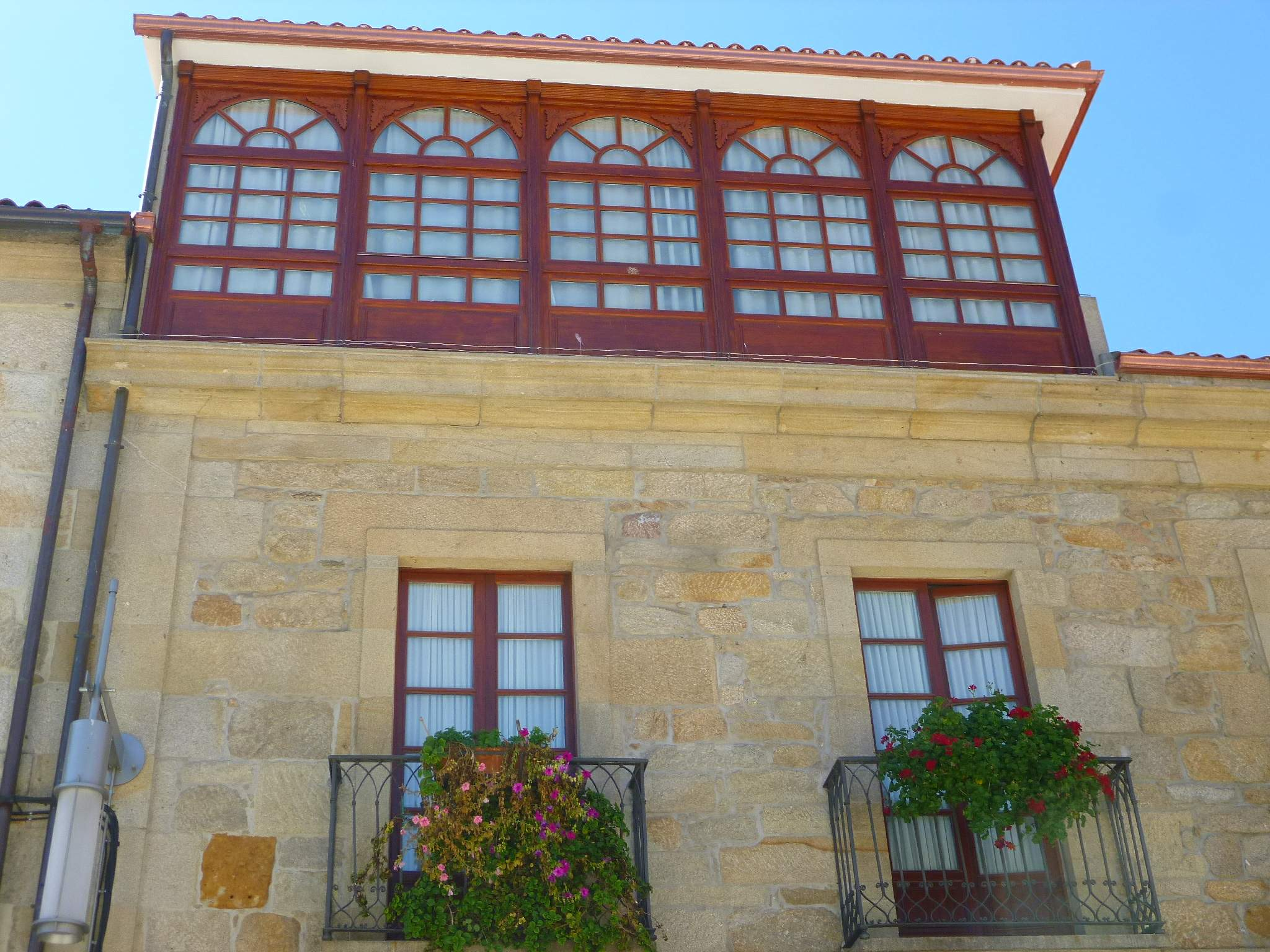
Balconies and galleries

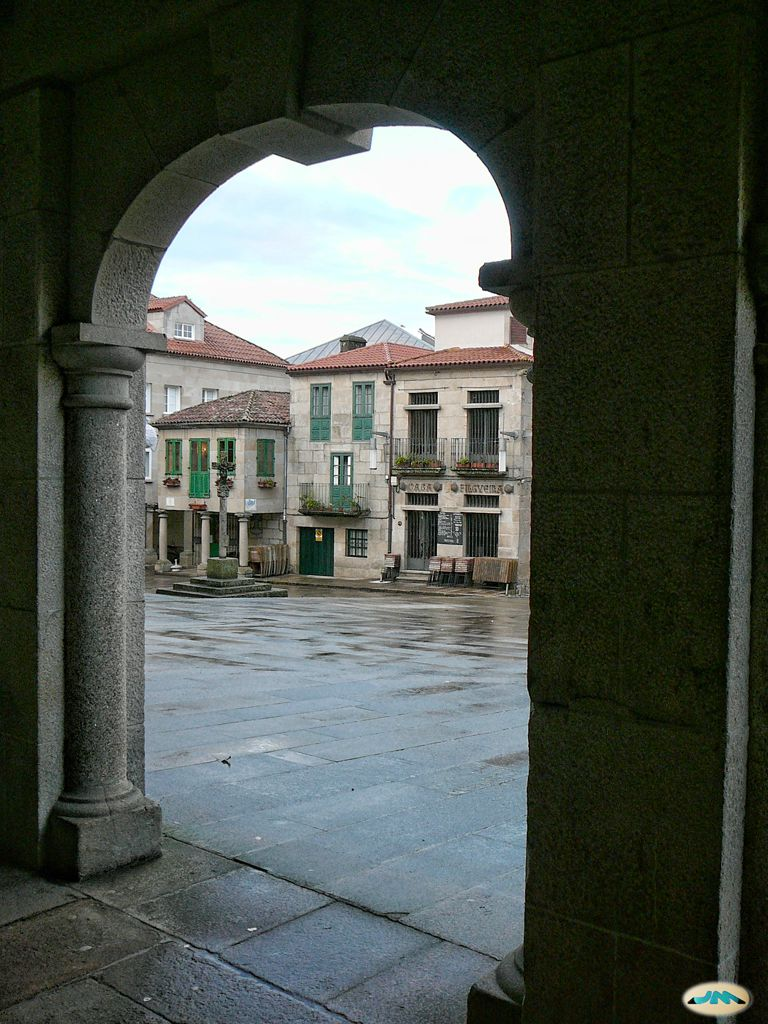
Arcades of the Fernández López building of the Pontevedra Museum

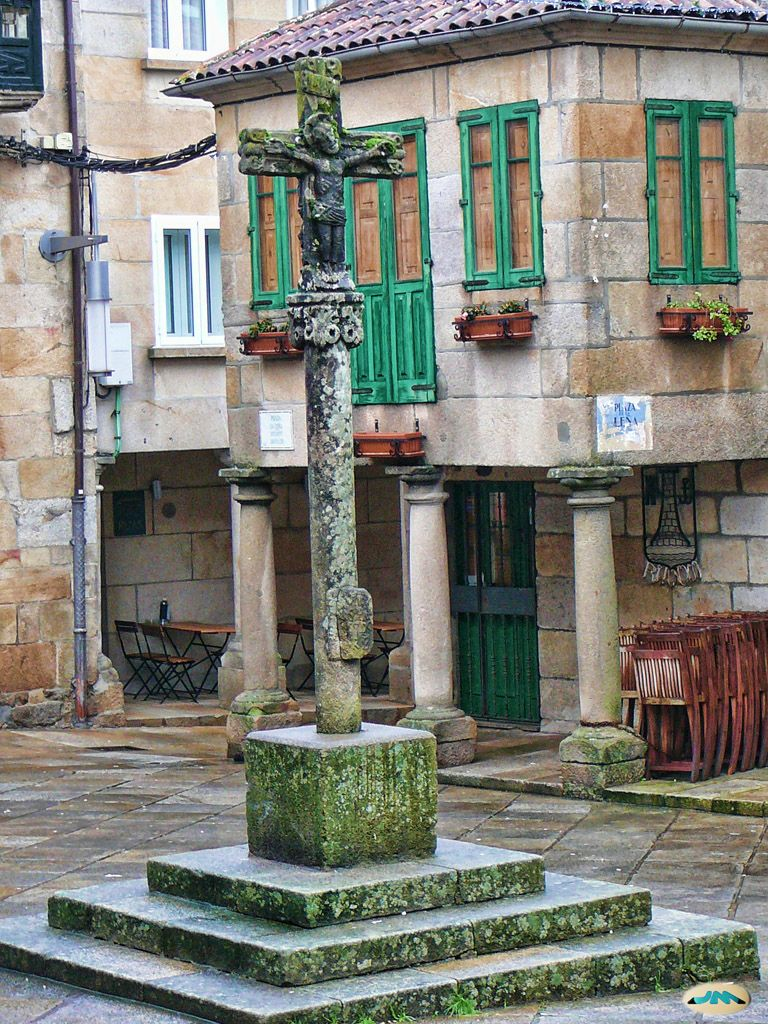
Calvairy

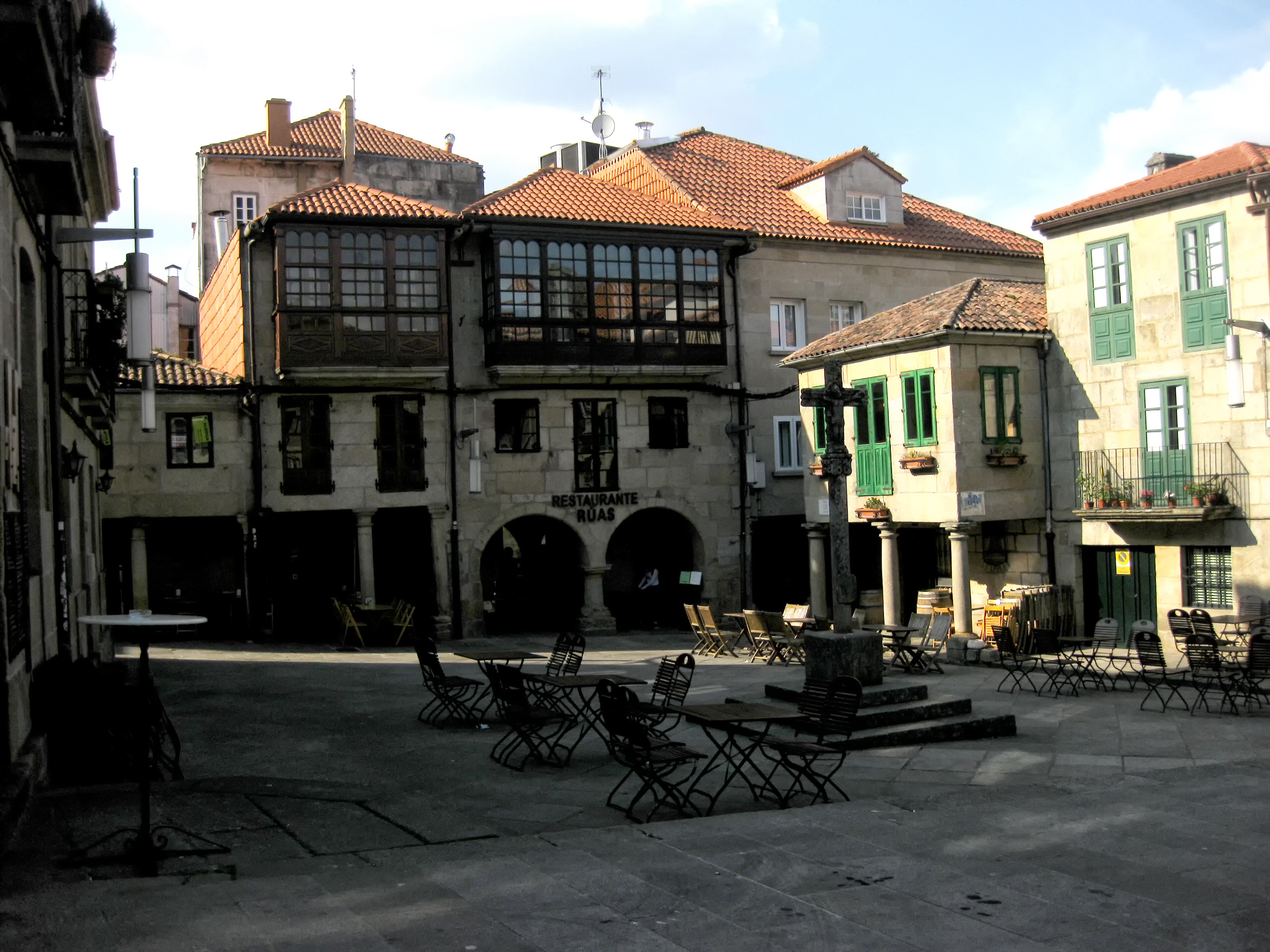
Plaza de la Leña

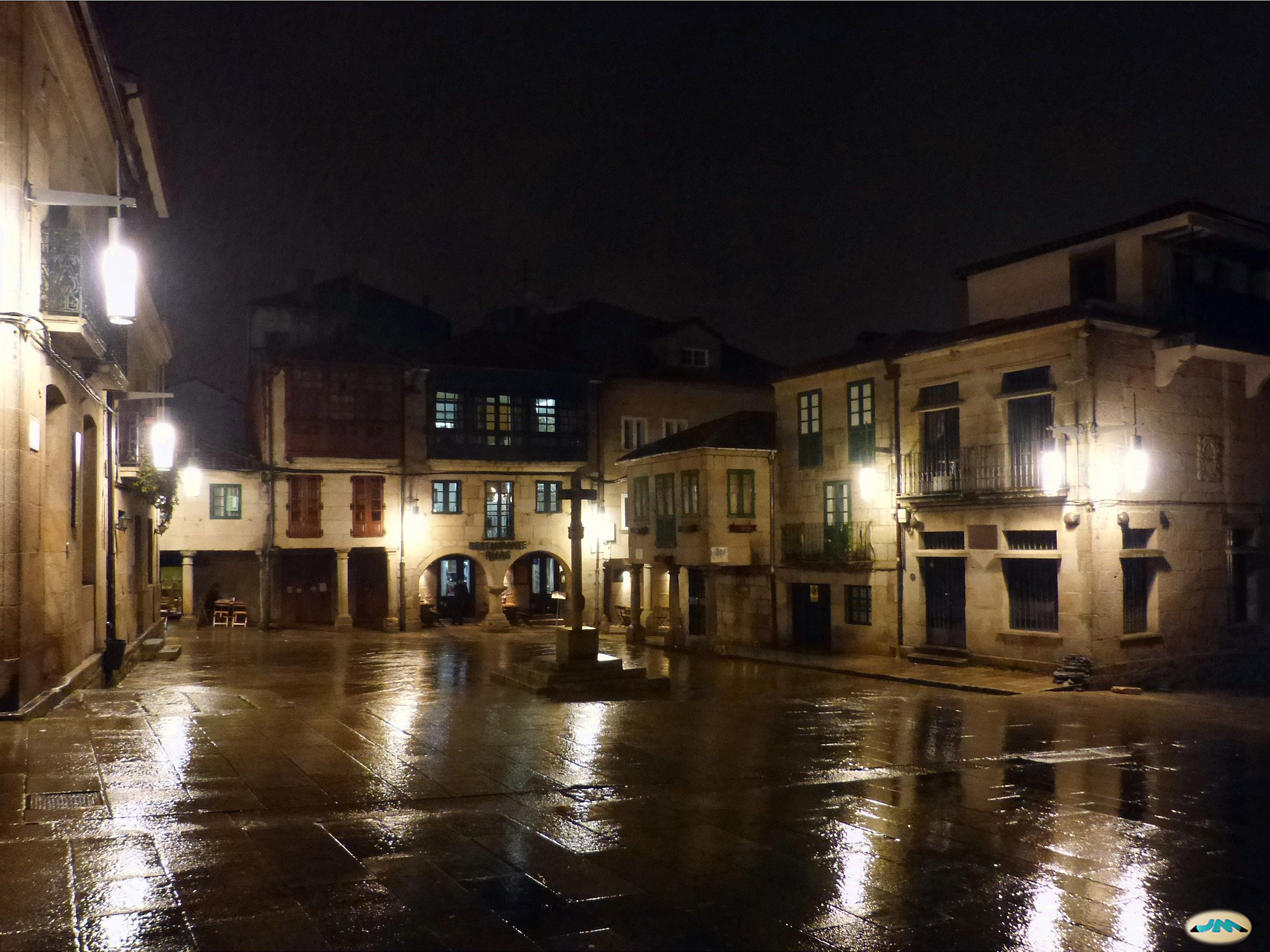
The square at night

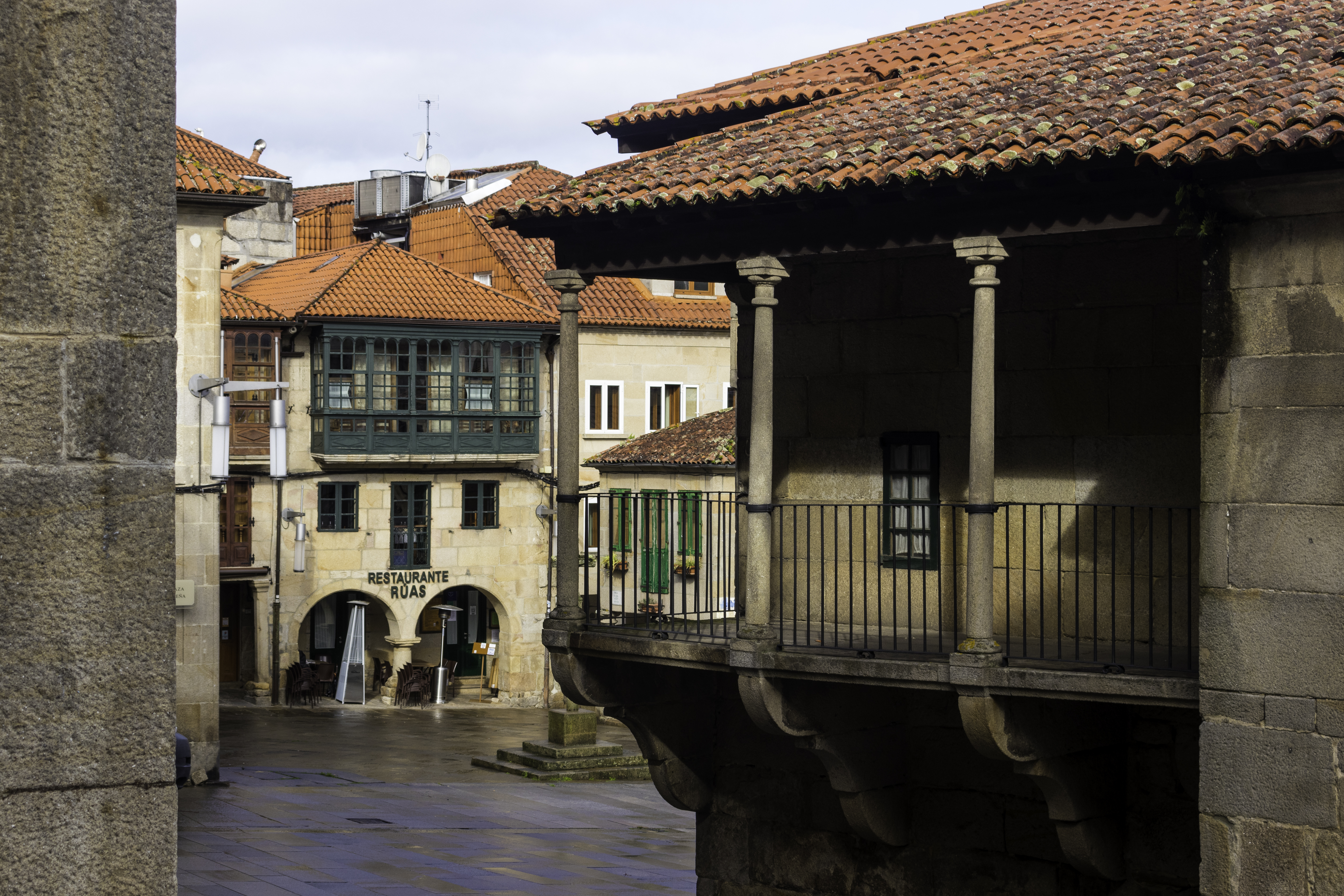
Pazo Castro Monteagudo

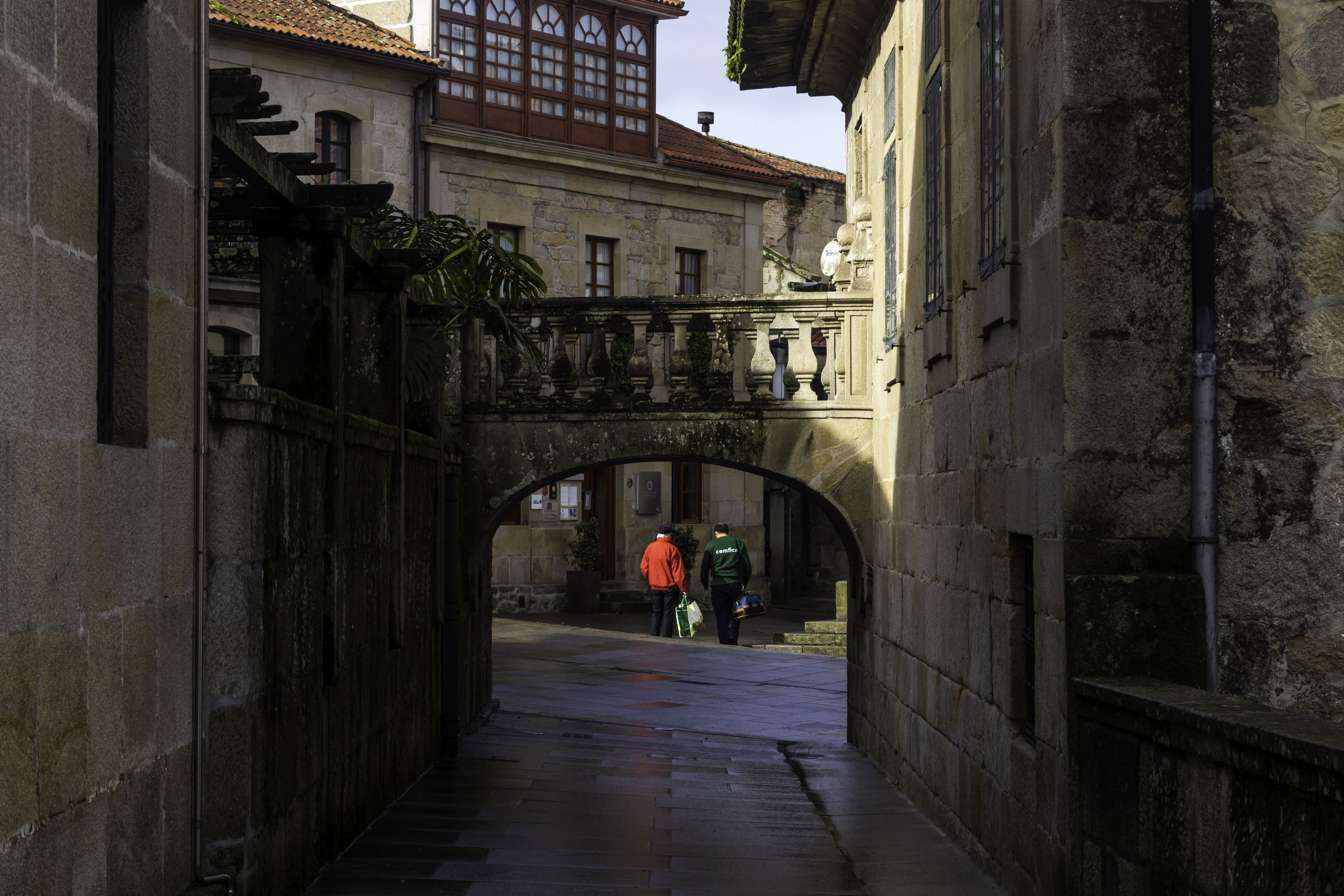
Arch bridge

== Bibliography ==
- Aganzo, Carlos (2010): Pontevedra. Ciudades con encanto. El País Aguilar. ISBN 8403509340.
- Fontoira Surís, Rafael (2009): Pontevedra monumental. Diputación de Pontevedra. ISBN 8484573273.
- García-Braña, C. et al. (1988): Pontevedra, planteamiento histórico y urbanístico, Deputación Provincial de Pontevedra, Servizo de Publicacións, Pontevedra.
- Juega Puig, J. et al. (1996): Historia de Pontevedra. Via Láctea, A Coruña.
- Juega Puig, J. (2000): As ruas de Pontevedra. Deputación Provincial de Pontevedra, Servizo de Publicacións, Pontevedra.
- Nadal, Paco (2012). Rias Baixas. Escapadas (in Spanish). Madrid: El País-Aguilar. p. 33. ISBN 978-8403501089.
- Nieto González, Remigio (1980) : Guía monumental ilustrada de Pontevedra. Asociación de Comerciantes de la Calle Manuel Quiroga, Pontevedra.

== See also ==
=== Related articles ===
- Pontevedra Museum

=== External links ===
- on the website Visit Pontevedra
- on the website Xunta de Galicia Tourism
- on the website Rias Baixas Tourism
- Pontevedra iconografía de una ciudad atlántica on the website of the University of Santiago de Compostela.
