= Pazo de García Flórez =

Mansion in Pontevedra, Spain

García Flórez Palace
- Pazo de García Flórez
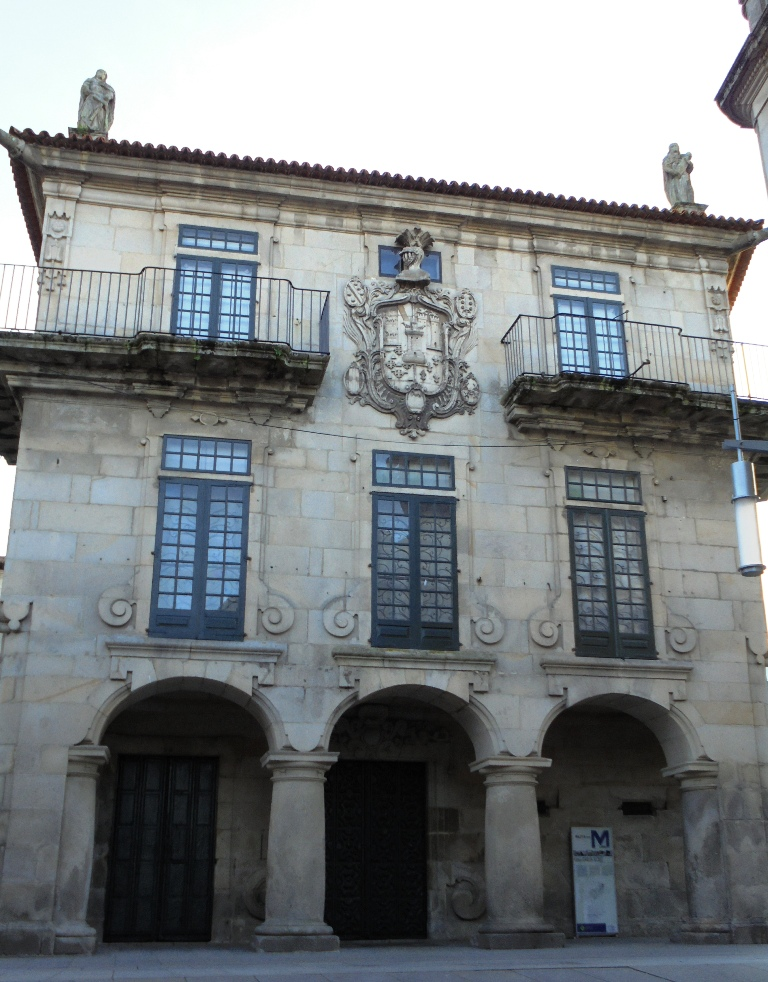
- Interactive map of the García Flórez Palace area

General information
- Type: Pazo
- Location: Pontevedra, Galicia, Spain
- Coordinates: 42°25′58.2″N 8°38′34.7″W
- Completed: 18th century
- Owner: Pontevedra Museum
- Operator: Pontevedra Museum

Technical details
- Floor count: 2

Website
- Official Site

The Pazo de García Flórez is an 18th-century baroque pazo located between Sarmiento Street and Plaza de la Leña in the city of Pontevedra, Spain, in the heart of the old town.

== History ==
At the end of the 18th century, Antonio García Estévez Fariña and his wife Tomasa Suárez Flórez commissioned the construction of this pazo, which was added to a smaller and older one.

A century later, between 1881 and 1930, the pazo became the headquarters of the Pontevedra Normal School.

In the 1930s, the pazo housed the Escuela Graduada for children on the first floor, while the second floor was used as the home of the school's director. These two floors were later rented to the Pontevedra City Council.

In the 1940s, the interior of the pazo was completely remodelled by the architect Robustiano Fernández Cochón to house the Pontevedra Museum. Its baroque exterior was preserved, an arch and a stone bridge were built to connect it to the pazo Castro Monteagudo and two stone statues of the Fortress and Hope were placed on the corners of the roof. On 15 August 1943, the Pazo García Flórez was inaugurated as the headquarters of the Pontevedra Museum.

The rooms of the museum were opened to the public on 4 September 1946, except for the reconstruction of the officers' cabin of the armoured frigate Numancia, which was inaugurated on 7 September 1946.

== Description ==
On the outside, the main façade on Sarmiento Street has a portico with three arches on large columns. There are three doors on the first floor, surrounded at the bottom by scrollwork, and on the second floor two doors with balconies that extend to the adjacent facades, among which is a large stone coat of arms crowned with a great helm, originally gilded and polychrome, surrounded by five Medallions. Inside the coat of arms, the lineages of the Estévez, Suárez, Fariña and Flórez families are represented. In the corners of the upper part of the façade there are two Gargoyles.

On the south façade there is a door on the ground floor and a large balcony along the façade on the first floor. On the east façade there is a succession of windows and doors on the upper floor and two doors on the first floor, one of which has a balcony. The Pasantería street façade has different windows distributed along the façade according to the stairs inside. The pazo has 778 square metres (8,374 sq ft) of constructed area.

Inside, there are rooms dedicated to decorative arts, sculpture and popular arts. Among the pieces on display are jet objects, Engravings, religious sculptures, Sargadelos earthenware, La Granja crystal, the office of Admiral Casto Méndez Núñez, a replica of the cabin of the armoured frigate Numancia and a traditional Galician kitchen.

After its renovation approved in 2022, the interior spaces will be diaphanous and free of obstacles, leaving only the original load-bearing walls that will give it a unified appearance. The pazo will also have a wide underground connection with the pazo de Castro Monteagudo.

== Gallery ==
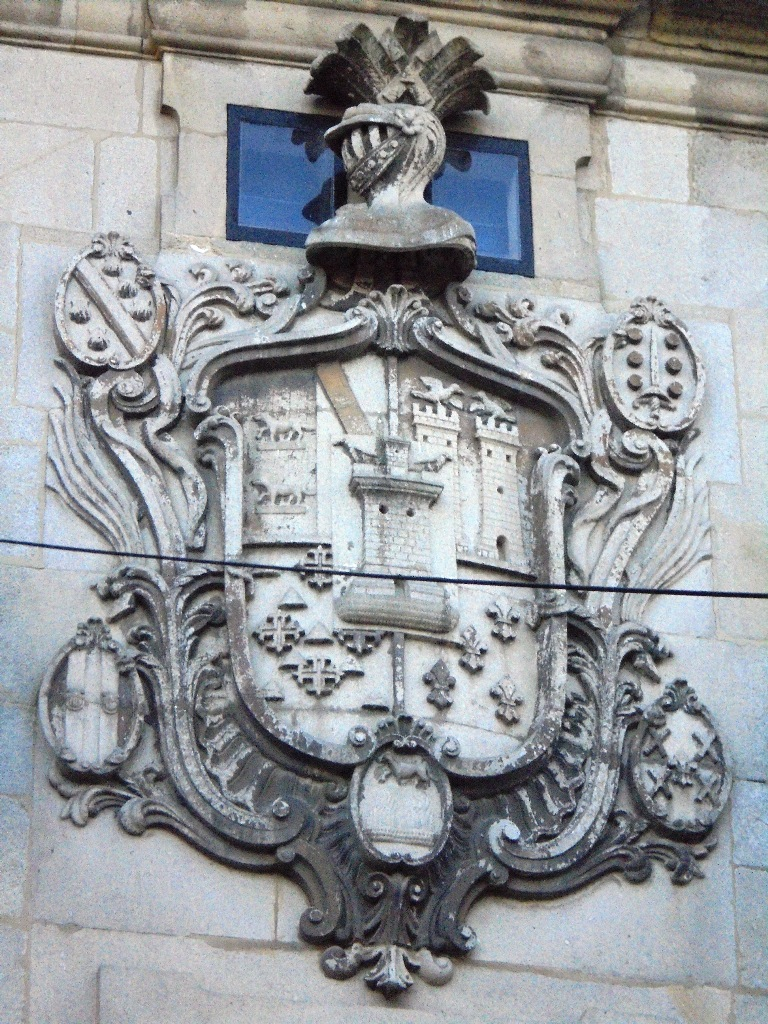
Coat of arms

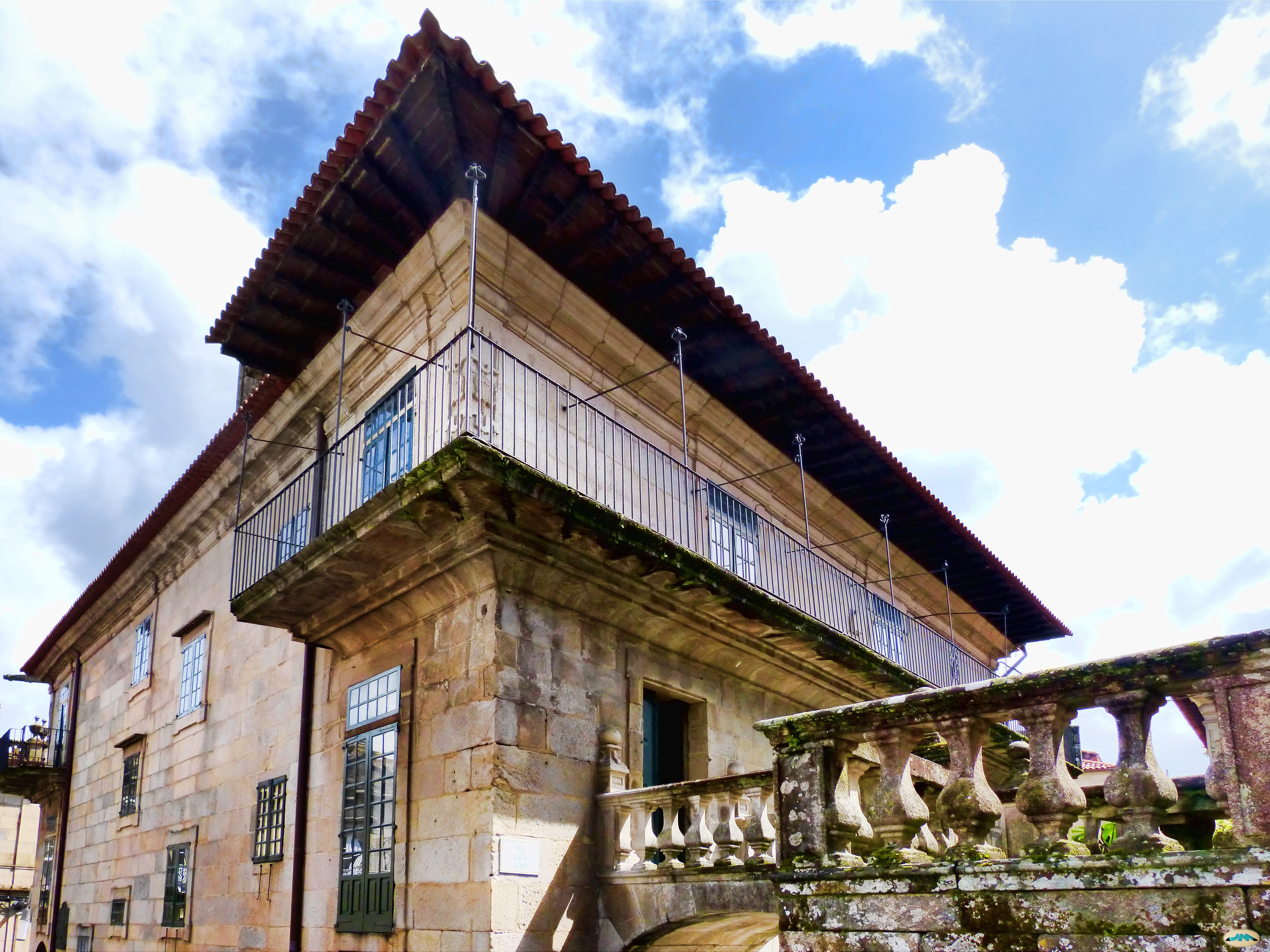
Southern façade

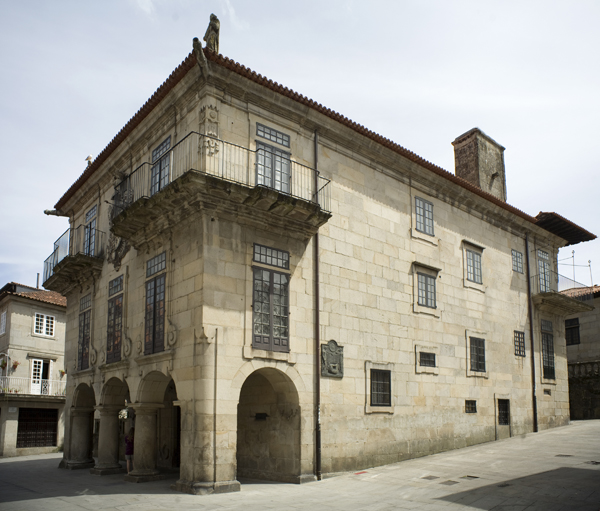
West façade, pasantería street

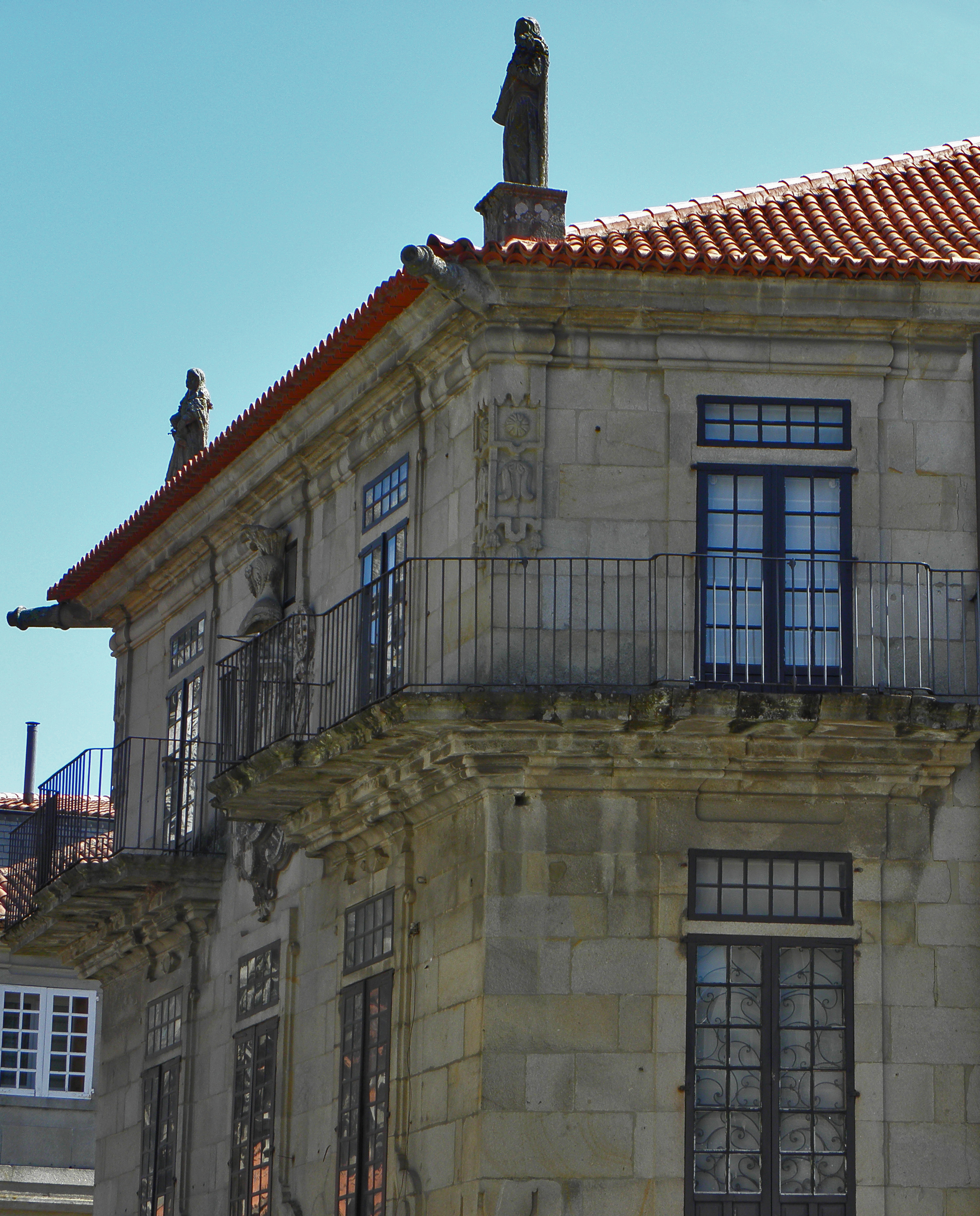
Statues of the Fortress and Hope on the roof

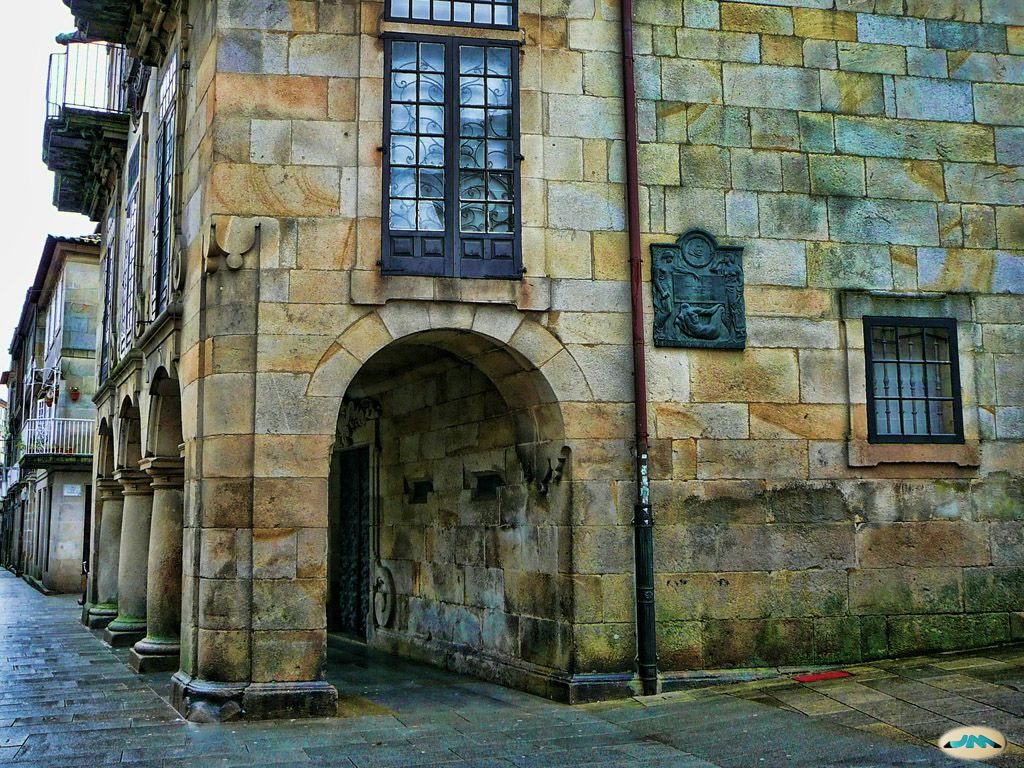
Arcades of the main façade

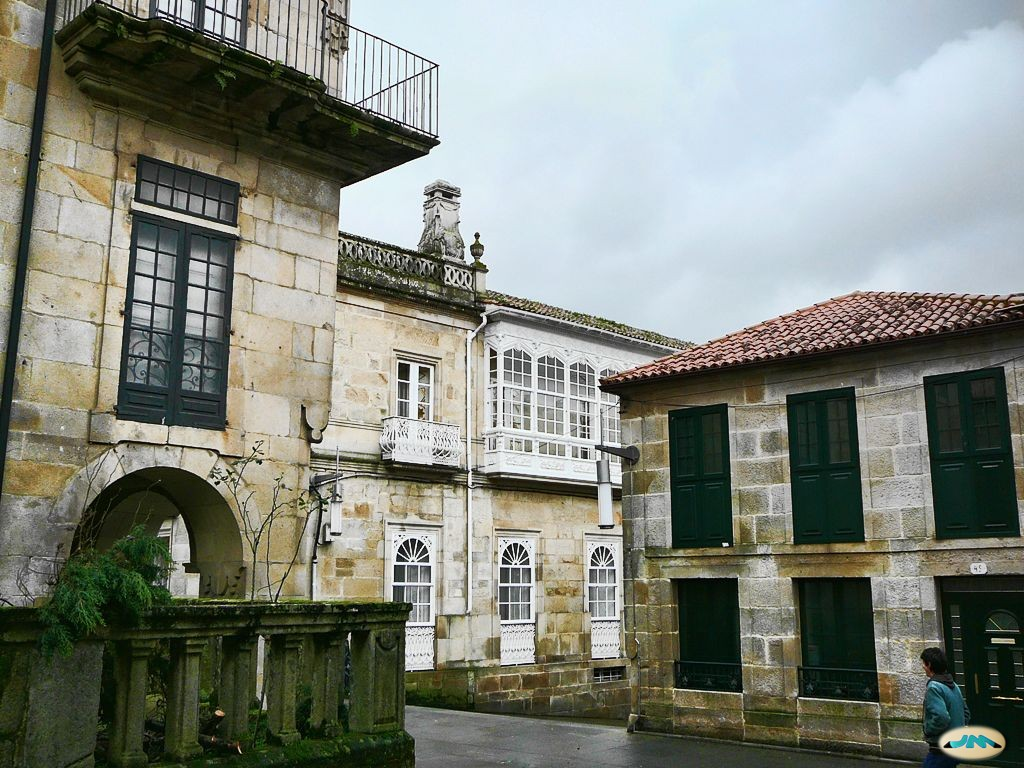
Eastern façade

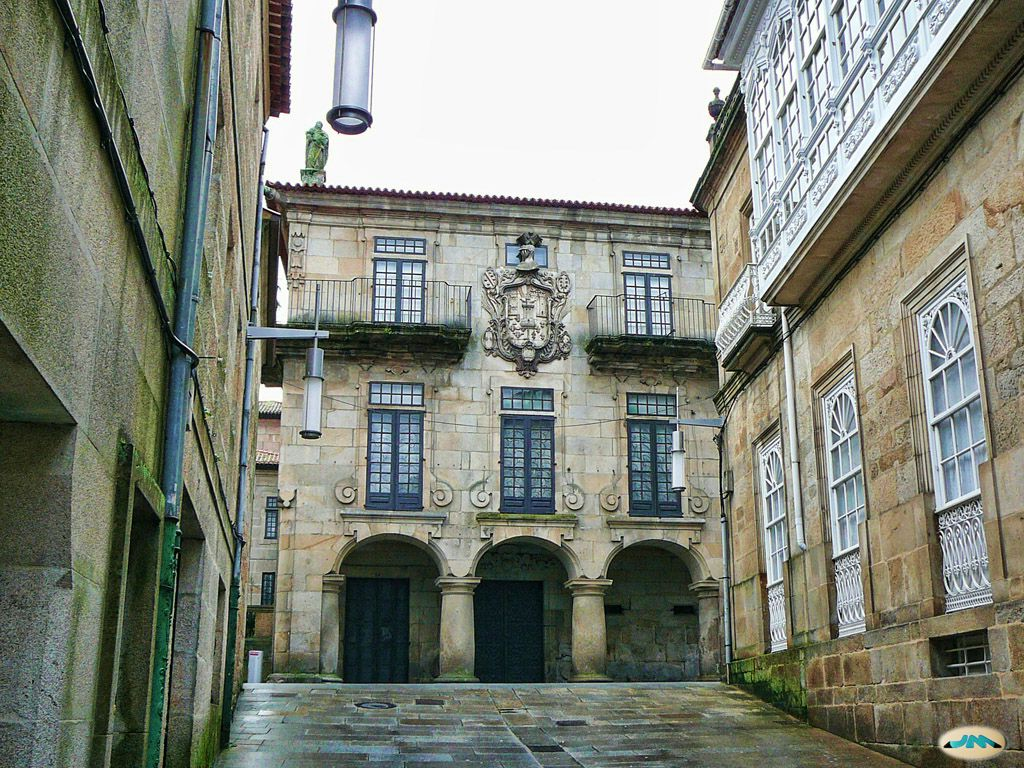
Main façade

== See also ==
=== Bibliography ===
- Aganzo, Carlos (2010). Pontevedra. Ciudades con encanto (in Spanish). Madrid: El País-Aguilar. p. 55-56. ISBN 978-8403509344.
- Fontoira Surís, Rafael (2009). Pontevedra monumental (in Spanish). Pontevedra: Diputación Provincial de Pontevedra. p. 308-309. ISBN 978-84-8457-327-2.
- Riveiro Tobío, Elvira (2008). Descubrir Pontevedra (in Spanish). Pontevedra: Edicións do Cumio. p. 61-62. ISBN 9788482890852.

=== Related articles ===
- Pontevedra Museum
- Sarmiento Street
- Plaza de la Leña
- Pazo de Castro Monteagudo
- Pazo de Mugartegui

=== External links ===
- García Flórez Building of the Pontevedra Museum
- on the website Magic Galicia
- on the website Rias Baixas Tourism
