= SS Alameda =

SS Alameda is the name of the following ships:

- SS Alameda (1883)
- SS Alameda (1919), became USS Alameda (AO-10) upon completion

== See also ==
- USS Alameda, ships of the U.S. Navy
- Alameda (disambiguation)
