= Alameda =

An alameda is a street or path lined with trees (from Spanish álamo 'poplar') and may refer to:

== Places ==
=== Canada ===
- Alameda, Saskatchewan, town in Saskatchewan
  - Grant Devine Dam, formerly Alameda Dam, a dam and reservoir in southern Saskatchewan

=== Chile ===
- Alameda (Santiago), Santiago, Chile's main avenue, whose official name is Avenida Libertador General Bernardo O'Higgins

=== Spain ===
- Alameda, Andalusia, a town and municipality in the province of Málaga
- Alameda de Pontevedra, a public park in Pontevedra
- La Alameda, Seville, a neighbourhood in Seville

=== United States ===
==== Inhabited places ====
- Alameda, California, a city in Alameda County, California
  - Alameda (island), an island making up most of the city's area
  - Naval Air Station Alameda, a former United States navy base
- Alameda County, California, county in the state of California in the United States
- Alameda Park, a public park in Santa Barbara, California
- Rancho Arroyo de la Alameda, name of a Spanish land grant in the San Francisco Bay Area
- Alameda (Miami), a neighborhood in the city of Miami, Florida
- Alameda, Idaho, a former city in Idaho
  - Almeda University, a non-accredited educational institution addressed in Alameda, Idaho
- Alameda, New Mexico, a village in New Mexico
- Alameda, Portland, Oregon, a neighborhood in Portland, Oregon

==== Streets ====
- The Alameda (San Jose), a major arterial road between downtown San Jose and Santa Clara, California
- Alameda de las Pulgas, sometimes called The Alameda, a street between San Carlos and Menlo Park, California
- Alameda Street, a major thoroughfare in Los Angeles County, California
  - Alameda Corridor, a freight railroad in a trench adjacent to Alameda Street
- The Alameda (Baltimore), a street in North Baltimore, Maryland
- Colorado State Highway 26 (Alameda Avenue), a city street and major thoroughfare in Denver, Colorado

=== Other places ===
- Alameda Central, a public park in Mexico City
- Gibraltar Botanic Gardens, a botanical garden in Gibraltar also called La Alameda Gardens
- Alameda, neighbourhood in Lisbon, Portugal

== Ships ==
- USS Alameda, the name of various United States Navy ships
- Alameda / Oakland Ferry, San Francisco Bay Ferry, California
- Alameda Harbor Bay Ferry, San Francisco Bay Ferry, California

== Transit ==
- Alameda railway station, main train station of Santiago, Chile
- Alameda (Lisbon Metro), Lisbon, Portugal
- Alameda metro station (Monterrey), Mexico
- Alameda station (RTD), a transit station in Denver, Colorado, United States
- Alameda Corridor, a freight rail line in Los Angeles, California, United States
- Alameda (Metrovalencia), Valencia, Spain
- La Alameda metro station (Quito), Ecuador

== Other uses ==
- Alameda Research, a quantitative trading firm, founded by Sam Bankman-Fried
- Irene Zoe Alameda (born 1974), Spanish writer and film director
- College of Alameda, a two-year community college located in Alameda, California, in the United States
- "Alameda", a song by Elliott Smith from the 1997 album Either/Or
- The Alameda Newspaper Group (ANG Newspapers), publisher of several newspapers in the San Francisco Bay area in California, United States

== See also ==
- Alameda Creek, San Francisco Bay area, California
- The Alameda (disambiguation)
- Alamo (disambiguation)
- Alameda Theater (disambiguation)
