= Saint Ferdinand Barracks =

Neoclassical building in Pontevedra, Spain

- Cuartel de San Fernando
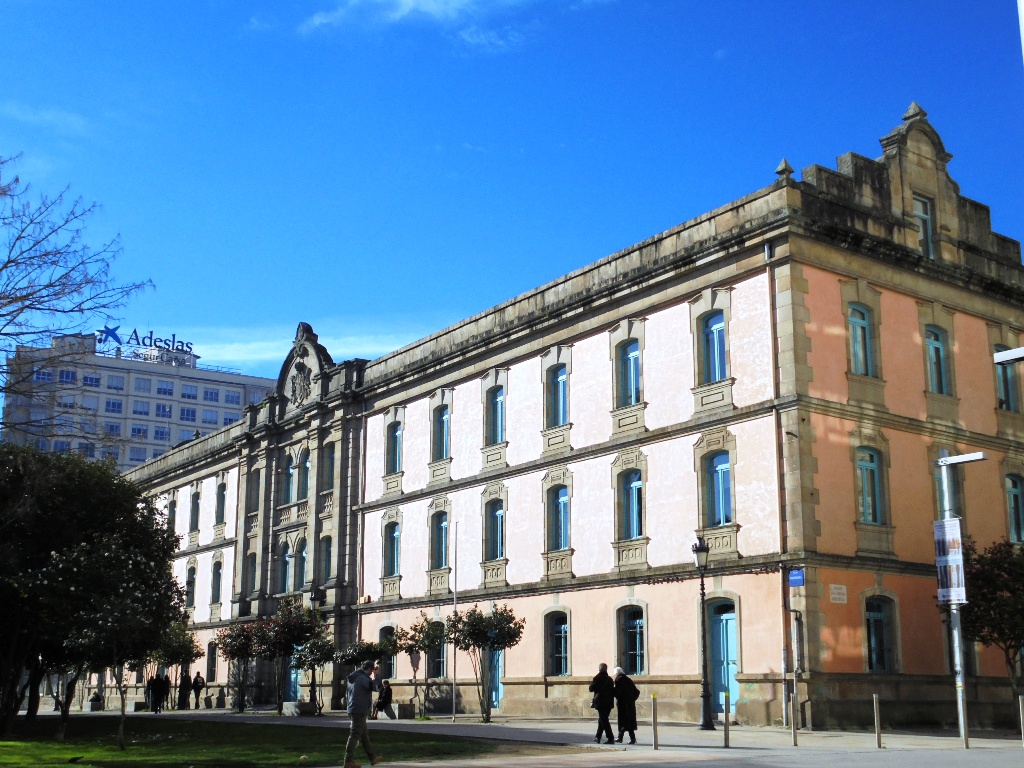
- Former Saint Ferdinand Barracks façade
- Interactive map of the Saint Ferdinand Barracks area
- Former names: Real Maestranza

General information
- Type: Barracks
- Architectural style: Neoclassical
- Location: Pontevedra, Galicia, Spain
- Coordinates: 42°25′54″N 8°38′56″W
- Construction started: 1906
- Completed: 1909
- Cost: over 600,000 pesetas
- Owner: Pontevedra City Council

Technical details
- Floor count: 4

Design and construction
- Structural engineer: Bonifacio Menéndez Conde y Riego
- Main contractor: Manuel Vázquez Gil

The former Saint Ferdinand Barracks in Pontevedra, is a large neoclassical building from the beginning of the 20th century located in the centre of Pontevedra (Spain), opposite the Doctor Marescot Gardens and very close to the Alameda de Pontevedra.

== History ==
=== The Royal House of the Maestranza ===
The Royal House of the Maestranza (predecessor of the current Saint Ferdinand barracks) was built by Íñigo Melchor Fernández de Velasco, Constable of Castile and León and Captain General of Galicia between 1665 and 1668. It was built with stone from the demolition of houses in the A Moureira neighbourhood, which had been left abandoned at the end of the previous century. It was a one-storey building with four wings and a large central courtyard, whose initial function was to house soldiers in transit during the war with Portugal (1640–1668).

During the War of the Quadruple Alliance, British forces led by General Philip Honywood invaded and captured Pontevedra on 10 October 1719, capturing 200 Spanish soldiers and causing the city's population to flee. The British proceeded to burn several strategically important buildings unopposed, including the barracks. After the British withdrew, a number of restoration works were carried out by the Spanish authorities, such as repairing the roofs. The building was so badly damaged that Spanish troops stationed in Pontevedra had to be accommodated in other barracks in the city.

The municipality of Pontevedra asked the Bourbon monarchy to rebuild the Real Maestranza. The procedures for the reconstruction of the barracks began with the order of the Intendant Francisco Salvador de Pineda, to accommodate a cavalry squadron of the Montesa Regiment in the city. The Minister of War, the Duke of Montemar, ordered the military engineer Antonio Flobert to draw up the plans for the new building (preserved in the General Archive of Simancas in the province of Valladolid).

=== The second barracks ===
The Real Maestranza began to be rebuilt in the year 1738. The construction designed by Antonio Flobert took advantage of the walls of the previous barracks and the heraldry. The barracks was named Saint Dominic and was later renovated and enlarged. In 1790, the barracks served as a hospital for invalids in the army. From the end of the 18th century, the Princess Infantry Regiment was based in this barracks. In 1807 it was led by the Count of San Román. It was used as a gun factory during the Spanish War of Independence.

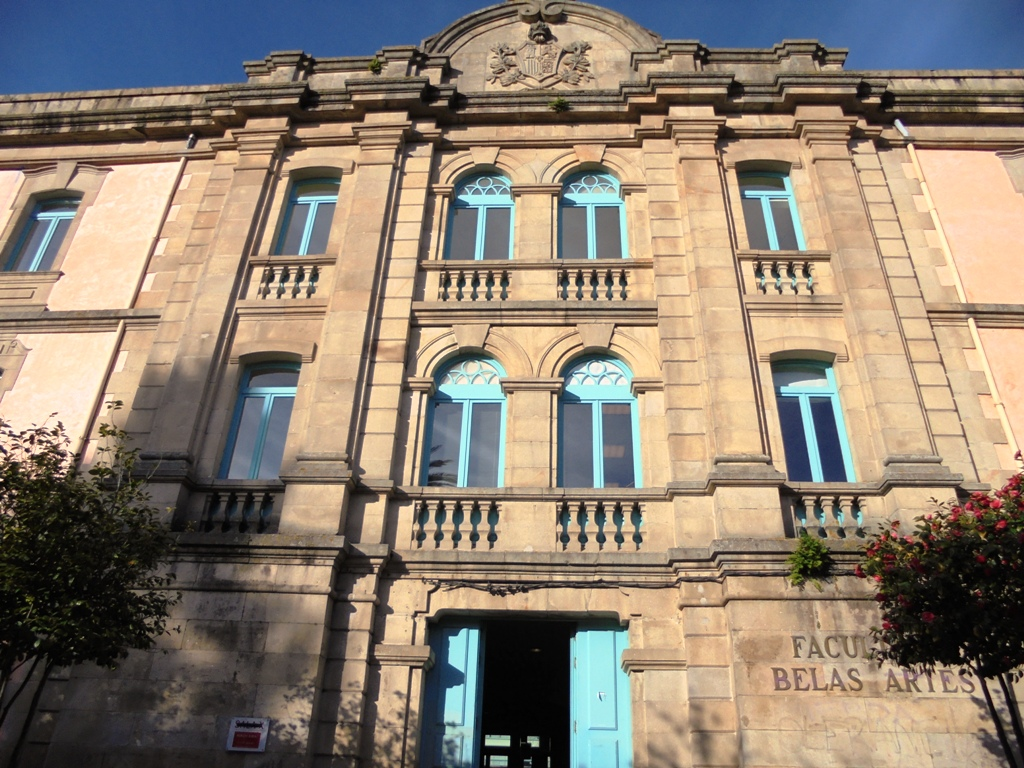
Entrance to the former barracks

The barracks were also known as the Cavalry Barracks and the City of Pontevedra Barracks until the 19th century, when it received its current name of Saint Ferdinand Barracks. In 1831, the Pontevedra City Council ceded ownership of the barracks to the Military Treasury, which rebuilt its façade and converted it into Infantry barracks.

=== The current Saint Ferdinand Barracks ===
In the last third of the 19th century, the barracks were in a rather dilapidated state and it was decided to demolish them in order to construct a new building to house a larger garrison. In 1889, the town council requested a state subsidy of 200,000 pesetas for the construction of a third barracks, but it was not until the end of the 19th century that the government agreed to the project through the Marquis of Riestra (who advanced 15,000 pesetas). The building was designed by the military engineer Bonifacio Menéndez Conde, who kept a similar structure to the previous barracks, although the height was increased and the perimeter was enlarged.

In September 1903, the construction of the new barracks was announced and the work was auctioned off for 800,000 pesetas thanks to the efforts of the Minister of Finance Augusto González Besada. The old barracks were vacated in April 1904. On 1 July 1905, the Ministry of War published in the Madrid Gazette the call for a public auction for the demolition, levelling of the land and construction of the new Saint Ferdinand barracks in Pontevedra, which was scheduled for 10 August. At the beginning of September 1905, the work was entrusted to the city's contractor, Manuel Vázquez Gil. On 14 December of the same year, the military engineers in charge of the work came to the city to draw up the layout of the barracks.

In February 1906, masonry work began on the new barracks. In October 1908, the engineer Bonifacio Menéndez-Conde Riego was commissioned to inspect the construction work, and in November it was supervised on site by Menéndez Conde and his superior Félix Casuso Solano.

The work on the St Ferdinand barracks took 3 years and was completed in March 1909. The barracks cost more than 600,000 pesetas and were handed over to the military authorities in a ceremony on 14 August 1909. On 21 August, the transfer of the offices to the new barracks began. In September the water supply project was approved, the installation of which was inspected by Daniel de la Sota, and in October 1909 the budget was allocated for this purpose.

In front of the façade of the new barracks, the Count de la Peña del Moro Field was redesigned, adding trees and gardens and a street at the entrance to the barracks. The transverse street of the Maestranza was also redesigned in 1911, under the name of General Martitegui Street, after the demolition of some houses. In the 20th century, among its military functions, the barracks housed Company No. 83 of the Military police and the Parks and Garages Unit.

The definitive abandonment of the barracks by the members of the armed forces took place on 15 December 1992 in a military protocol ceremony held in the inner courtyard of the building, in the presence of all the local authorities. The property was handed over to the municipality of Pontevedra, which transferred it to the Galician Faculty of Fine Arts. The renovation project was entrusted to the architect César Portela. The remodelling was complex as it transformed a closed barracks into an open and luminous space for artistic education. During the refurbishment process, Maestranza Street was incorporated as a pedestrian access platform to the building.

Between December 1994 and January 1995, the renovation of the building intended to house the Faculty of Fine Arts was completed. In 1994, the Faculty of Fine Arts of Pontevedra, created in 1990, began to set up there.

== Description ==
It is a large rectangular building in the neoclassical style. It has a ground floor and two upper floors, with rectangular windows, balcony parapets and lintels forming auricles, typical of the 19th century in Pontevedra.

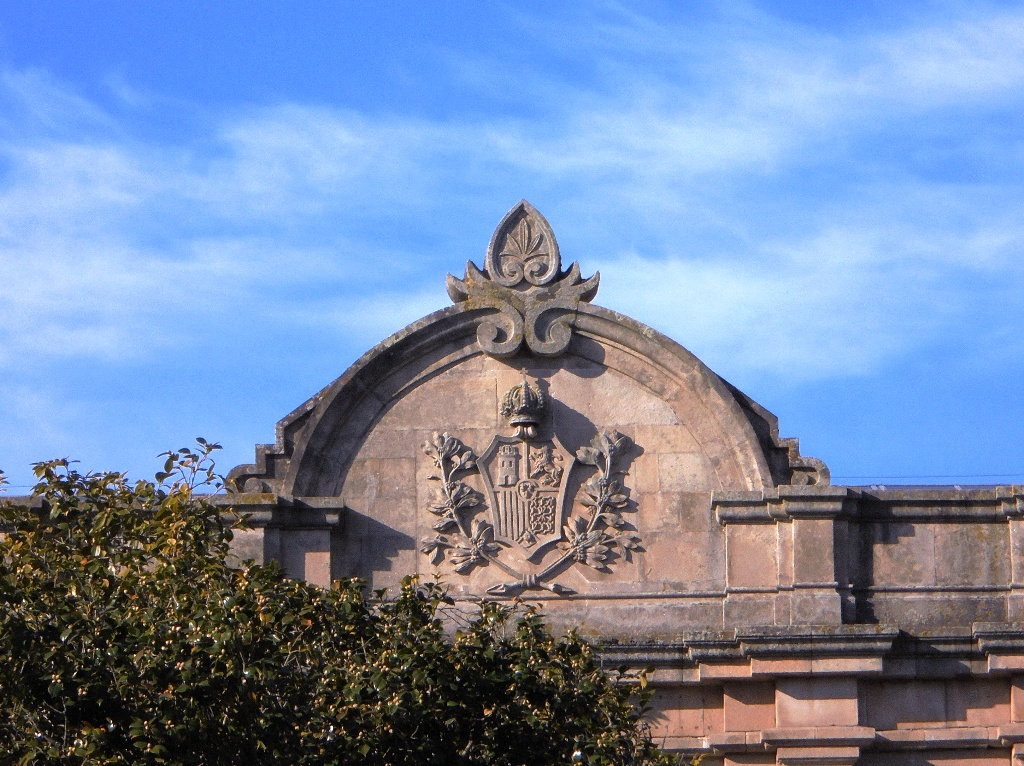
Spanish coat of arms on top of the former barracks

The central part of the façade, which determines the institutional character of the building, where the entrance door is located, the base, the balcony parapets, the window and door lintels, the pilasters and cornices are made of granite and the rest of the wall of masonry. The façade is crowned at the top by a circular pediment topped by a vegetal form (originally used to support the flag), on which is the coat of arms of Spain, also in granite. The total symmetry and continuity of the multiple windows along the facades are remarkable, creating a bright interior. On the eastern façade and in the large central courtyard, the stone window frames are simple and undecorated.

During the exterior renovation of the facade in 1994, the plaster of the walls where the masonry was visible was recovered and the colour guava was applied to it. In the course of this renovation, the architect César Portela also chose to use green for the windows and doors.

Inside the building, the large central courtyard, originally 84 metres long and 40 metres wide, is remarkable. After the 1995 remodelling, the courtyard has been transformed into a cloister and garden with poplars, tamarinds and low vegetation, preserving its character as a central space. It was given a perimeter body for circulation in the form of a glass gallery, and a cubic room, also made of glass, was introduced into the interior, containing the large, flexible studios for sculpture, drawing and painting. A new floor was also created under the roof of the existing building to house the library, a documentation and information centre and other workshops, all with overhead lighting.

== Gallery ==
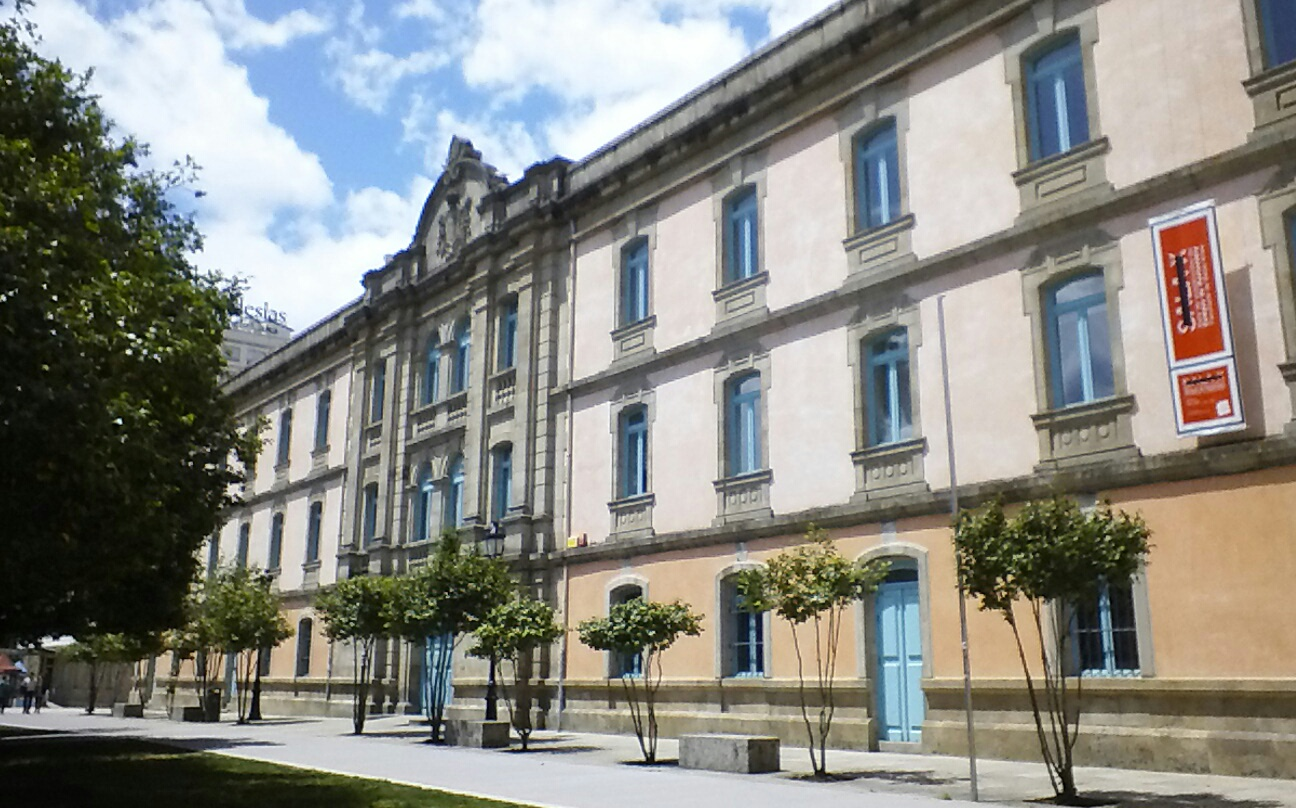
Main facade

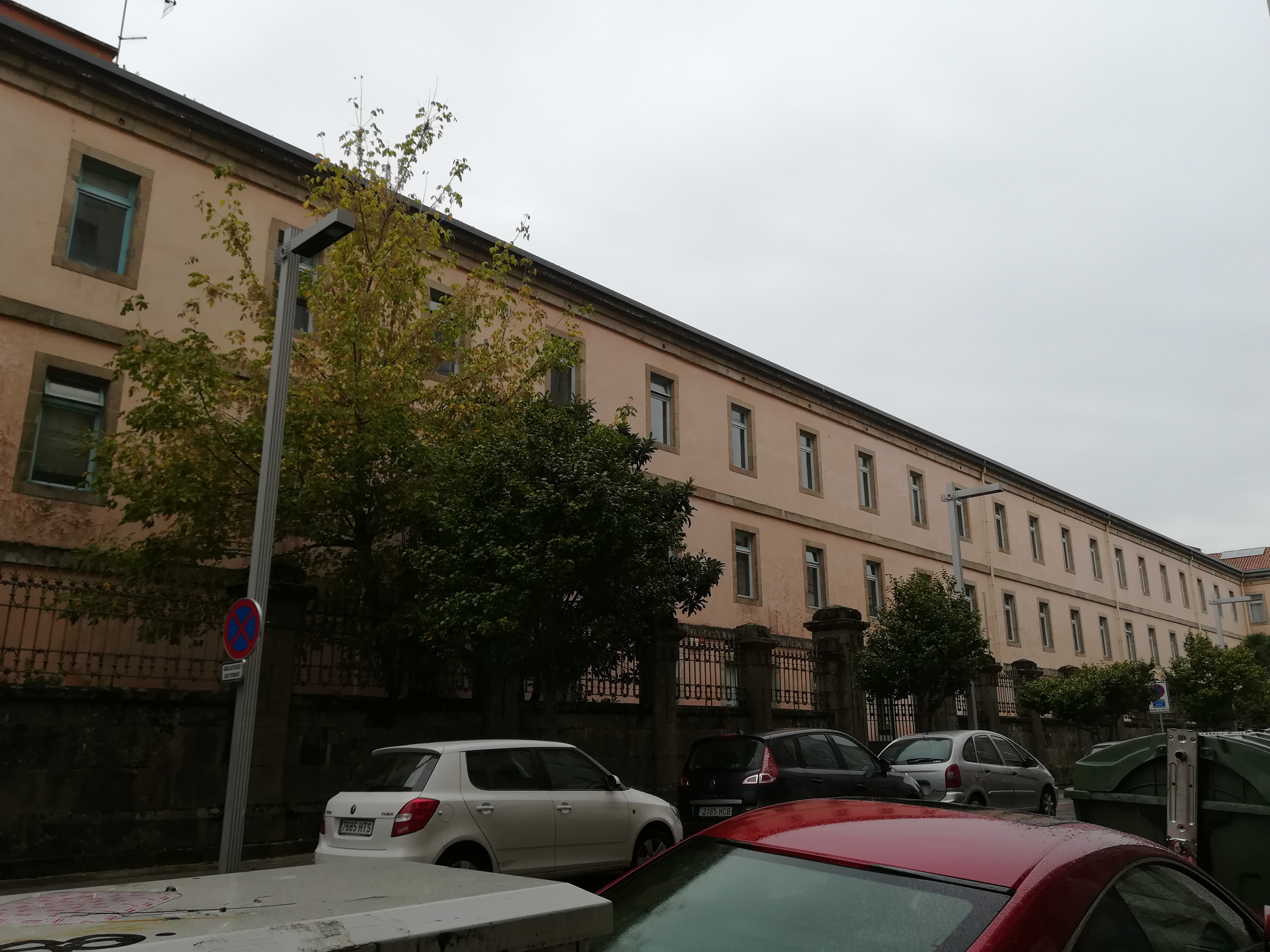
East side facade

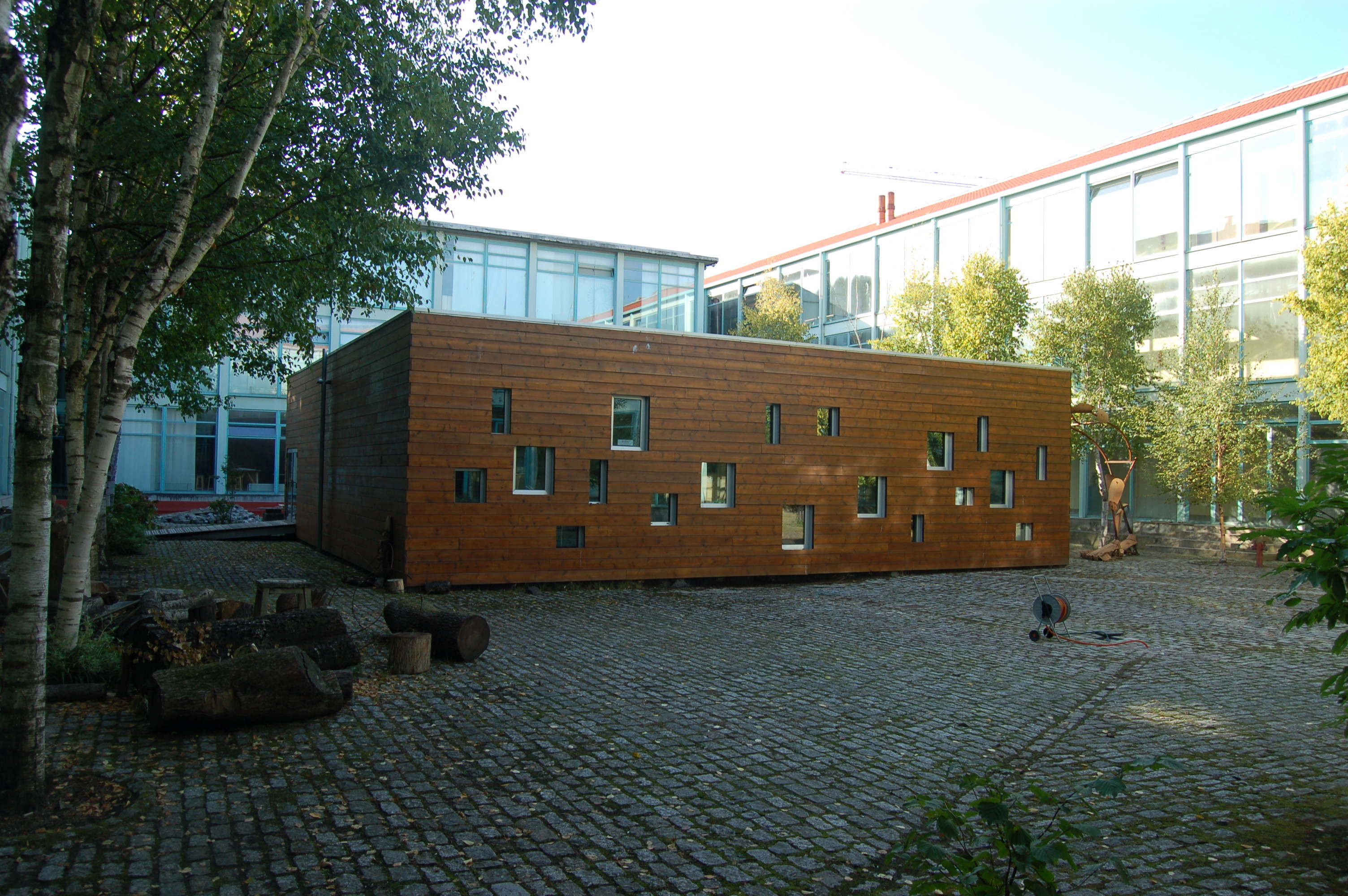
Old central courtyard

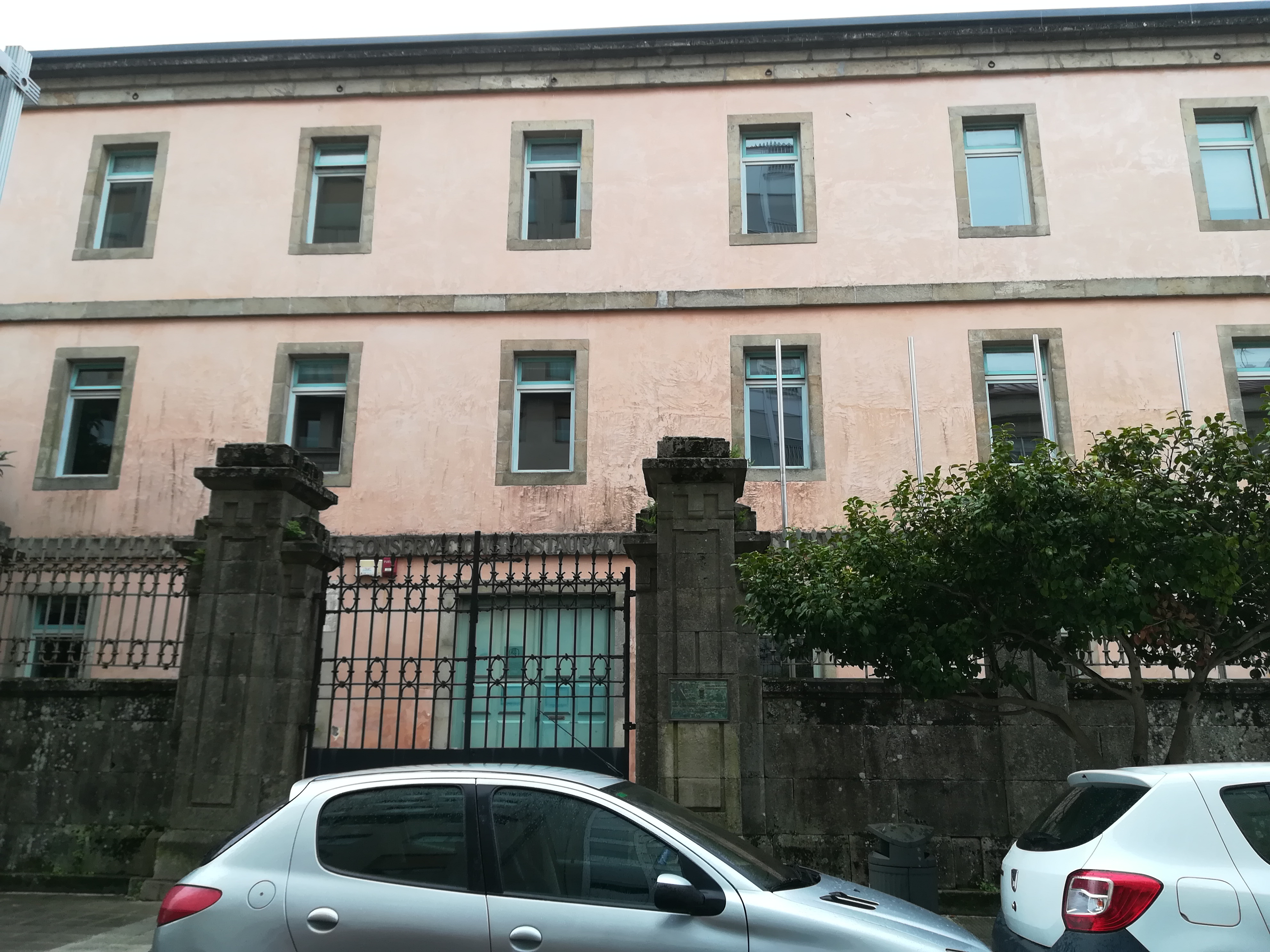
Side facade

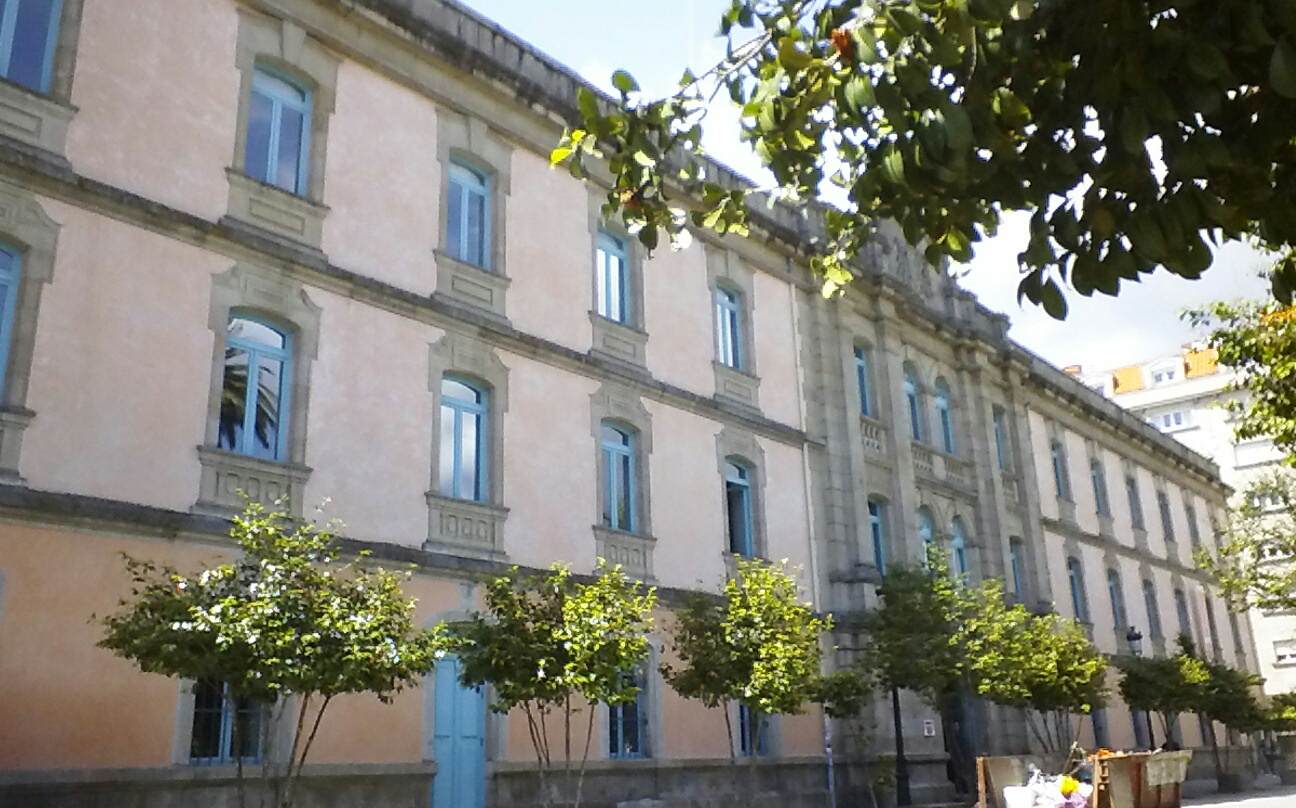
Façade in front of the Marescot Gardens

== See also ==
=== Bibliography ===
- Aganzo, Carlos (2010). Pontevedra. Ciudades con encanto (in Spanish). Madrid: El País-Aguilar. p. 93. ISBN 978-8403509344.
- Fontoira Surís, Rafael (2009). Pontevedra Monumental (in Galician). Pontevedra: Diputación de Pontevedra. p. 417. ISBN 978-84-8457-327-2.
- González Zúñiga, Claudio (1848). Descripción Geográfica, Estadística, Económica e Histórica de la Ciudad Capital de Pontevedra (in Spanish). Pontevedra: Establecimiento Tipográfico de la Viuda de Pintos. p. 8.
- Portela Fernández-Jardón, César; Rodríguez Abilleira, Jaime (1993). Proyecto de remodelación del cuartel de San Fernando en Pontevedra para su adecuación a Facultad de Bellas Artes y Escuela de Restauración (in Spanish). Pontevedra: Diputación de Pontevedra. Servicio de Publicaciones.
- Riveiro Tobío, Elvira (2008). Descubrir Pontevedra (in Spanish). Pontevedra: Edicións do Cumio. p. 50. ISBN 9788482890852.
- Sánchez Pingarrón, Julián (2018). Orígenes y desarrollo de la política de enajenación de infraestructuras militares en España. La reconversión de espacios militares para uso universitario (PDF) (in Spanish). Madrid: UNED. p. 166-171.

=== Related articles ===
- Alameda de Pontevedra
- Faculty of Fine Arts of Pontevedra
- Higher School for the Conservation and Restoration of Cultural Property in Galicia

=== External links ===
- Orígenes y desarrollo de la política de enajenación de infraestructuras militares en España. La reconversión de espacios militares para uso universitario (PhD thesis UNED, 2018)
- Saint Ferdinand Barracks
- Saint Ferdinand Barracks in Pontevedra
