= The Alameda =

The Alameda may refer to:

- The Alameda (Baltimore), street in Baltimore, Maryland
- The Alameda (Los Angeles), below grade freight rail expressway
- The Alameda (San Jose), street in Santa Clara County, California
- Alameda de las Pulgas, sometimes called The Alameda, a street between San Carlos and Menlo Park, California
- The Alameda (Indianapolis, Indiana), apartment building on the National Register of Historic Places

== See also ==
- Alameda (disambiguation)
