= Higher School for the Conservation and Restoration of Cultural Property in Galicia =

Higher School in Pontevedra, Spain

- Escuela Superior De Conservación y Restauración de Bienes Culturales de Galicia
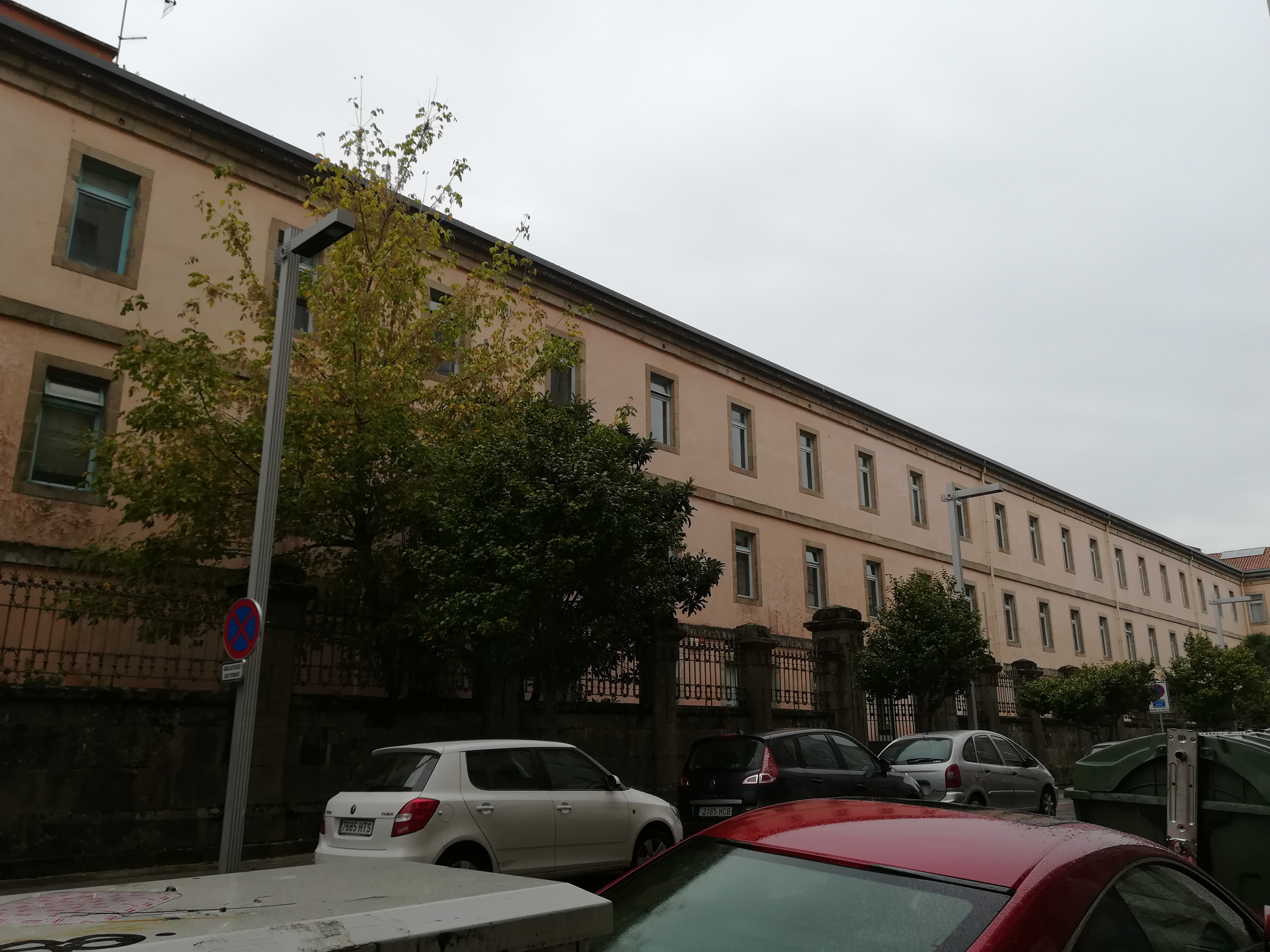
- Higher School of Conservation and Restoration façade
- Type: Public Higher School
- Established: 1991
- Affiliations: Xunta de Galicia
- Director: Carmen Lorenzo Rivera
- Total staff: 20
- Students: more than 100
- Location: Pontevedra, Province of Pontevedra, Galicia, Spain; 42°25′56.0″N 8°38′57.6″W
- Campus: City centre
- Website: escolaconservacion.gal/..

The School of Conservation and Restoration of the Cultural Property of Galicia (ESCRBBCCG) is a Spanish higher education institution of the Ministry of Culture and Education of the Xunta de Galicia. It is located in Pontevedra, in the former Saint Ferdinand Barracks, in the same building as the Faculty of Fine Arts. It is the only Higher School of Conservation and Restoration of Cultural Heritage in Galicia and the northwest of Spain and is the second oldest restoration school in Spain.

== Location ==
The building is located at 1, General Martitegui Street in Pontevedra.

== History ==
The school has been offering conservation and restoration studies since 12 January 1992. It awards the Higher Diploma in Conservation and Restoration of Heritage and Cultural Property. The creation of the Higher School of Conservation and Restoration of Cultural Property of Galicia in Pontevedra dates back to 1991 with Decree 352/1991 of 17 October (DOG (Official Galician Journal) of 24 October).

Between December 1994 and January 1995, the renovation of the building intended to house the Galician Higher School of Cultural Heritage was completed. In 1995, the school, created in 1991, moved in.

== The training ==
The school delivers the Higher Degree in Conservation and Restoration of Heritage and Cultural Property. The studies last four years, the first two years being common and the last two years being specialised. The three specialities taught in this institution are conservation-restoration of sculptural assets, conservation-restoration of pictorial assets and conservation-restoration of archaeological assets.

The first two years of study focus on conservation and restoration techniques, with a study of biology, physics and chemistry related to restoration and art history. In the final two years, there is a specialisation according to the option chosen, in which the technique and theory of each section are studied in depth.

=== Admission of cultural heritage conservators ===
The school is public and requires a high school degree and a specific admission exam. The exam consists of two parts: a textual analysis (related to the school's subjects) and a plastic arts exam (for example, that a colour is degraded in three phases using white).

== Facilities ==
The large building of the school is the former neoclassical Saint Ferdinand Barracks, designed by the architect Bonifacio Menéndez Conde, built between 1906 and 1909 and renovated in 1994 by the architect César Portela Fernández-Jardón to become the headquarters of the higher school for the Conservation and Restoration of Cultural Property in Galicia.

The institution's library has more than 9,000 volumes, of which almost 6,000 were donated in July 2020 by the heirs of the doctor Manuel Carballal Lugrís, who lived in Pontevedra.

== Gallery ==
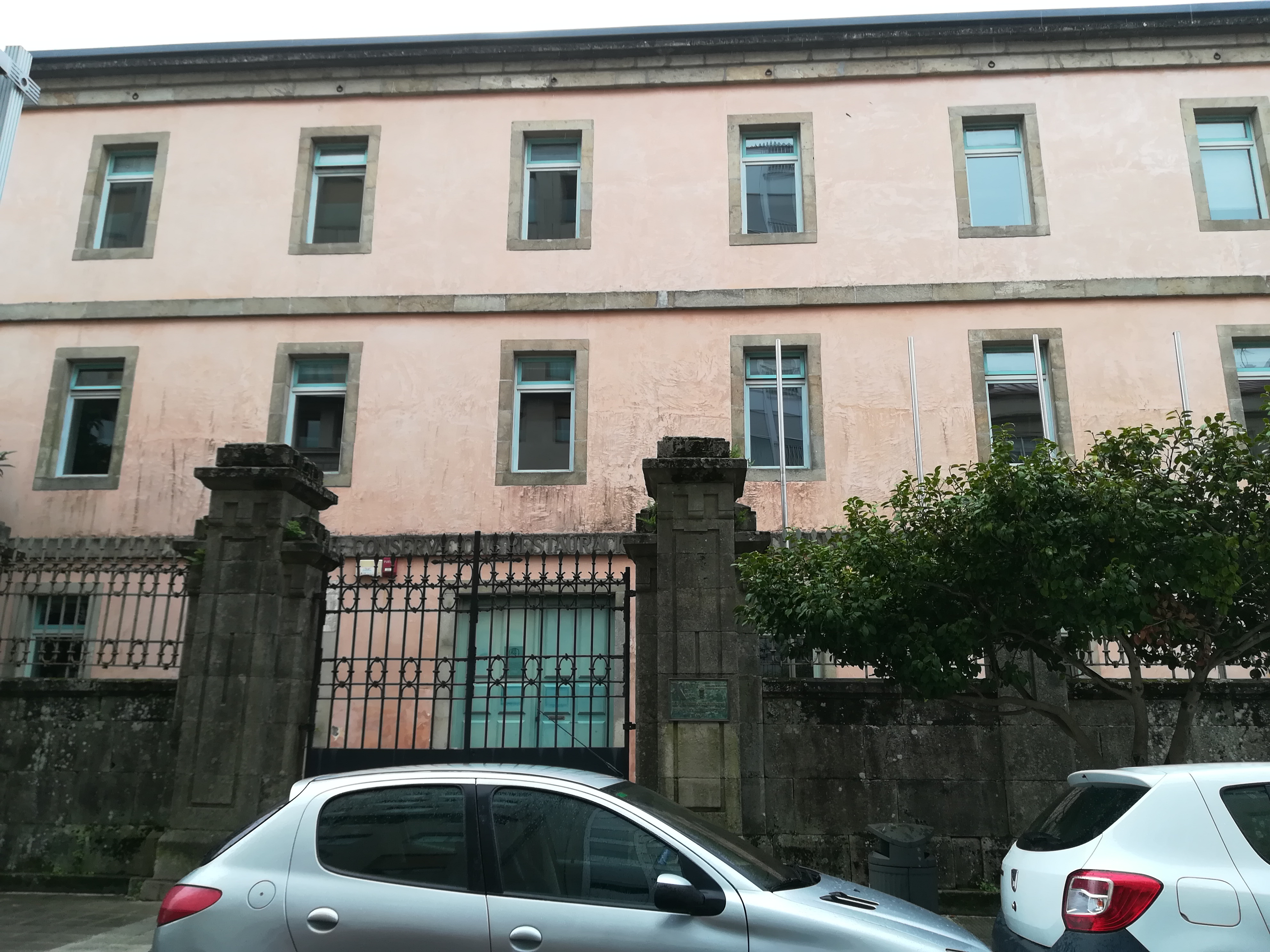
School entrance

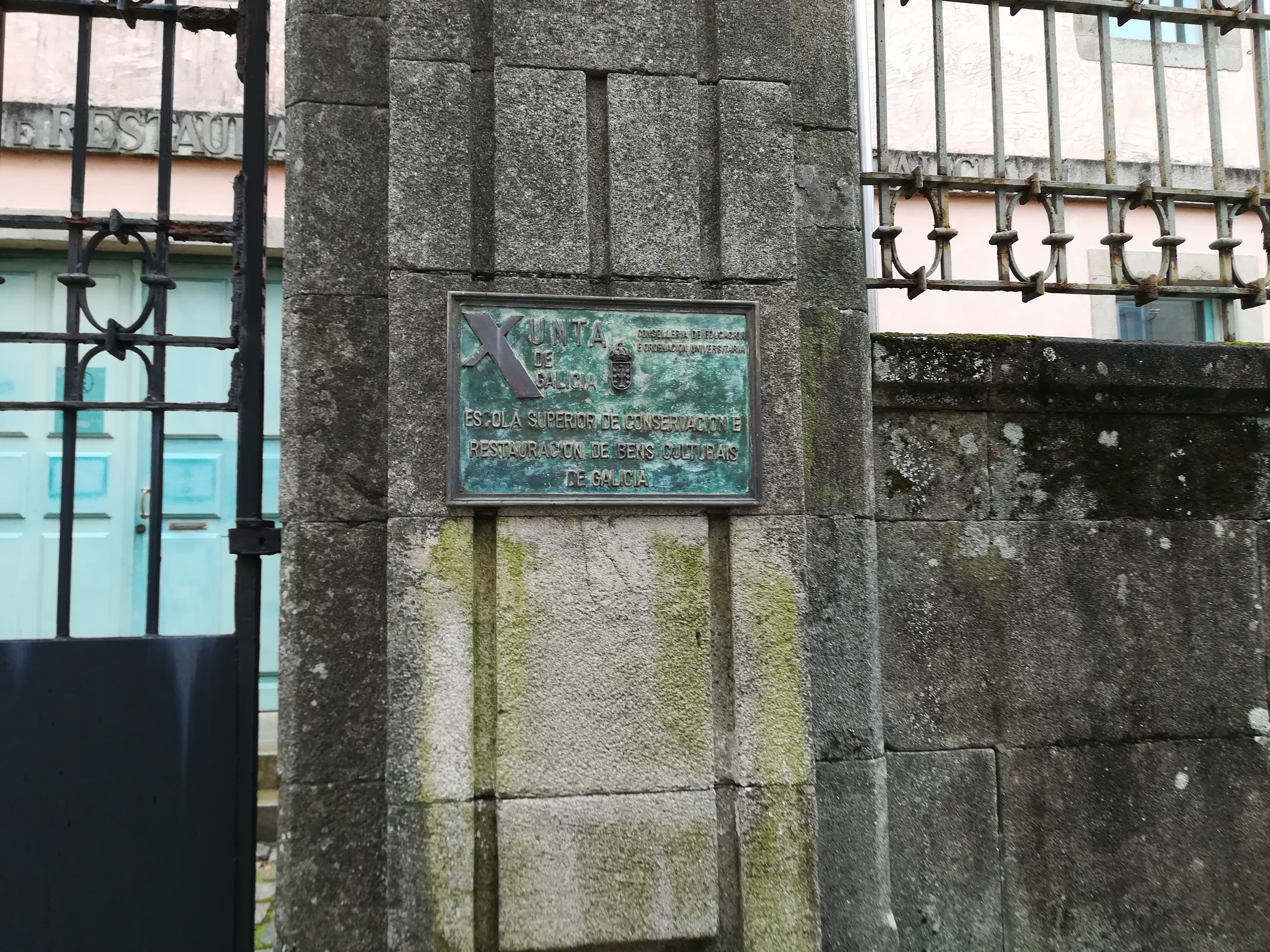
Plaque with the school's name

== See also ==
=== Related articles ===
- Faculty of Fine Arts of Pontevedra
- Xunta de Galicia

=== External links ===
- Official ESCRBBCCG website
