= Faculty of Fine Arts of Pontevedra =

Art school in Pontevedra, Spain

Fine Arts Faculty of Pontevedra
- Facultad de Bellas Artes de Pontevedra
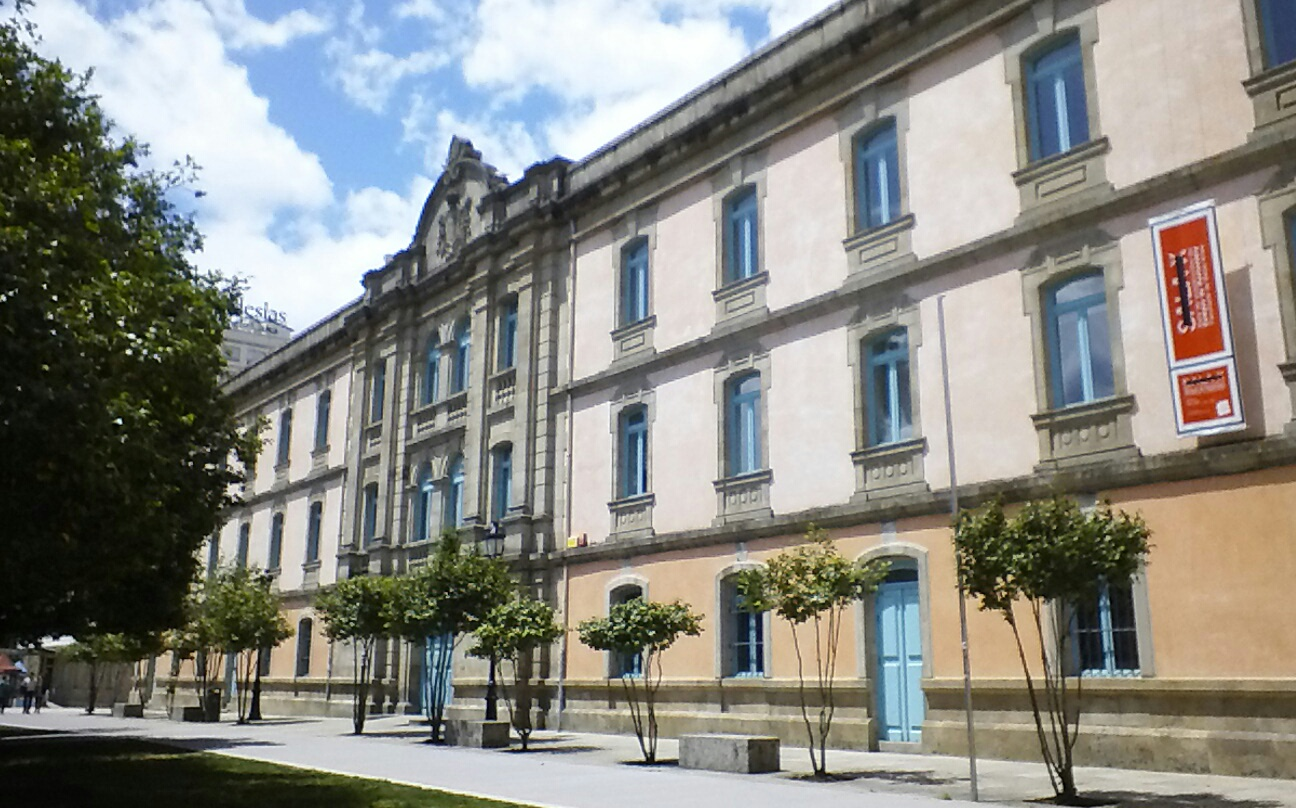
- Faculty façade
- Type: Public Faculty
- Established: 1990
- Parent institution: University of Vigo
- Affiliations: Pontevedra Campus
- Students: 700
- Location: Pontevedra, Spain; 42°25′54.3″N 8°38′55.9″W
- Campus: City centre

The Faculty of Fine Arts of Pontevedra is a university faculty founded in 1990 in the Spanish city of Pontevedra, based in the city centre, in the former Maestranza and old neoclassical barracks of Saint Ferdinand.

The faculty belongs to the Pontevedra Campus, integrated in the Galician University System and dependent on the University of Vigo. It offers undergraduate and postgraduate studies in Art. It is the only Faculty of Fine Arts in Galicia and northwestern Spain.

== Location ==
The building is located at 2, Maestranza Street in Pontevedra.

== History ==
In the 1980s, several art teachers led by Professor José Roselló Valle, as well as politicians of the time, such as the person in charge of culture of the Provincial Council of Pontevedra, Adriano Marques, fought and made multiple steps and efforts so that the city would have a Faculty of Fine Arts in the project for the creation of the future university, which was to be called University of Southern Galicia.

The Faculty of Fine Arts of Pontevedra was created in 1990 by Decree 416/1990, of 31 July, of the Ministry of Education and University Planning, in its article 14. The first programme was validated on 9 July 1990 and the programme of the University of Salamanca was adopted for the Faculty of Pontevedra, published for the first and second cycle of the curriculum in the Official State Bulletins of 20 July 1983 and 17 March 1987.

For the first four years, the Faculty of Fine Arts was provisionally housed in the former Provincial Hospice in Sierra Street, with a certain precariousness in terms of material means and space.

On 15 December 1994, the Faculty moved to its current location, the building of the former Saint Ferdinand Barracks, in the city centre, after a project to acquire and renovate the building: different departments of the Xunta de Galicia, the City Council of Pontevedra and the university provided the money to buy the building and the Provincial Council of Pontevedra financed the renovation work. According to the mayor at the time, Javier Cobián, the total project cost 2,000 million pesetas.

From the beginning, there was a great interaction between the students of the faculty and the city of Pontevedra, with installations, performances and artworks in the streets.

The patron saint of the faculty is Saint Ero and the faculty celebrates his feast day in May.

== Programmes ==
The faculty awards the University Degree in Fine Arts. The centre also hosts the master's degree in Fashion Design and Creative Direction and the PhD in Creation and Research in Contemporary Art.

== Facilities ==
The large building of the faculty is the former neoclassical Saint Ferdinand Barracks, designed by the architect Bonifacio Menéndez Conde, built between 1906 and 1909 and renovated in 1994 by the architect César Portela Fernández-Jardón to become the headquarters of the faculty and to house the Fine Arts studies.

The faculty has an exhibition room, the X Room, located at the entrance of the building.

The faculty's library has 55 periodical titles and over 10,000 volumes and has 108 reading places.

The faculty also has multi-purpose workshops, equipped with hand tools and specific machines (workshops for metal, wood, ceramics, plastic and other materials).

There is also an audiovisual laboratory, other laboratories for graphic techniques (intaglio) and photography and a computer room (for digital and 3D image processing and digital photographic processing).

== Deans ==
So far the deans of the faculty have been:

- 1990 : Juan Fernando de Laiglesia González de Peredo
- 1994 : José Chavete Rodríguez
- 1999 : Jesús Hernández Sánchez
- 2006 : Ignacio Barcia Rodríguez
- 2011 : Juan Carlos Meana Martínez
- 2015 : Silvia García González
- 2019 : Xosé Manuel Buxán Bran

== Gallery ==
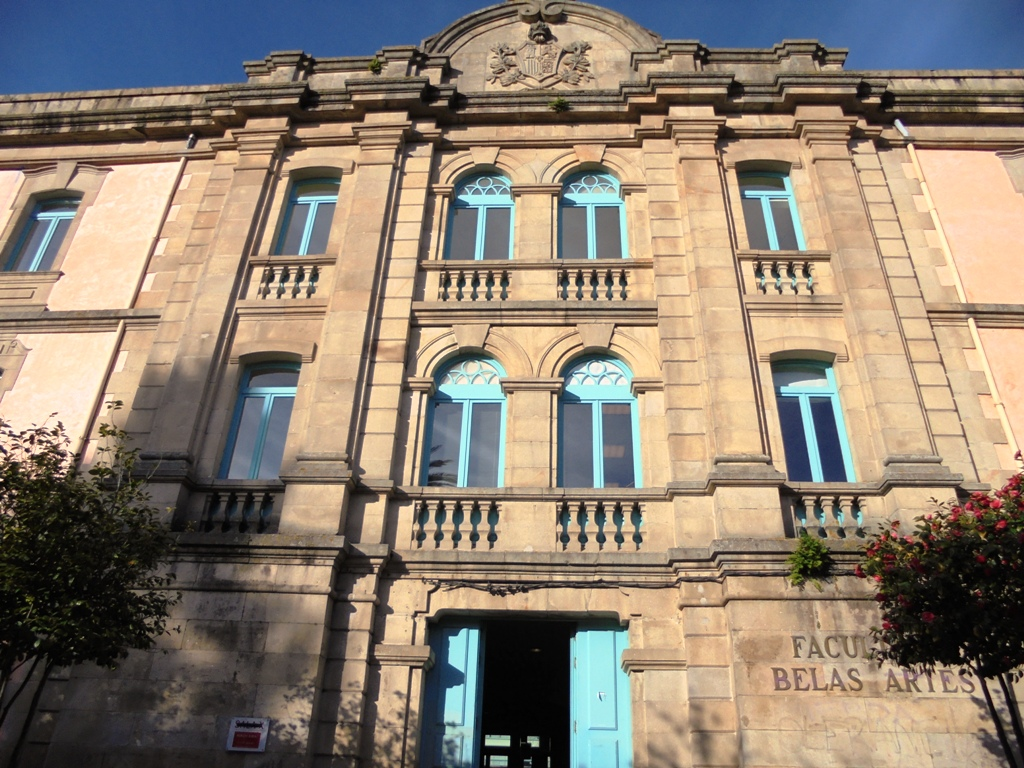
Entrance to the Faculty

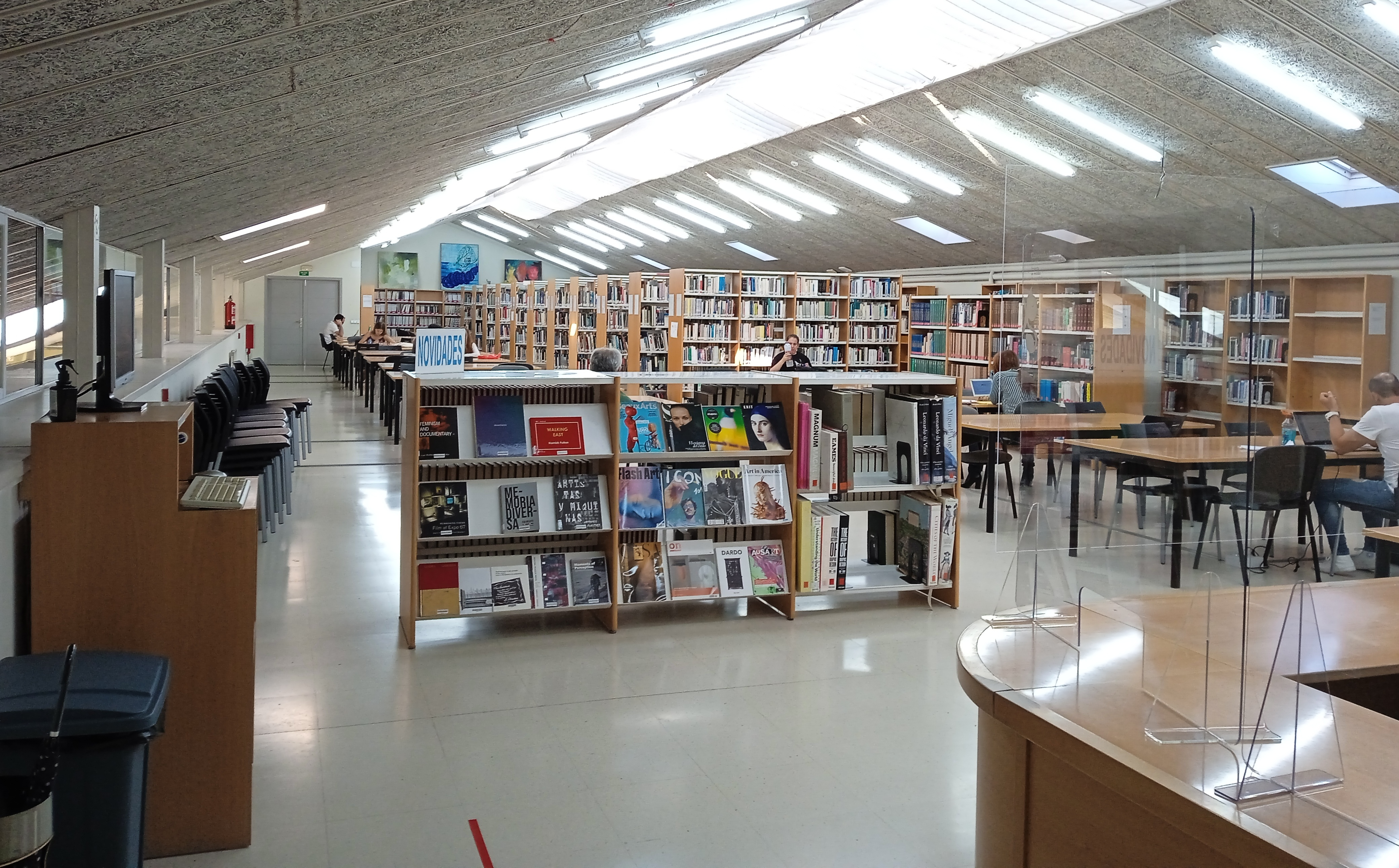
Library on the top floor

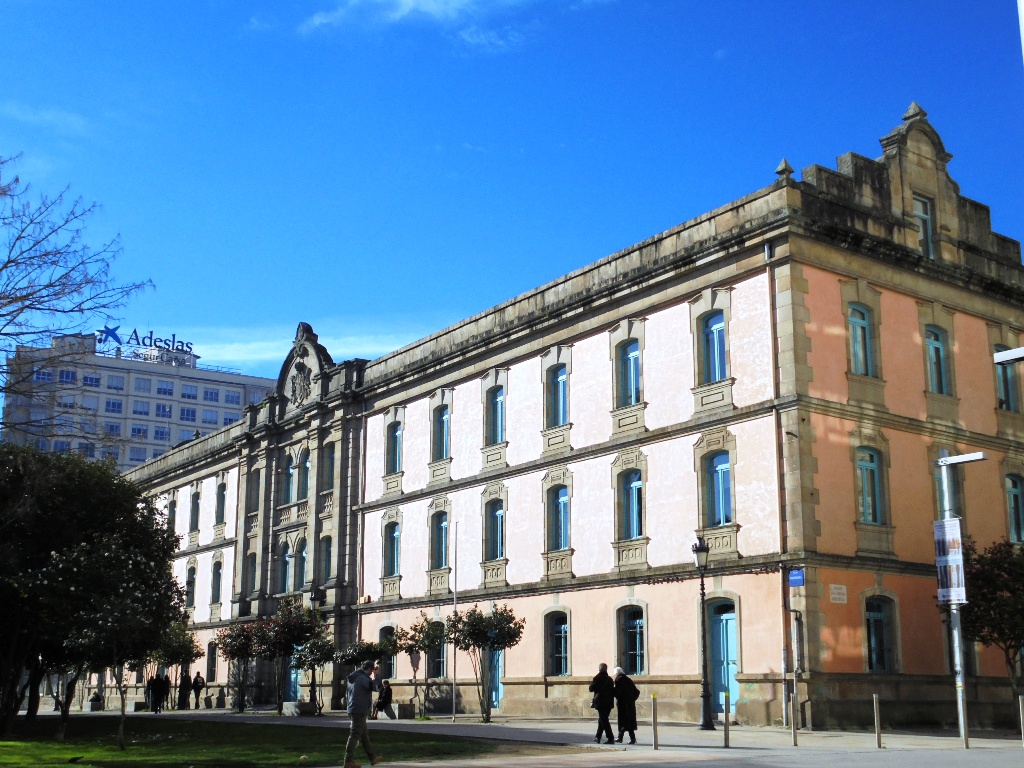
East and south facades of the faculty

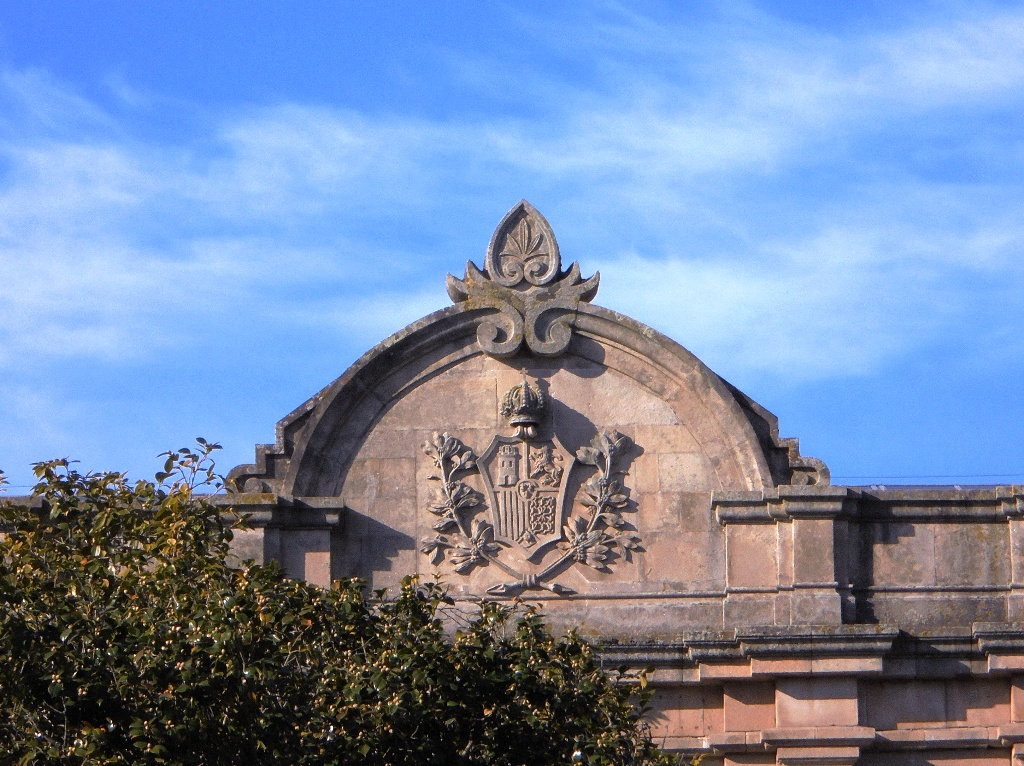
Spanish coat of arms at the top of the building

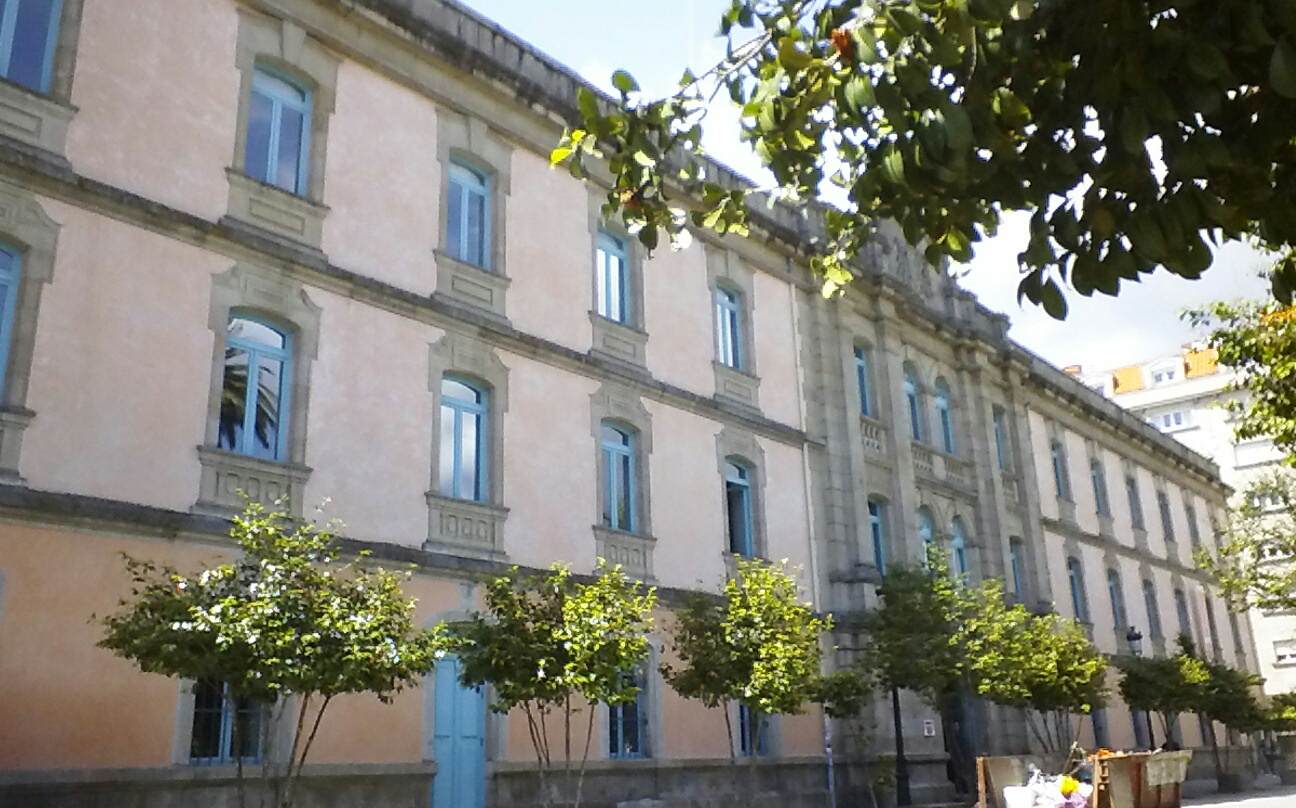
Main facade in front of the Doctor Marescot gardens

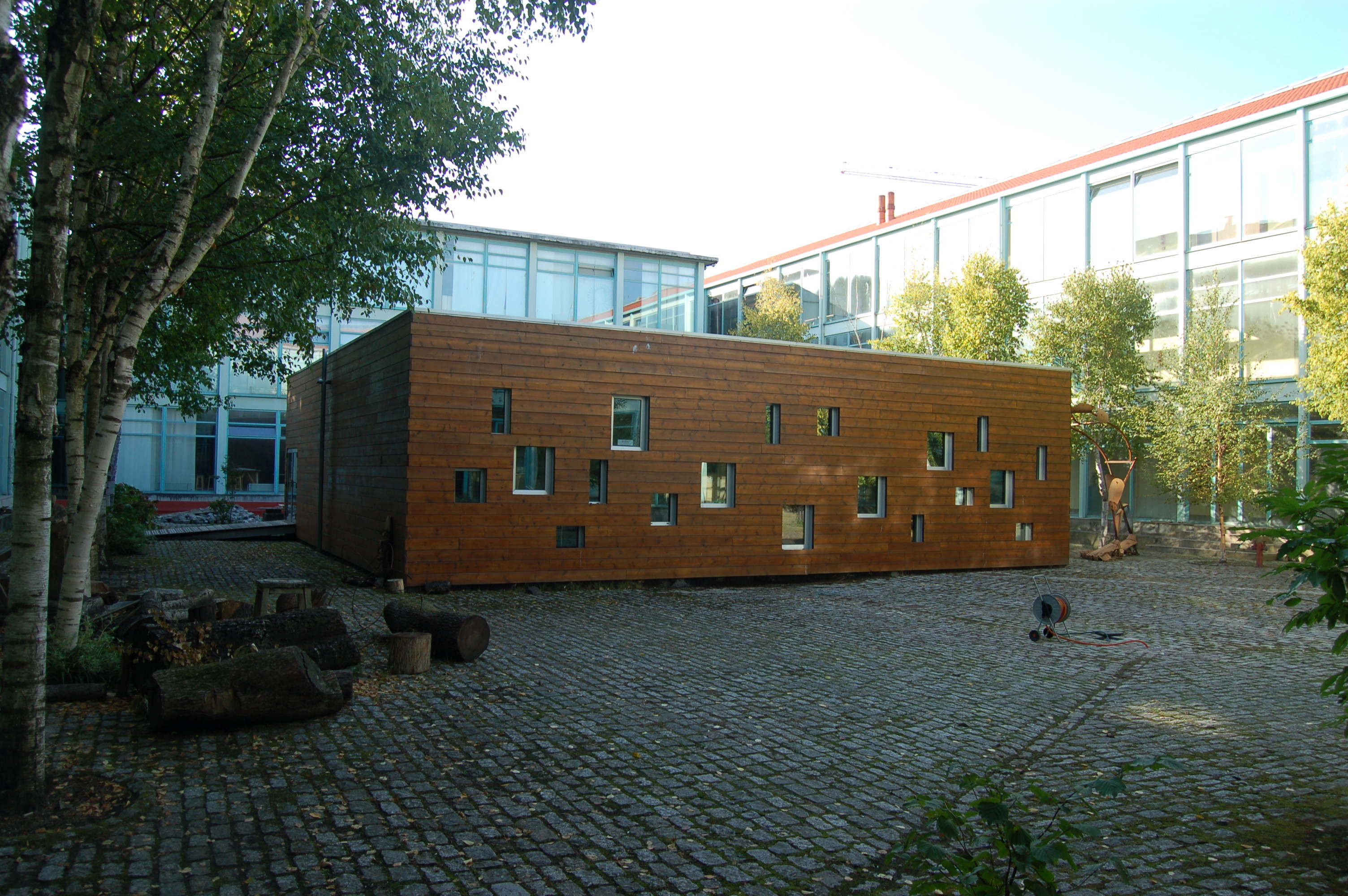
Courtyard

== See also ==
=== Bibliography ===
- De la Puerta, José María; Patio de las musas. Facultad de Bellas Artes de Pontevedra, Arquitectura Viva, number 43. Madrid 1995. p. 58-63.

=== Related articles ===
- Saint Ferdinand Barracks
- Higher School for the Conservation and Restoration of Cultural Property in Galicia
- Pontevedra Campus
- Faculty of Design of Pontevedra
- Faculty of Communication of Pontevedra

=== External links ===
- Former Saint Ferdinand barracks website
- Faculty of Fine Arts of Pontevedra website
- Renovation of the Saint-Ferdinand barracks for the Faculty of Fine Arts.
