= Alameda Theater =

Alameda Theater or Alameda Theatre may refer to:

- Alameda Theatre (Alameda), California
- Alameda Theater (East Los Angeles), California
- Alameda Theatre (San Antonio), Texas
- Historic Towne Theater in The Alameda, San Jose, California
