= Alameda de Pontevedra =

Park in Pontevedra (Spain)

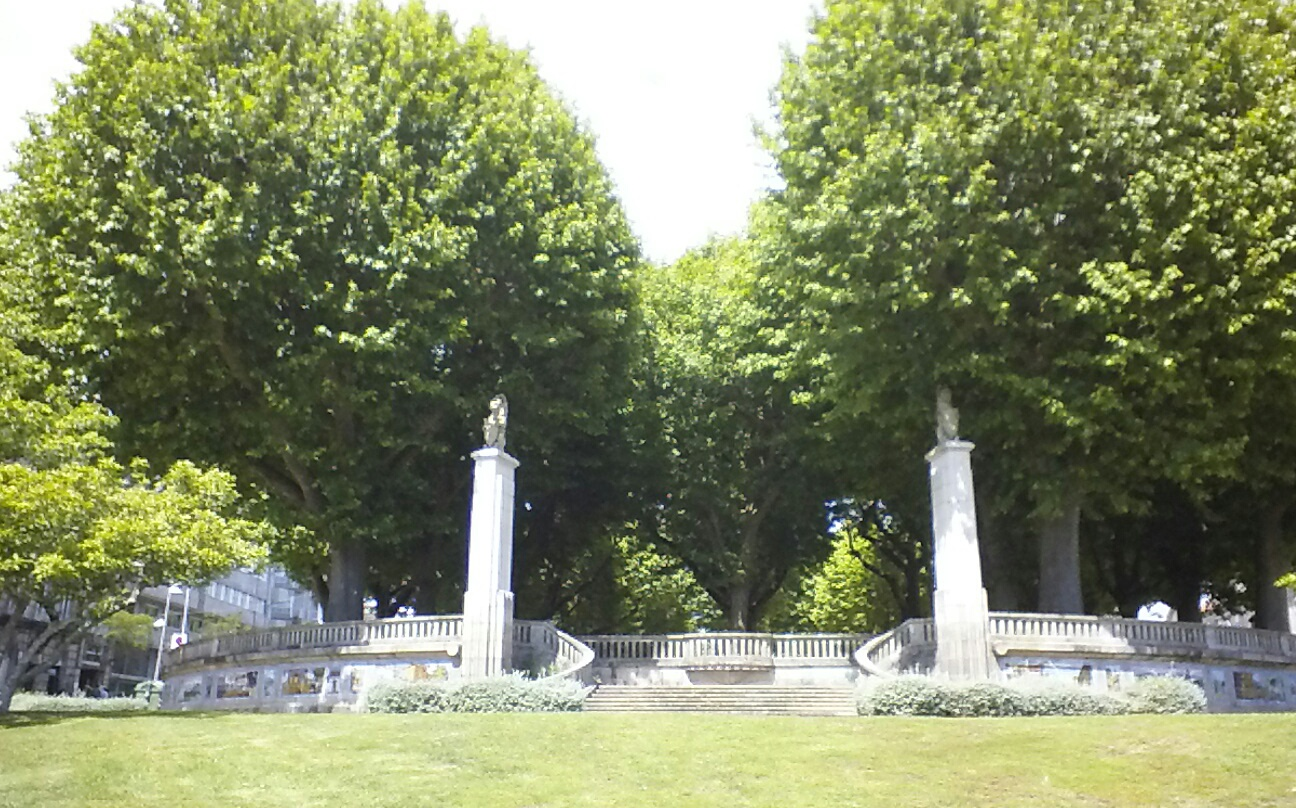
- Interactive map of Alameda de Pontevedra
- Location: Pontevedra, Spain
- Coordinates: 42.430502°N 8.649306°W
- Area: 0.021 km^{2} (0.0081 sq mi)
- Created: 1879 (present configuration)
- Operator: Municipality of Pontevedra
- Status: Public park

The Alameda del arquitecto Sesmero (translated as Alameda of architect Sesmero), popularly known as la Alameda by the Pontevedrians, is an urban park located in the city centre of Pontevedra in Spain. It is the largest urban green space in the centre of Pontevedra city, together with the Palm Trees Park. The Alameda is located to the west of the old town, close to the old fishermen's quarter of A Moureira.

== History ==
The Alameda de Pontevedra took its present configuration at the end of the 19th century as part of an ambitious project to extend the city to land outside the old walls of Pontevedra.

Before the development of this urban space as the Alameda, it was known as the Field of Truth (place of execution of convicted persons) and the Field of Wheels. It was here that ropes and rigging were made for fishing. After the construction of the convent of St. Dominic and because of its influence, it became known as the Field of St. Dominic.

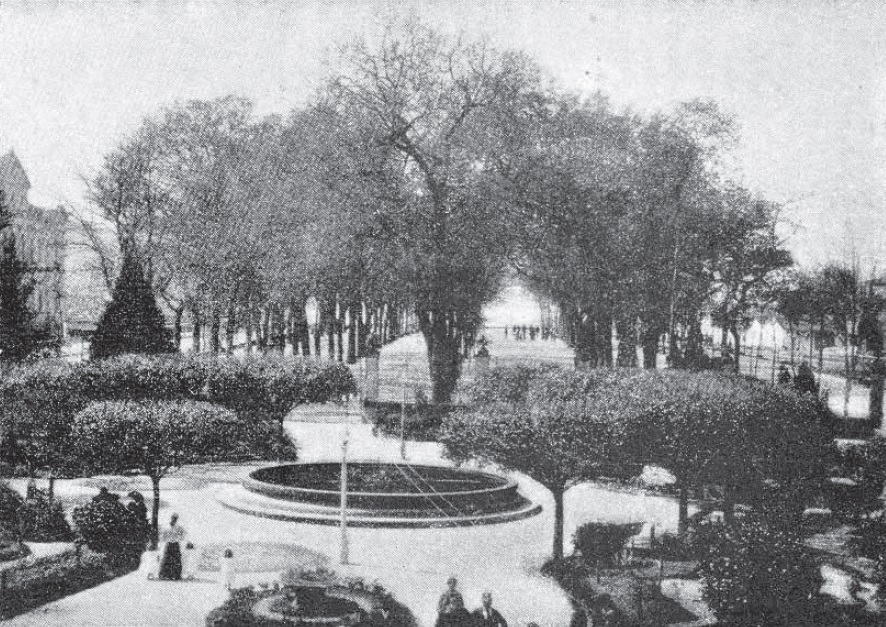
Alameda de Pontevedra in 1898

In 1648 the Dominicans transformed the orchard of their convent into a place for walking. Two centuries later, in 1846, a retaining wall was built, the ground was levelled, trees were planted and the first stone benches were put in place. In 1847, part of this field corresponding to the present-day Alameda was closed off with stone walls. The Alameda had five wide alleys delimited by trees in a straight line and a spacious promenade. There were 57 oaks and 91 acacias and views over the Pontevedra ria and the sea. The most elegant residents of the city used to stroll along it, especially on summer evenings, to breathe in the sea breeze.

It was with the urban expansion of the late 19th century, which made the architect Alejandro Sesmero effective, that the process of shaping this emblematic area was completed.

Sesmero designed a project for the Alameda de Pontevedra as part of the city's bourgeois expansion and officially presented it on 29 April 1879. In its early years, the Alameda was divided longitudinally into several parallel promenades, which, within a class society, were reserved for the use of each social category. The promenade closest to the present Gran Vía de Montero Ríos was reserved for nannies and maids, the adjacent promenade for the middle class or artisans and the two remaining promenades next to the present café El Cafetín were reserved for the bourgeois and noble classes.

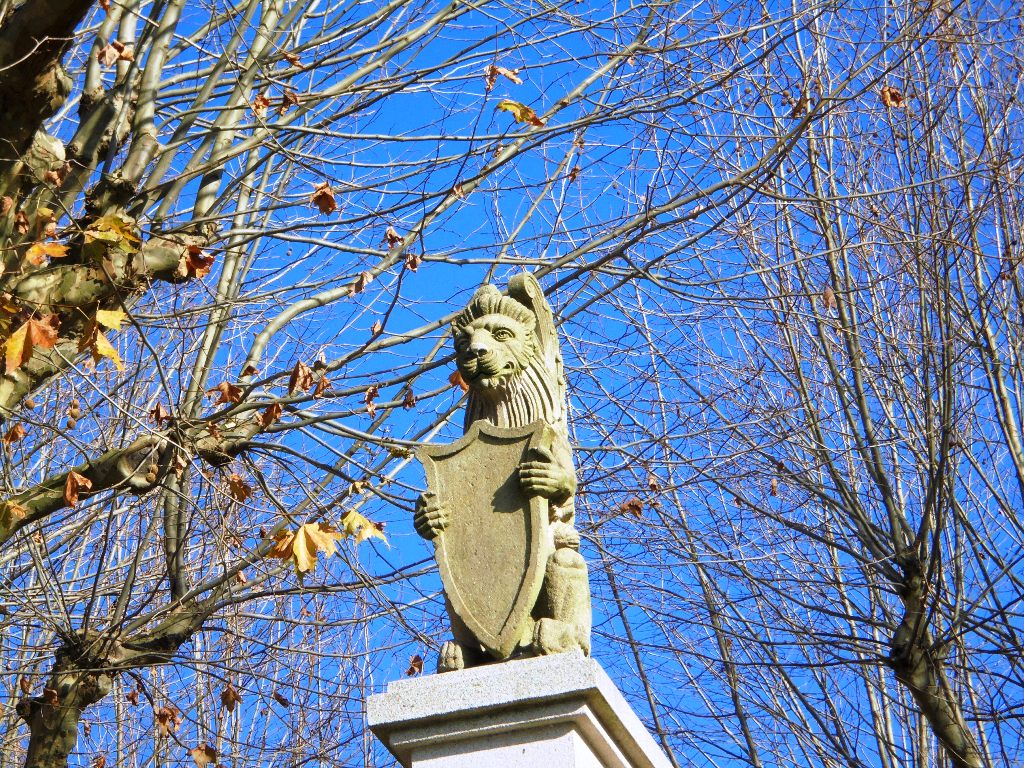
Stone lion at the western entrance to the Alameda with the city's coat of arms

In 1886 the architect Alejandro Sesmero was commissioned to design and budget the bandstand, as part of the urbanisation of the Alameda and Gran Vía. At the beginning of the 20th century, in 1904, the bandstand was inaugurated to host concerts by musicians or artists when the municipal band was created. The bandstand has a stone base and an iron and glass roof and in 1907 it was equipped with electric lights.

Later, in 1927, the City Council commissioned the municipal architect, Emilio Salado, to draw up a project to embellish the western part of the Alameda with a privileged view of the sea. Salado carried out a project clearly influenced by Art Deco and in 1928 a magnificent stone staircase was inaugurated, decorated with two large pillars six metres high, finished with effigies of stone lions supporting the city's coat of arms. In the 1950s, these pillars were greatly reduced to the height of the balustrade. The stone lions that crowned them were replaced by ciboria in the form of flower pots. In 2010, the pillars and lions were returned to their original position and design.

The current El Cafetín, located on the north side of the Alameda, is reminiscent of an old café from the beginning of the 20th century, which was in fact just a small kiosk offering drinks and other related products. In 1987, El Cafetín was opened with its current aesthetic.

== Description ==
The Alameda has an oblong or oval surface that runs from the vicinity of the Pontevedra City Hall in the Plaza de España in the direction of San Roque (former Moureiras). Lines of trees divide it longitudinally into several parallel promenades. Together with the Gran Vía de Montero Ríos, it has an area of 21,000 m2.

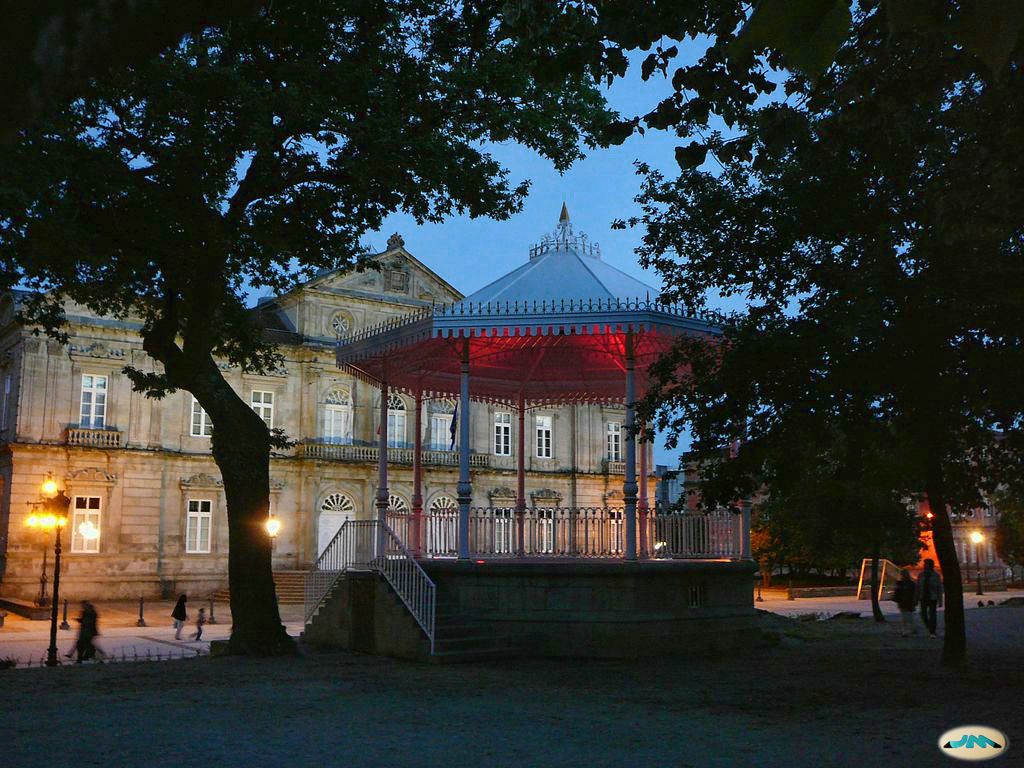
Bandstand

The western side of the Alameda is bounded by a viewpoint that ends in a stone staircase. This staircase is flanked by two six-metre high columns on which are placed the effigies of two stone lions bearing the city's coat of arms. On the circular walls that delimit this southern part there are mosaics of Tiles made by Carlos Sobrino. On the Alameda side of the Gran Via de Montero Ríos is the bandstand.

Carlos Sobrino created twenty-three tiles for the Alameda de Pontevedra with different landscapes and scenes, both rural and urban, painted in 1927 and made in Seville. These mosaics have been completely restored as part of the renovation work that was carried out in the park's surroundings in 2010.

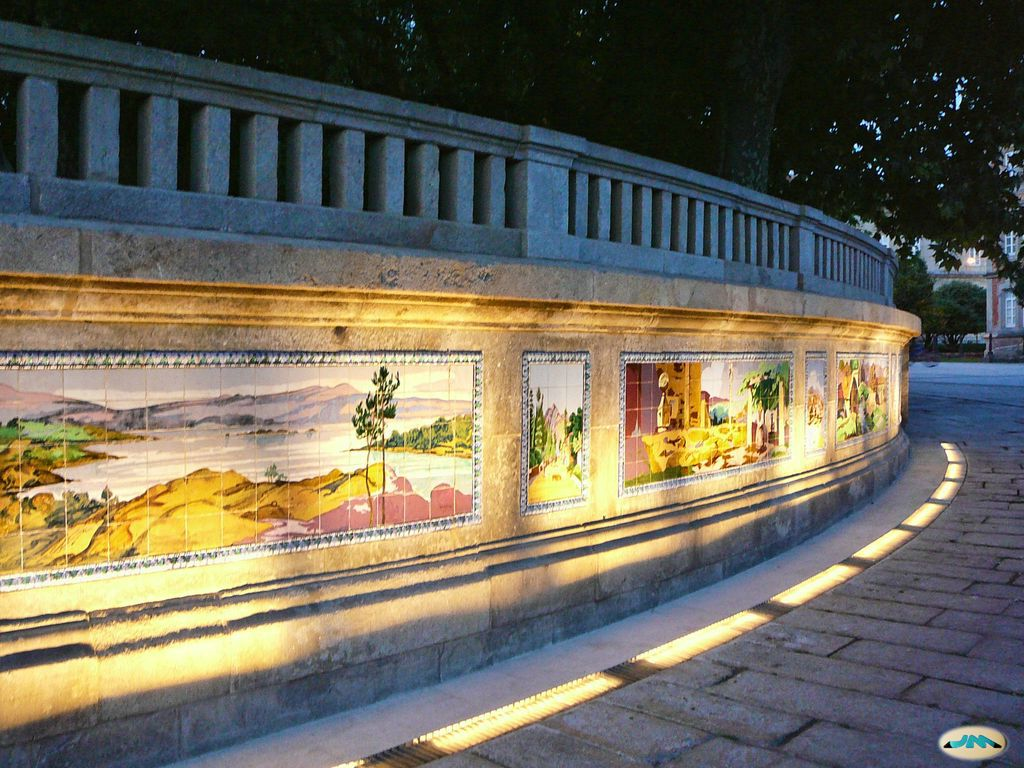
Tiles by Carlos Sobrino

The scenes illustrate traditional customs and architecture: people in typical costumes, the Hórreos of Combarro, the chapel of Nuestra Señora de la Lanzada or the Plaza de la Leña in the old town, among others.

The Alameda is bounded on its eastern side by the monument to the heroes of Puente Sampayo, designed by Julio González-Pola y García in 1911 to mark the first centenary of the Battle of Puente Sampayo against the French.

The Alameda remains true to its original 19th century design and layout. It retains the earthen floor with paths delimited by five rows of trees, mainly poplars, black poplars, plane trees, lime-trees, Alders, Oaks, and two common hawthorn, stone benches and an octagonal bandstand. The eastern entrance is presided over by an araucaria heterophylla, a tree about 30 metres high, the largest in the alameda. It is separated from the paved boulevard called Gran Vía de Montero Ríos by sections of stone stairs.

== Gallery ==
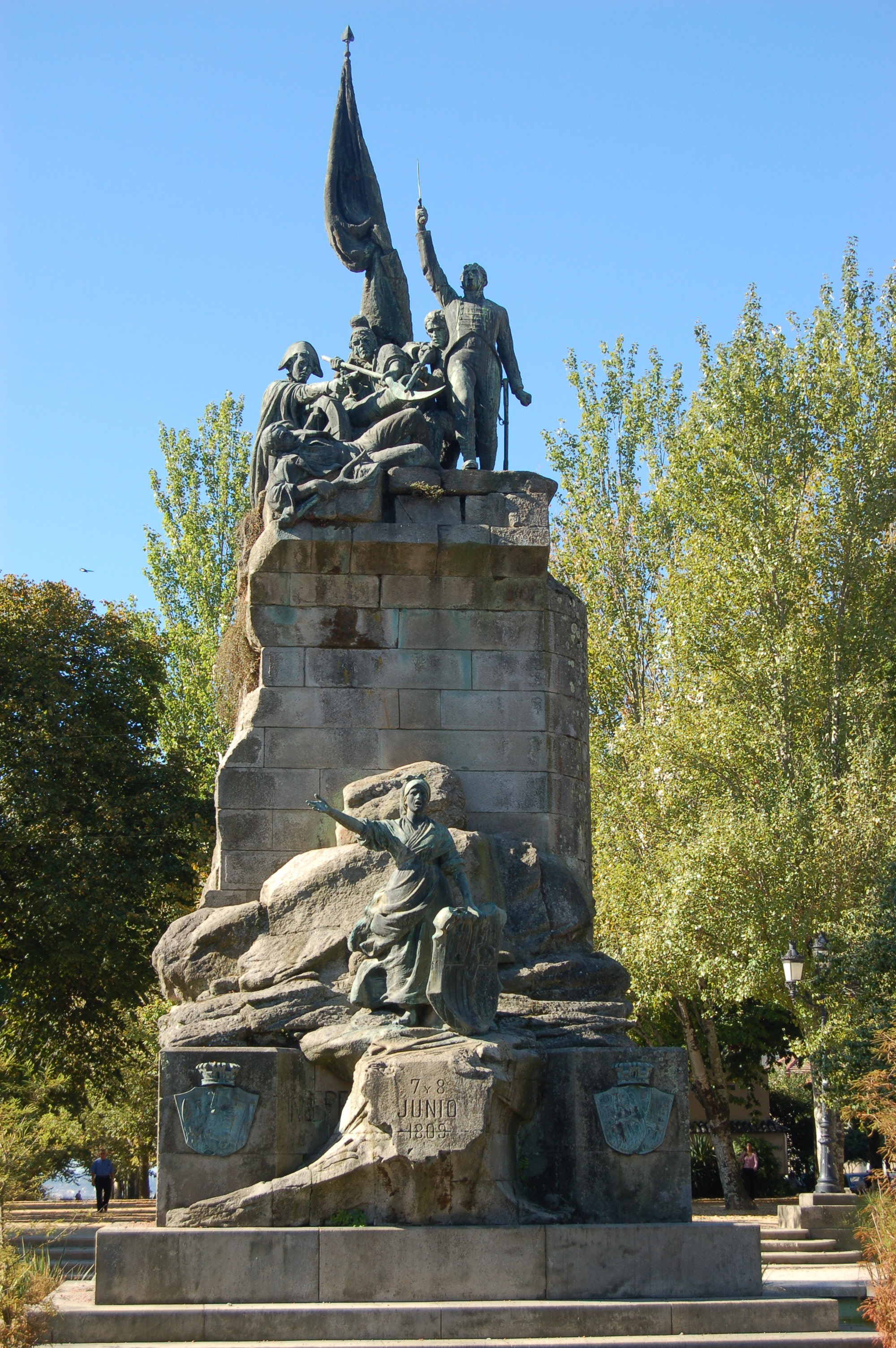
Monument to the heroes of Puente Sampayo

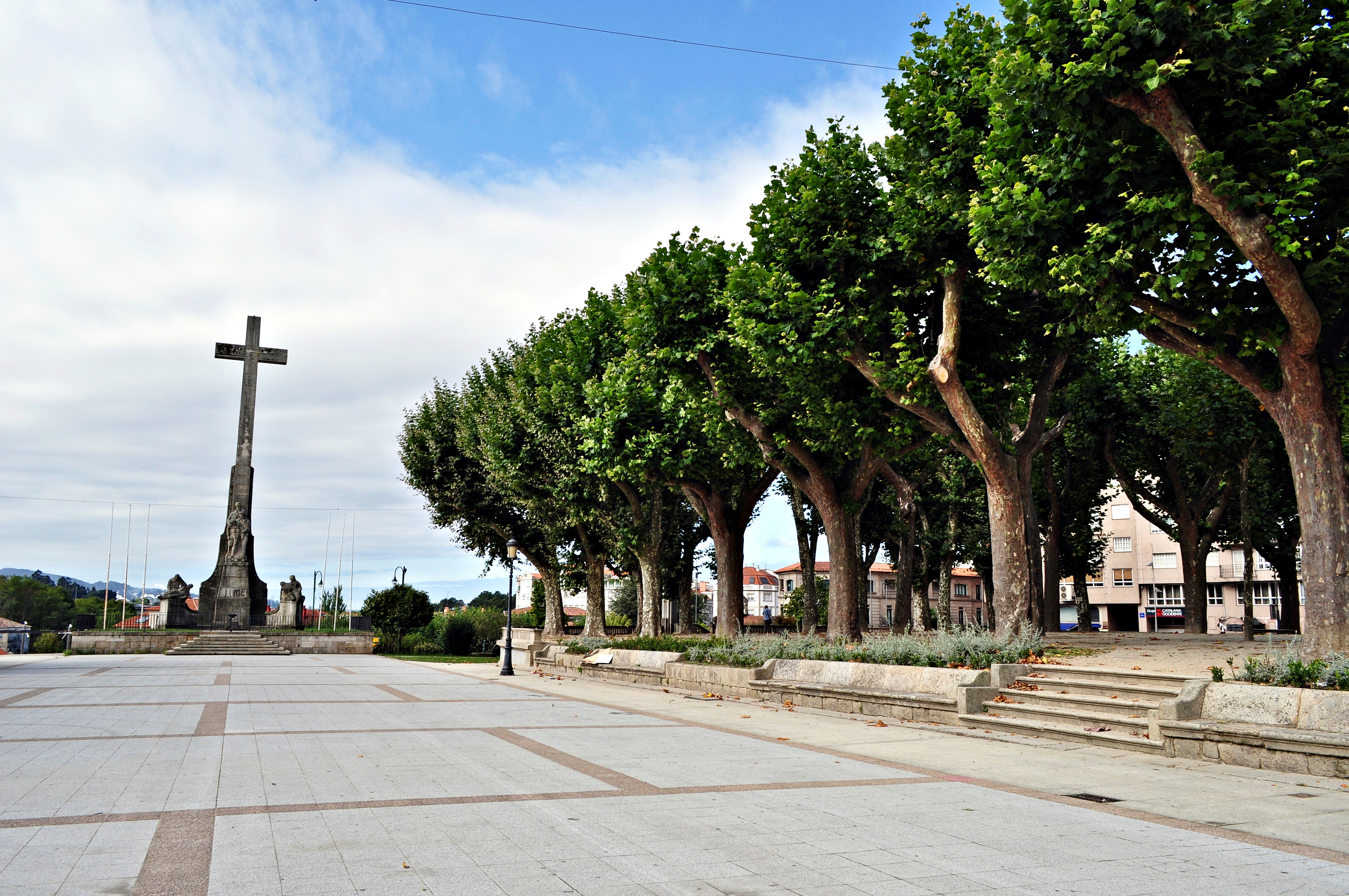

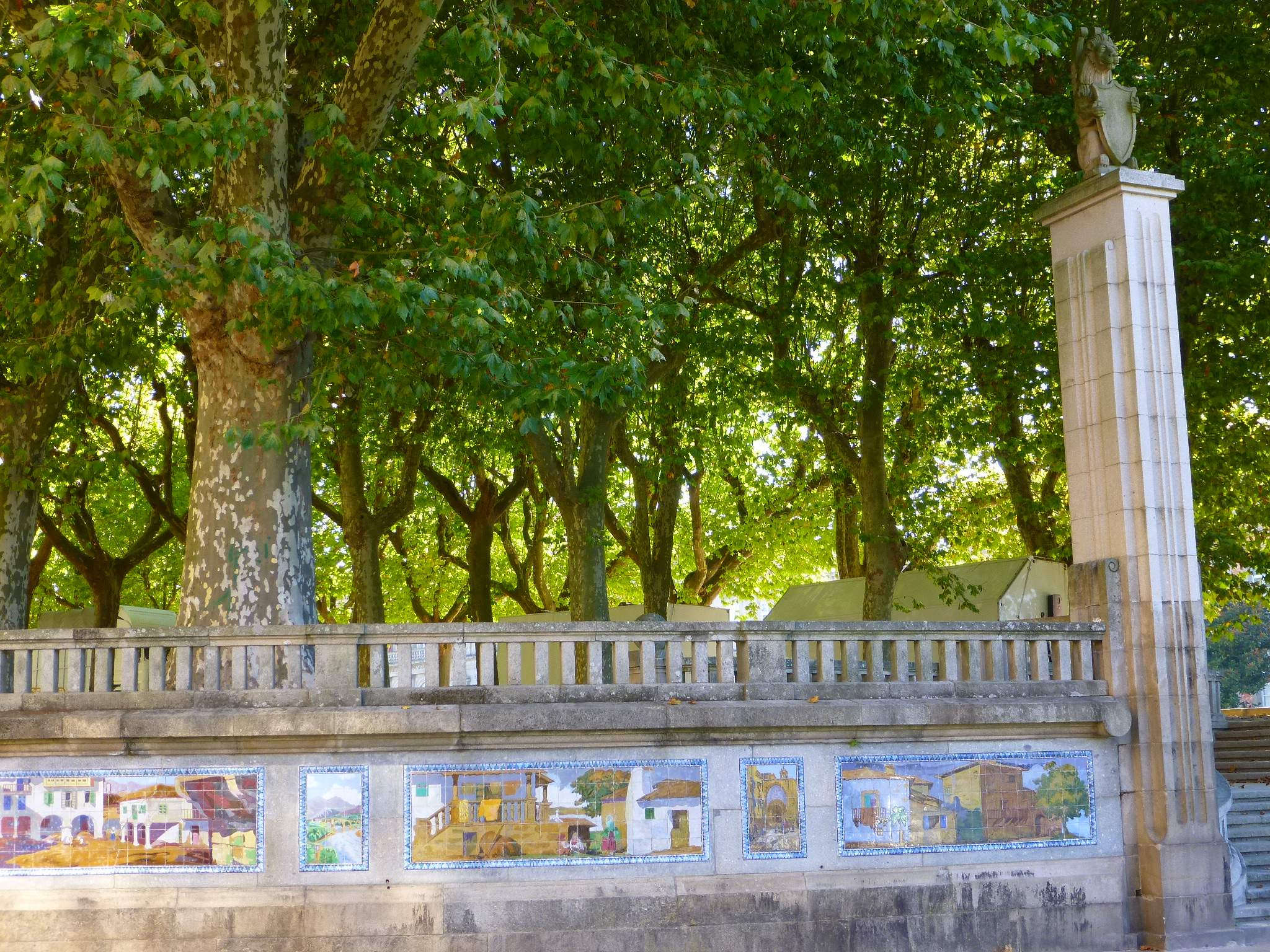

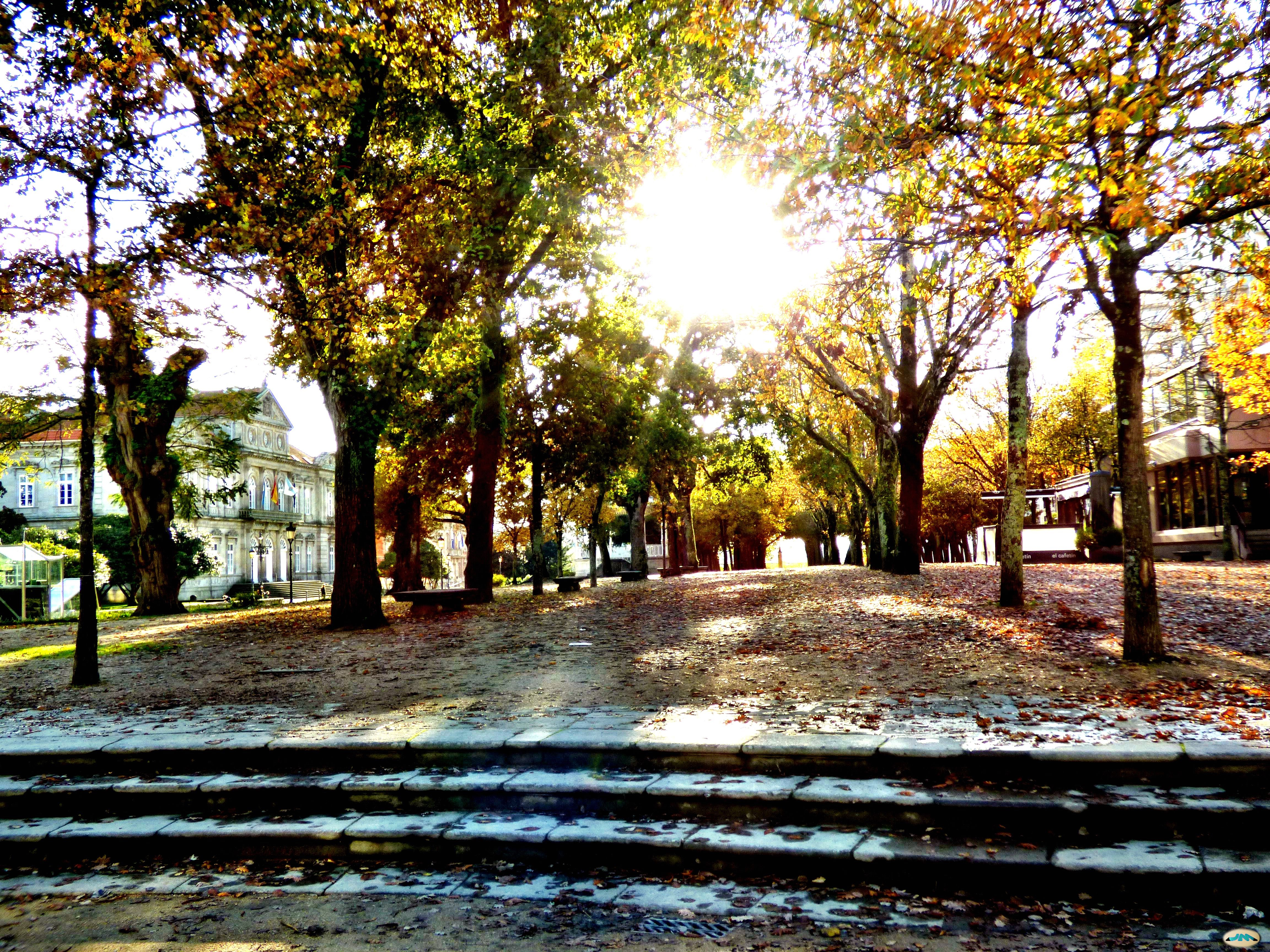

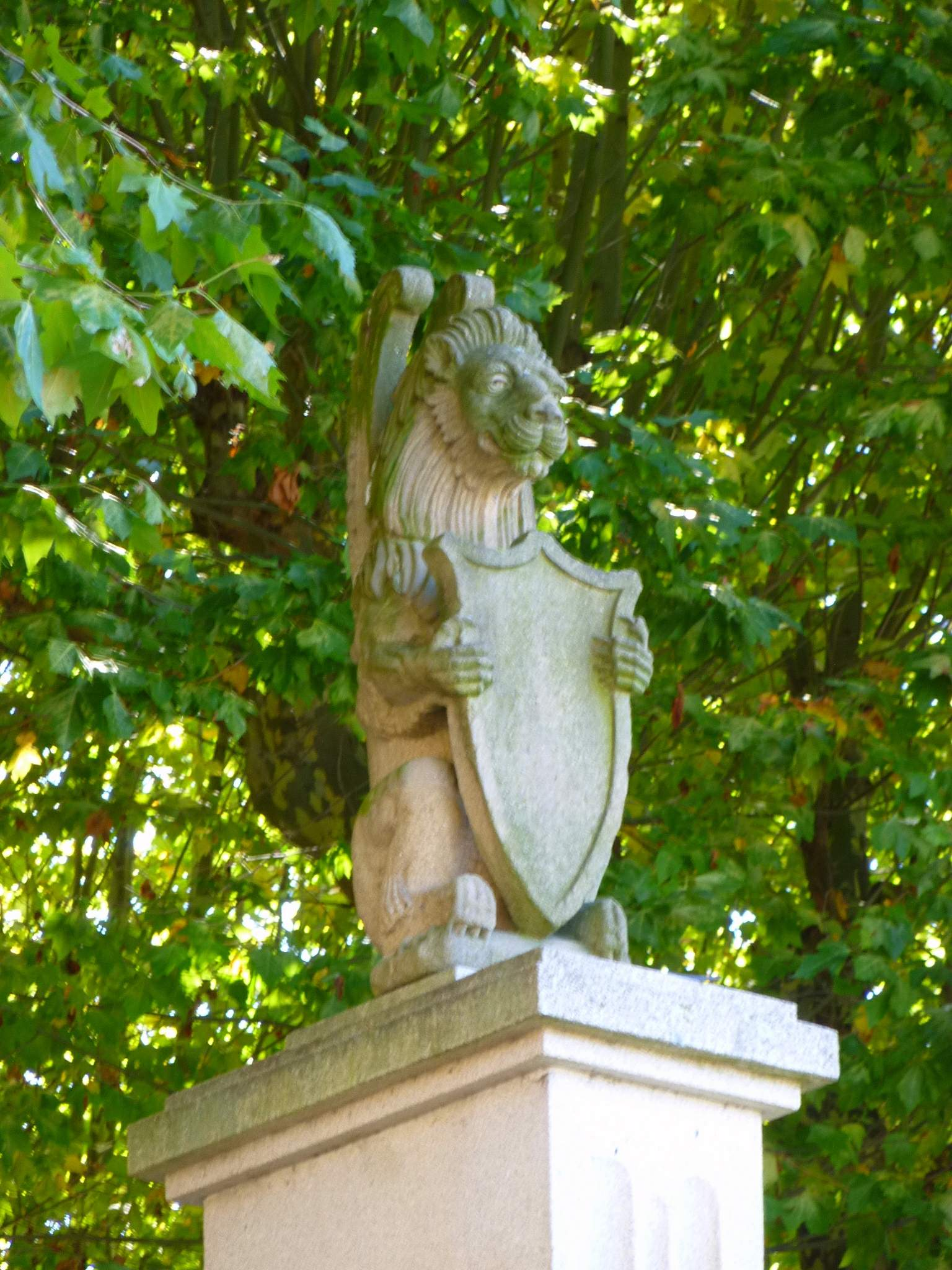

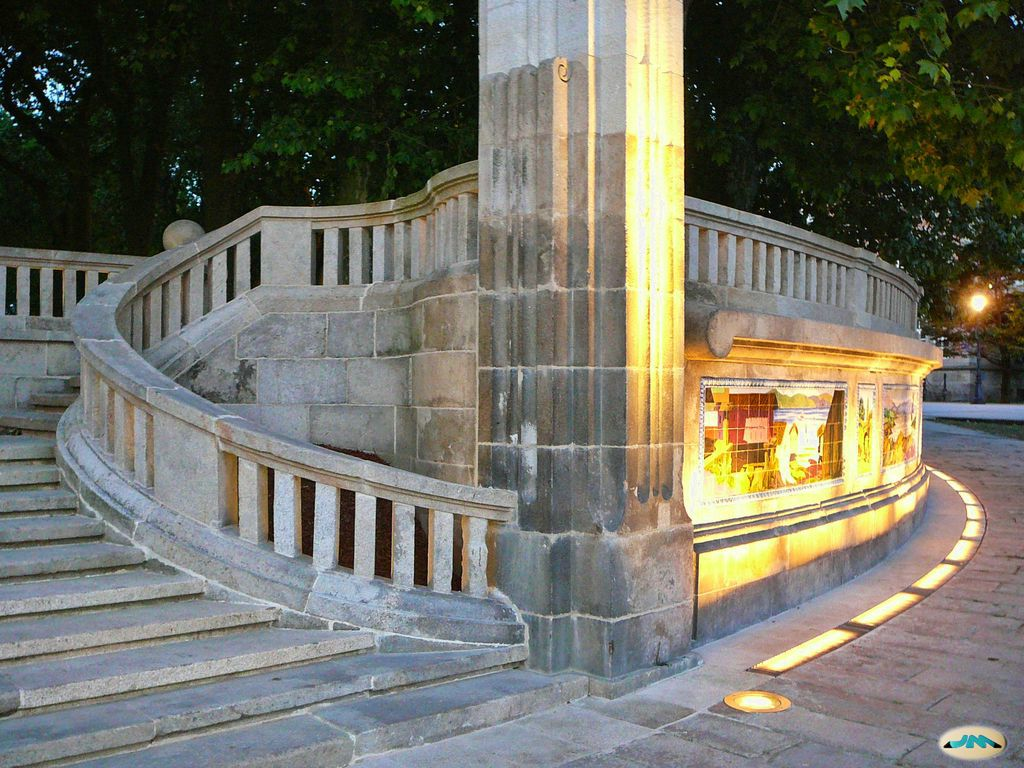

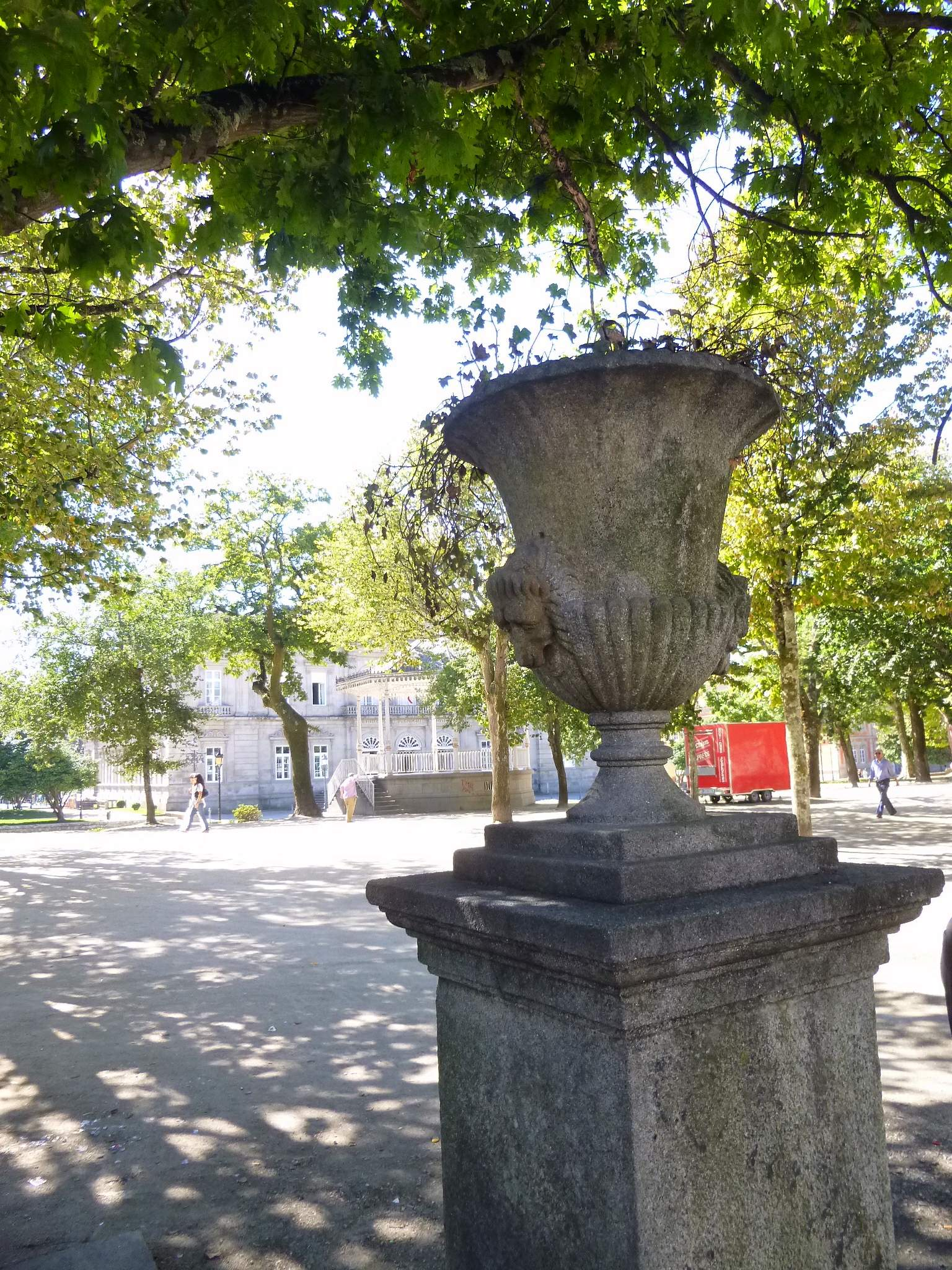

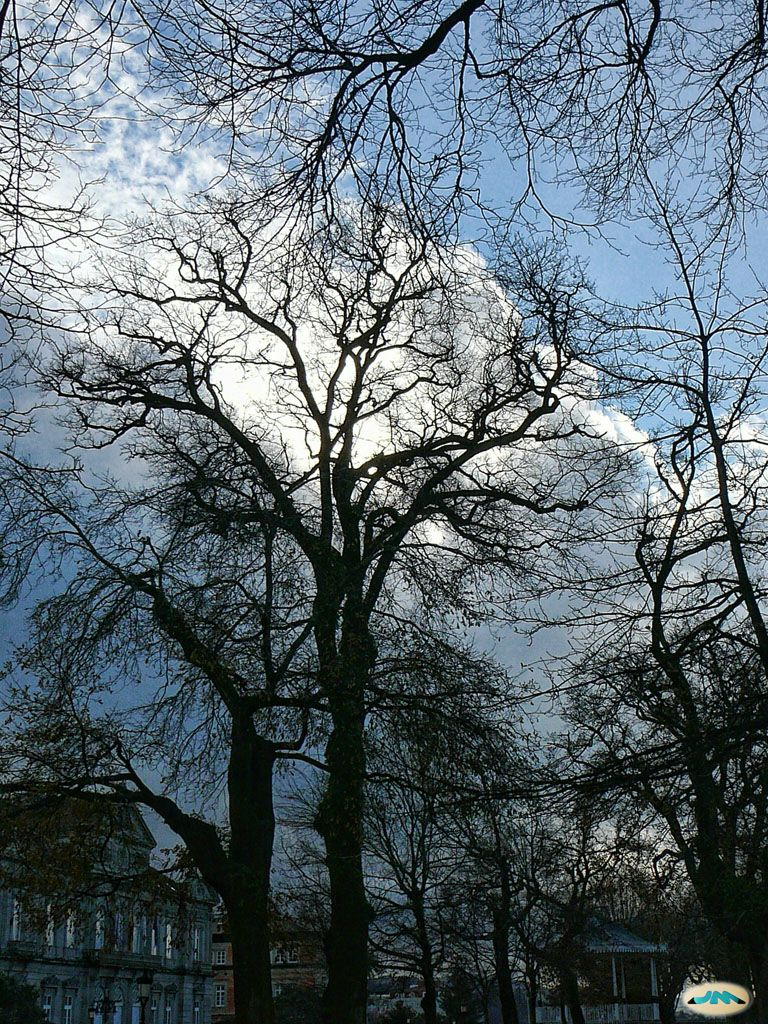

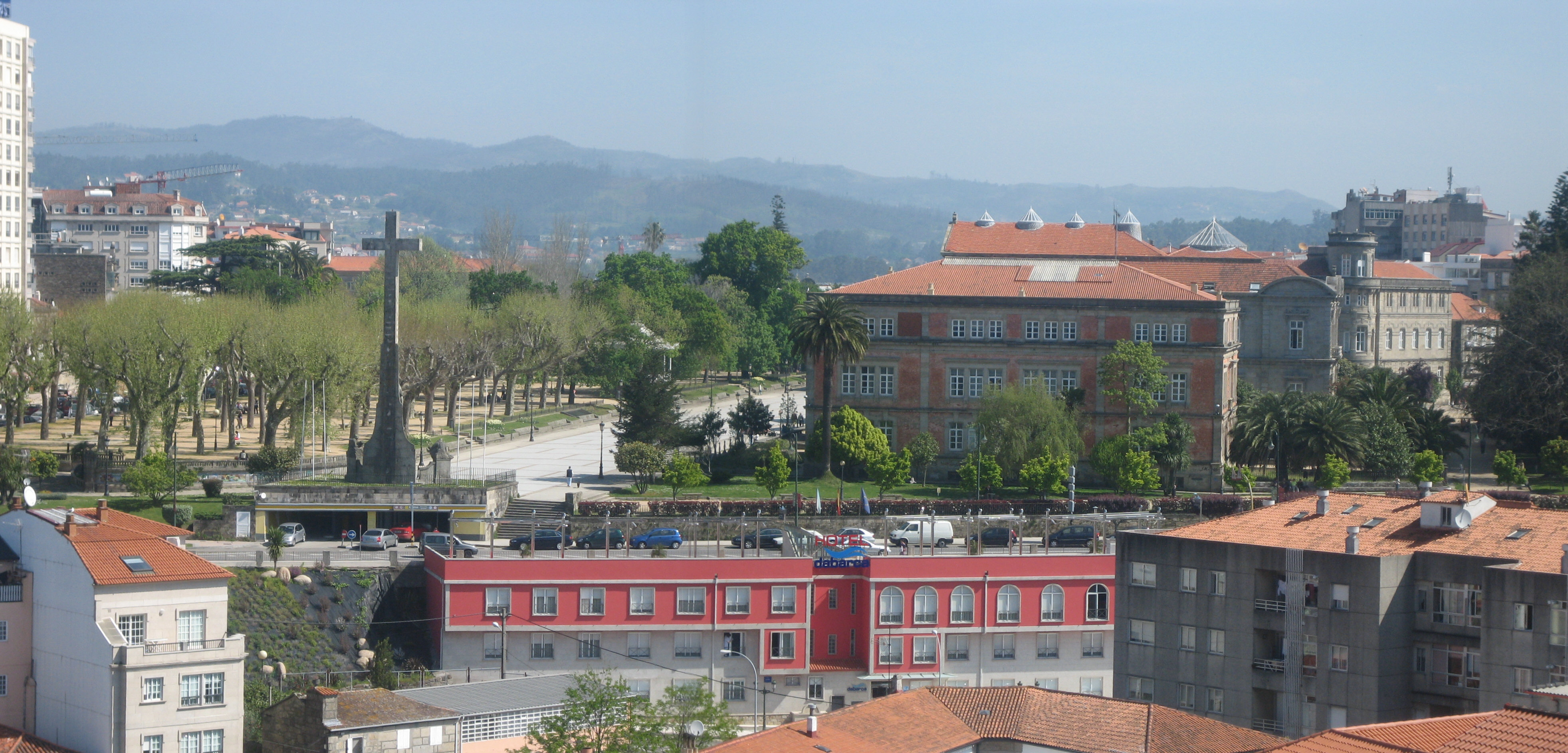

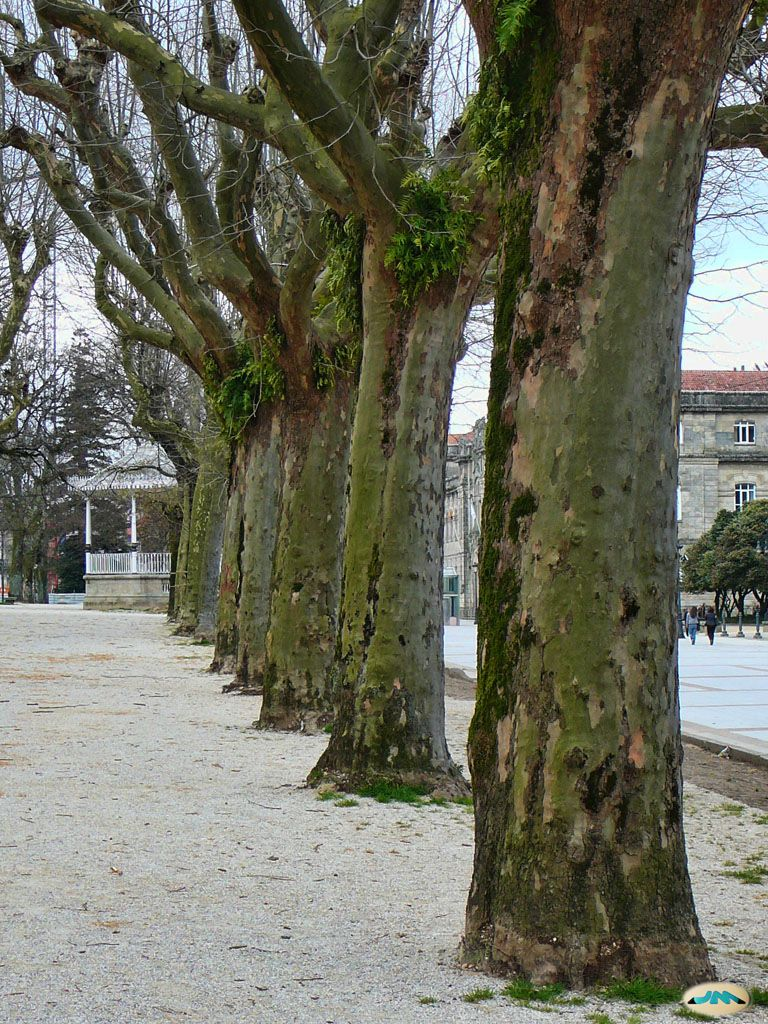

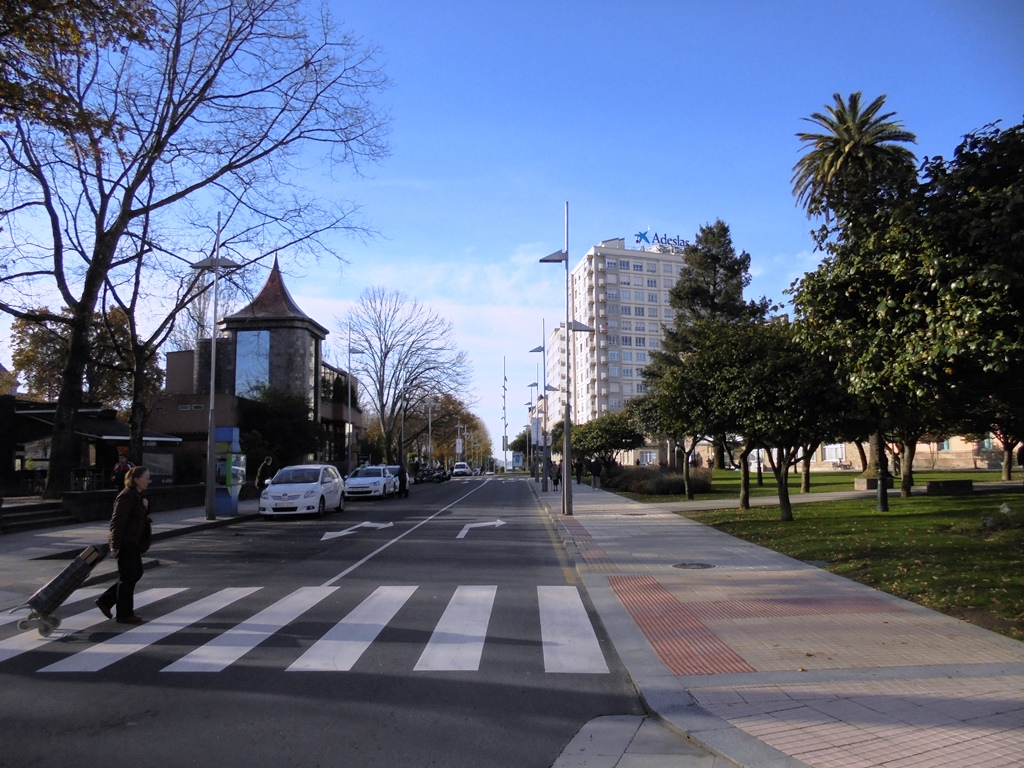

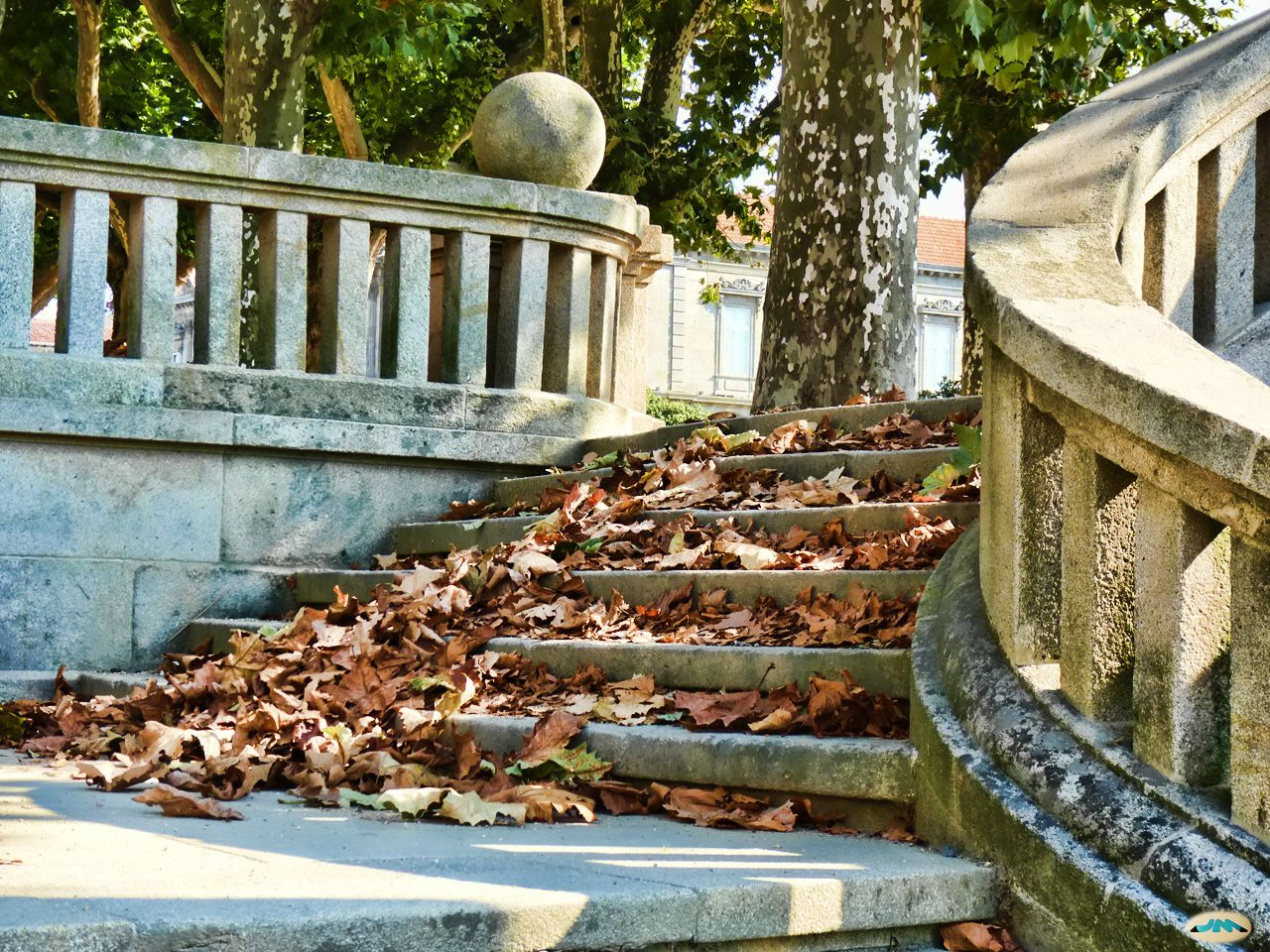

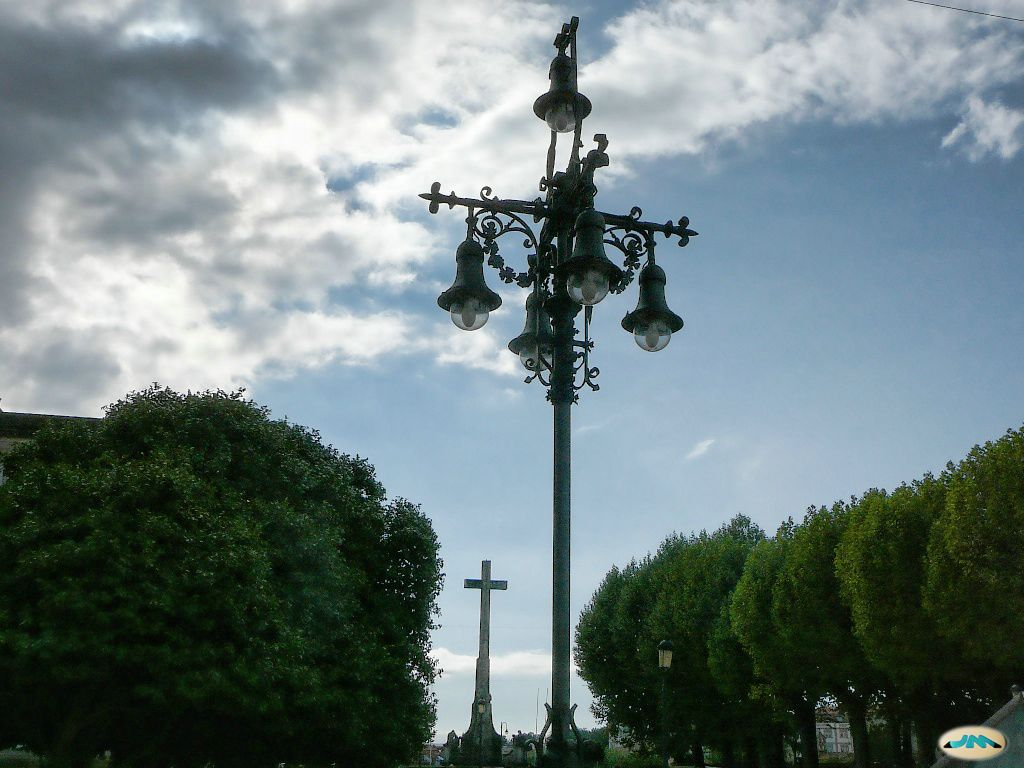

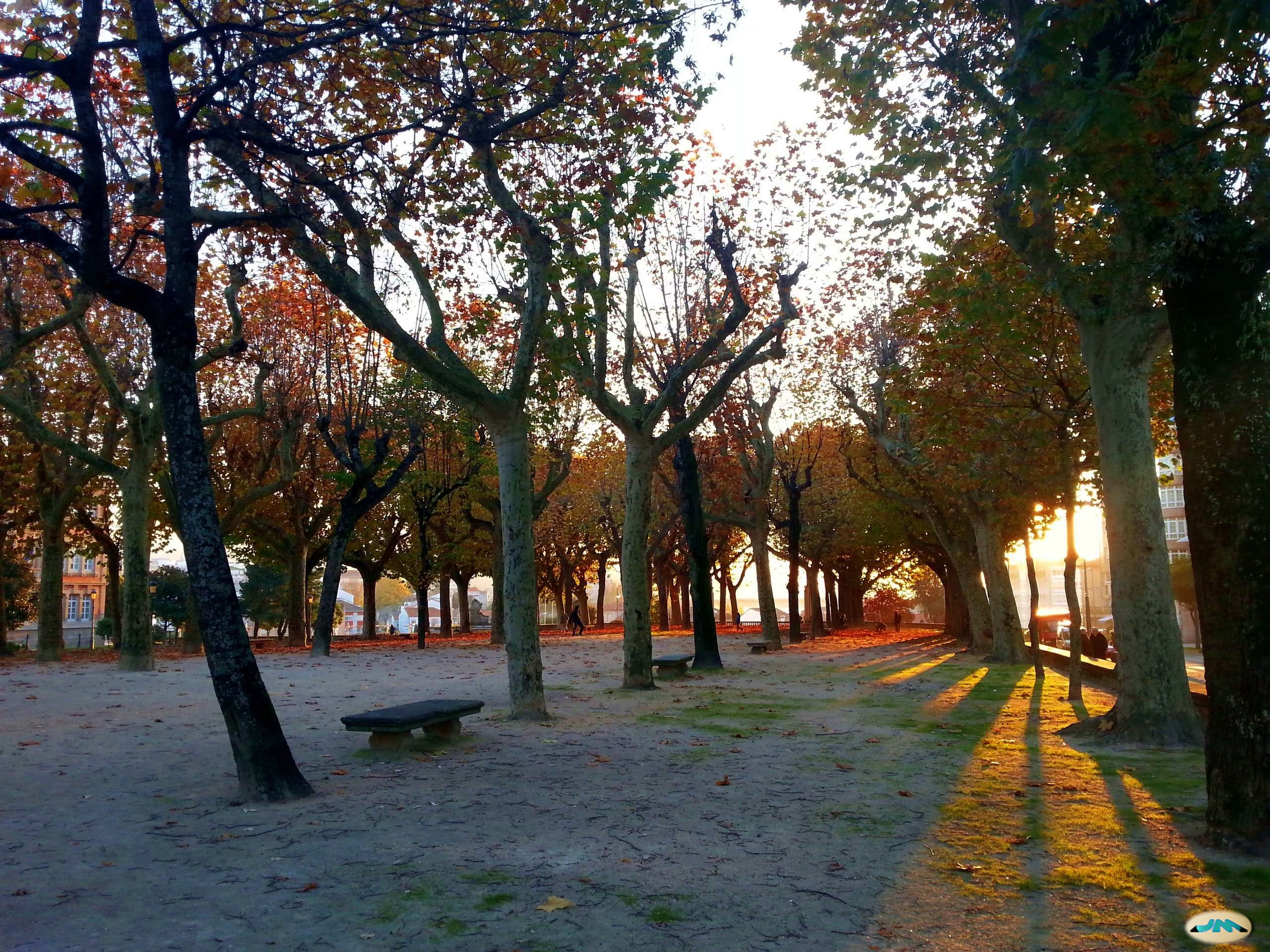

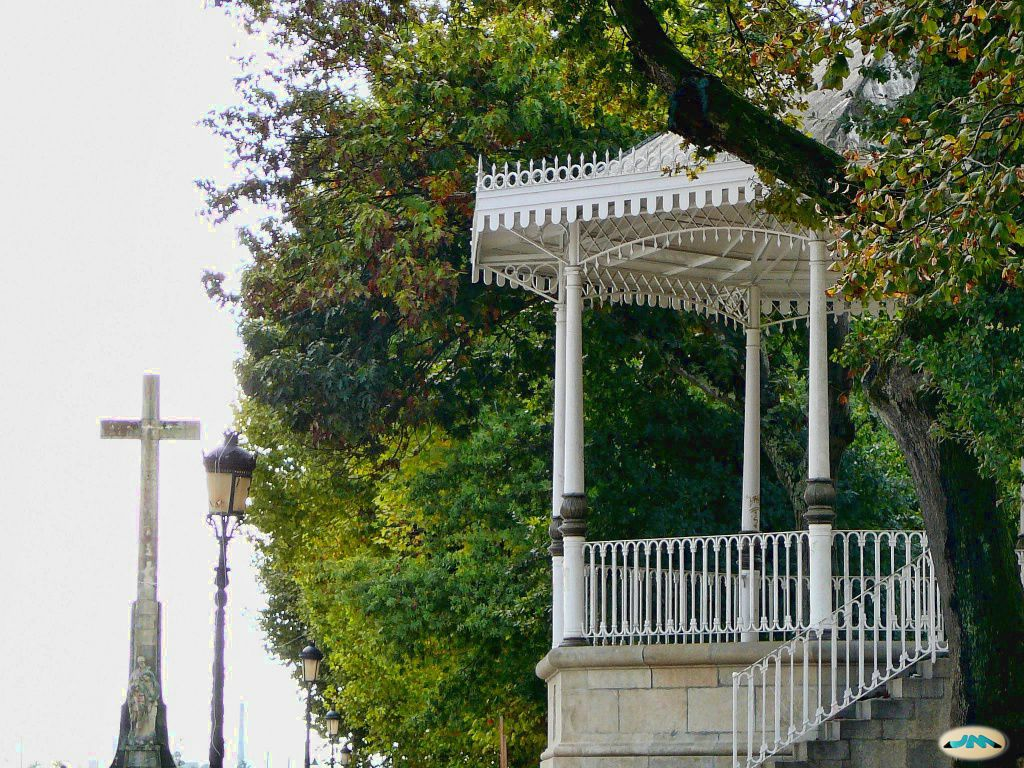

== See also ==
=== Bibliography ===
- Fortes Bouzán, Xosé (2011). Pontevedra. Burgo, villa, capital (in Spanish). Brión-A Coruña: Guiverny. p. 388. ISBN 978-84-939449-1-9.
- González Zúñiga, Claudio (1848). Descripción Geográfica, Estadística, Económica e Histórica de la Ciudad Capital de Pontevedra (in Spanish). Pontevedra: Establecimiento Tipográfico de la Viuda de Pintos. pp. 6–7.

=== Related articles ===
- Plaza de España (Pontevedra)
- Gran Vía de Montero Ríos
- Ensanche-City Centre
- Palm Trees Park
- Island of Sculptures

=== External links ===
- (es) Visit-Pontevedra. "Alameda de Pontevedra". Archived from the original on 26 June 2020.
