= USS Alameda =

USS Alameda has been the name of more than one United States Navy ship, and may refer to:

- USS Alameda (SP-1040), the proposed designation for a motorboat considered for naval use in 1917 but never acquired by the Navy
- USS Alameda (ID-1432), the proposed designation for a steamer considered for naval use during World War I but never acquired by the Navy
- USS Alameda (AO-10), originally designated Fuel Ship No. 10, a tanker in commission from 1919 to 1922
- USS Alameda (AP-68), the name and designation prospectively assigned to the smaller SS Monterey (the larger being the Matson liner) for use as a troop transport in 1942. Monterey was returned to the War Shipping Administration and then assigned to Army operation as USAT Monterey.

== See also ==
- USS Alameda County
