= Faculty of Design of Pontevedra =

Faculty in Pontevedra, Spain

Design Faculty of Pontevedra
- Facultad de Diseño de Pontevedra
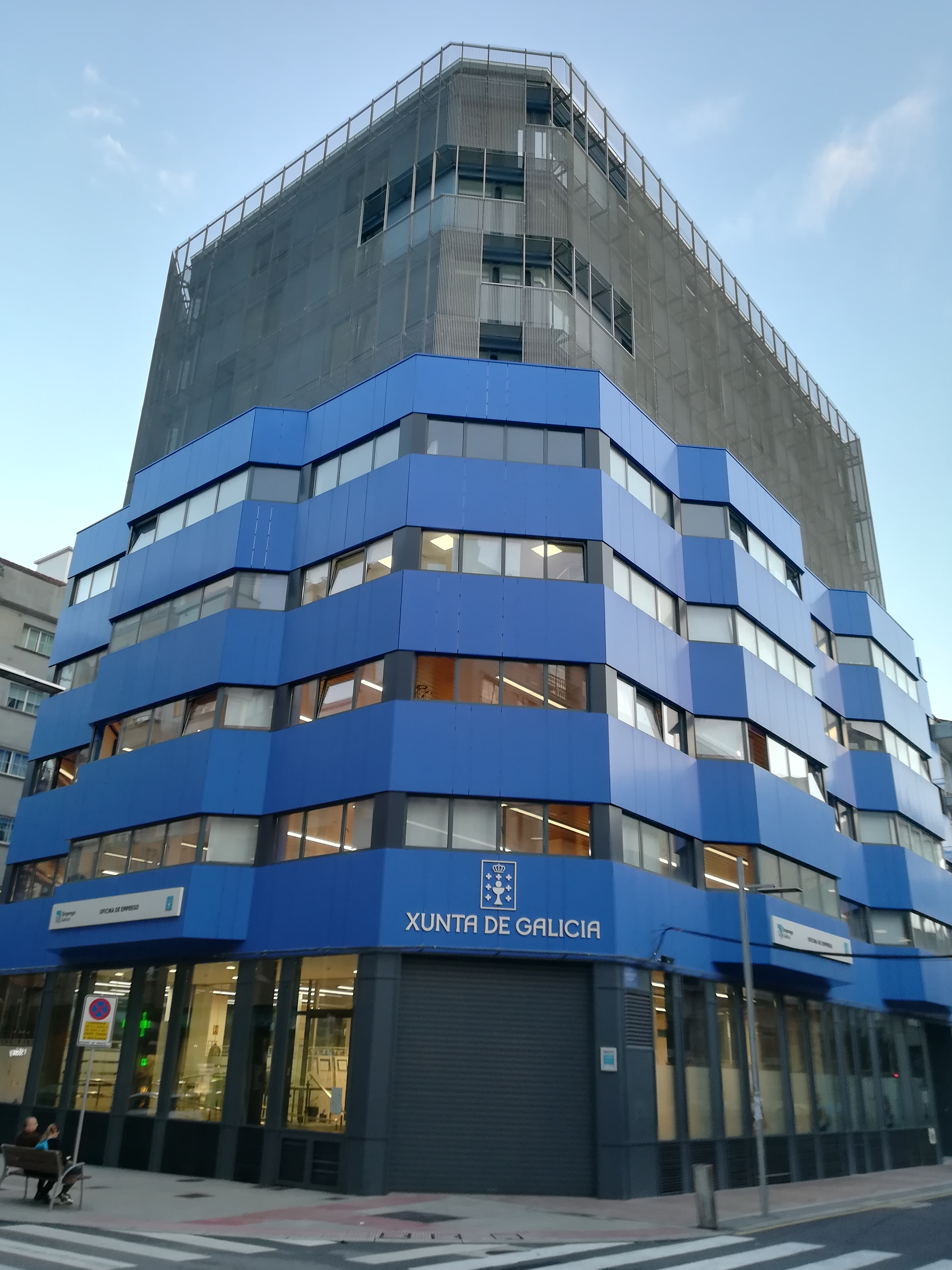
- Faculty façade
- Type: Public Faculty
- Established: 2022
- Parent institution: University of Vigo
- Affiliations: Pontevedra Campus
- Students: 260
- Location: Pontevedra, Spain; 42°25′47.6″N 8°38′20.8″W
- Campus: A Xunqueira campus

The Faculty of Design of Pontevedra is a university faculty founded in 2022 in the Spanish city of Pontevedra, located in the city centre, in Benito Corbal Street.

The faculty belongs to the Pontevedra Campus, integrated in the Galician University System and dependent on the University of Vigo. It offers undergraduate and graduate design studies. It is the only faculty of its kind in the northwest of Spain.

== History ==
The process of creating the design faculty in the city of Pontevedra was launched in October 2020.

The Faculty of Design of Pontevedra was created in 2022 by Decree 133/2022, of 7 July, in its article 1. According to the aforementioned decree, the faculty is able to accommodate, in addition to the design degree, other future degrees, both bachelor and master, related to the field of design. Although it was initially planned that classes would start at the Faculty in 2022 with the launch of the Bachelor of Design degree, this was finally postponed due to delays in the administrative procedures and will finally start in September 2023.

The initial provisional headquarters of the Faculty of Design will be located on the floors of the Xunta de Galicia building given over for university purposes in the centre of the city of Pontevedra, at Benito Corbal Street 47. It is planned to construct a specific building that will house the definitive headquarters of the faculty in the Tafisa area, on the left bank of the Lérez river, on the opposite bank to where the A Xunqueira campus is located. Until the construction of the new building in the Tafisa neighbourhood, teaching will take place in the building on Benito Corbal Street and in some of the shared spaces of the Faculty of Fine Arts such as the textile workshops.

== Programmes ==
The Faculty of Design in Pontevedra offers Bachelor's and master's degree courses in the fields of design and creation.

- Bachelor of Design (4 years). This is a unique degree in the Galician university system. Two orientations are proposed, one in graphic and digital design and the other in fashion design, offering a transversal training based on areas of knowledge related to fine arts and the fields of audiovisual communication, computer science, art history, design, sociology or special didactics.
- Master in Fashion Design and Creative Management. The Master is currently offered at the Faculty of Fine Arts of Pontevedra and will be attached to the Faculty of Design from the academic year 2023-2024.

== Activities ==
In the city, design-related activities are also organised in other faculties of the Pontevedra University Campus, such as those related to the National Design Meeting in October 2022.

== See also ==
=== Related articles ===
- Faculty of Fine Arts of Pontevedra
- Faculty of Communication of Pontevedra

=== External links ===
- Faculty of Design of Pontevedra website
- Master in Fashion design in Pontevedra
- Report for the request for verification of official diplomas : Bachelor of Design
