= Pontevedra Campus =

Campus in Pontevedra, Spain

- Campus de Pontevedra
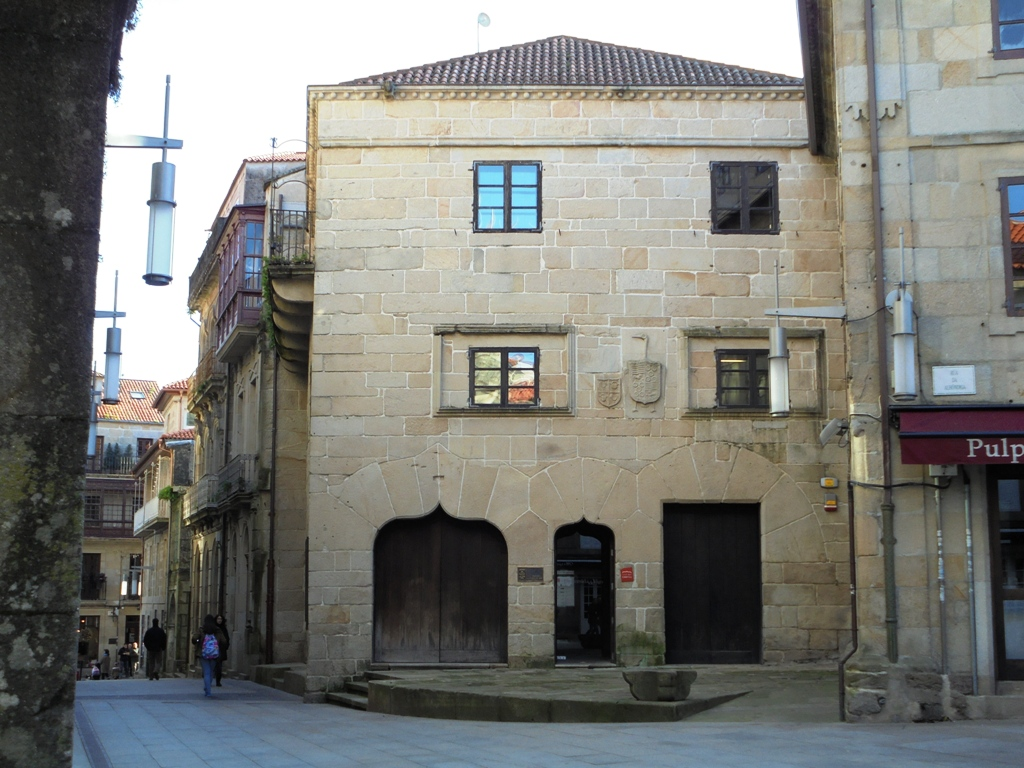
- Casa de las Campanas, Rectorate
- Type: Public University
- Established: 1990
- Affiliations: University of Vigo
- Rector: Marián Fernández Villarino
- Total staff: 421
- Students: 4215
- Location: Pontevedra, Province of Pontevedra, Galicia, Spain; 42°26′23.5″N 8°38′18.0″W
- Campus: A Xunqueira, City centre

The Pontevedra campus is one of three campuses that host the University of Vigo. It is located in the Spanish city of Pontevedra and offers undergraduate, postgraduate and doctoral studies in Social sciences, health sciences, arts, engineering and Sports.

== History ==
The Pontevedra Campus has its origins in the Normal school located in the city, which since the 19th century has been the Normal school of the province of Pontevedra and the Nursing school dependent on the Provincial Council of Pontevedra (Diputación Provincial de Pontevedra). The Normal school of Pontevedra, the origin of the current Faculty of Education (created in 1999), was created in 1845 and the School of ATS (Ayudante Técnico Sanitario), the origin of the current School of Nursing, was created in 1974. These two schools have offered for many years the university studies par excellence of the city of Pontevedra, in addition to the UNED Regional Centre in the province of Pontevedra, located in the Monte Porreiro district of the city, where a wide range of university studies can be followed (Different engineering studies, History, Mathematics, Law, Physics, Chemistry, Psychology, Foreign Languages, Sociology, Economics, Commerce, Pedagogy, etc.). The UNED Associated Centre of Pontevedra was created in January 1973 and started operating in March 1973 and was the first regional centre in Spain located outside Madrid, together with the one in Las Palmas de Gran Canaria.

With the division of the University of Santiago de Compostela into three universities, the Pontevedra Campus was created in 1990 and new faculties were established in the city. The offer of university studies in Pontevedra has been extended with new degrees and courses.

The first faculty that started on the Pontevedra campus in 1990 was the Faculty of Fine Arts. In 1991, a second engineering school joined it, the School of Forestry Engineering.

In 1993, the Faculty of Social Sciences and Communication was created, starting with a first degree in Advertising and Public relations in 1994 and in 1995, the Faculty of Physiotherapy began to operate. In 1999, management and public administration studies were introduced in the Faculty of Social Sciences and sports science in the Faculty of Education and Sport. In 2003, the degree in audiovisual communication was introduced in the Faculty of Social Sciences and Communication. Later, in 2009, the University Centre of Defence was created, depending on the Campus of Pontevedra, in the Military Naval School of Marín, located in the urban area of Pontevedra, 6 kilometres from the city, where industrial engineering studies are offered.

On 7 July 2022 by decree 133/2022, two more faculties on the Pontevedra campus were created the Faculty of Design and the Faculty of Management and Public Administration.

In recent years, the Pontevedra campus has specialised in the field of creation, taking the name Campus CREA.

The Pontevedra campus was declared a Green Campus on 18 November 2015, being the first in Spain to achieve this distinction.

The American coffee chain Starbucks has opened a space in the Faculty of Education and Sport in September 2019. That same month, the Xunta de Galicia granted the University the 5th, 6th and 7th floors of its administrative building at 47 Benito Corbal Street for 20 years to house the CREA Campus offices.

In the 2023-2024 academic year, the Pontevedra campus offer 30 degrees, including 12 bachelor's degrees, 12 master's degrees and 5 doctorates. From 2000 to 2022 the number of students on campus has increased by 20%.

== Description ==
=== Organization ===
The Pontevedra campus is located in the area of A Xunqueira, in the north of the city and in the city centre. From an urban point of view, the A Xunqueira campus has a central roundabout and several streets with multiple parking spaces, including those for students.

There are a total of five faculties on this campus: the Faculty of Communication, the Faculty of Physiotherapy, the Faculty of Education and Sport, the School of Forest Engineers and the Faculty of Management and Public Administration.

The central campus library is located on the first floor of the Faculty of Social Sciences and Communication, and the administrative services of the campus and the documentation delivery and collection centre (LERD) of the Galician university system are located in the School of Forest Engineering.

In the city centre there is the Faculty of Fine Arts, located next to the Plaza de España in the neoclassical early 20th century building of the former Saint Ferdinand Barracks, and the School of Nursing, located in the Provincial Hospital of Pontevedra. The rectorate and the campus administration are also located in the city centre, in the Casa de las Campanas.

The CREA Campus offices are located on the 5th, 6th and 7th floors of the Xunta de Galicia's administrative building at 47 Benito Corbal Street.

Every year, the Pontevedra campus welcomes Erasmus students from universities in other countries, whose numbers have increased in recent years. To facilitate their stay in the city, the Erasmus Student Network has a branch located in dedicated premises at the engineering school.

=== Institutions ===
The university institutions present in Pontevedra are the following:

==== Old town ====
- The headquarters of the Vice-Rectorate of the campus in the House of the Bells, in the old town centre. The owner of this historic building is the municipality of Pontevedra, which has temporarily ceded part of its building to the university.

==== A Xunqueira campus ====
- Institutions located on the A Xunqueira campus, in the northern part of the city, across the Lérez River and close to the Island of Sculptures park:
  - Faculty of Communication
  - Faculty of Management and Public Administration
  - Faculty of Education and Sport Sciences
  - Faculty of Physiotherapy
  - School of Forest Engineering

==== City centre ====
- Institutions located in the city centre:
  - Faculty of Fine Arts. The building is owned by the municipality of Pontevedra, which has temporarily ceded it to the university.
  - Faculty of Design
  - School of Nursing

==== Marín ====
- School attached to the Pontevedra Campus in Marín:
  - University Centre of Defence, in the Spanish Naval Academy.

The city is also home to the Higher School for the Conservation and Restoration of Cultural Property in Galicia.

In 2023, the Pontevedra campus had 4,215 Students enrolled. In the 2023–2024 academic year, it was the campus with the highest occupancy rate in the University of Vigo in the first year of study, with 107%.

The university degrees on campus with the highest employment rate are Physiotherapy (93%) and Advertising and Public relations (86.6%).

=== Infrastructures ===
The university campus has a kindergarten at its northern end, which is mainly dedicated to the children of the staff of the A Xunqueira school zone and is integrated into the network of Kindergartens of the Xunta de Galicia A galiña azul (The Blue Hen). On the other hand, the Pontevedra hospital complex became in 2012 the University Hospital Complex of Pontevedra (CHU), where medical students from the Faculty of Santiago de Compostela can carry out their final years of study.

The university has university cafeterias at the Faculty of Communication and the School of Forestry Engineering on the A Xunqueira campus and at the Faculty of Fine Arts in the city centre.

The university has a Sports Pavilion in Cruz Vermella Street for the university community with cardiofitness, cross-training, pilates, indoor cycling or sports on the sports track. There is also a calisthenics park next to the Faculty of Physiotherapy and a jetty on the north bank of the Lérez River.

The Pontevedra-Universidad railway station has been serving the campus since 2001 for students who wish to reach it by train. In addition, the Pontevedrian city bus line 1 has a stop in Alexandre Bóveda Street to also serve the Pontevedra campus. There is a bike path and parking spaces on the campus and also along Celso Emilio Ferreiro Street.

=== Green areas ===
The campus has green areas around the university buildings and a larger elongated green area to the south of the Faculty of Social Sciences and Communication, parallel to Celso Emilio Ferreiro Street. However, the large green area for the enjoyment of students and professors on campus is the adjoining Island of Sculptures park, with 7 hectares of land. The Faculty of Fine Arts in the city centre also has a green area in front of its main façade, the so-called Marescot Gardens, where there is a monument-fountain to Dr. Marescot.

== Traditions and culture ==
At the end of April, the main festival on the Pontevedra campus, Santa Catabirra, is dedicated to the patron saint of the Faculty of Social Sciences and Communication, Saint Catherine of Siena. Thousands of young people from all over Galicia participate in this festival. The celebrations of Saint Ero, patron saint of the Faculty of Fine Arts, are also of some importance.

The patrons of other faculties are St. Leander (school of Forestry Engineering), St. Isidore of Seville (Faculty of Education sciences) and St. Achillius (Faculty of Physiotherapy).

== Gallery ==
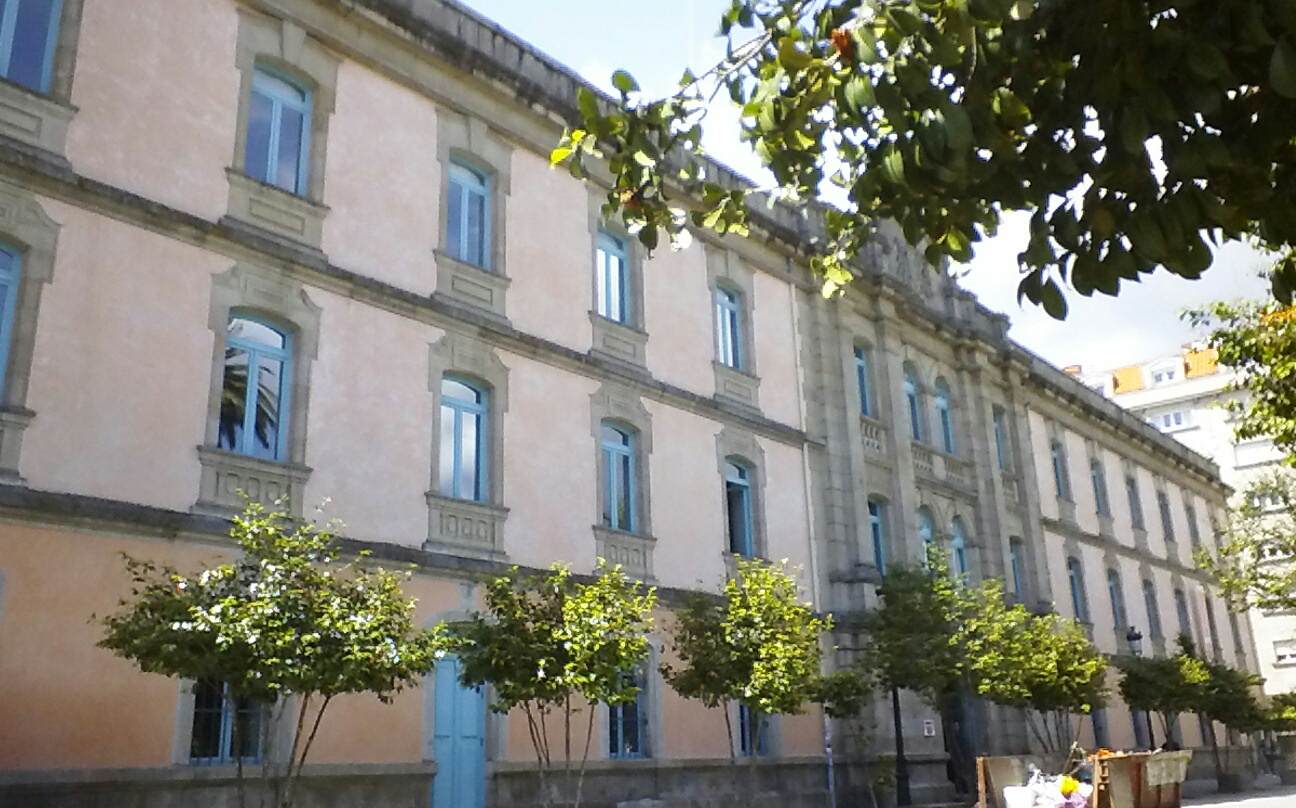
Faculty of Fine Arts

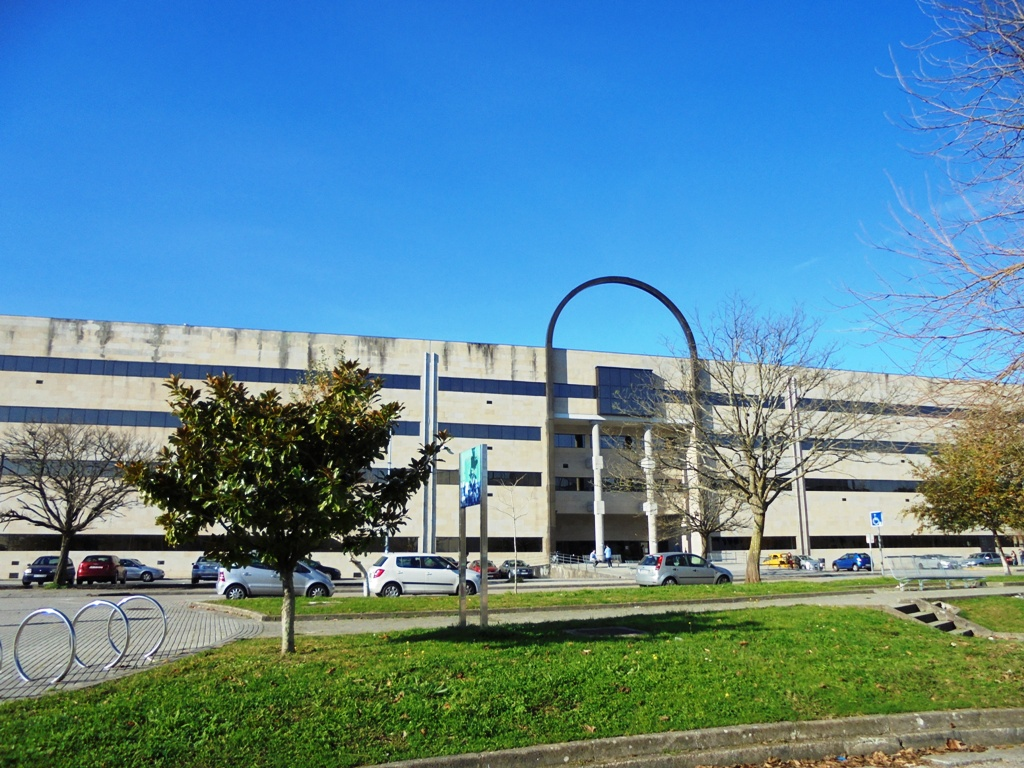
Faculty of Social Sciences and Communication

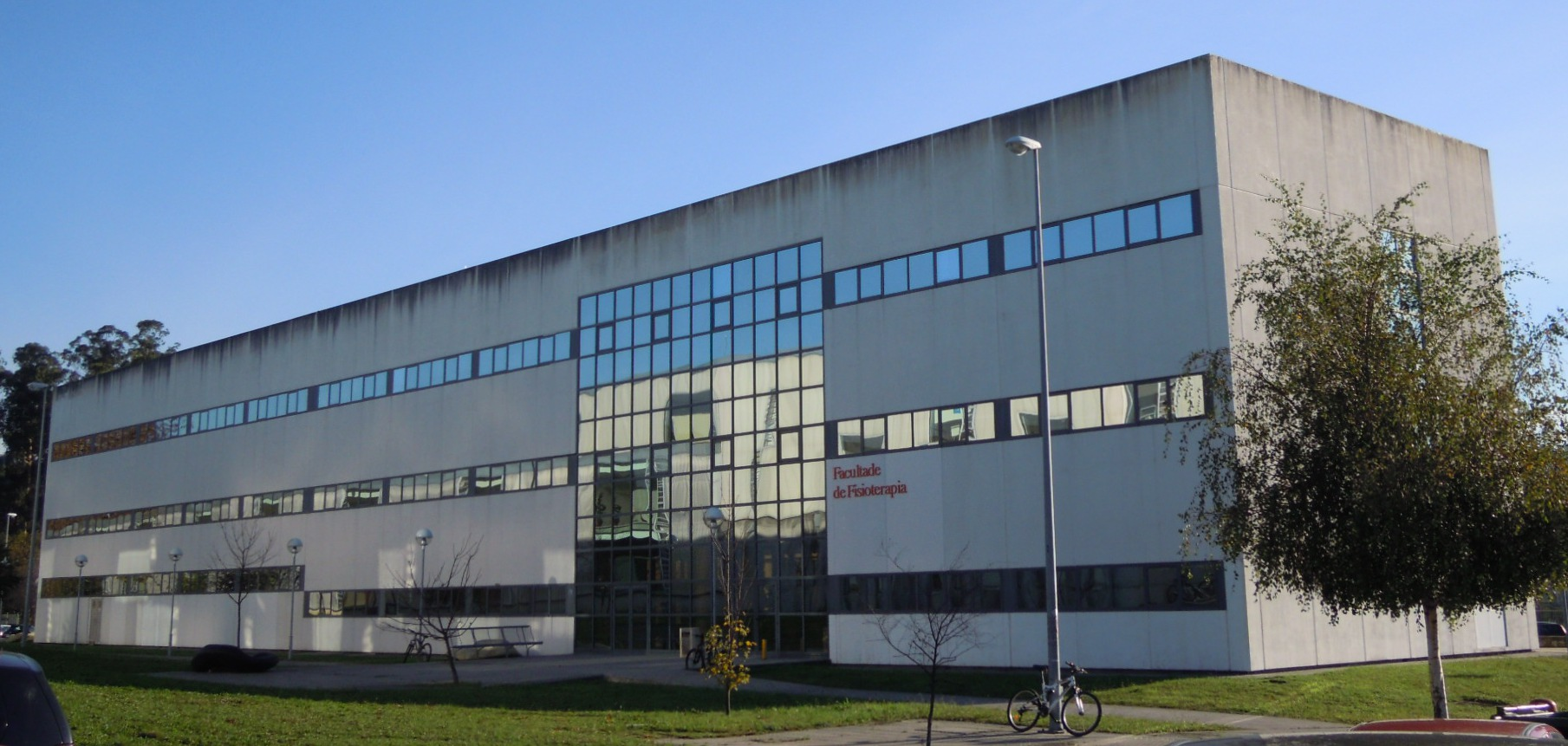
Faculty of Physiotherapy

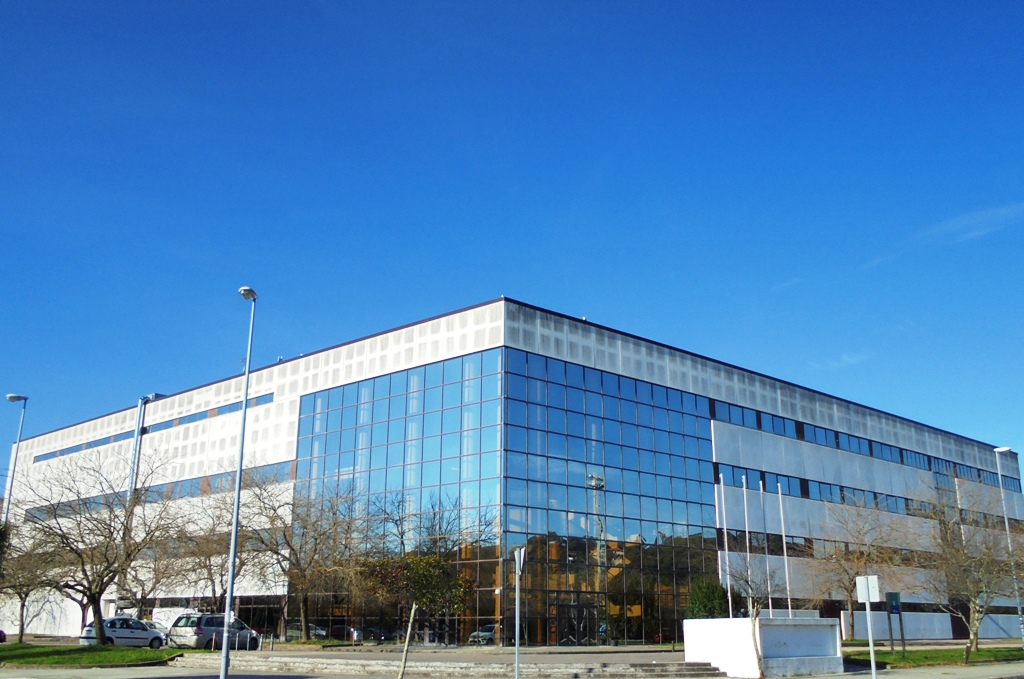
School of Forestry Engineering

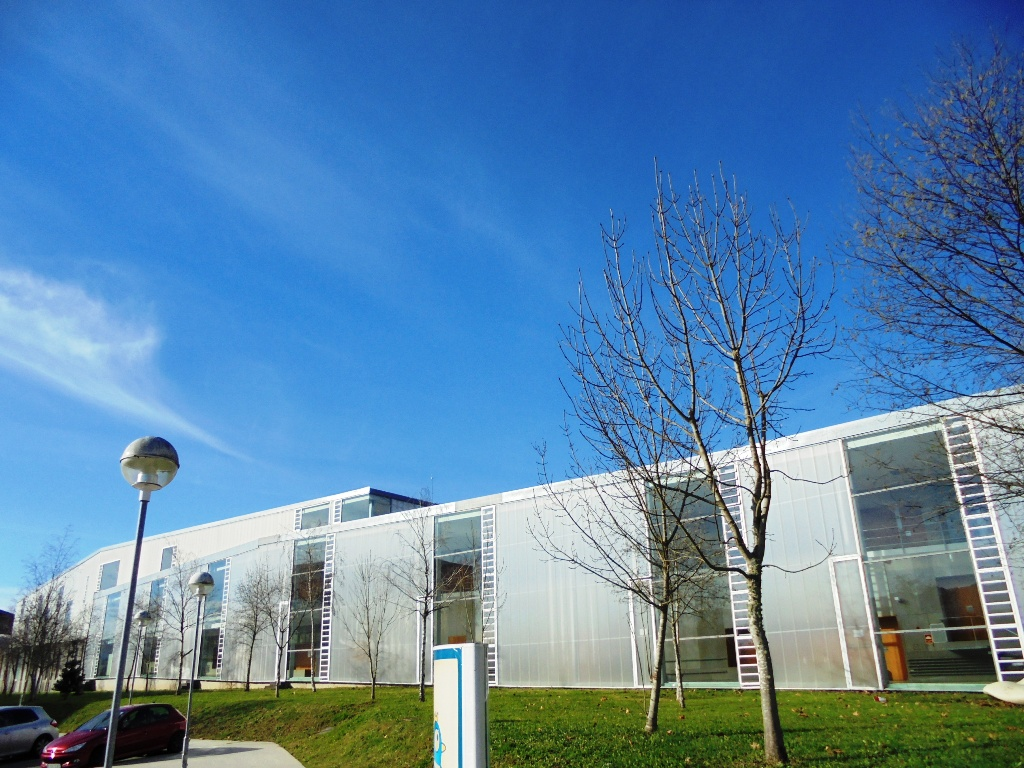
Faculty of Education and Sport Sciences

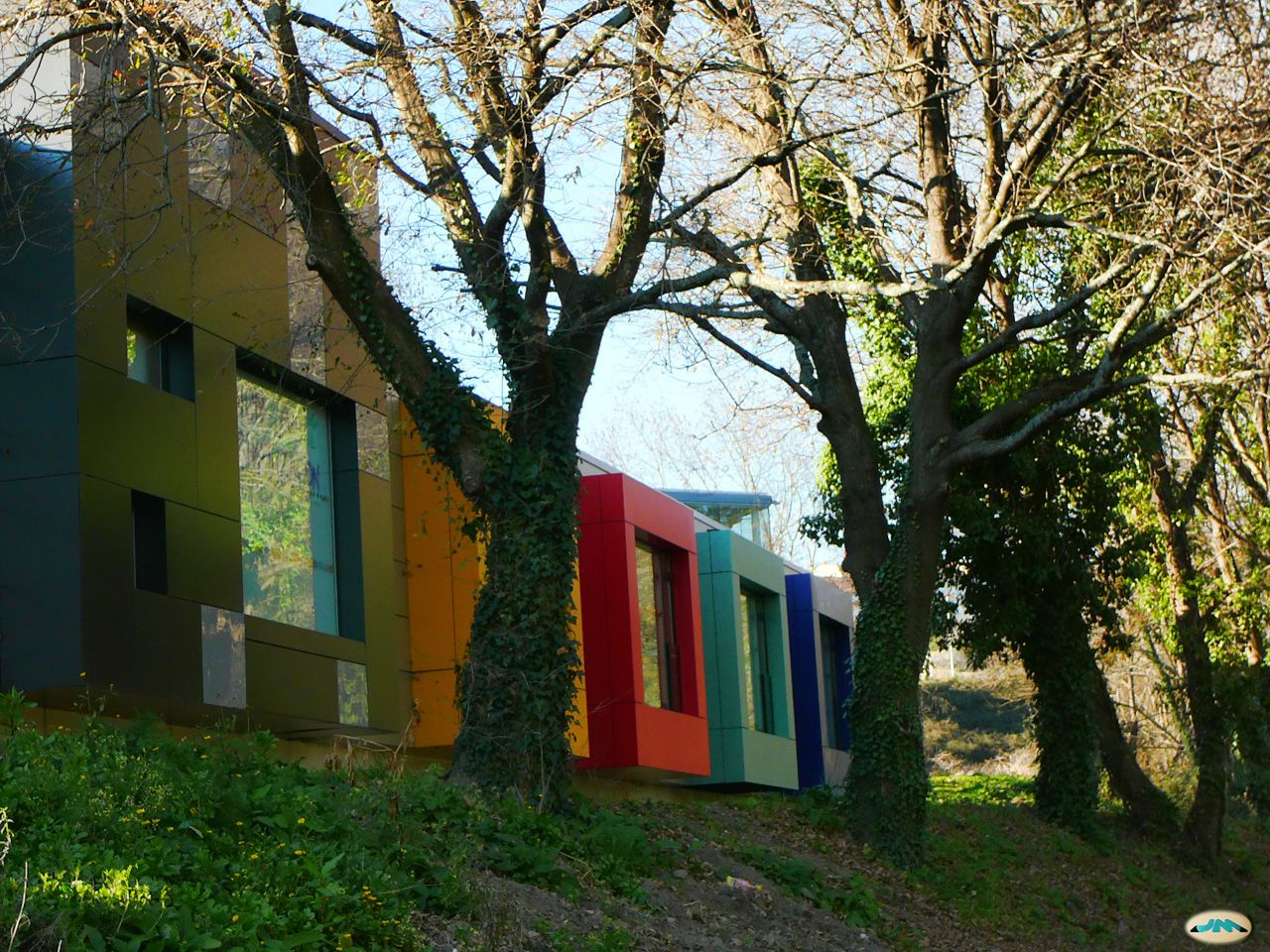
Campus crèche

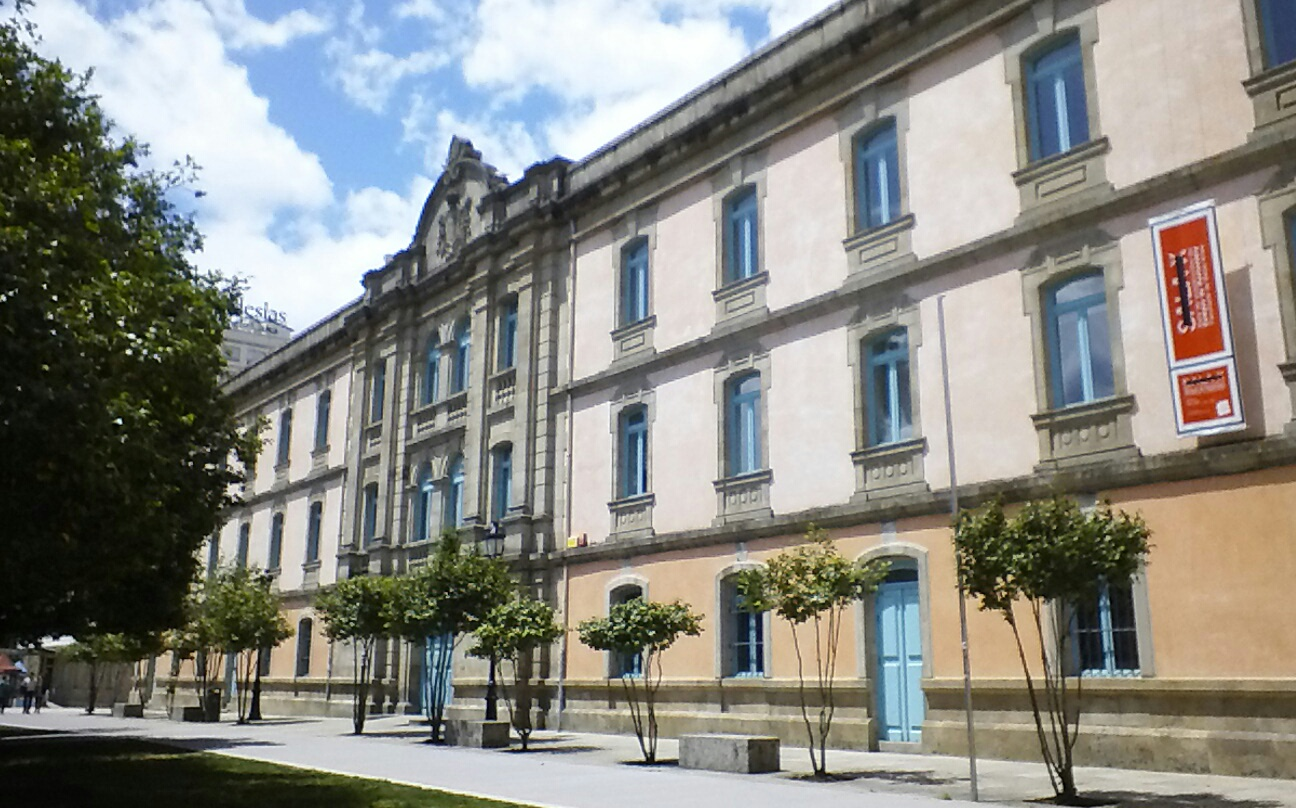
Faculty of Fine Arts

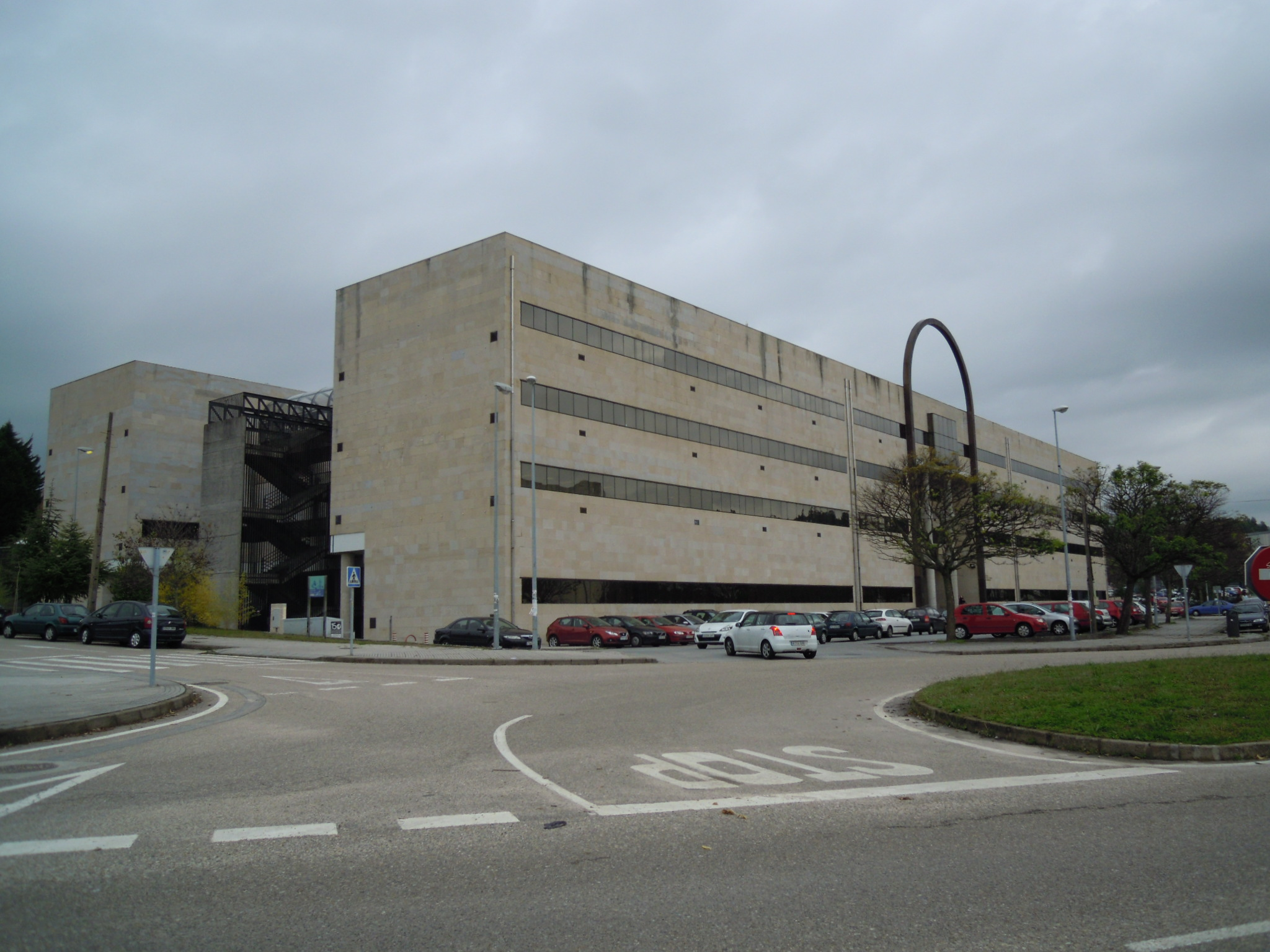
Faculty of Social Sciences and Communication

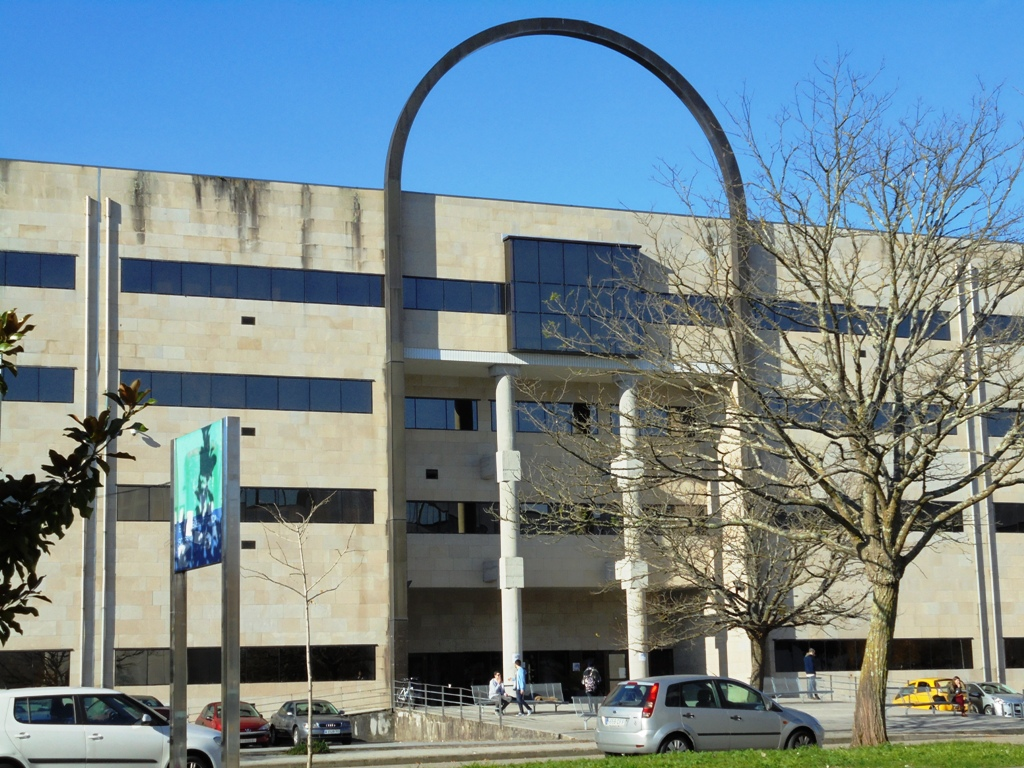
Entrance to the Faculty of Social Sciences and Communication

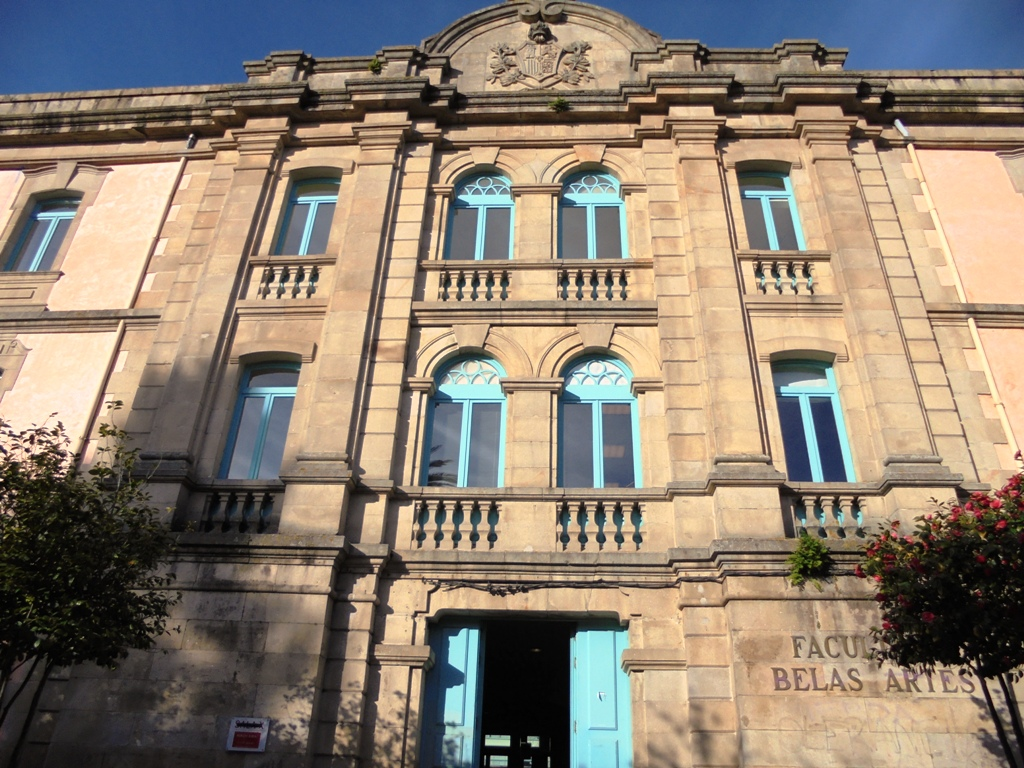
Entrance to the Faculty of Fine Arts

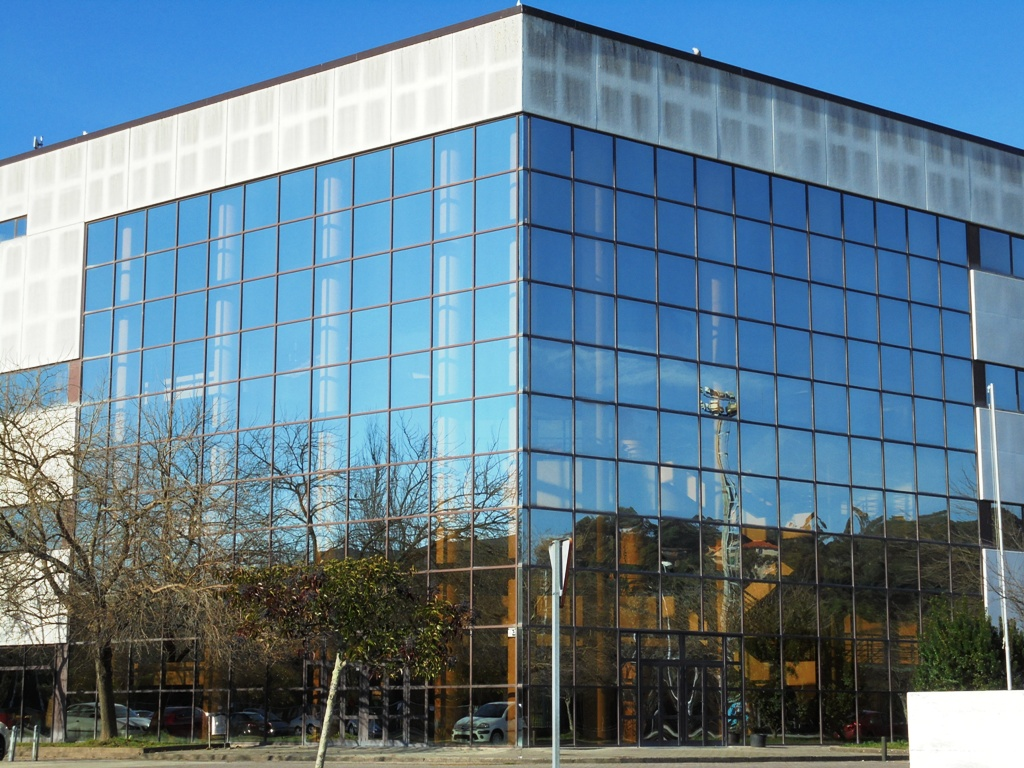
School of Forestry Engineering

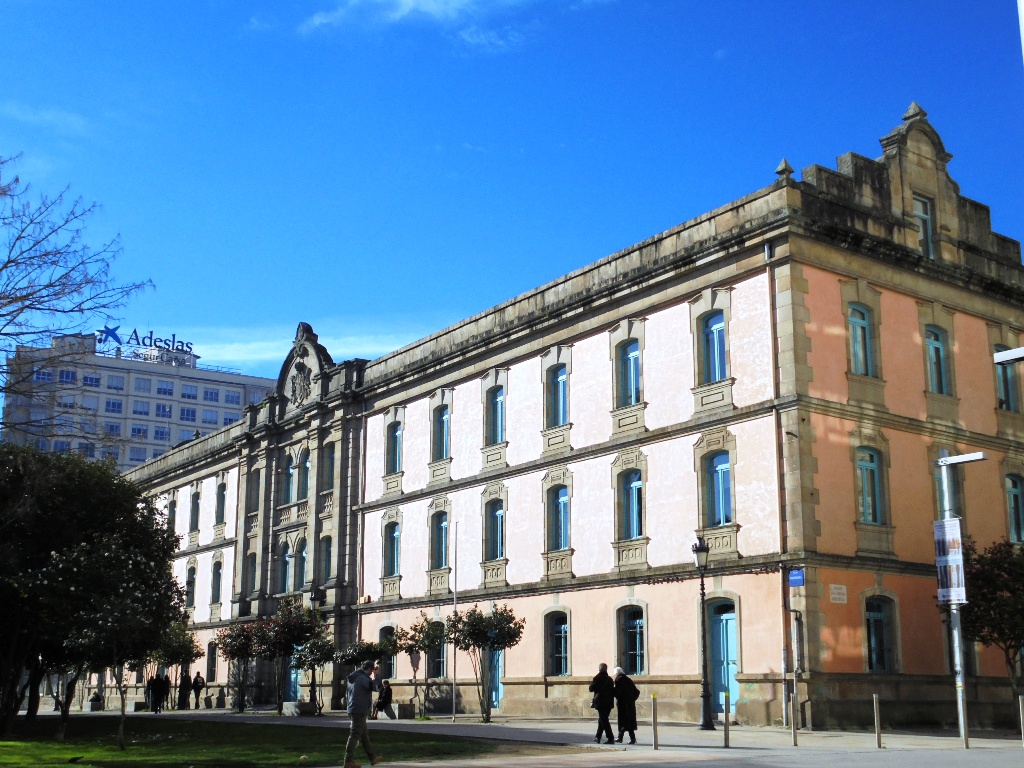
Faculty of Fine Arts

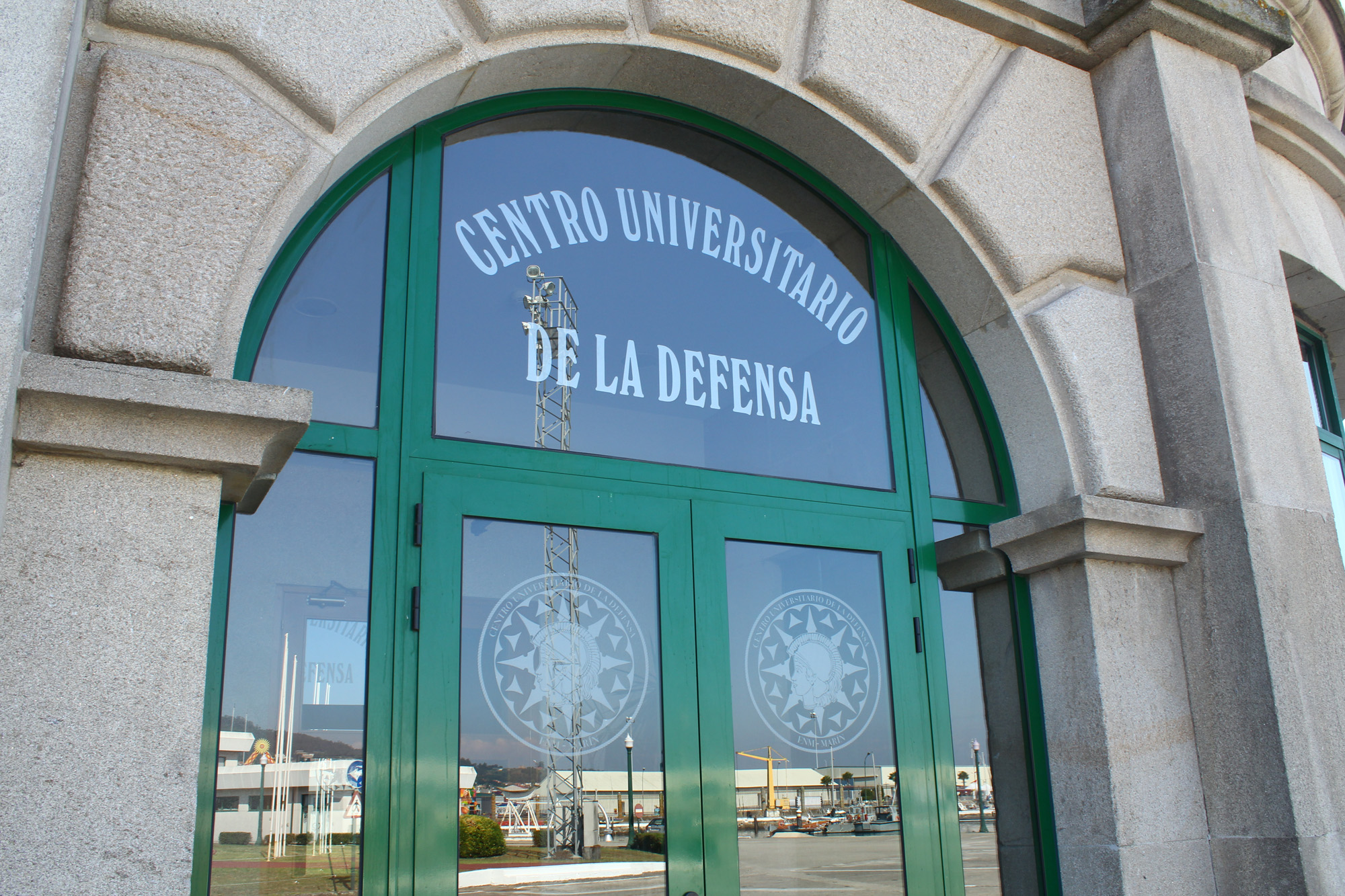
University Centre of Defence

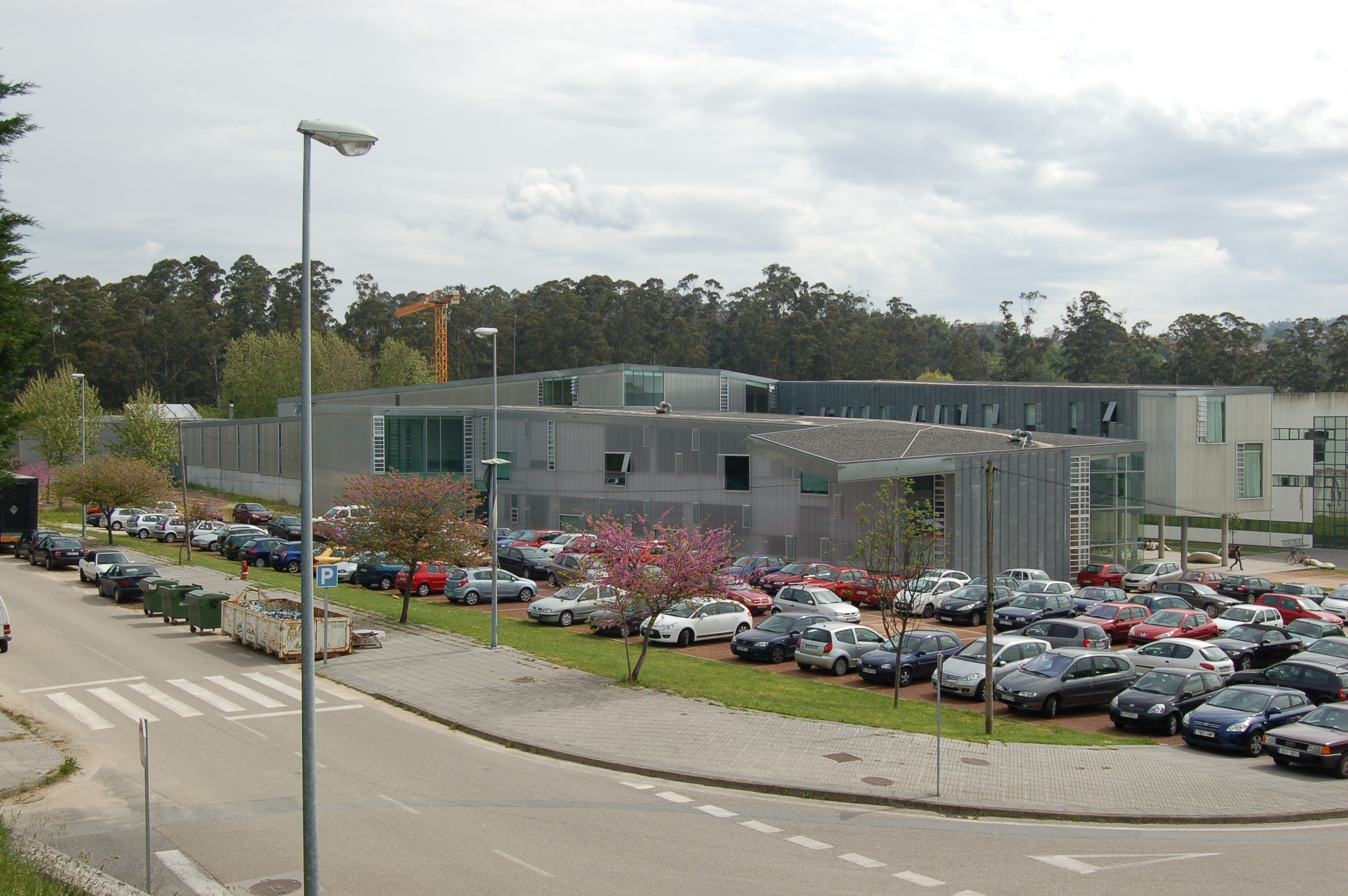
Faculty of Education and Sport Sciences

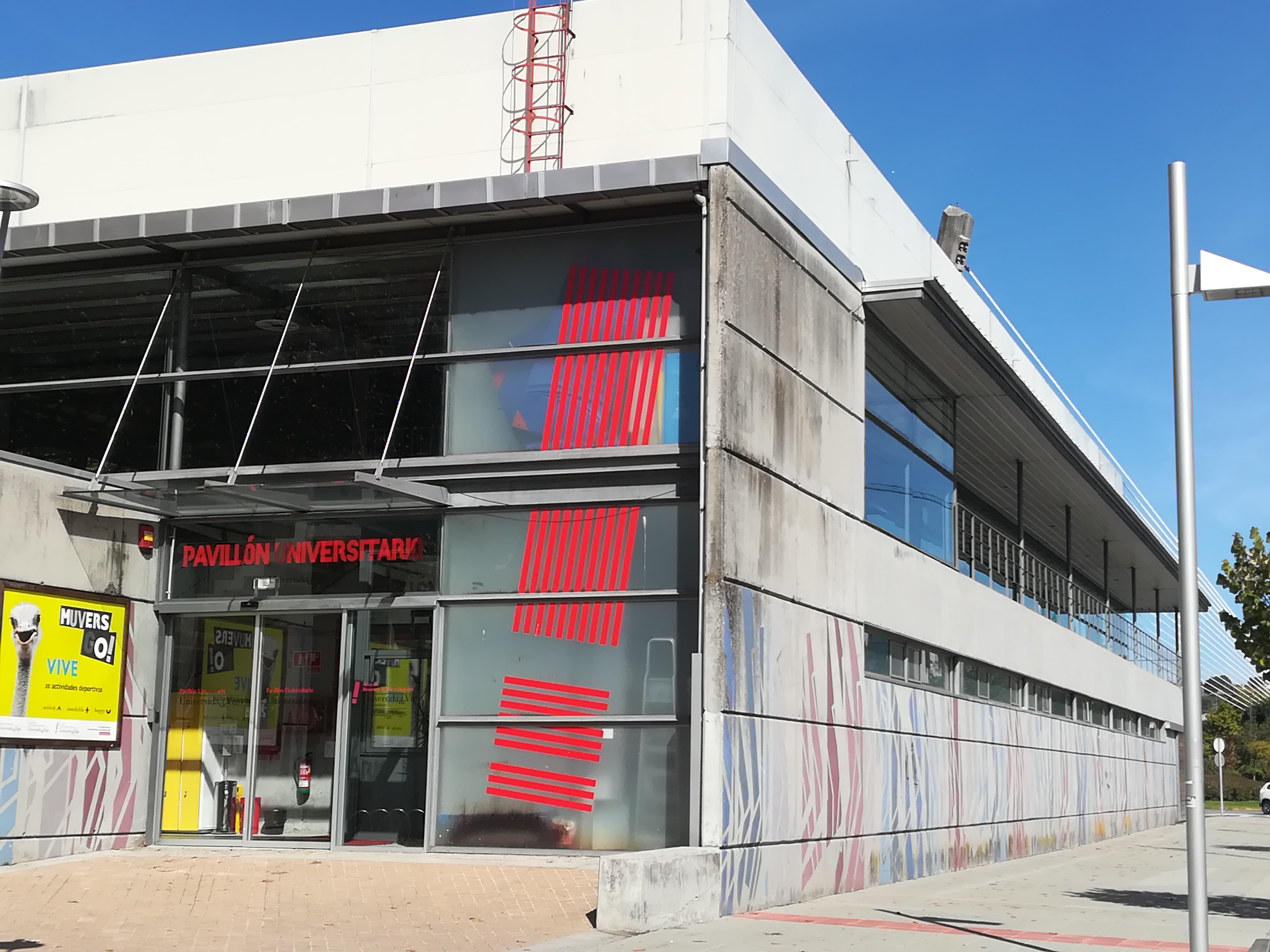
University Sports Pavilion

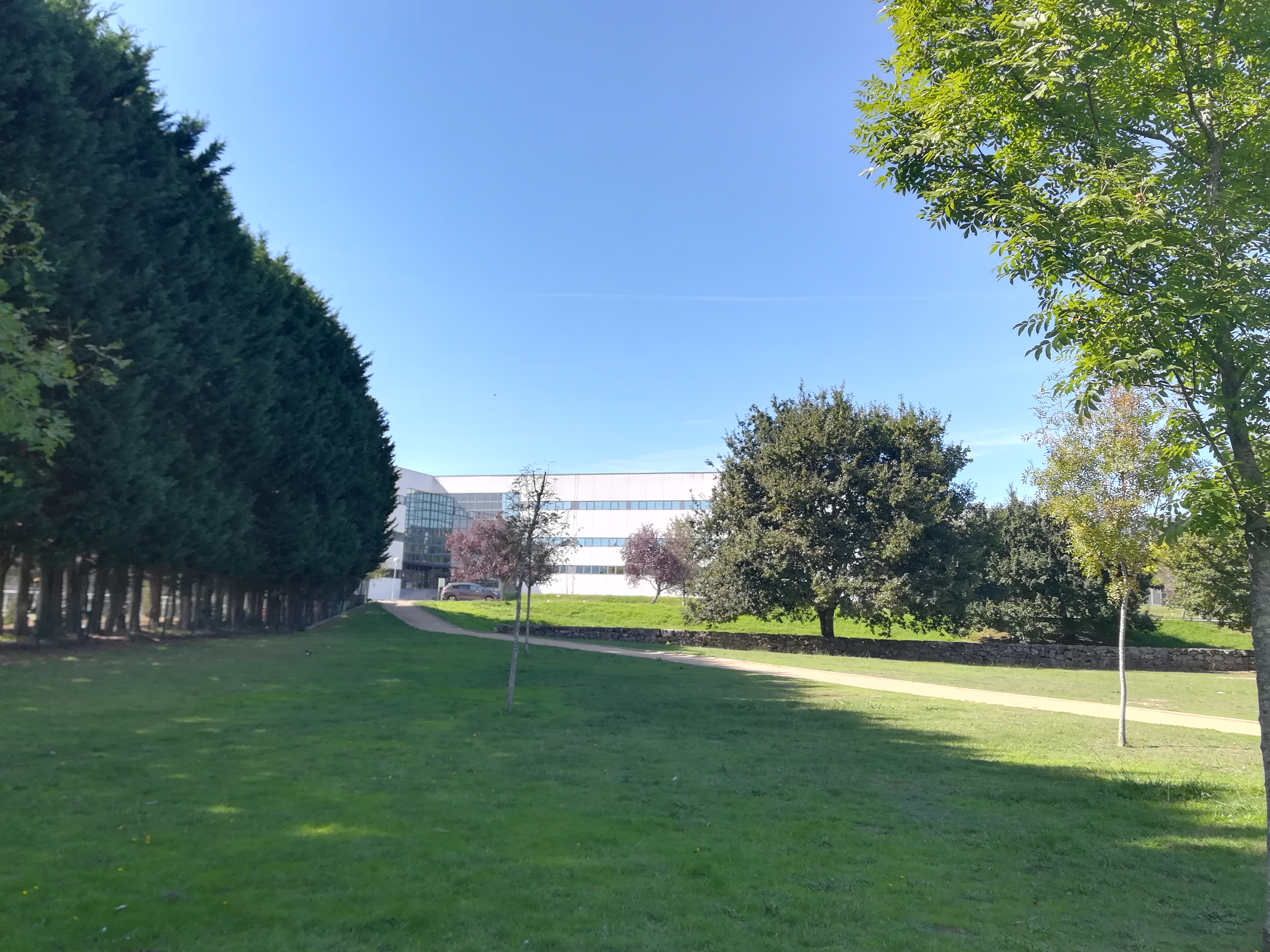
Faculty of Physiotherapy

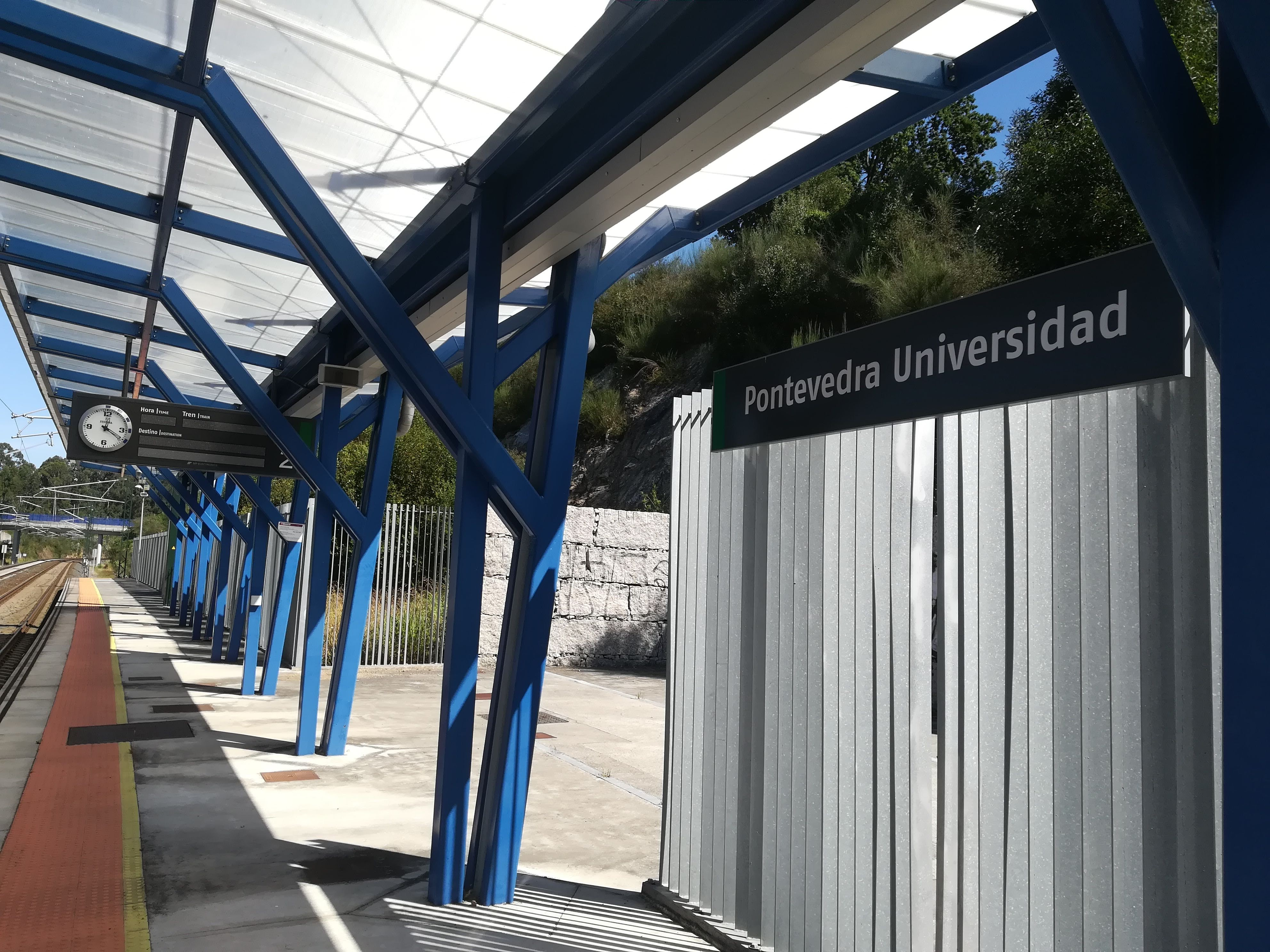
Pontevedra-Universidad railway station

== See also ==
=== Bibliography ===
- Porto Ucha, Ángel Serafín (2002). Instituciones para la formación de la mujer. La Escuela Normal Superior de Maestras de Pontevedra (in Spanish). Santiago de Compostela: Innovación educativa. pp. 17–46. ISSN 1130-8656.
- Porto Ucha, Ángel Serafín (2009). La Educación Especial en la formación de los maestros y maestras en el primer tercio del siglo XX : algunos datos referidos a Galicia (in Spanish). Pamplona: Universidad Pública de Navarra. pp. 335–344. ISBN 978-84-9769-244-1.

=== Related articles ===
- Casa de las Campanas
- Faculty of Fine Arts of Pontevedra
- UNED Associated Centre of Pontevedra

=== External links ===
- CAMPUS CREA - PONTEVEDRA
- Pontevedra campus
- Campus CREA
- Campus de Pontevedra rectorate
- Faculty of Fine Arts
- Faculty of Social Sciences and Communication
- Faculté des sciences de l'éducation et du sport
- Faculty of Education and Sport Sciences
- La creación de las primeras Escuelas Normales en Galicia
- Creation of the Normal School of Pontevedra
- Faculty of Physiotherapy
- School of Forestry Engineering
- Nursing School
- University Centre of Defence
- UNED Pontevedra
