= Faculty of Physiotherapy of Pontevedra =

Faculty in Pontevedra, Spain

- Facultad de Fisioterapia de Pontevedra
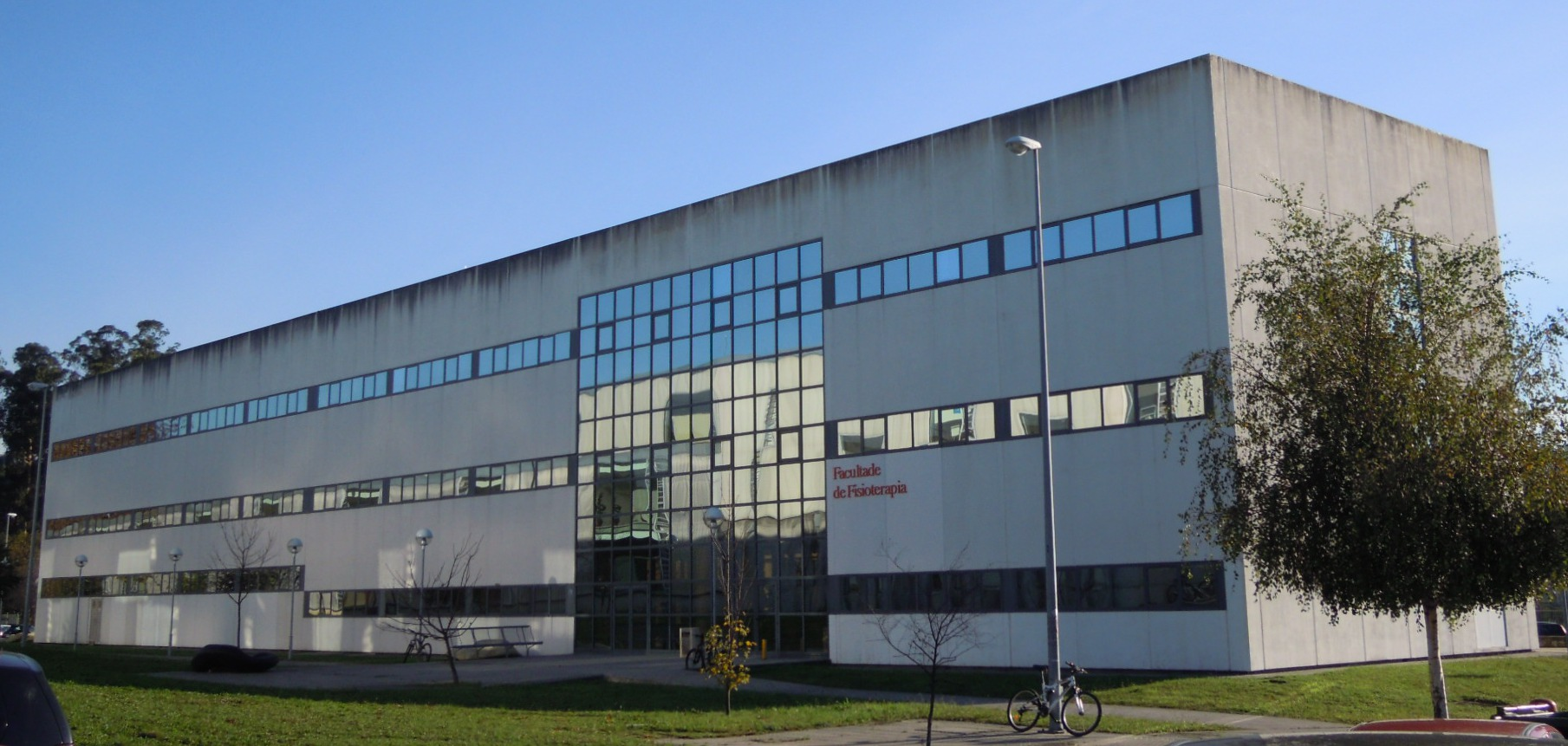
- Faculty façade
- Type: Public Faculty
- Established: 1993
- Parent institution: University of Vigo
- Affiliations: Pontevedra Campus
- Students: 224
- Location: Pontevedra, Spain; 42°26′27.9″N 8°38′10.8″W
- Campus: A Xunqueira campus

The Faculty of Physiotherapy of Pontevedra is a university faculty founded in 1998 in the Spanish city of Pontevedra, based on the campus of A Xunqueira, in the north of the city.

The faculty belongs to the Pontevedra Campus, integrated in the Galician University System and dependent on the University of Vigo. It offers undergraduate and postgraduate studies in Physiotherapy and Health Sciences.

== History ==
The introduction of physiotherapy studies in Pontevedra was authorised in 1993 by Decree 192/1993, of 29 July, article 20, which integrated them into the newly created Faculty of Social Sciences of the city.

However, the establishment of the physiotherapy programme on the Pontevedra university campus was finally effective in October 1995, when teaching began at the Faculty of Social Sciences.

In 1998, the Regional Ministry of Education created the University School of Physiotherapy of Pontevedra by Decree 346/1998 of 20 November, in its article 7, separating the teaching of physiotherapy from the Faculty of Social Sciences in which it was housed until then. The courses were temporarily held at the School of Forestry Engineers until 2000, when the new building designed by the architect José Ramón Rúa Rodríguez was inaugurated on the A Xunqueira campus, which was to become its definitive headquarters.

In 2009 a new degree programme was approved and in 2011 the University School of Physiotherapy became the Faculty of Physiotherapy by Decree 14/2011 of 3 February, as stated in its second article.

== Programmes ==
The Faculty of Physiotherapy in Pontevedra offers Bachelor's and master's degree courses in the field of physiotherapy.

- Bachelor's degree in physiotherapy
- Master in Therapeutic Practice in Physiotherapy, for which 20 places are available.

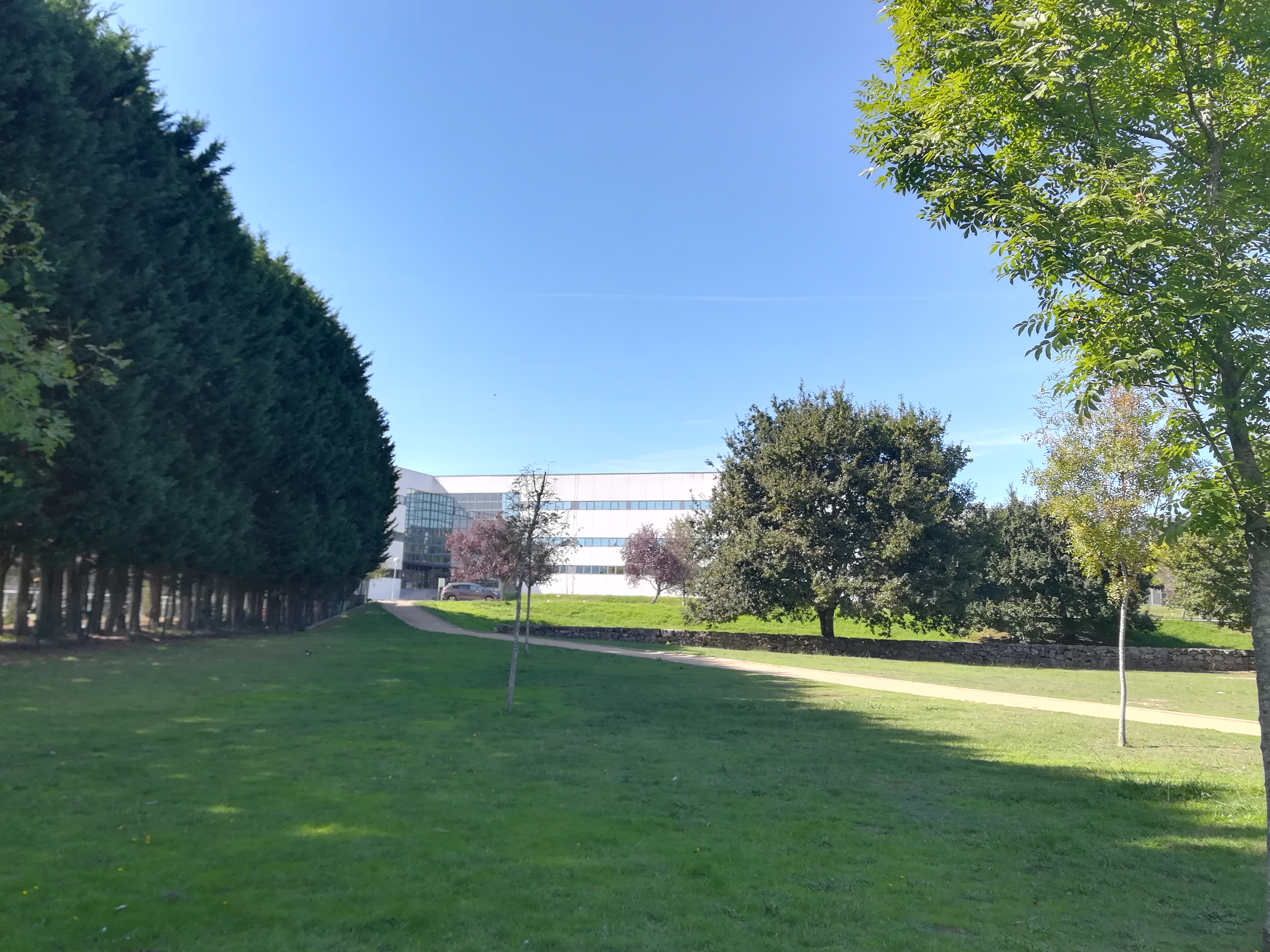
The faculty is very close to the Sculpture Island park.

== Activities ==
The Faculty has agreements with various private centres and with the Galician Health Service for clinical training. It also has agreements with several European countries to host Erasmus students, as well as with 6 Spanish universities and specific agreements with Latin American universities.

== Culture ==
The patron saint of the faculty is Saint Achilles and the faculty celebrates his feast day in April.

== Popular students ==
- Teresa Portela Rivas
- Susana Rodríguez Gacio

== Gallery ==
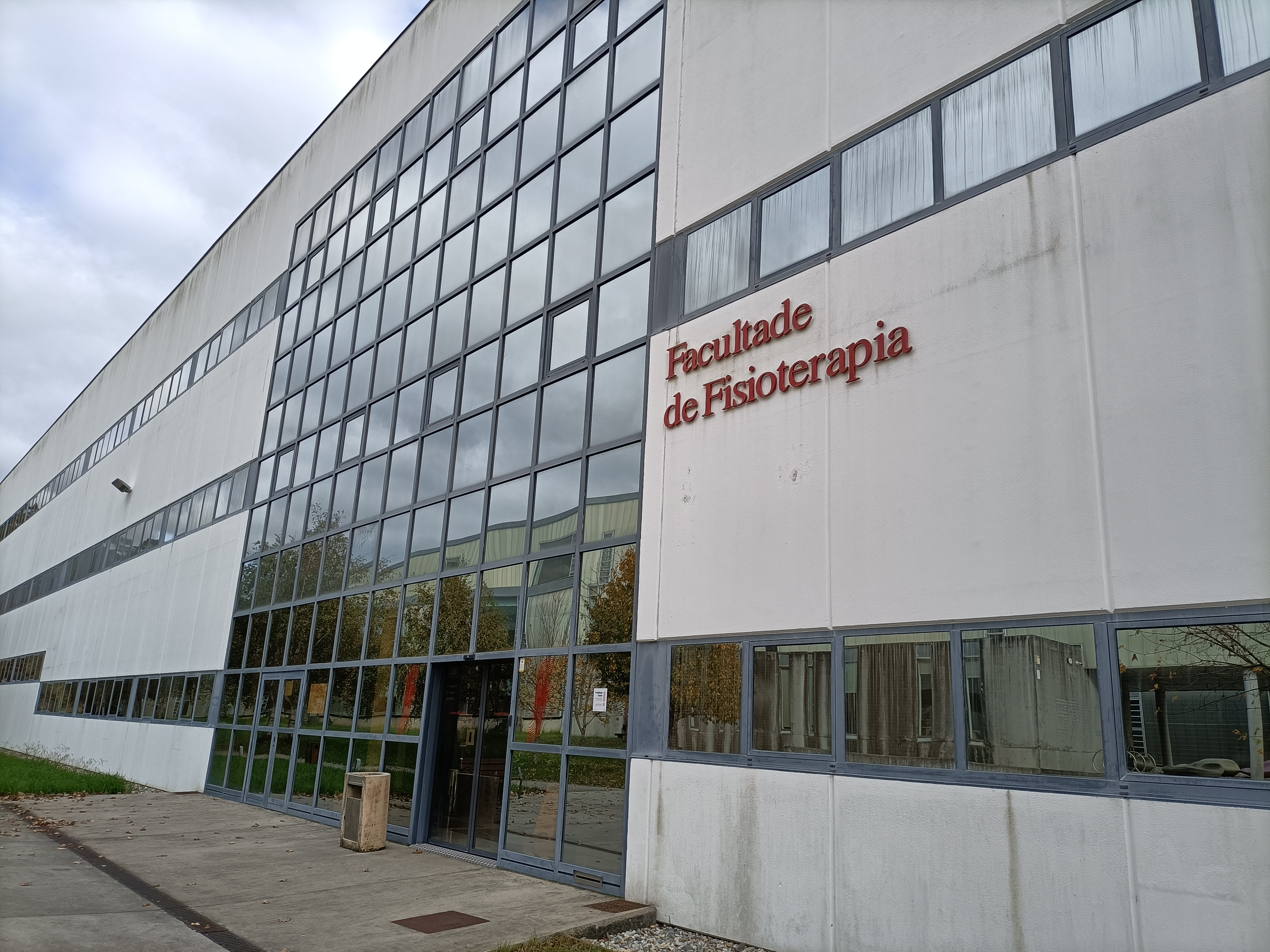
Entrance to the faculty

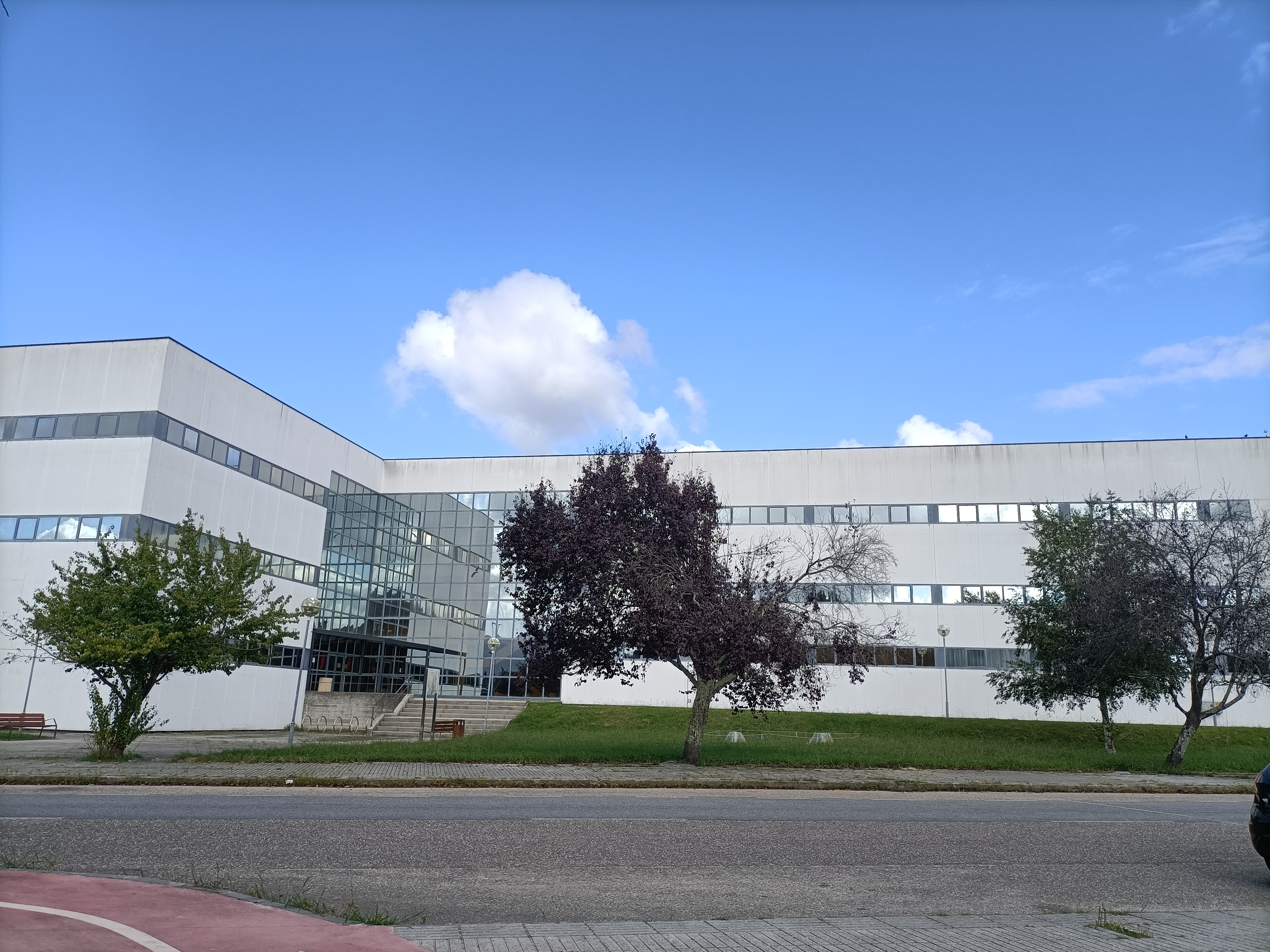
East façade

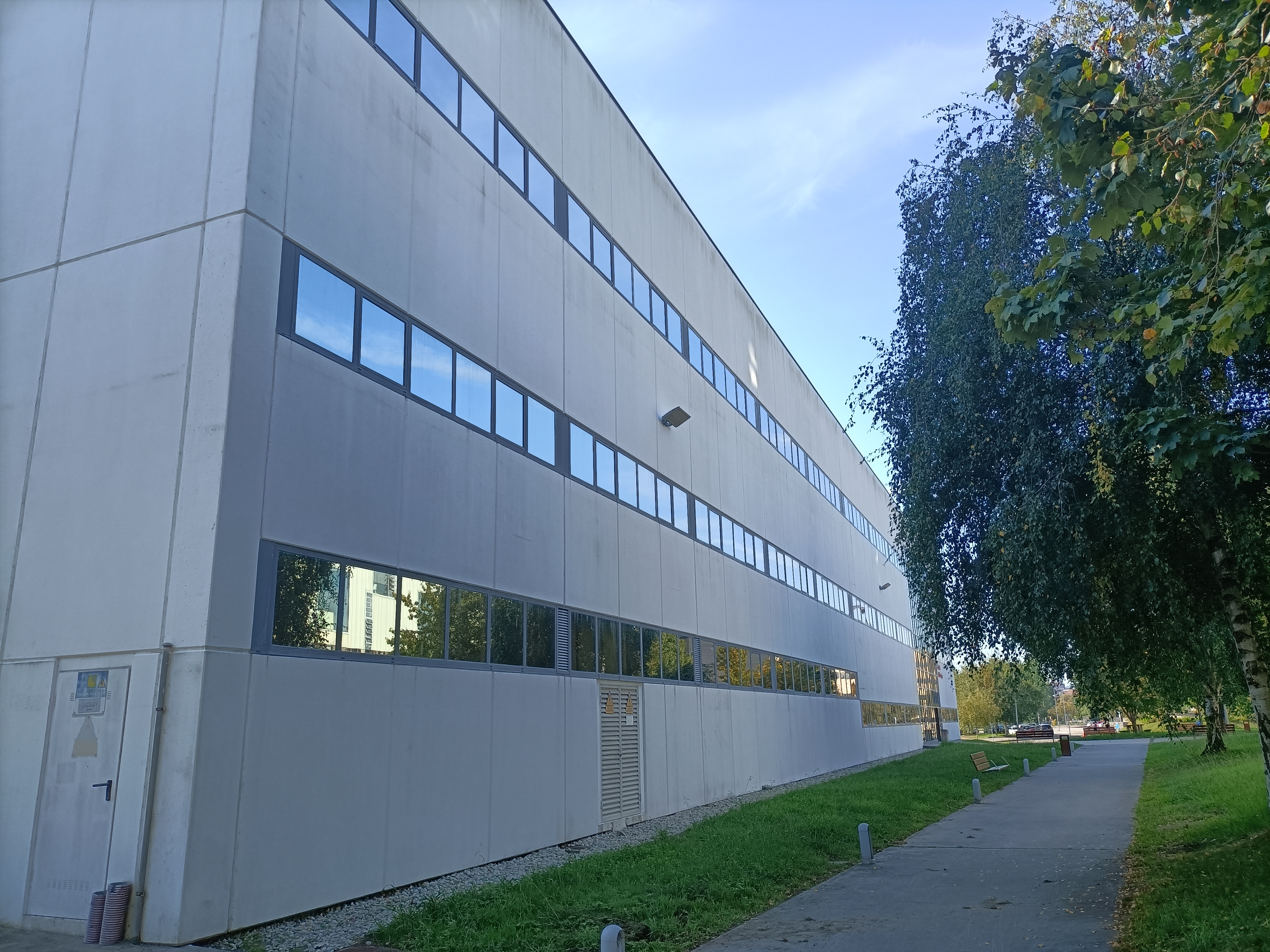
North-west façade

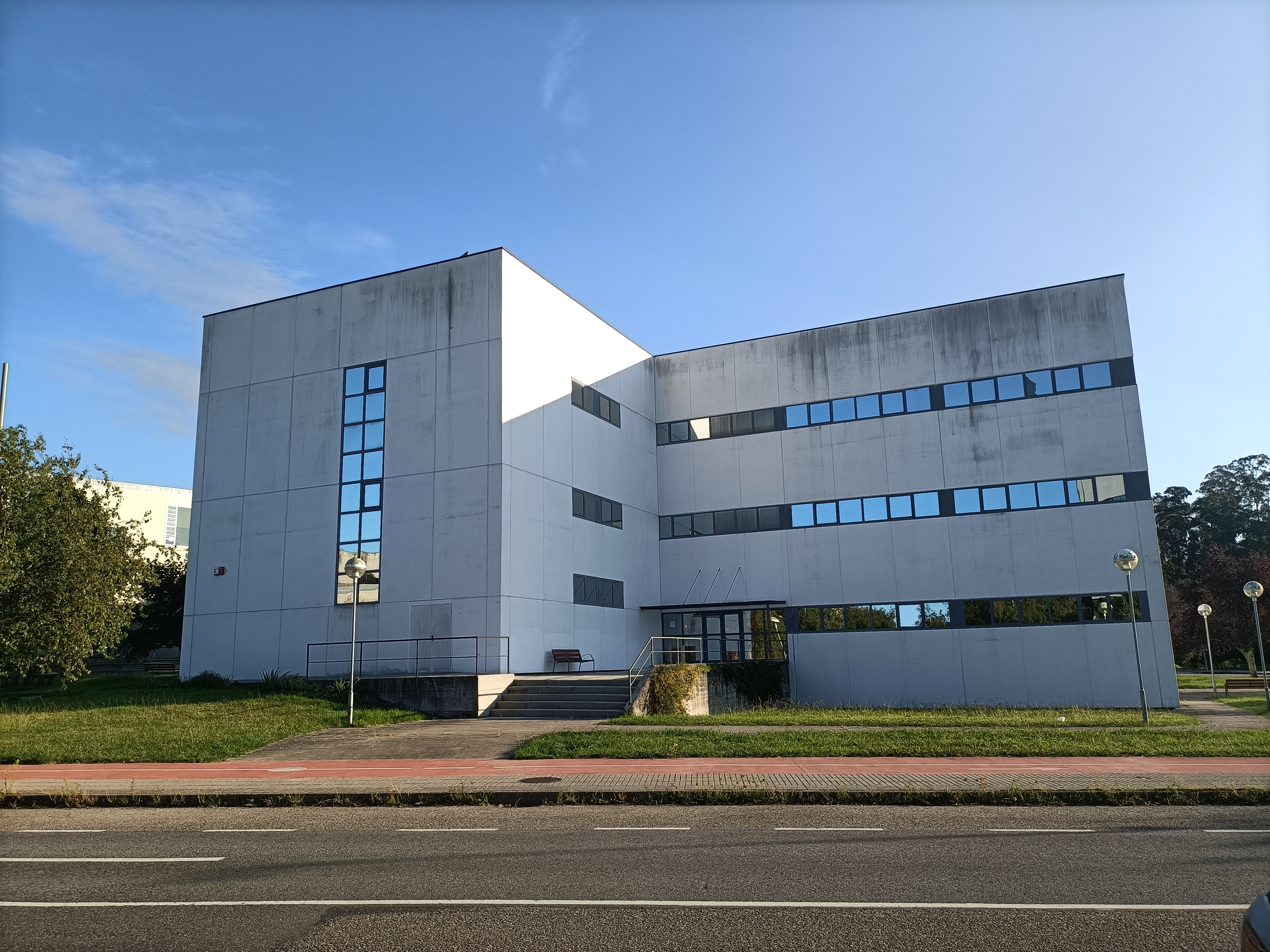
Southwest lateral façade

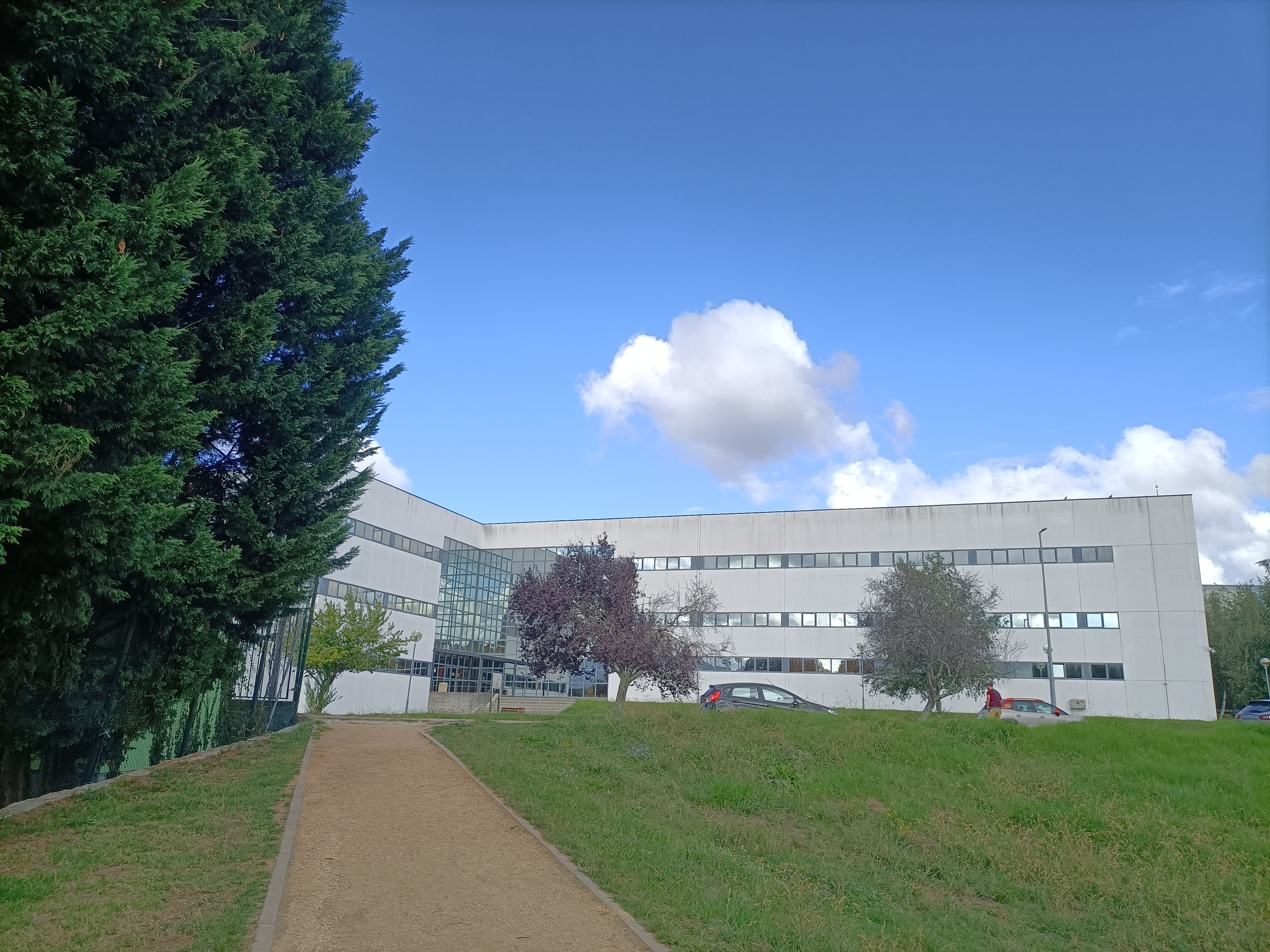
Facade from the Family Park

== See also ==
=== Related articles ===
- School of Forest Engineering of Pontevedra
- Faculty of Communication of Pontevedra
- Faculty of Education and Sport of Pontevedra
- School of Nursing of Pontevedra
