= School of Nursing of Pontevedra =

School in Pontevedra, Spain

- Escuela Universitaria de Enfermería de Pontevedra
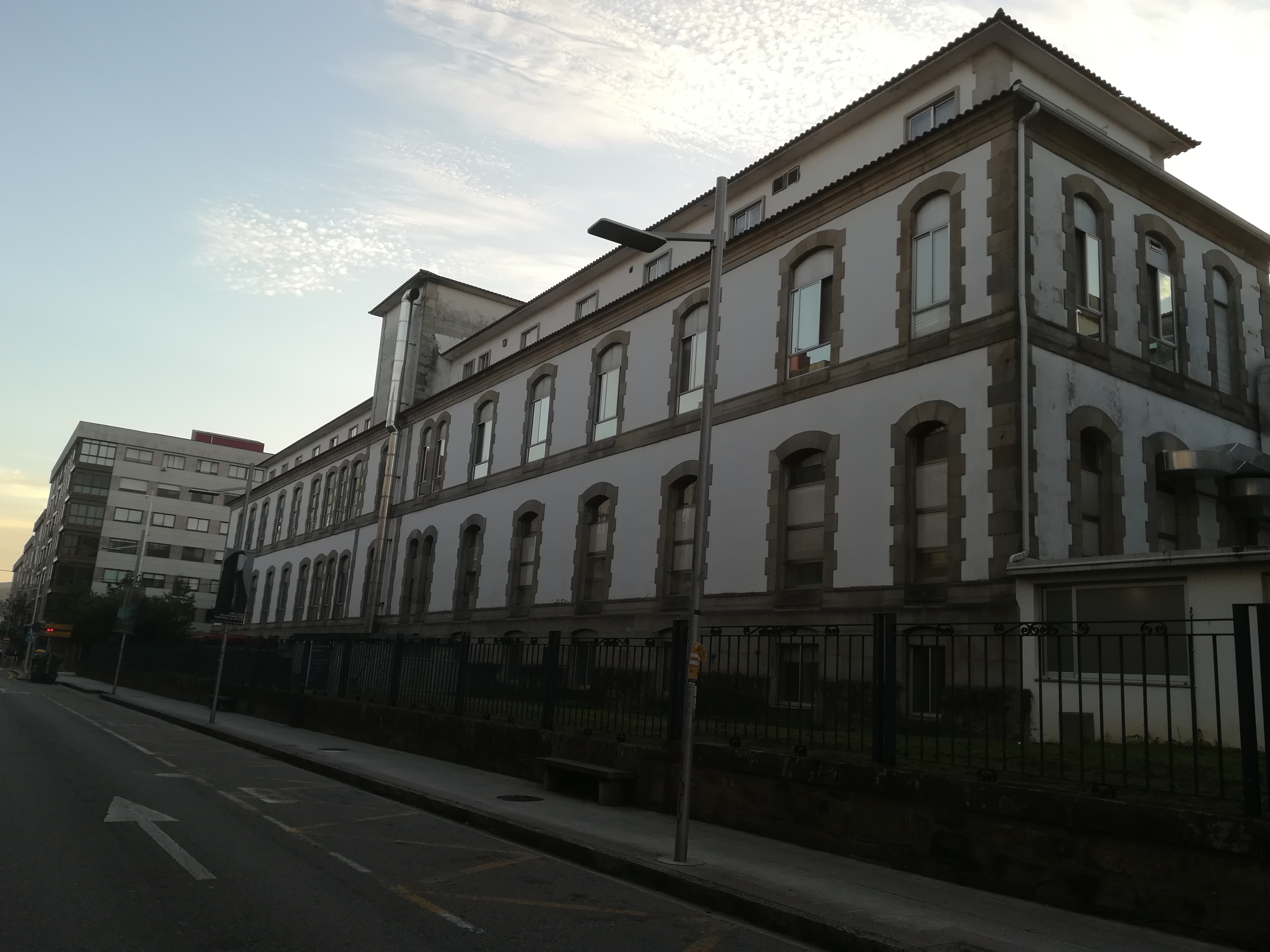
- Provincial Hospital of Pontevedra where the nursing school is located.
- Type: Public School
- Established: 1974
- Parent institution: University of Vigo
- Affiliations: Pontevedra Campus
- Students: 220
- Location: Pontevedra, Spain; 42°25′40.9″N 8°38′14.3″W
- Campus: City centre

The Pontevedra Nursing School is a university school founded in 1974 in the Spanish city of Pontevedra, based in the city centre, on the premises of the Pontevedra Provincial Hospital.

The school belongs to the Pontevedra Campus, integrated in the Galician University System and attached to the University of Vigo. It offers undergraduate studies in Nursing.

== History ==
The Pontevedra School of Nursing has its origins in the former Red Cross School of Technical Health Assistants (ATS), created in 1974. This nursing school was created by the impulse of the high school teacher and delegate president of the Red Cross of Pontevedra Marcelino Jiménez Jiménez, the director of the provincial hospital of Pontevedra Manuel Castro-Rial Canosa and the president of the provincial council of Pontevedra José Luis Peláez Casalderrey and was created by the provincial council of Pontevedra. The Ministerial Order of 19 September 1974 of the Ministry of Education authorised the provisional operation of the school.

In 1975, with the decree of 28 January 1975, the creation of the School of Technical Health Assistants (ATS) of Pontevedra was authorised and its academic and theoretical-practical activities were established in the "Grand Provincial Hospital" of the Provincial Council, it was attached to the Faculty of Medicine of Santiago de Compostela and its regulations were approved. A few months later, by the decree of 2 April 1975, the School of Technical Health Assistants was created at the Montecelo Social Security Health Residence in Pontevedra (now Montecelo Hospital) and was also attached to the Faculty of Medicine of Santiago de Compostela, and its regulations were approved.

In 1978, by Royal Decree 3117/1978 of 10 November, the ATS School of the Deputation of Pontevedra was transformed into a University School of Nursing and was attached to the University of Santiago de Compostela, thus offering university degree studies.

In 1990, by decree of the Regional Ministry of Education and University Teaching for the separation of the centres and services of the University of Santiago de Compostela, in its article 1, the school was attached to the new University of Vigo.

The school was located in the former provincial hospice in Sierra Street until 1993, when it moved to the fourth and fifth floors of one of the buildings of the provincial hospital of Pontevedra.

Since September 2011, the school offers a nursing degree organised in four academic years, in line with the implementation of the Bologna Process or the European Higher Education Area (EHEA).

== Programmes ==
The school offers a Bachelor's degree in nursing.

== Direction team ==
The director of the nursing school since 2010 is Miguel Ángel Piñón Cimadevila. The deputy director is María Paz Diéguez Montes and the secretary is María Teresa Hermo Gonzalo. The university delegate is Rafael Durán Barbosa.

== Organization ==
The nursing school is owned by the Provincial Council of Pontevedra, at a cost of 500,000 euros per year.

The school is governed by a governing board composed, among others, of the director of the school, the president of the provincial council of Pontevedra, the director of the university hospital complex of Pontevedra and a delegate from the university.

== See also ==
=== Related articles ===
- Pontevedra Provincial Hospital
- Faculty of Physiotherapy of Pontevedra

=== External links ===
- School website
