= Faculty of Management and Public Administration of Pontevedra =

Faculty in Pontevedra, Spain

- Facultad de Dirección y Gestión Pública
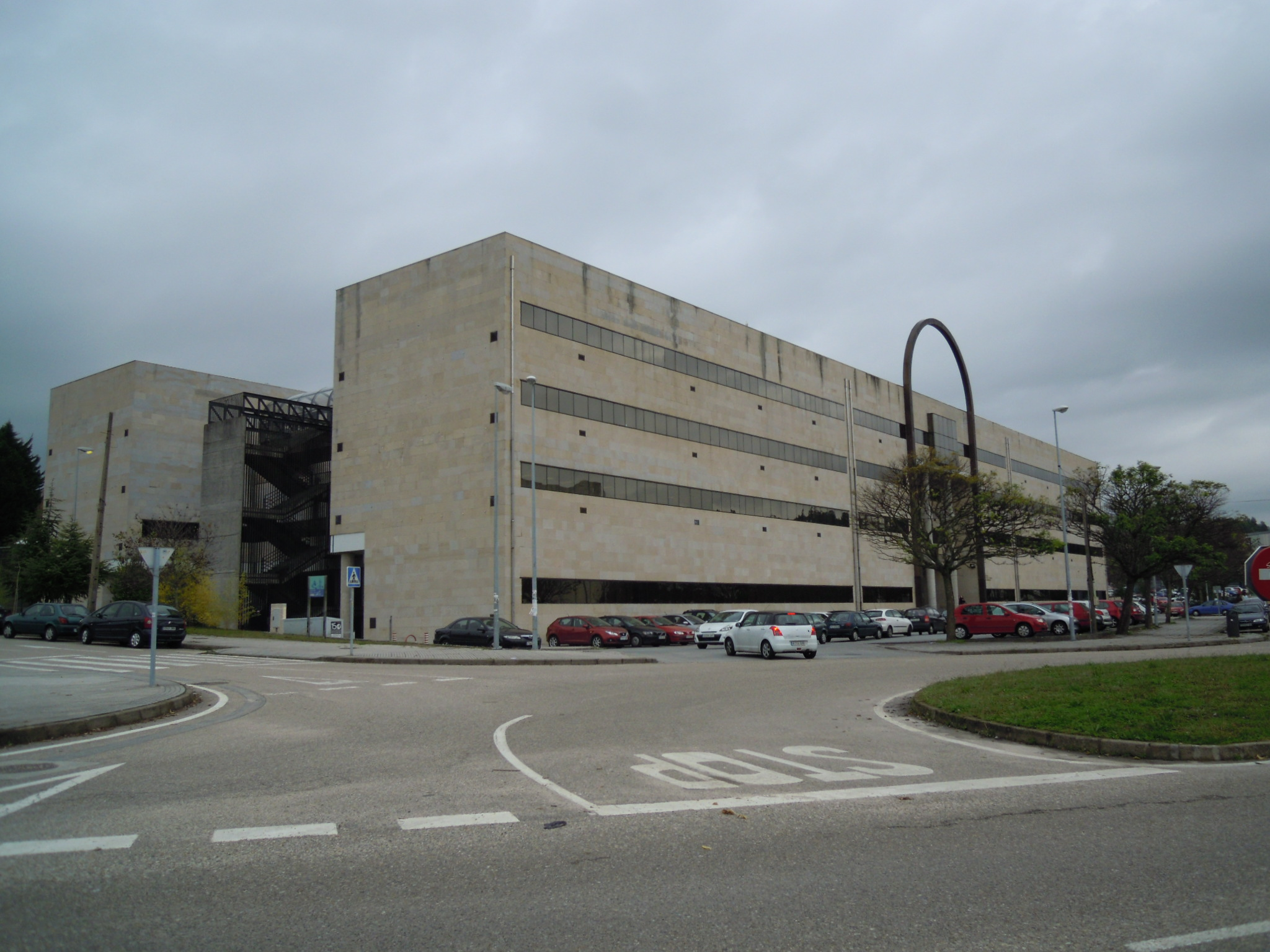
- Faculty façade
- Type: Public Faculty
- Established: 2022
- Parent institution: University of Vigo
- Affiliations: Pontevedra Campus
- Students: 225
- Location: Pontevedra, Spain; 42°26′24.6″N 8°38′16.6″W
- Campus: A Xunqueira campus

The Faculty of Management and Public Administration of Pontevedra is a university faculty founded in 2022 in the Spanish city of Pontevedra, based on the campus of A Xunqueira, in the north of the city.

The faculty belongs to the Pontevedra Campus, integrated in the Galician University System and dependent on the University of Vigo. It offers undergraduate and postgraduate studies in Management and Public Administration.

== History ==
The Faculty of Management and Public Administration of Pontevedra was created in 2022 by Decree 133/2022, of 7 July, in its article 2. Until then, Management and Public Administration studies were integrated into the Faculty of Social Sciences and Communication.

In 1999, by Decree 250/1999 of 9 September, article 4, the Faculty of Social Sciences introduced the studies of Management and Public Administration, the only ones of this type in Galicia, being the second university degree that can be obtained in this faculty.

In 2009, a new degree in Management and Public Administration was approved by Decree 385/2009 of 27 August 2009 of the Regional Ministry of Education, in Article 3. During the academic year 2009–2010, significant changes were made to the structure of the curriculum and the internships, and the new programme was published by the resolution of 15 October 2010.

The Faculty of Management and Public Administration is currently located in the same building as the Faculty of Communication on the A Xunqueira campus. In the future, a building will be constructed to house it in the Tafisa area, on the other side of the Lérez, together with the new Faculty of Design.

== Programmes ==
The Faculty of Management and Public Administration of Pontevedra offers Bachelor's and master's degree courses in the field of public administration.

- Bachelor's degree in public management and administration. Two study modalities are offered: one face-to-face and the other virtual. This is a unique degree in the Galician university system and some subjects can be studied in English.
- Master in Public Management and Institutional Leadership. It is offered online.

The faculty coordinates a Ph.D. in creativity and social and sustainable innovation.

== Activities ==
The Faculty organises educational activities for its students, such as visits to the Parliament of Galicia or to the Ombudsman. In addition, the Faculty has internship agreements with companies and public administrations. It is one of the degrees with the highest and fastest employability of students.

After each electoral process in Spain, the faculty's teaching staff specialising in Political Science and Administration and the school's student delegates hold a public meeting to analyse the results of the municipal, regional and national elections in a scientific-political manner.

== See also ==
=== Related articles ===
- Faculty of Communication of Pontevedra

=== External links ===
- Faculty website
