= Faculty of Communication of Pontevedra =

Faculty in Pontevedra, Spain

Communication Faculty of Pontevedra
- Facultad de Comunicación de Pontevedra
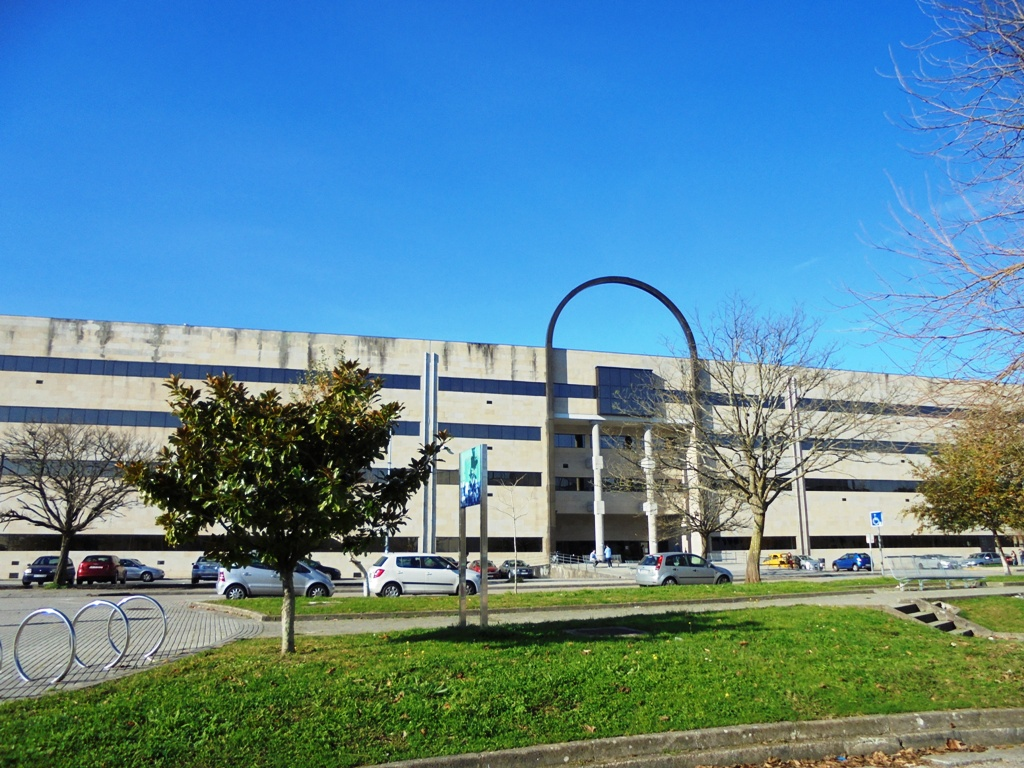
- Faculty façade
- Former names: Faculty of Social Sciences
- Type: Public Faculty
- Established: 1993
- Parent institution: University of Vigo
- Affiliations: Pontevedra Campus
- Students: 700
- Location: Pontevedra, Spain; 42°26′24.9″N 8°38′16.3″W
- Campus: A Xunqueira campus

The Faculty of Communication of Pontevedra is a university faculty founded in 1993 in the Spanish city of Pontevedra, located in the campus of A Xunqueira, in the north of the city.

The faculty belongs to the Pontevedra Campus, integrated in the Galician University System and dependent on the University of Vigo. It offers undergraduate, graduate and doctoral studies in Communication.

== History ==
The Faculty of Social Sciences of Pontevedra, which is the origin of the current Faculty of Communication, was created by Decree 192/1993, of 29 July, in its article 19. The degree in Advertising and Public relations, the only one in the Galician university system, was the first to be implemented in the Faculty. The dean-commissioner who drew up the programme for the new degree was Alejandro Pizarroso Quintero, professor at the Faculty of Information Sciences of the Complutense University of Madrid. The programme was approved on 1 July 1994.

The Faculty of Social Sciences began operating in Pontevedra on 10 October 1994 in a temporary building, the former Provincial Hospice in Sierra Street, where it remained until 2000, when the new large Faculty building built on the A Xunqueira Campus, designed by the Santiago de Compostela architect José Carlos Arrojo Lois, began its activities.

In 1999, by Decree 250/1999 of 9 September, Article 4, management and public administration studies were proposed as a second university degree to be obtained in the college.

In May 2003, the faculty was allowed to offer a degree in audiovisual communication and the name of the faculty was changed from Social Sciences to Faculty of Social Sciences and Communication.

On 7 July 2022, by Decree 133/2022, the Faculty of Public Management and Administration was created on the Pontevedra campus, and the bachelor's degree in public management and administration and the Master in Public Management and Institutional Leadership are now offered in this faculty.

On 29 December 2022, by Decree 230/2022 of the Regional Ministry of Education, the faculty was renamed Faculty of Communication.

== Programmes ==
=== Undergraduate ===
- Bachelor's degree in advertising and public relations.
- Bachelor's degree in audiovisual communication.

=== Postgraduate ===
The Faculty offers the following master's degrees:

- Master's degree in art direction in advertising.
- Master's degree in social media communication and digital content creation.

The Faculty also offers a PhD in communication, approved by the University Council.

== Facilities ==
The central library of the Pontevedra campus is located on the first floor of the faculty. The building has two radio studios and two sets (television and cinema). It also has a Pro Tools room, where a professional demo can be shot, twelve Avid editing booths and several computer rooms.

== Deanery staff ==
The Dean of the Faculty is Xosé Manuel Baamonde Silva, and the Vice Deans are José Pita, Xabier Martínez Rolán and Rosa Ricoy Casas. The secretary is Silvia García Mirón.

== Activities ==
The faculty hosts a week of conferences and training activities focused on advertising and audiovisual creativity, which take place during the month of April. They are grouped under the name of Culturkata, with the participation of leading professionals and former graduates as speakers.

== Culture ==
At the end of April, the main festival on the Pontevedra campus, Santa Kata or Santa Catabirra, is dedicated to the patron saint of the Faculty of Communication, Saint Catherine of Siena. Thousands of young people from all over Galicia participate in this festival.

== Gallery ==
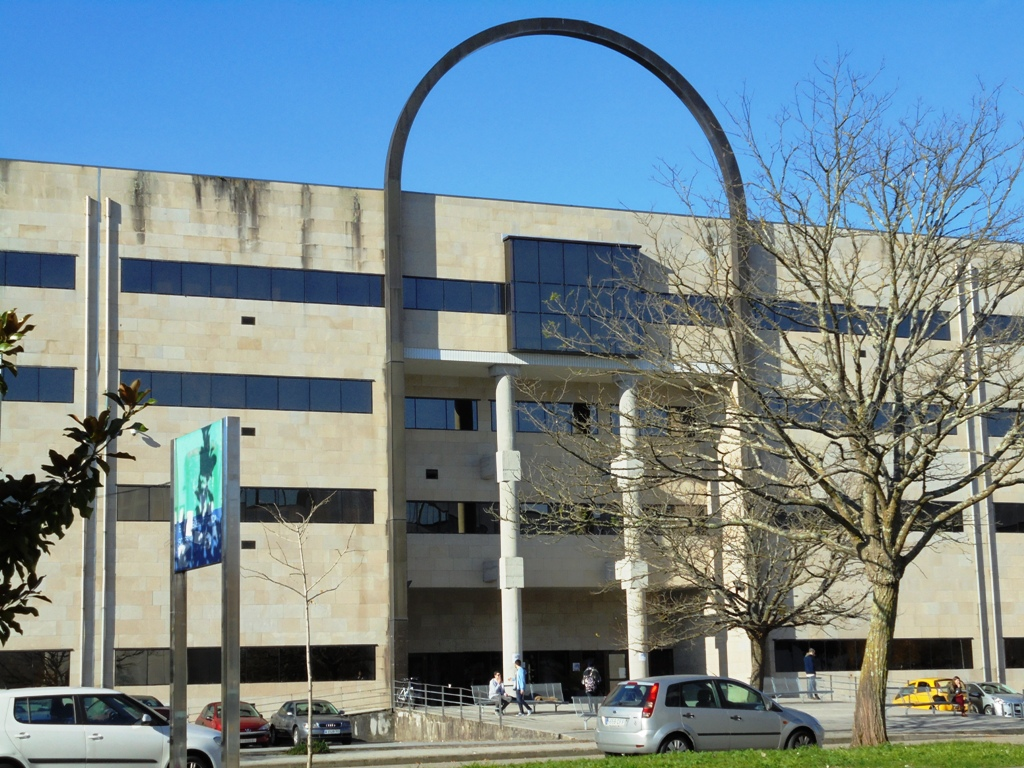
Faculty Entrance

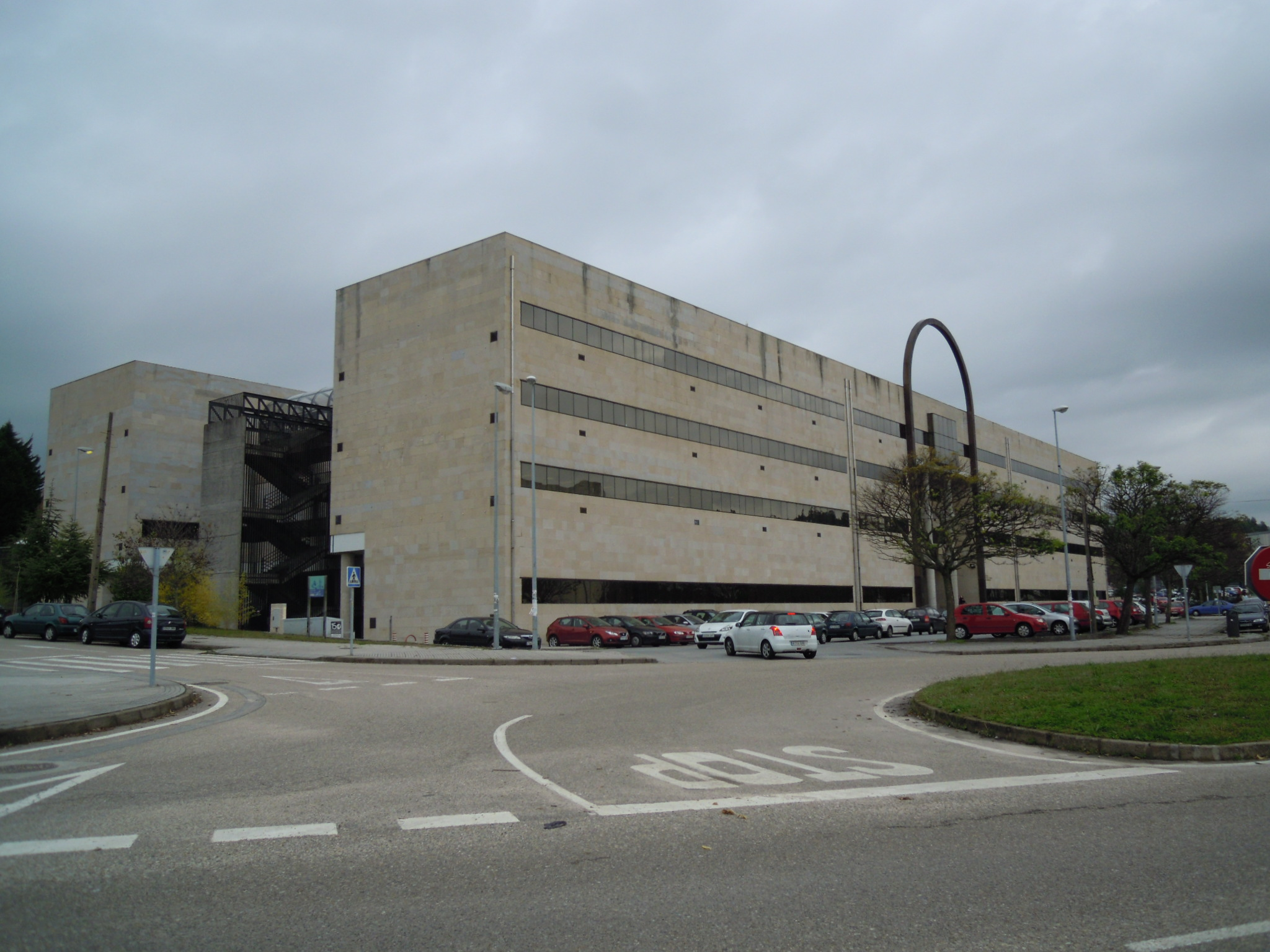
South façade

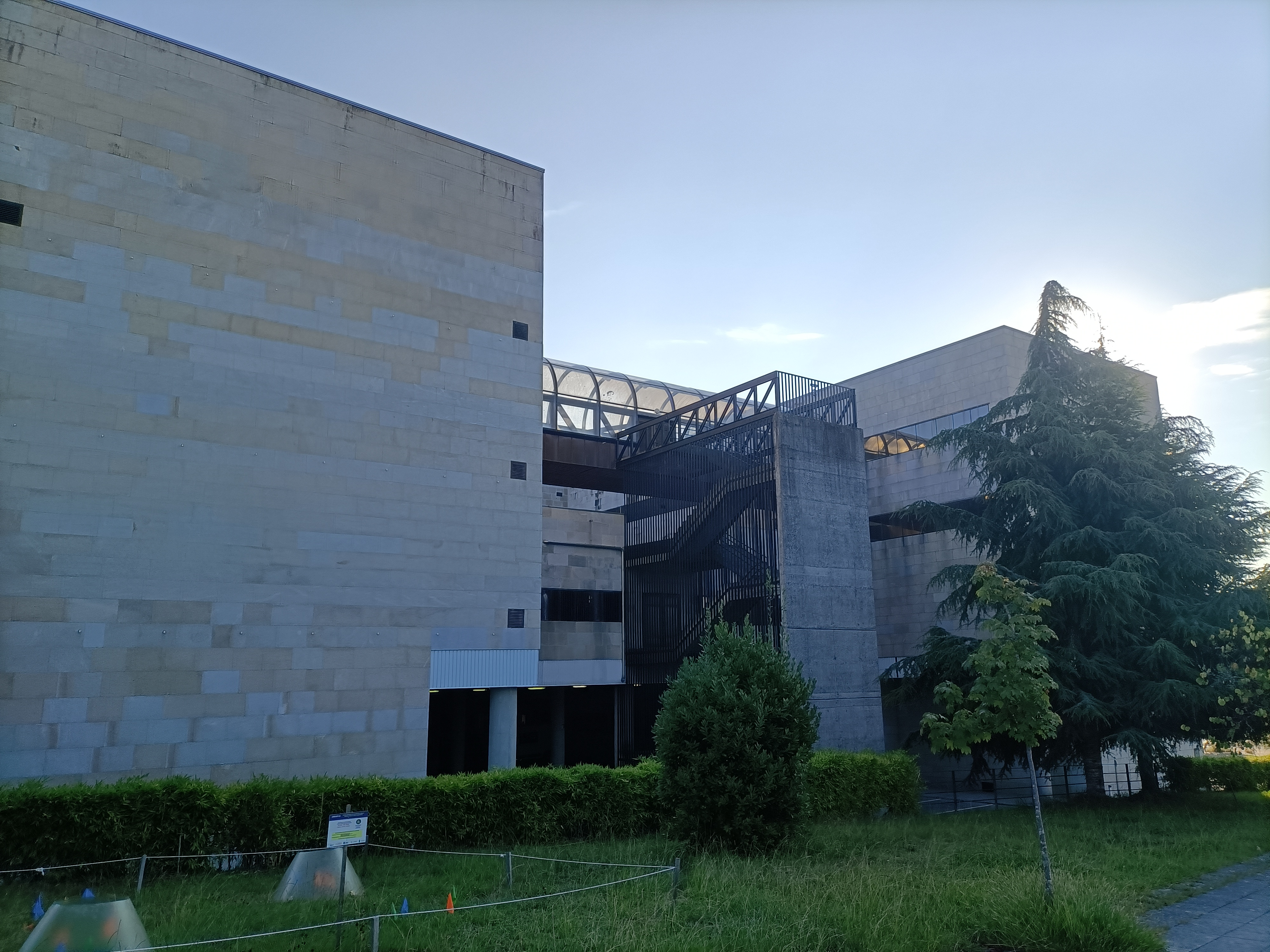
South-west side façade

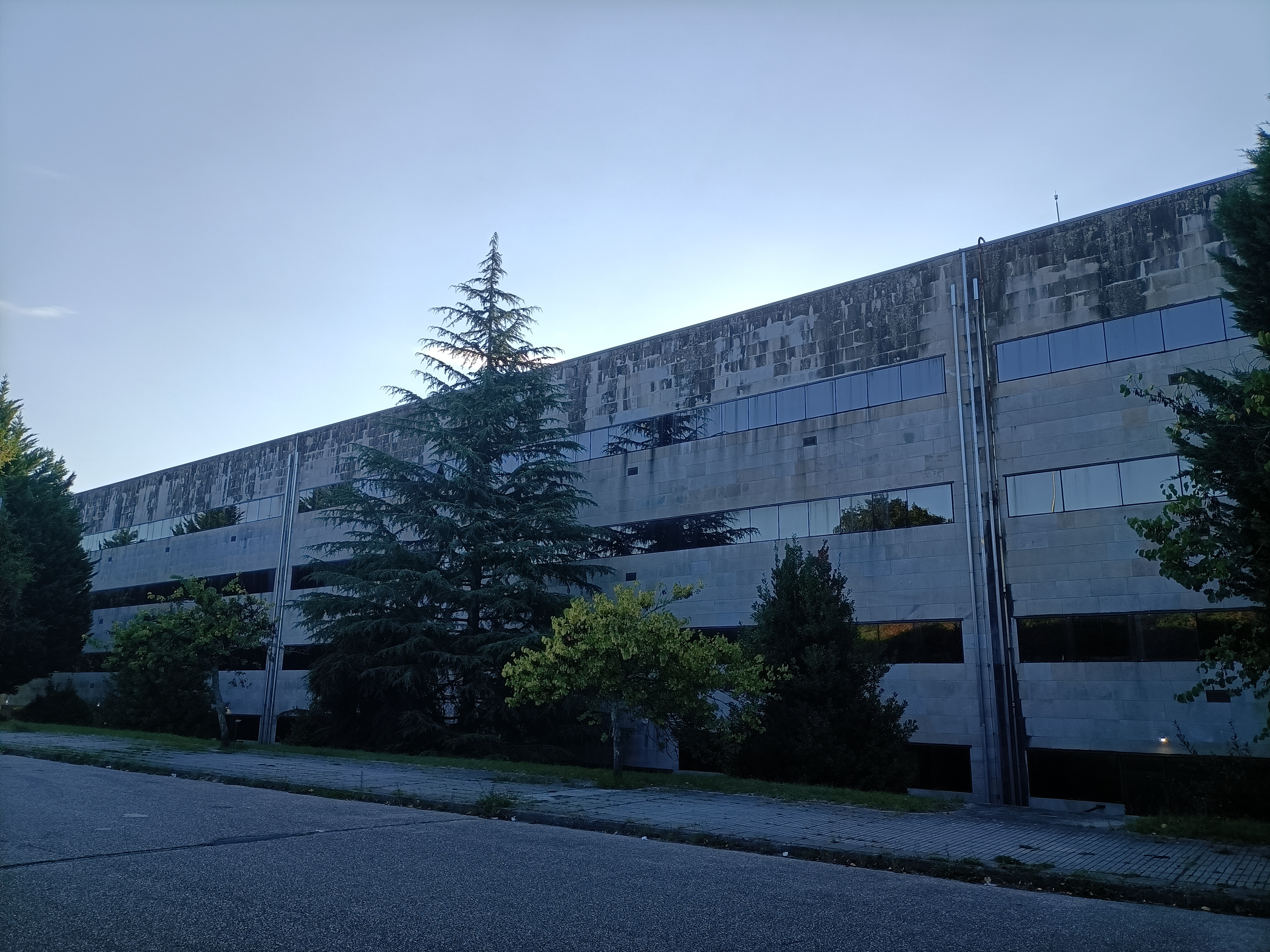
Faculty rear façade

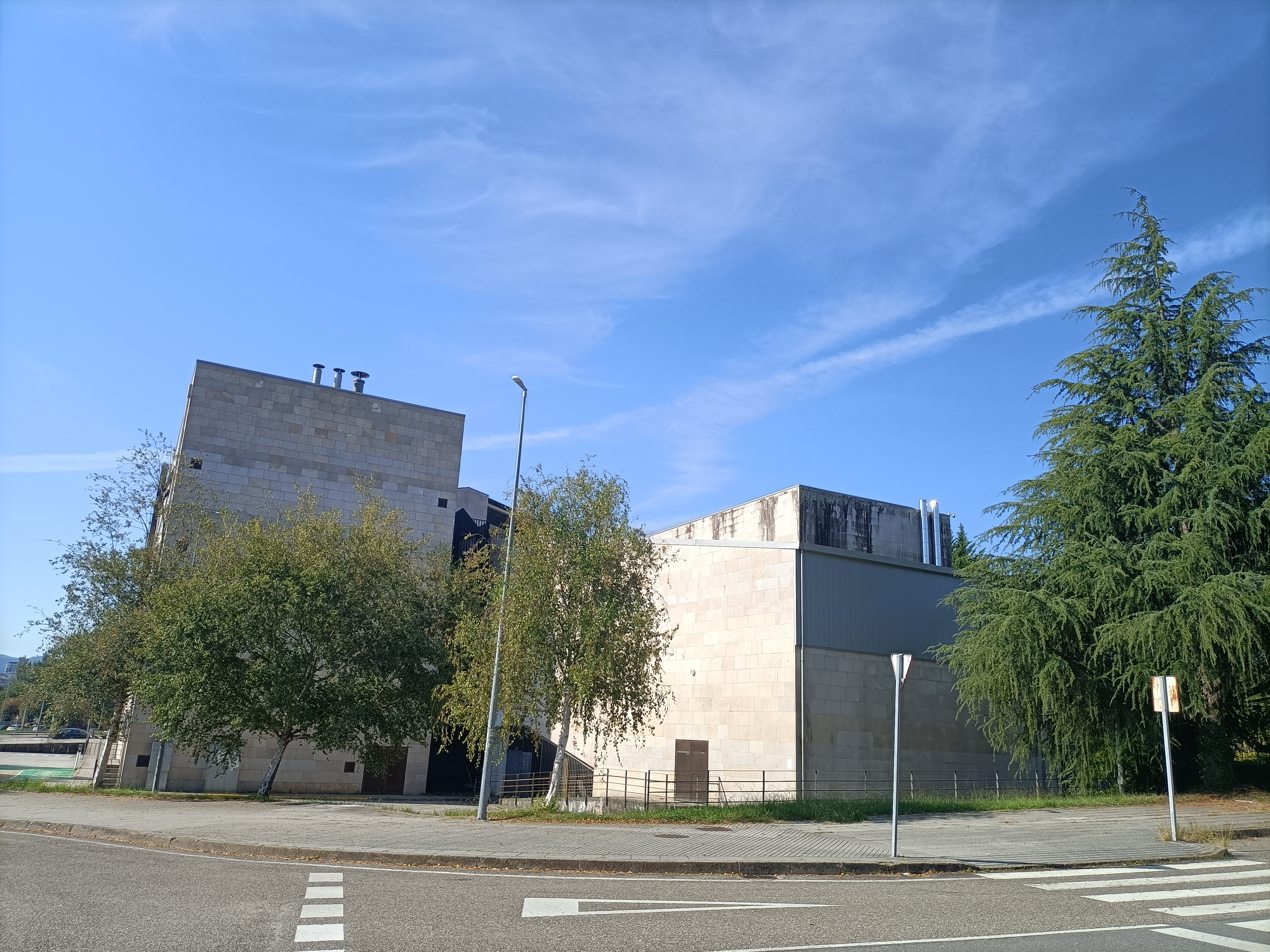
North-east side façade

== See also ==
=== Related articles ===
- Faculty of Fine Arts of Pontevedra
- Faculty of Management and Public Administration of Pontevedra
- Faculty of Physiotherapy of Pontevedra
- Pontevedra Campus

=== External links ===
- Faculty website
