= Stadtarchiv München =

Archive in Bavaria, Germany

Coordinates: 48°09′38″N 11°33′44″E

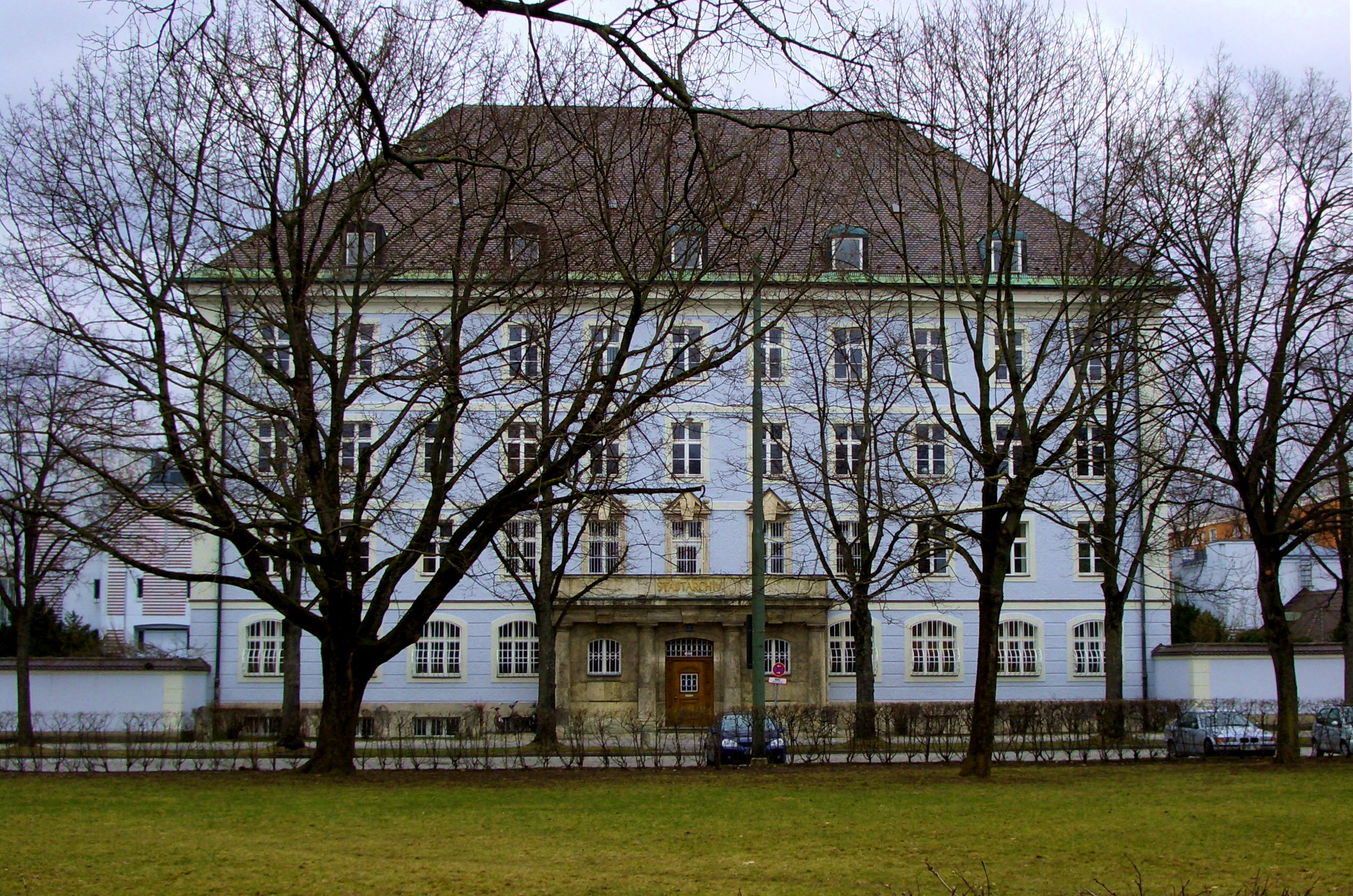
Stadtarchiv München, west wing

The Stadtarchiv München is the archive for the accumulating material from all municipal offices, businesses and companies of Munich; In addition, private holdings are also archived there. The Stadtarchiv is located in the Schwabing-West district. The older part of the building used to serve as a municipal military office.

== History ==
Since the Middle Ages, documents from the city life have been archived in Munich. As a rule, the city treasurer was responsible for this task. In 1771, a full-time registrar was appointed, who, starting in 1845, was responsible for keeping records of events that were important from every day. Since 1893 there is a separate municipal office. It was initially located in a building designed by Hans Grässel on Marienplatz; and in 1920 it moved to its current location.

== Building and location ==
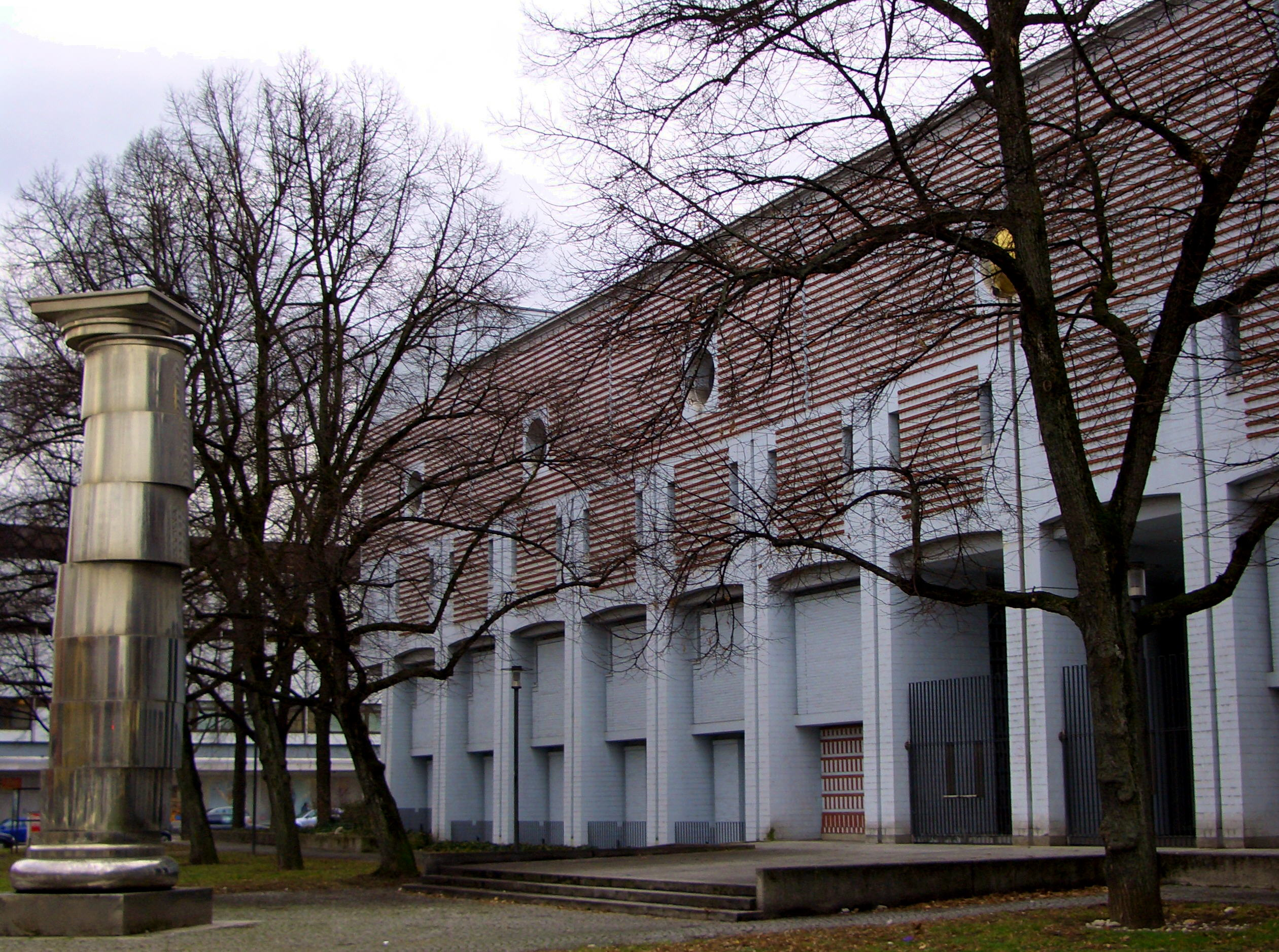
Stadtarchiv München, east wing with pillar from Anne and Patrick Poirier

The Stadtarchiv is located in the former municipal military office; the building was built in 1912–1914, also by Hans Grässel; it is an historically listed building. A large extension through plans by Hans-Busso von Busse, was built in 1990. Today, the Stadtarchiv occupy the entire block between Winzerer, Elisabeth, Schleißheimer and Hohenzollernstraße.

The golden medallion above the entrance on Schleißheimer Straße and the silver pillar in front of it are part of the ensemble Oculus historiae, oculus memoriae, oculus oblivionis from Anne and Patrick Poirier.

== Contents ==
Many documents concerning the city of Munich can be found in the Staatsarchiv München (Munich State Archives); this is due to the various competences from city and state, which were distributed differently in earlier times, for example in the area of police. Most of the documents in the Stadtarchiv originate naturally from the 19th and 20th centuries, the time after the onset of Munich's strongest growth.

The oldest document dates back to 1265. From the period before 1500, the Stadtarchiv has 2381 documents, and from the following three centuries a further 6922. A large portion of these documents are council minutes, tax books and chamber bills.

The contents of the Stadtarchiv are made up of the following parts: Bestand Bürgermeister und Rat (mayor and council) holdings contain documents from the highest city administration on all municipal tasks. The Gewerbeamt inventory contains documents from the field of business and industry, including the archive of the Spaten-Brauerei (Spaten Brewery). In the contents of the Lokalbaukommission (local construction committee), construction-historical material is collected, among other things building permit files and construction plans of private buildings; concerning Urban buildings, their contents are found in the construction office. Documents on municipal and private schools can be found in the inventory of the school office, such as urban cultural policy and development in the inventory of the cultural office – including files of the city museum and the Münchner Philharmoniker (Munich Philharmonic). These records include registration documents from the first third of the 19th century, the Munich city chronicle dating back to 1818, numerous legacies and a photo collection, which also contains compilations by Karl Valentin. Since September 2009, the Stadtarchiv store all Munich birth, marriage, and death certificates for which the statutory retention period has expired under the Civil Status Reform Act; before then it was the lone responsibility of the registry office.

Since 2016, the Stadtarchiv offers an online search facility, which allows a requirement-free as well as time and location-independent search of all holdings.

== Particularities ==
The city of Munich has received from the estate of Shalom Ben-Chorin, the entire contents of the deceased in 1999 religious philosophers home office; Furniture, books and other objects were brought from Jerusalem to Munich and they reconstructed the home office in 2009 in the Stadtarchiv with the original furnishings. The literary estate, Manuscripts and letters, were given to the literature archive Marbach. Ben-Chorin was born in Munich at Zweibrückenstraße 8 in 1913.

== Directors ==
- Pius Dirr (1917–)
- Reinhold Schaffer (−1958)
- Michael Schattenhofer (1958–1990)
- Richard Bauer (1980–2008)
- Michael Stephan (since 2008)
