= Island of Sculptures =

Sculptoric park in Pontevedra, Spain

- Illa das Esculturas; Isla de las Esculturas
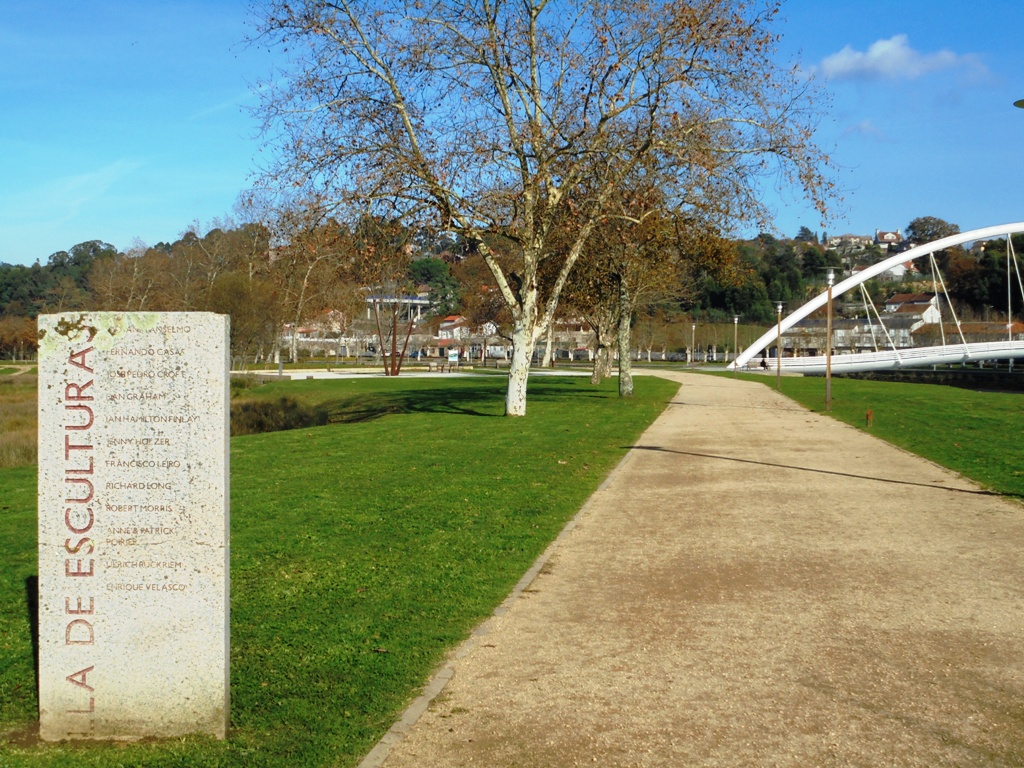
- Interactive map of Island of Sculptures
- Location: Pontevedra, Spain
- Coordinates: 42.439375°N 8.634032°W
- Area: 7 ha (17 acres)
- Created: 1997 (Park); 1999 (Sculptures)
- Operator: City Council of Pontevedra
- Status: Public park

Covo Island, better known as the Island of Sculptures or Illa das Esculturas in Galician, is a park and island located near the mouth of the Lérez River, in Pontevedra, Spain. It has an area of 70,000 m^{2} (750,000 sq ft) where twelve granite sculptures by international artists are displayed. It is the largest and most important open-air permanent exhibition in Galicia, and one of the most important in Spain.

In the island are displayed, among other, a 2 m (6 ft 7 in) high labyrinth by Robert Morris, a 5 m (16 ft) high pink granite menhir by Ulrich Rückriem, and a floating house on the river by Francisco Leiro. The island is connected to both banks of the river by footbridges and pedestrian bridges, and its aquatic fauna includes ducks and carps.

== History ==
The island was formed in the river from the sediments transported by the Lérez River deposited there because the river is already very close to sea level and loses its strength to carry these sediments away. At first, an intertidal plain was formed, but the Lérez found this obstacle on its way to the ria and sought another alternative route, thus opening a channel on the right side.

The island remained in the wilderness until 1997, when it was transformed into a park. Later, a project for the development of this space was carried out, with the creation of contemporary artworks by twelve internationally renowned artists, which took as their central theme the granite of Galicia and the relationship of man with his environment. This is the most important example of land art, a trend in contemporary art, in Galicia. The project was officially inaugurated on 29 July 1999.

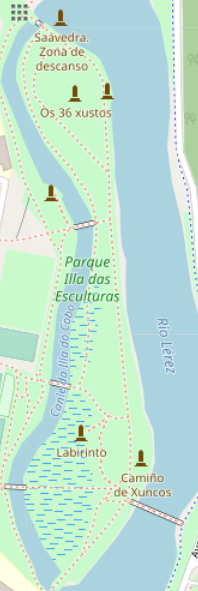
Map of the Island of Sculptures

== Description ==
The island, which has been declared a protected natural area, is almost a kilometre long and has an elongated shape. It has an area of rushes, meadows, a main path and secondary paths. Three wooden bridges cross the inner canal and a cable-stayed footbridge over the Lérez River connects it to the Paseo del Lérez. On the island there are twelve granite sculptures by international artists.

On the island come the tides and it is used by many birds as a breeding ground. It is a protected area declared LIC (place of community interest). Located near the Pontevedra Campus, the island is also used by many people as a place for walking or sports training.

=== Sculptures ===
The international authors and their sculptural works present on the island are:

- Italian Giovanni Anselmo with Cielo acortado. It is a black granite column from Campo Lameiro of 1.2 m (3 ft 11 in) that represents the space between heaven and earth.
- German Ulrich Rückriem with a pink granite Column recalling Galician traditions. It's a 5 m (16 ft) high stele at a crossroads.
- American Robert Morris created the Labyrinth of Pontevedra. He recreates with it the oldest petroglyph in Europe: the labyrinth of Mogor located in Marín. It is circular, two metres high and topped by a black slate roof.
- Portuguese José Pedro Croft with a House built in grey granite from Mondariz. It is a 3.2 m (10 ft) construction without doors or windows, which blends in with the surrounding nature. A tree is embedded in its walls as a symbol of nature in motion. The house reflects the small world that man builds for himself within the house that is nature and evokes rural houses absorbed by nature.
- American Jenny Holzer, who installed Eight grey stone benches on the island's central promenade, with twelve phrases or aphorisms of reflective intent inscribed on each one. The eight benches give art an everyday utility.
- English Richard Long with Pontevedra Line, a small wall 37 m (121 ft) long, made of pieces of white granite, which evokes the idea of the walk as action and thought.
- Scottish Ian Hamilton Finlay with Three green slate medallions hanging from eucalyptus trees, made of green granite, with the inscription Petrarch and Roman numerals corresponding to sonnets. It is a set of three green slate medallions engraved with the name of the Italian poet and the Roman number of a sonnet on each piece: Petrarch XXXV, Petrarch CXXXII and Petrarch CCCX. Finlay invites the spectator to search and discover what is hidden in this numerical key. These are verses of love and solitude with which the viewer enters into communication. The medallions are located on three eucalyptus trees five metres high, each facing a different cardinal point to play with the sun at different times of the day.
- French Anne and Patrick Poirier with Folie, a 3,000 m^{2} (32,000 sq ft) garden, outside the island to be viewed from it. The work is made of stainless steel, grey granite, plants, and trees.
- American Dan Graham with Pyramid. The pink granite pyramid is 1.9 m (6 ft 3 in) high, doubles in the waters of the river and contains three carved inverted pyramids. The work seeks the effect of light refraction and the granite is polished to achieve this effect. The pyramid is placed near the water of the river to obtain the reflection of the water as if it were a double pyramid.

The Spanish artists and their works are:

- Fernando Casás represents The 36 righteous who sustain the world of the Hebrew tradition by means of thirty-six blocks of black granite, like trunks of a felled and devastated forest, distributed throughout the island's own forest.
- Francisco Leiro with Saavedra installed a living room on a raft anchored in the Lérez river at the end of the island. This work is popularly known as La Batea. Saavedra turns a familiar space into an unreachable and uncomfortable one.
- Enrique Velasco, with a double Camino de Juncos (Reed Path) on the river bank showing the ductility and flexibility of the granite.

== Gallery ==
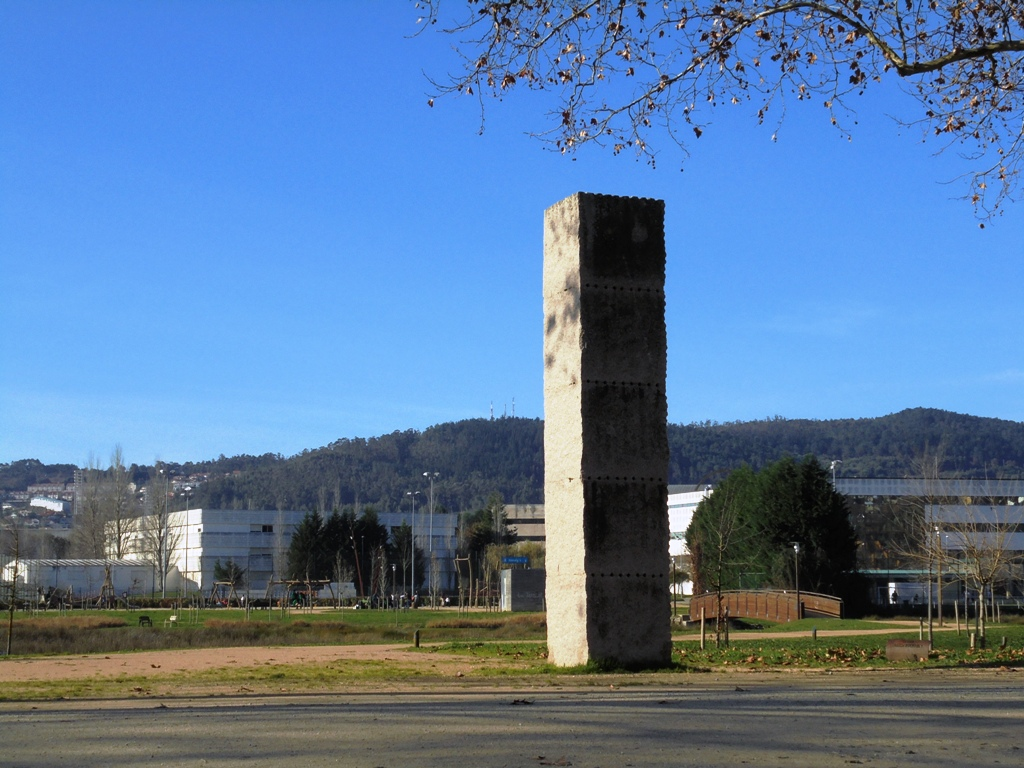
Untitled, granite menhir by Ulrich Rückriem

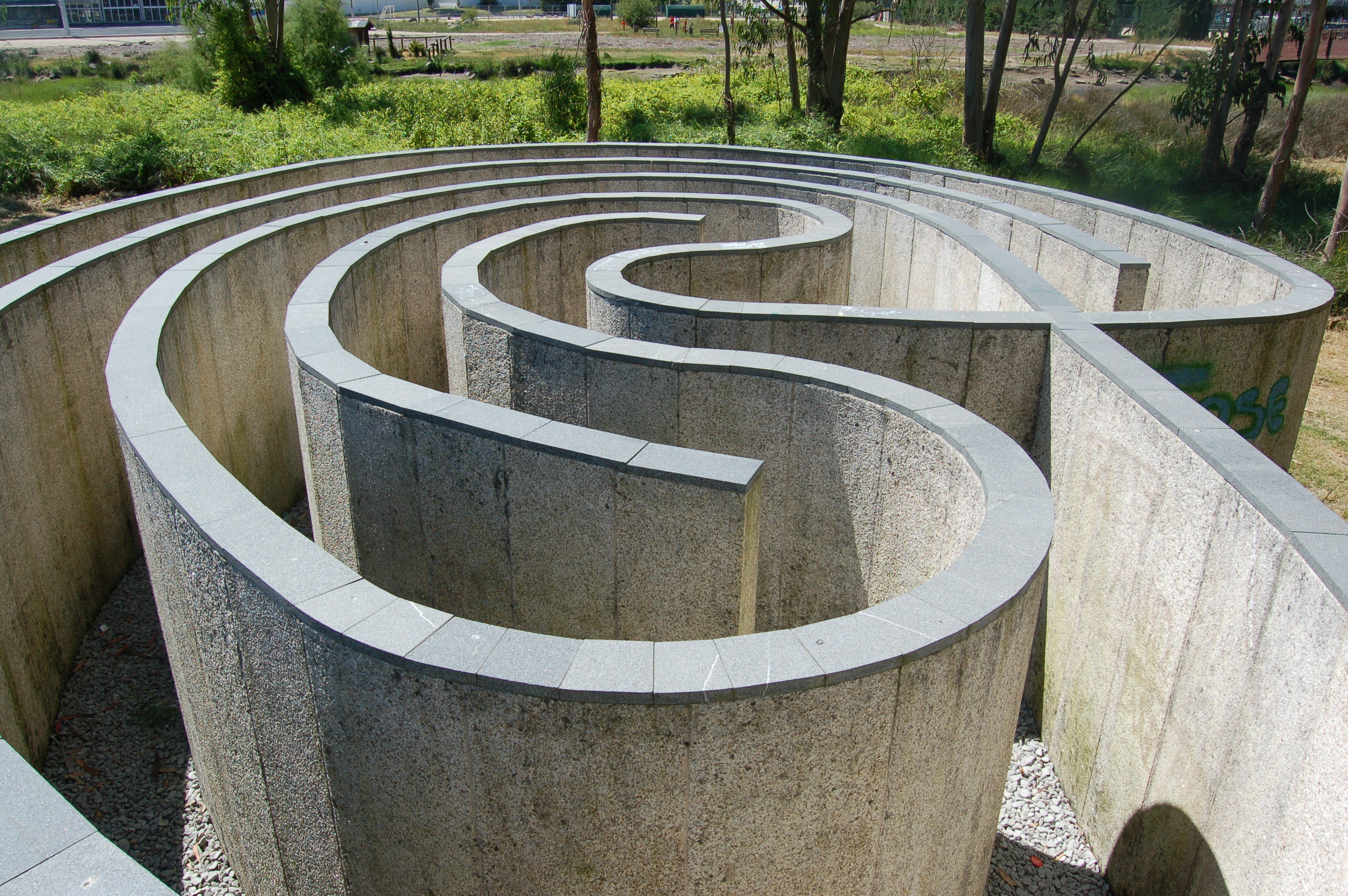
Labyrinth of Pontevedra, by Robert Morris

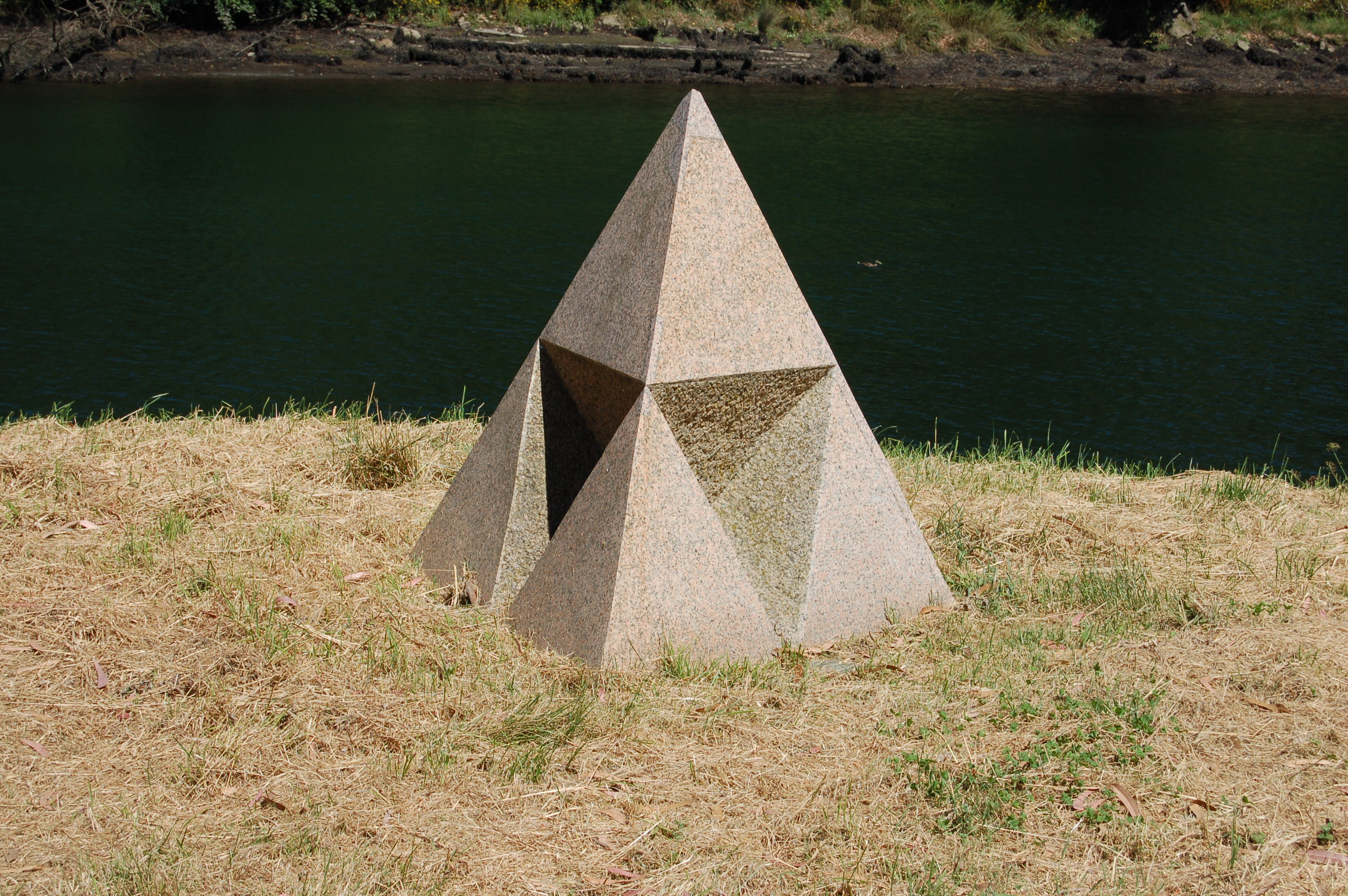
Pyramid, by Dan Graham

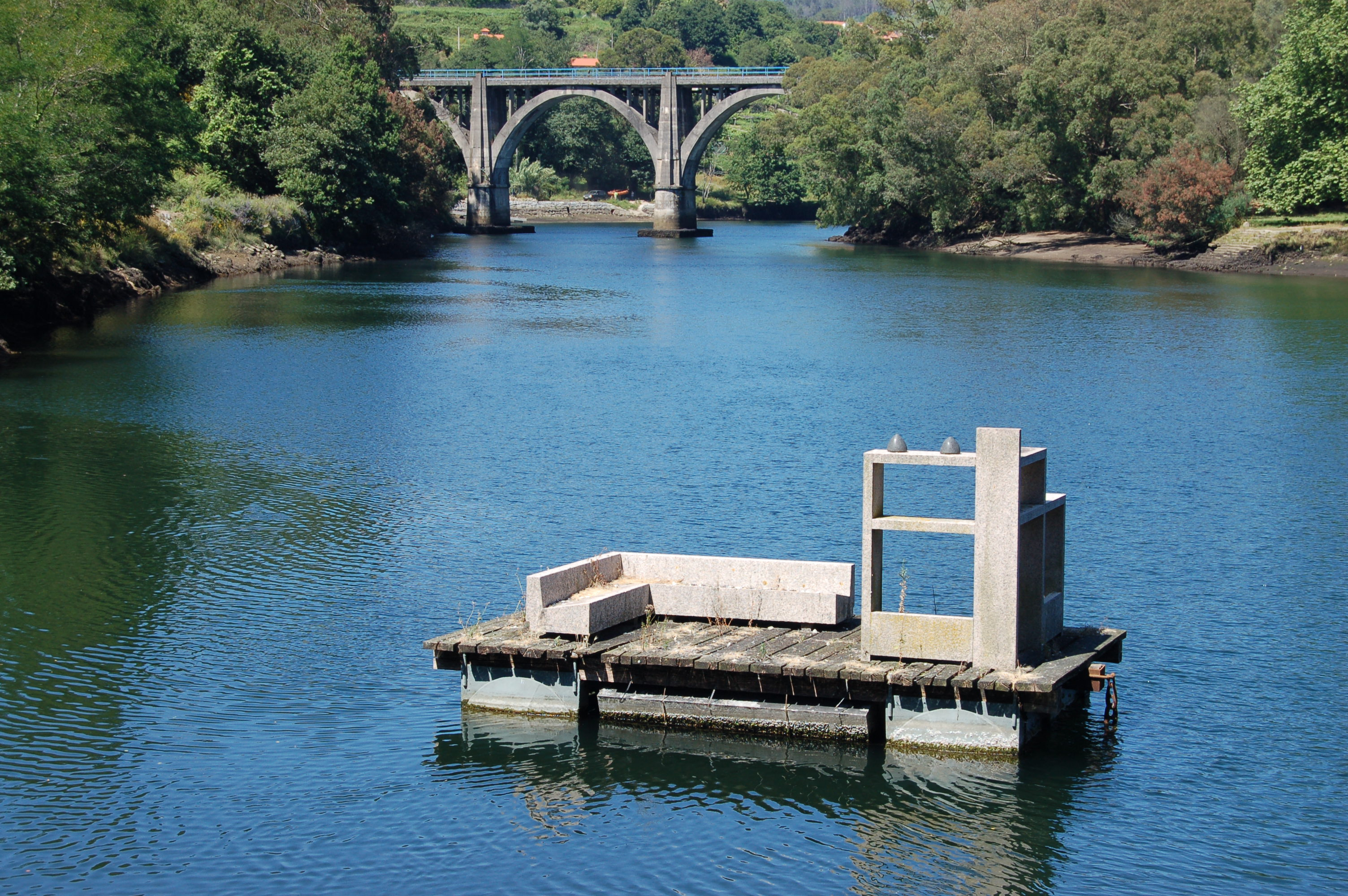
Saavedra, by Francisco Leiro, floating mussel farm

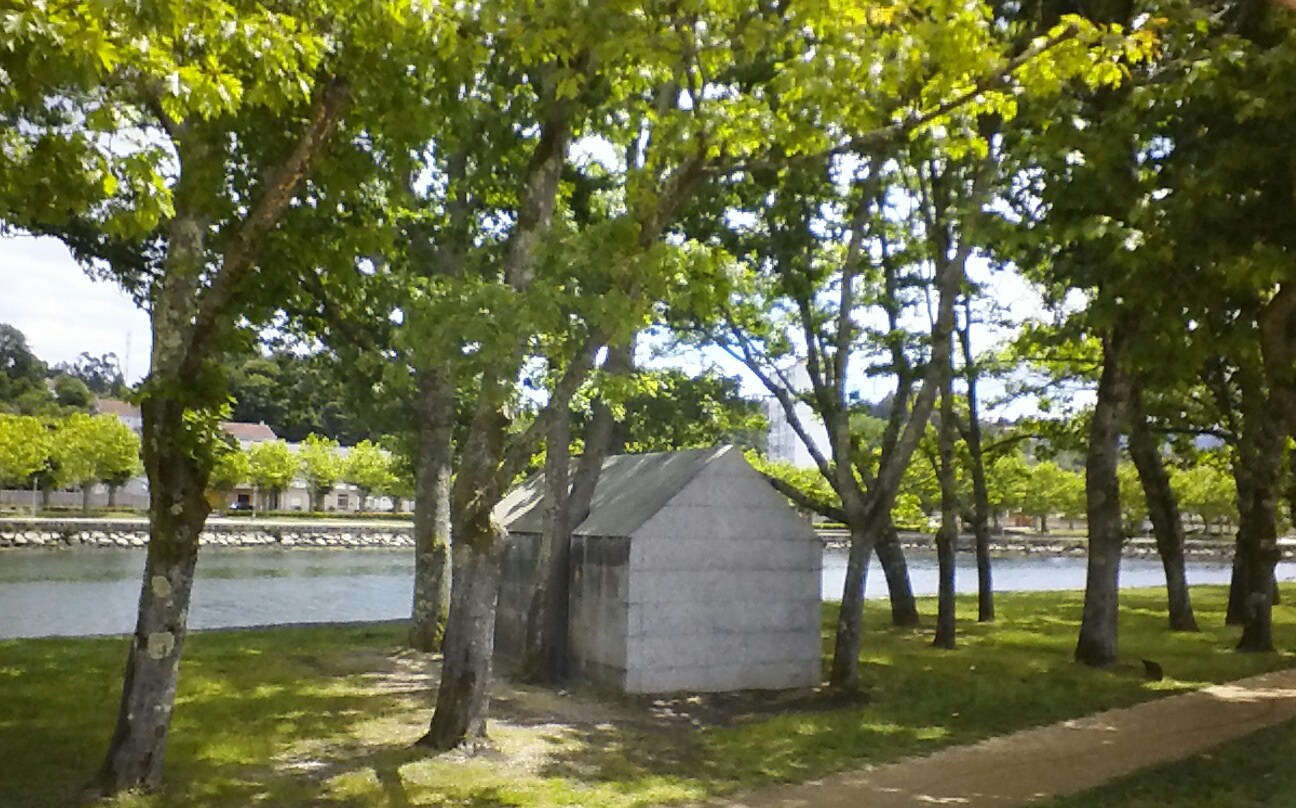
Small house of José Pedro Croft

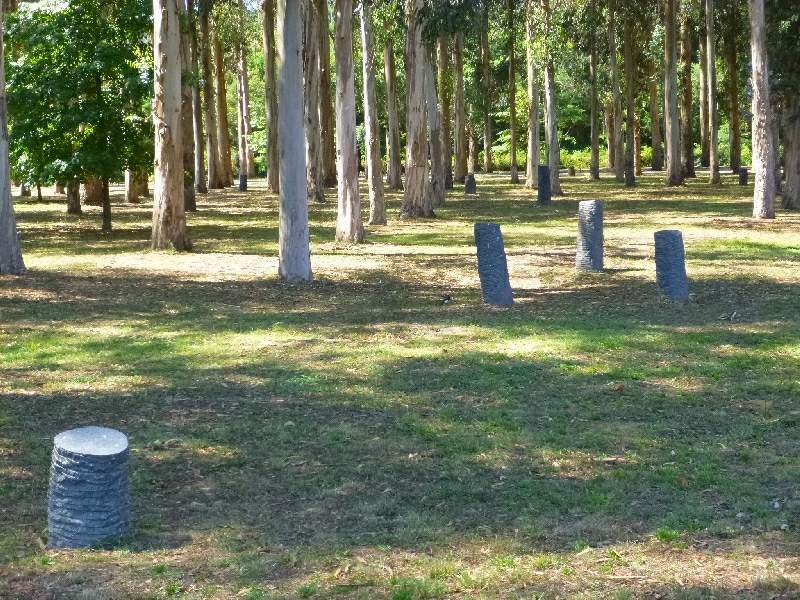
Lamed Vav / Os 36 xustos, by Fernando Casás.

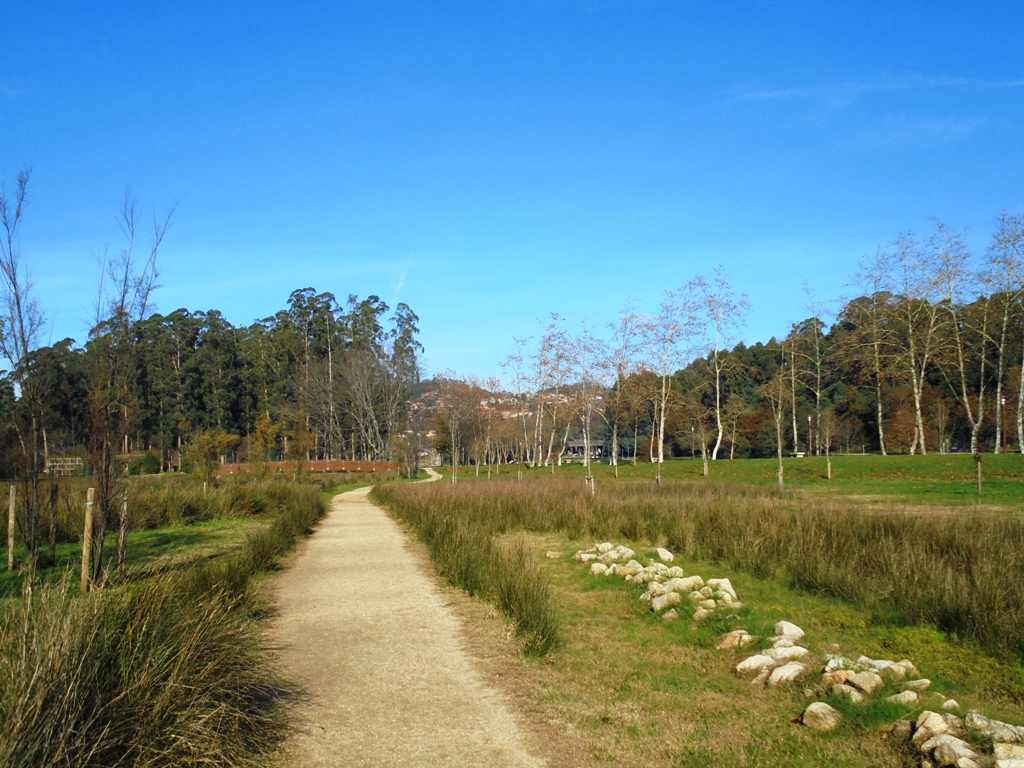
Pontevedra Line by Richard Long.

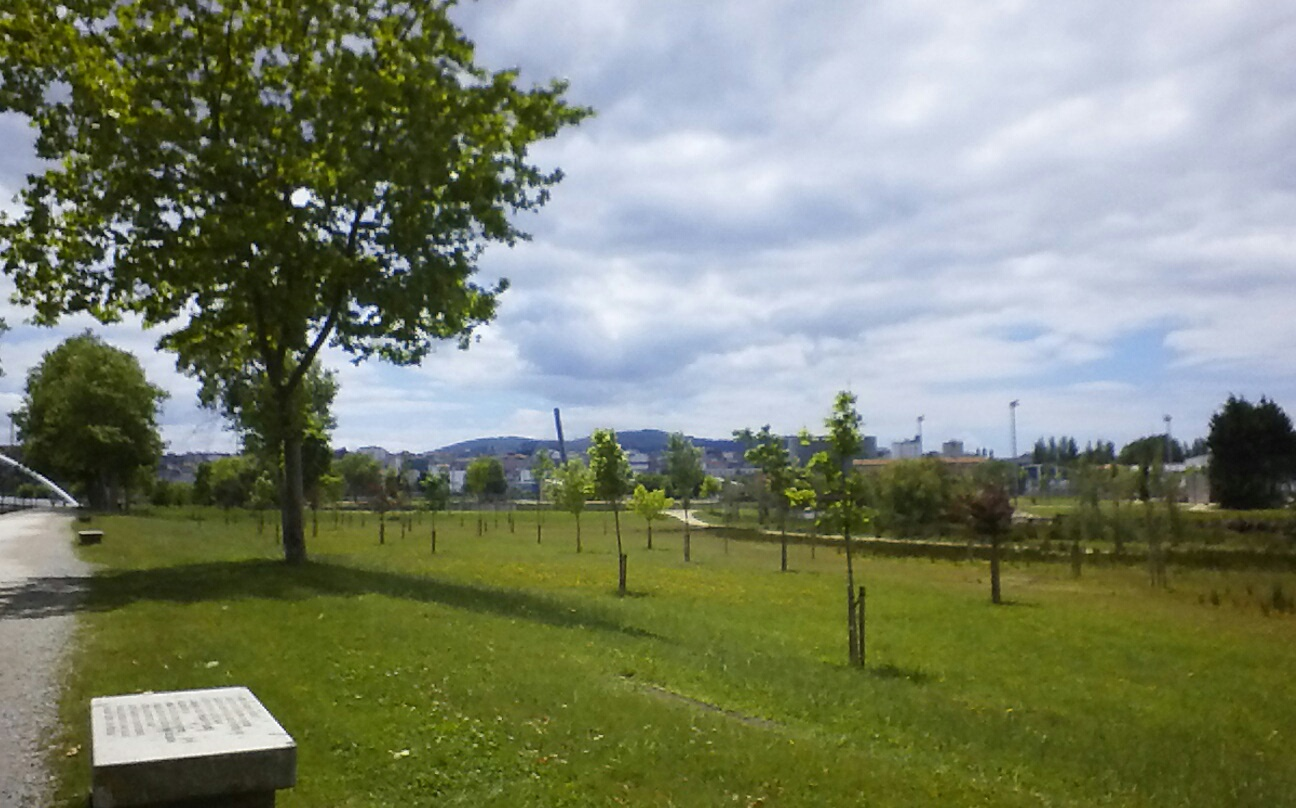
Granite benches by Jenny Holzer

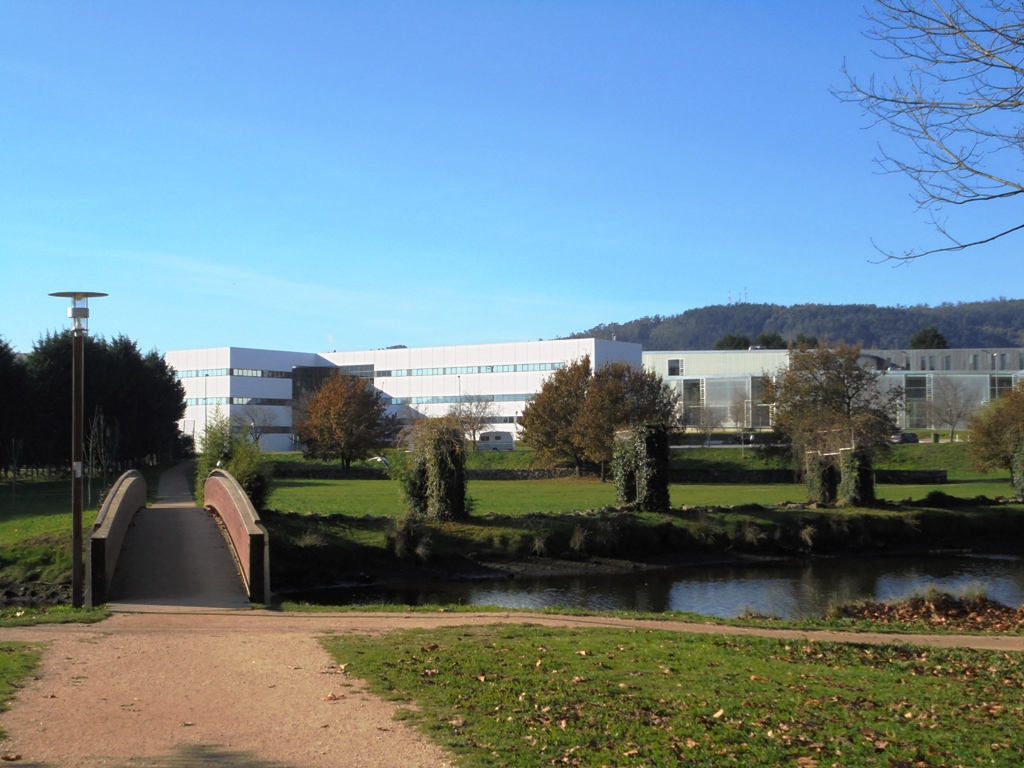
Folie by Anne and Patrick Poirier.

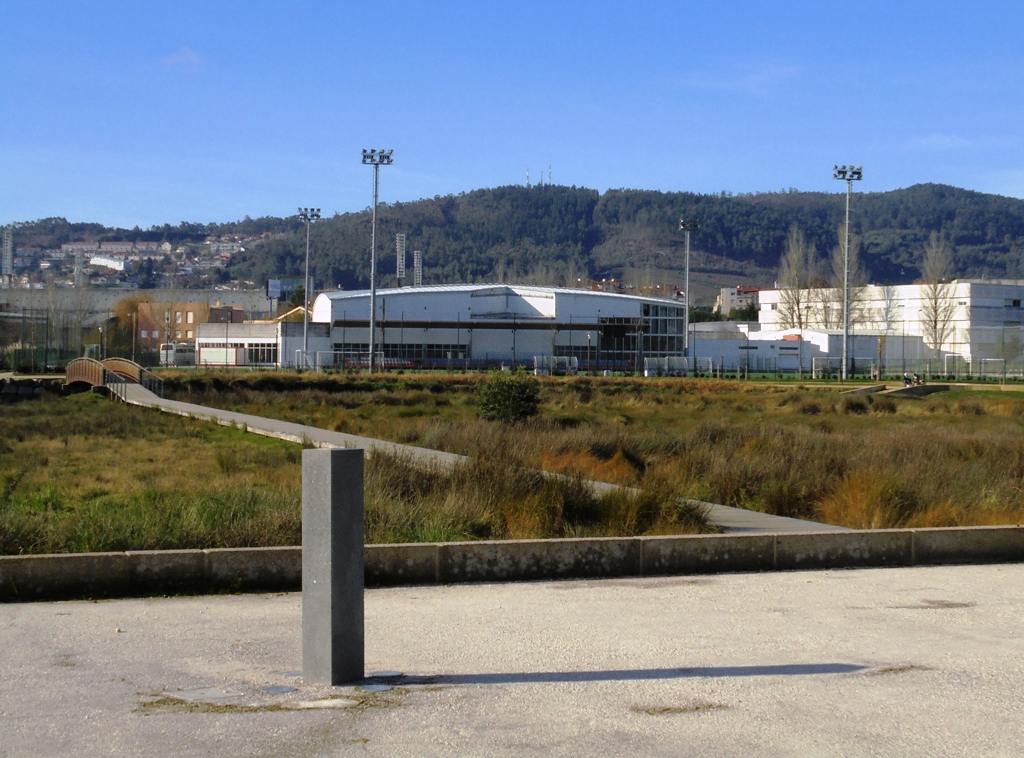
Shortened sky by Giovanni Anselmo

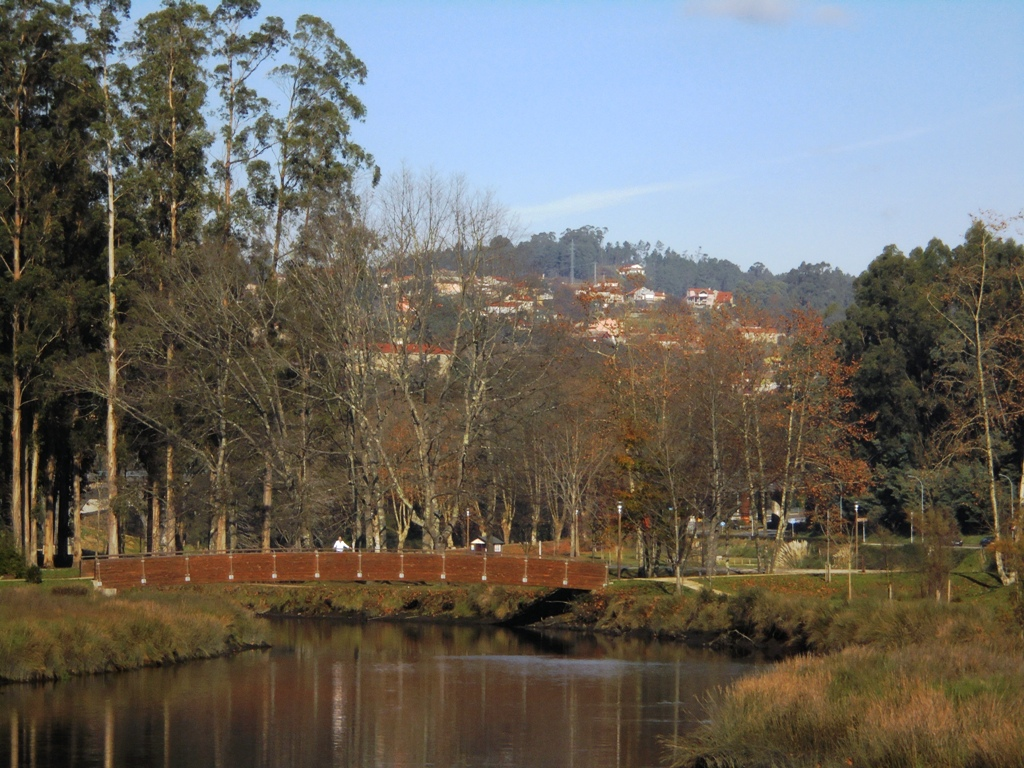
Bridges over the island canal

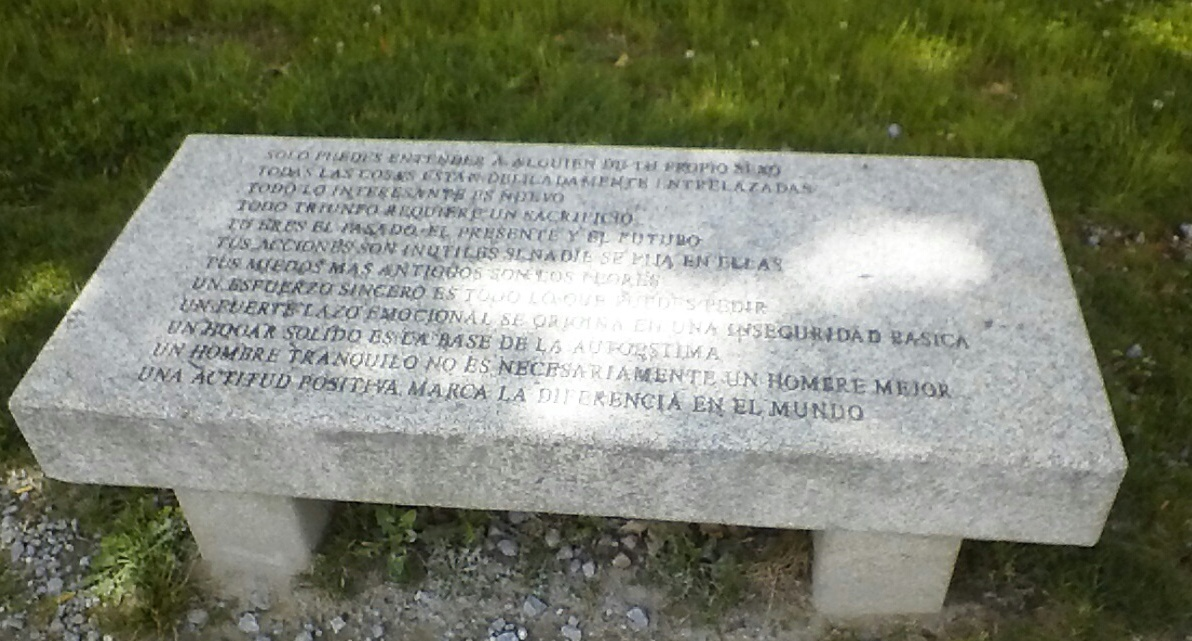
Bench by Jenny Holzer

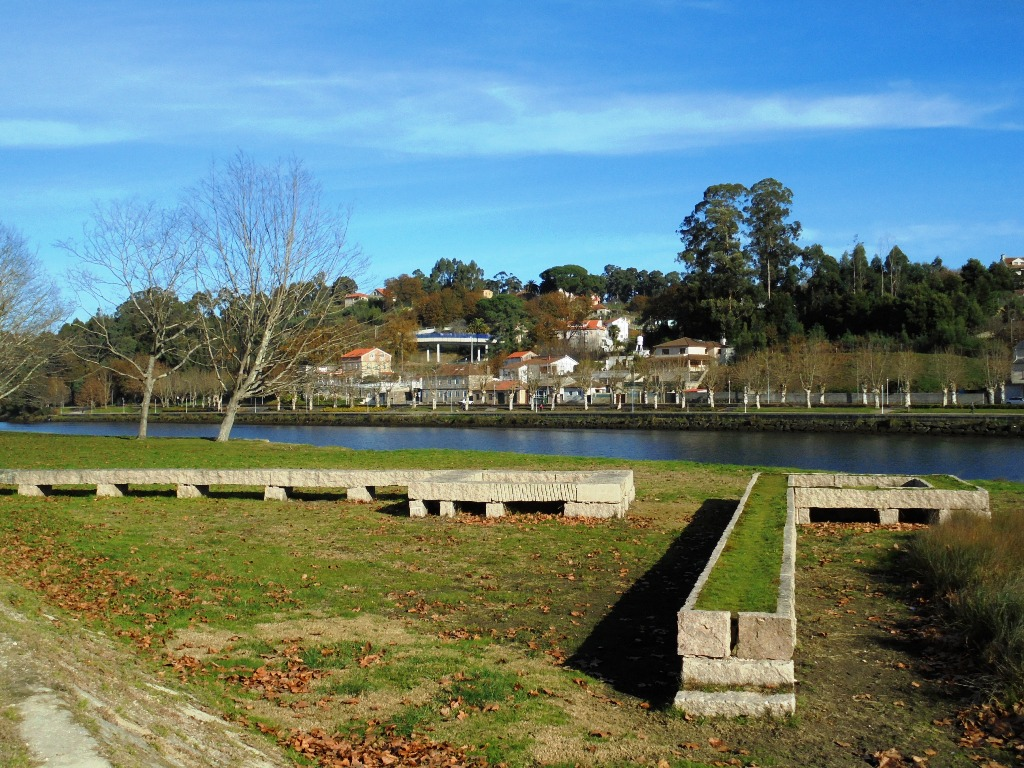
Reed path by Enrique Velasco

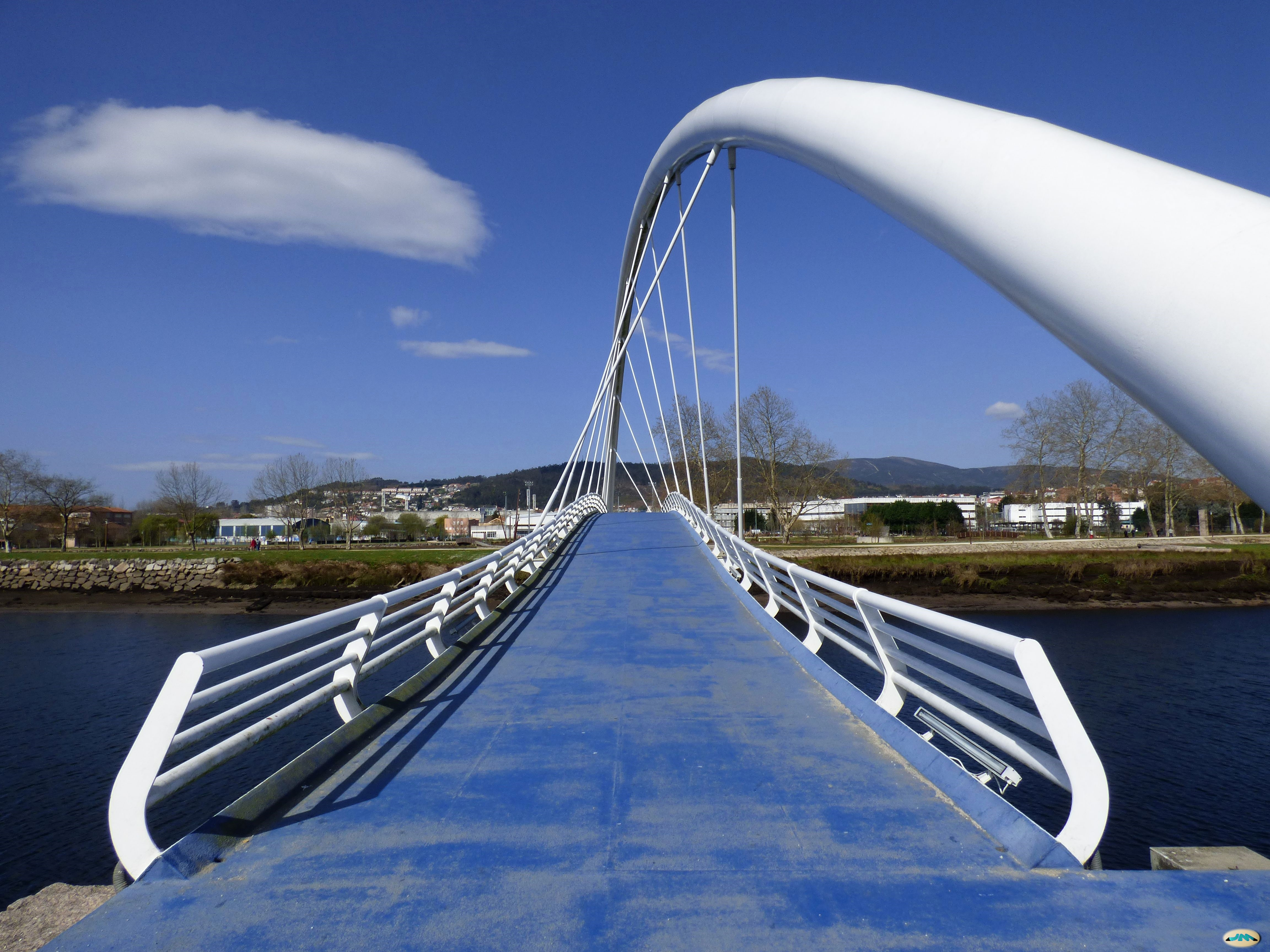
Pedestrian footbridge to access the island

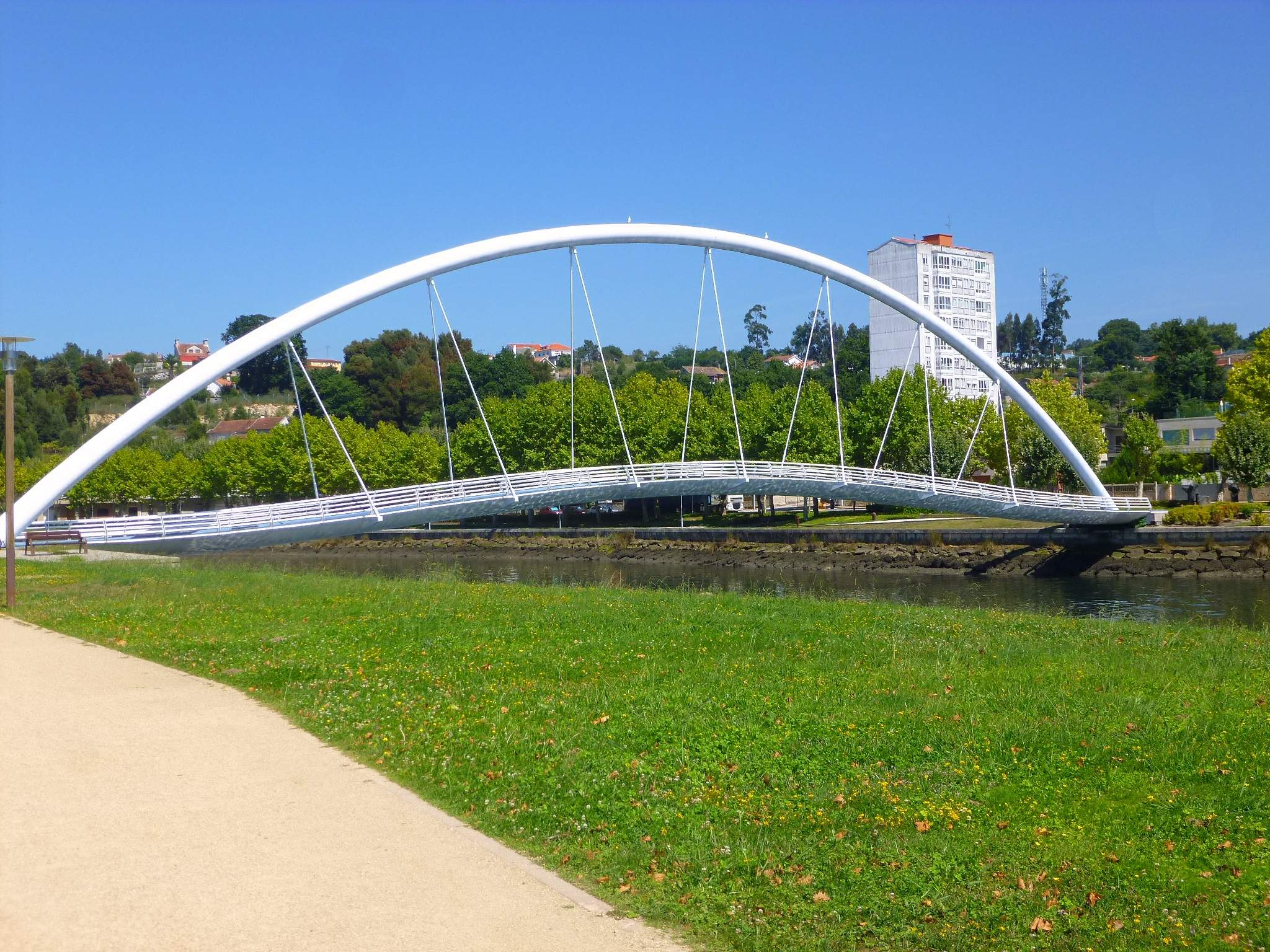
Pedestrian footbridge over the Lérez river

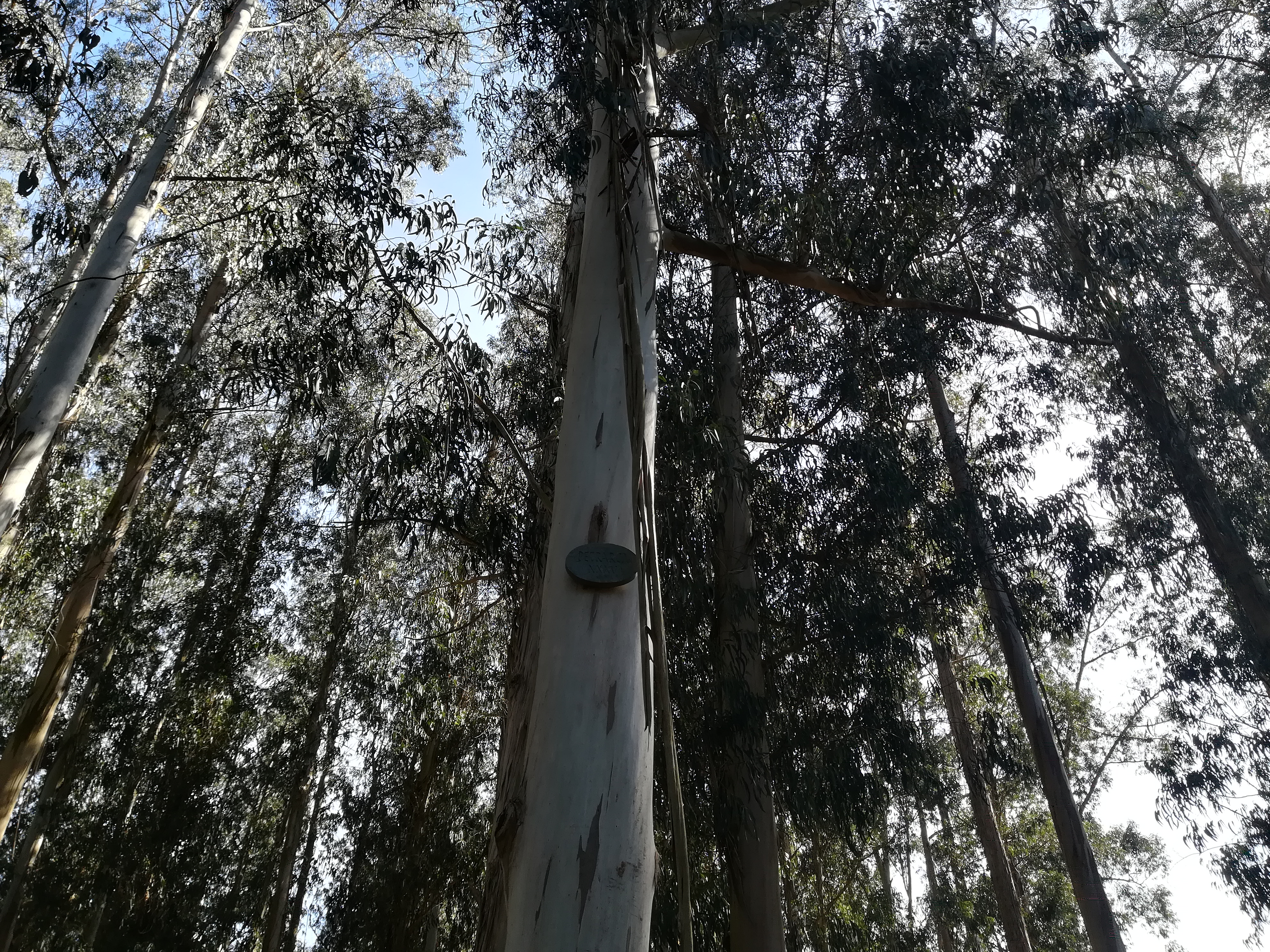
Petrarch by Ian Hamilton Finlay

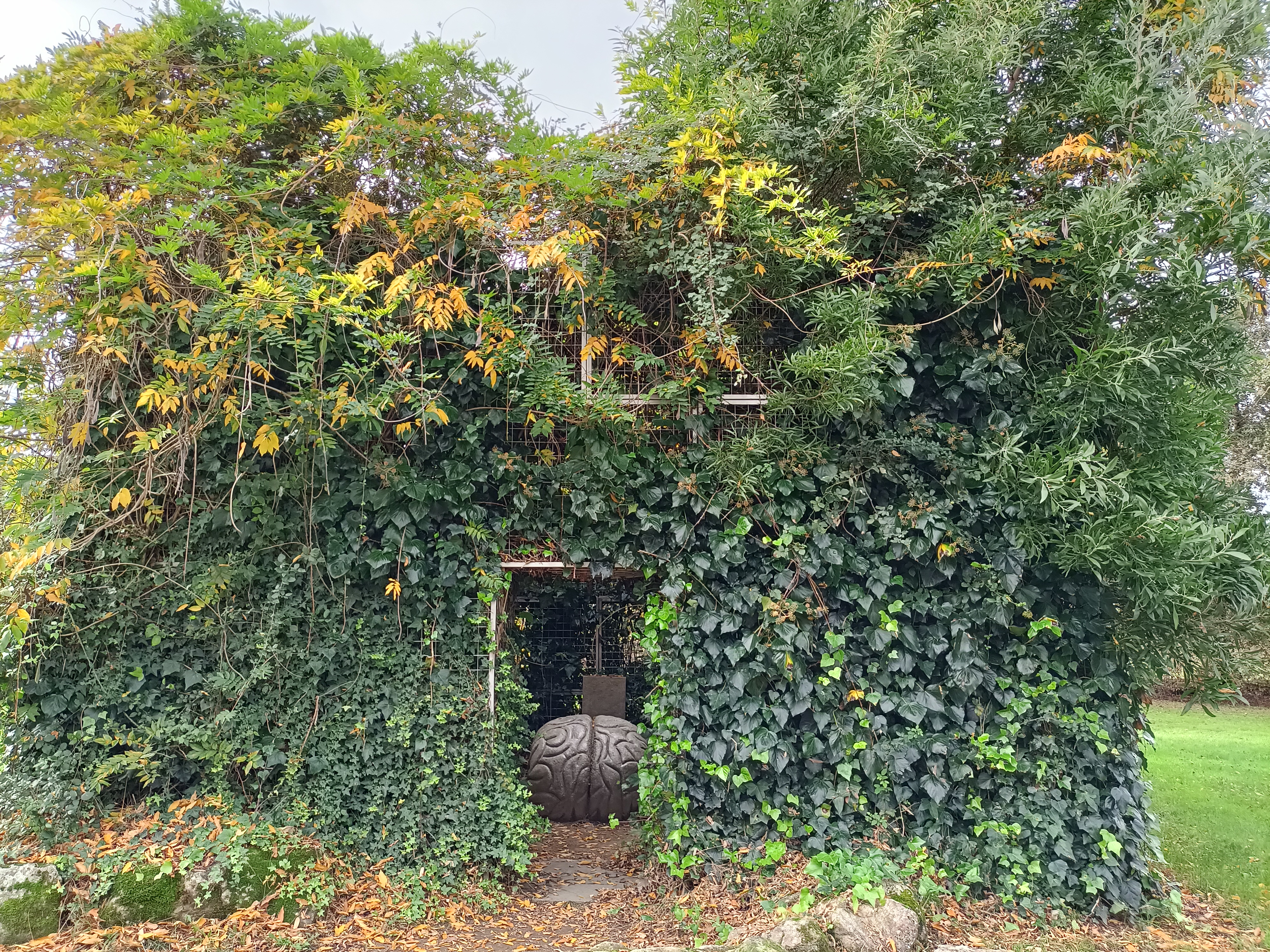
Folie by Anne and Patrick Poirier, Hortus conclusus.

== See also ==
- Land art
- Paseo Marítimo de Pontevedra

== Bibliography ==
- Aganzo, Carlos (2010). Pontevedra. Ciudades con encanto (in Spanish). Madrid: El País-Aguilar. pp. 107–108. ISBN 978-8403509344.
- Castro Fernández, Xosé Antón (2003). Illa das Esculturas.Pontevedra (in Galician). Pontevedra: Députation de Pontevedra. ISBN 978-8484571636.
- Riveiro Tobío, Elvira (2008). Descubrir Pontevedra (in Spanish). Pontevedra: Edicións do Cumio. pp. 68–72. ISBN 9788482890852.
- The Island of Sculptures of Pontevedra: an integrated model of art and nature ( PDF ), doctoral thesis by Eva López Tarrío
