= Zweibrückenstraße 8 =

House in Munich, Germany

Coordinates: 48.1333°N 11.5830°E

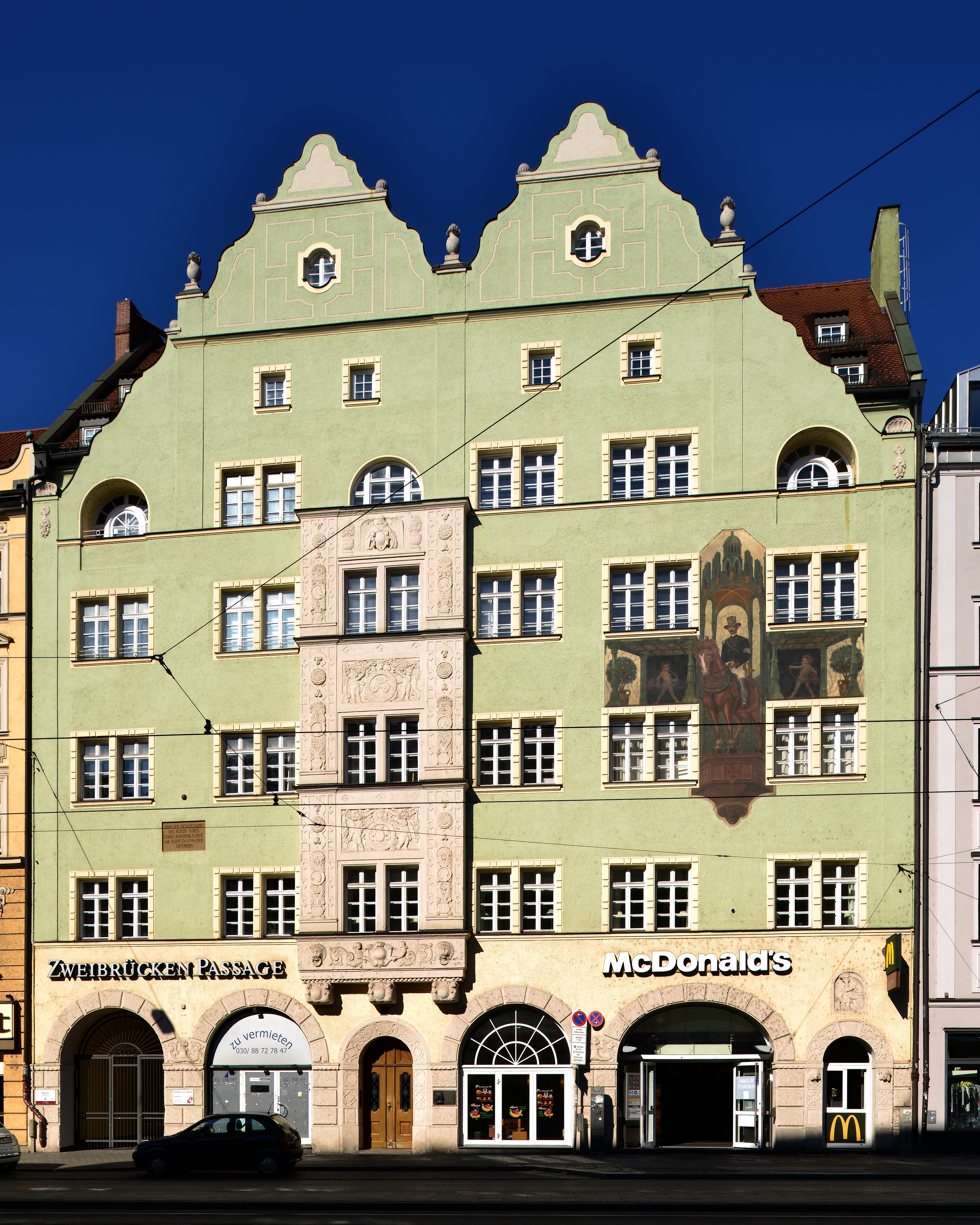
House Zweibrückenstraße 8 in Munich

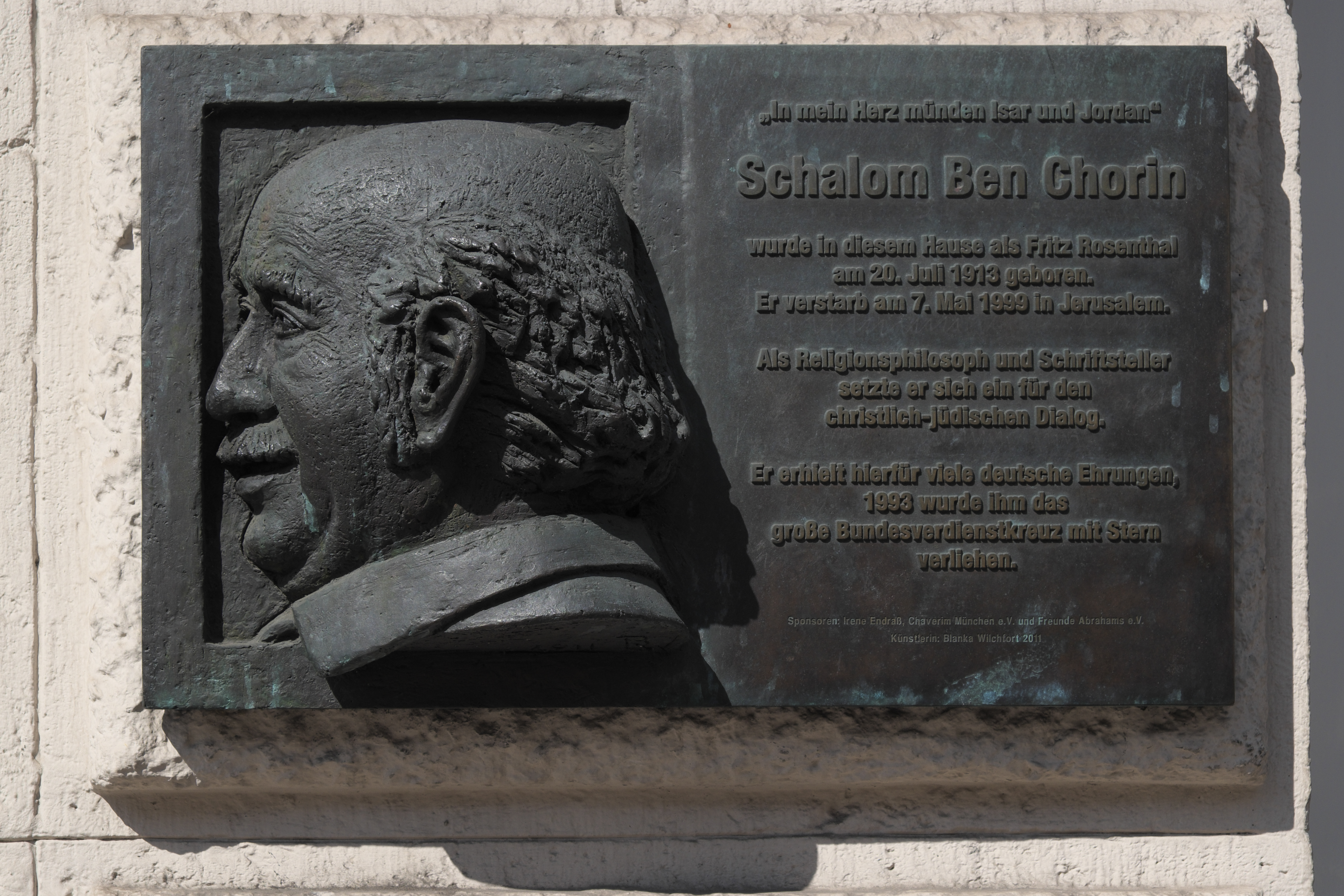
Commemorative plaque for Fritz Rosenthal

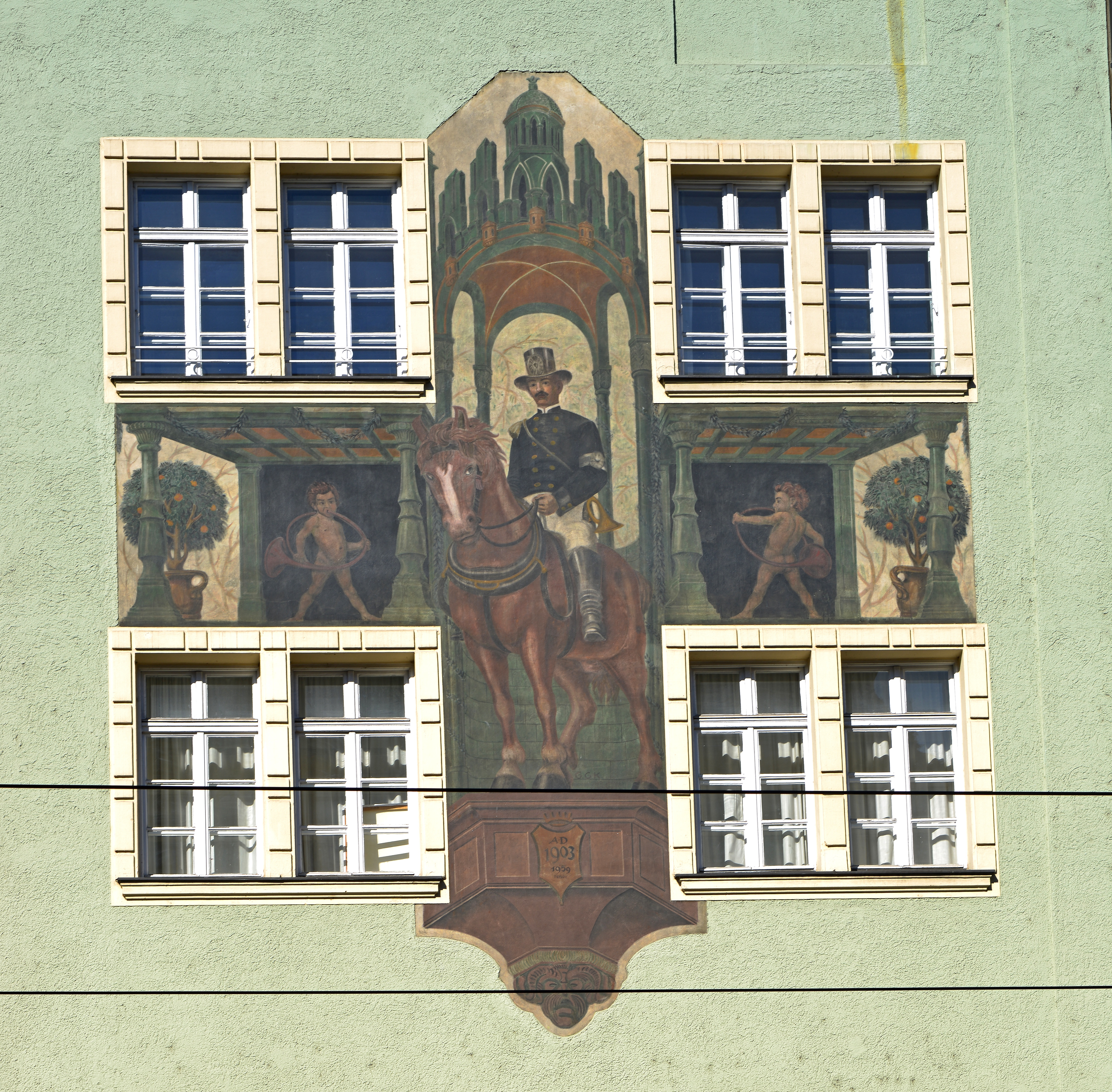
Wall painting as a souvenir of the Gasthaus Zum Postgarten

The house Zweibrückenstraße 8, in the district of Ludwigsvorstadt-Isarvorstadt in Munich, was built in 1903. The residential and commercial building is a historically protected architectural building (file number D-1-62-000-7788 in the list of historical buildings for Munich at the Bavarian State Office for Monument Protection).

== History and design ==
The building, in the style of the Neo-Renaissance, was designed by the architect Hans Hartl, who was also the client. The house, with double gable and sculpted Steinerker (stone oriel), has a mural painted on the northern side of the façade, referring to the former Restaurant zum Postgarten which was located on the ground floor. This small piece of art stretches from the second floor to the third floor between the two by two rows of windows. The drawing was done by Gottfried Gottlieb Klemm. The artwork is signed with G.G.K., with the year of completion of the building and with the year of restoration of the drawing. A rider on a horse, representing a mailman dressed in the costume of the time riding high on horseback between an espalier in the direction of the road can be seen. The drawing was made in 1903. The tavern found a new home in the new building and remained there until the year 1971. Another historical facade decoration is located between the first and second floor on the left wall side of the house. It is that of a cannonball that protrudes half its diameter out of the wall plaster. Below the ball is a commemorative plaque which describes in compact text of their history; the inscription on the board reads as follows: Nach der Beschiessung des roten Tores durch Marschall Conde am 8 Sept. D.J. 1796 hier gefunden (After the Red Gate shots by Marschall Conde at 8 Sept. D.J. 1796 found here). The cannonball found on the grounds of the Postgarten in 1796 was already embedded in the façade of the predecessor building of the old Postgarten.

The architect of the building, as a complete figure in a sitting pose, is incorporated above the right-hand window on the ground floor in a natural stone slab as a half-relief.

The house has survived the Second World War with almost no damage. As early as 1933, the original tops of the two gables, which were richer in design, were replaced by simpler ones. In 1984/85, the building was converted into a condominium.

== Shalom Ben-Chorin ==
A commemorative plaque recalls that Shalom Ben-Chorin, born Fritz Rosenthal, on July 20, 1913, saw the light of day in this house.

== Facade decoration on the ground floor ==
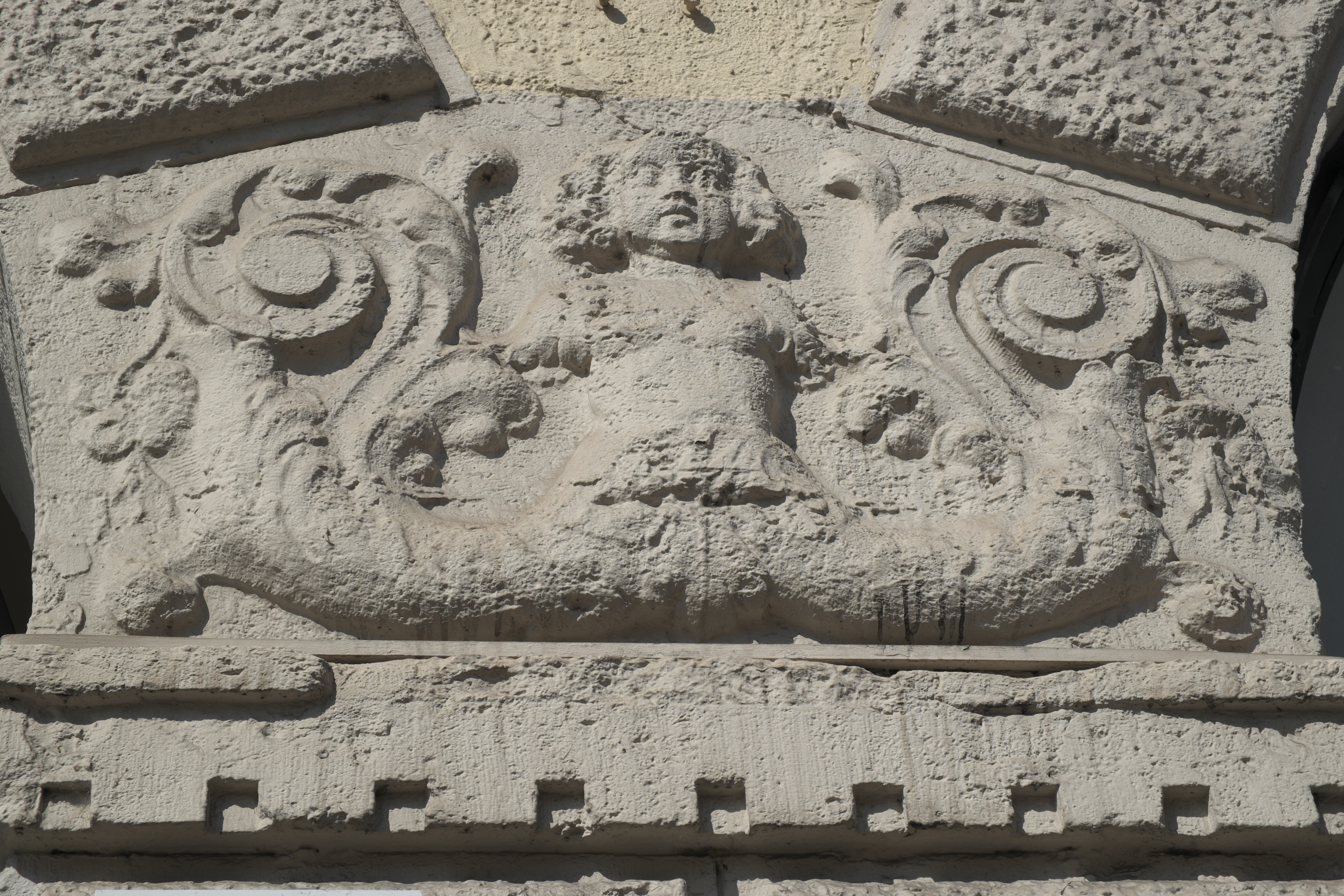

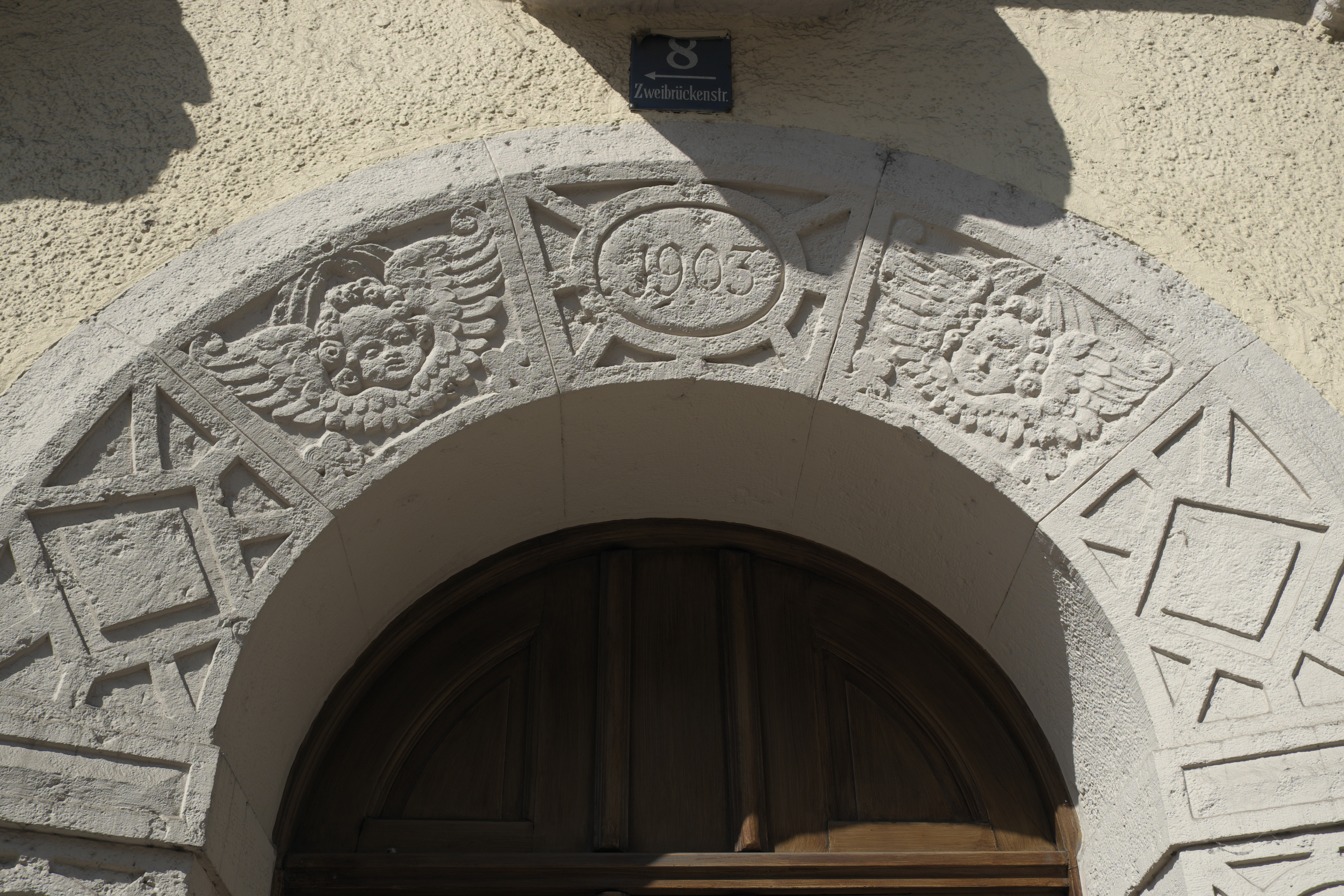

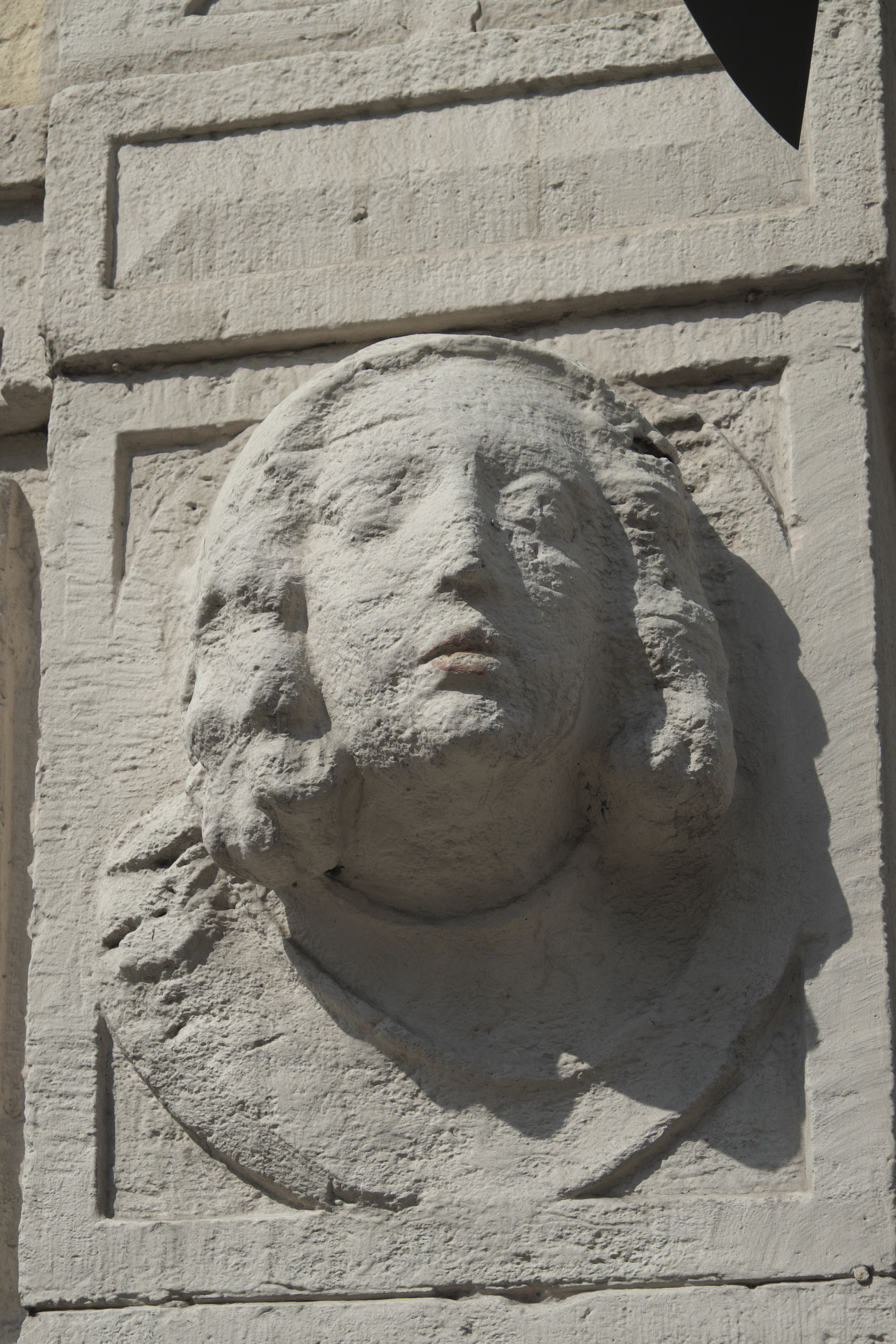

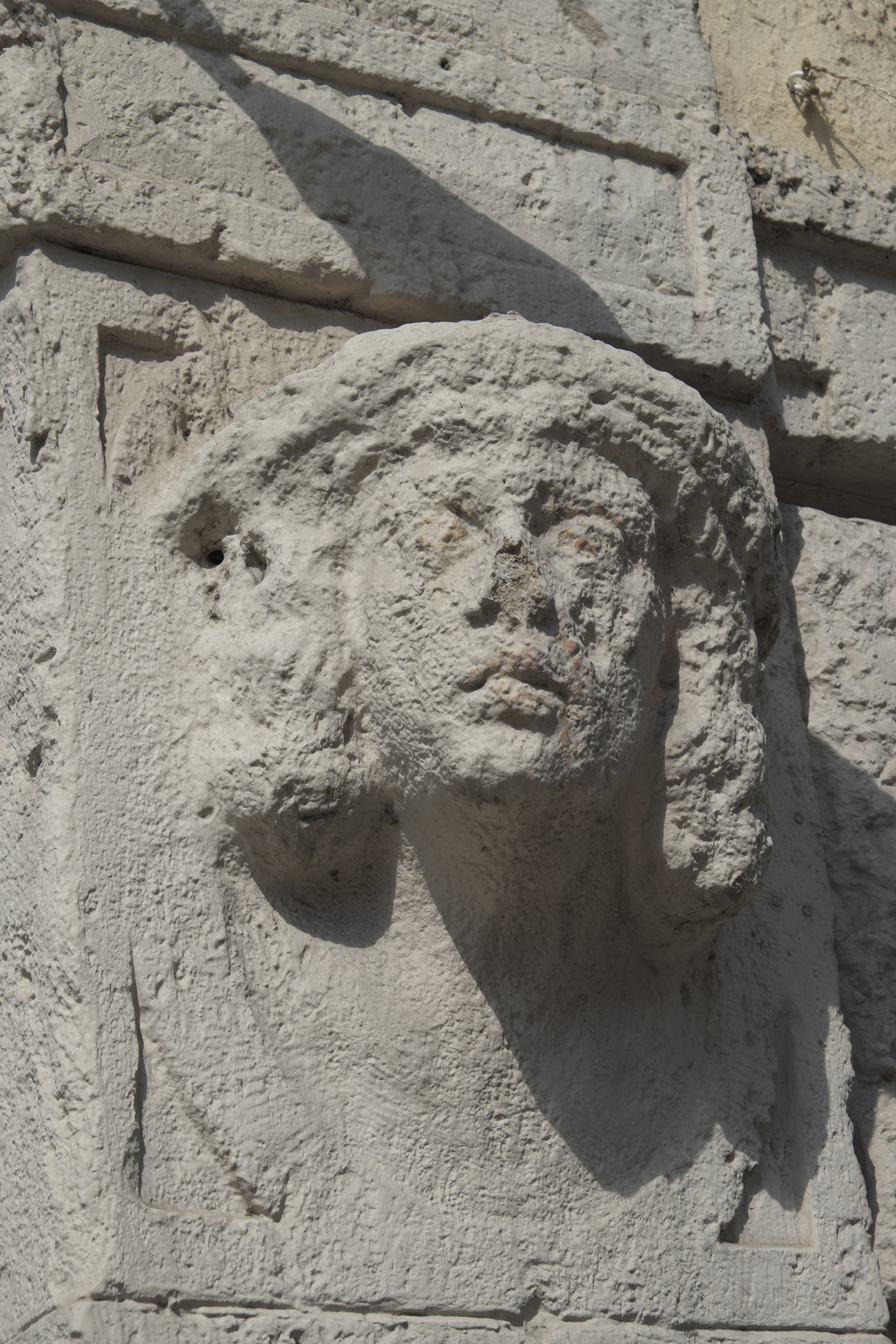
