= Anne and Patrick Poirier =

French artist duo

Anne and Patrick Anne Poirier
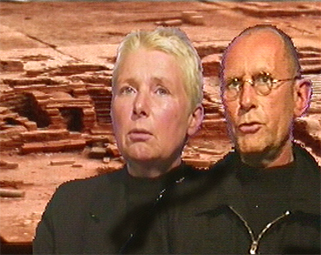
- Born: 1942; Marseille; Nantes
- Education: École nationale supérieure des arts décoratifs
- Known for: Visual Arts
- Awards: Villa Medici, Rome

Anne and Patrick Poirier (born 31 March 1942 in Marseille and 5 May 1942 in Nantes) are a French art duo.

From 1963 to 1966 they studied at the École nationale supérieure des arts décoratifs in Paris. After winning the Prix de Rome, they lived from 1969 to 1971 in the Villa Medici in Rome as fellows of the Académie de France à Rome. They currently split their time between Paris and Trevi.

== Work ==
Though they have worked in a variety of media, including photography, drawing, installation and monumental public sculpture, their oeuvre has always dealt with themes surrounding memory, archeology, ruins, memento mori, disintegration, loss and remembering. As they articulate it, "we believe that ignorance or the destruction of cultural memory brings in its wake every sort of oblivion, falsehood and excess and that we must, with all the modest means at our disposal, oppose this generalized amnesia and destruction."

Their work is featured in international collections in the United States and Europe, including the Pérez Art Museum Miami, Florida; and the Corning Museum of Glass, New York.
