= David Amor =

Spanish comedian and actor

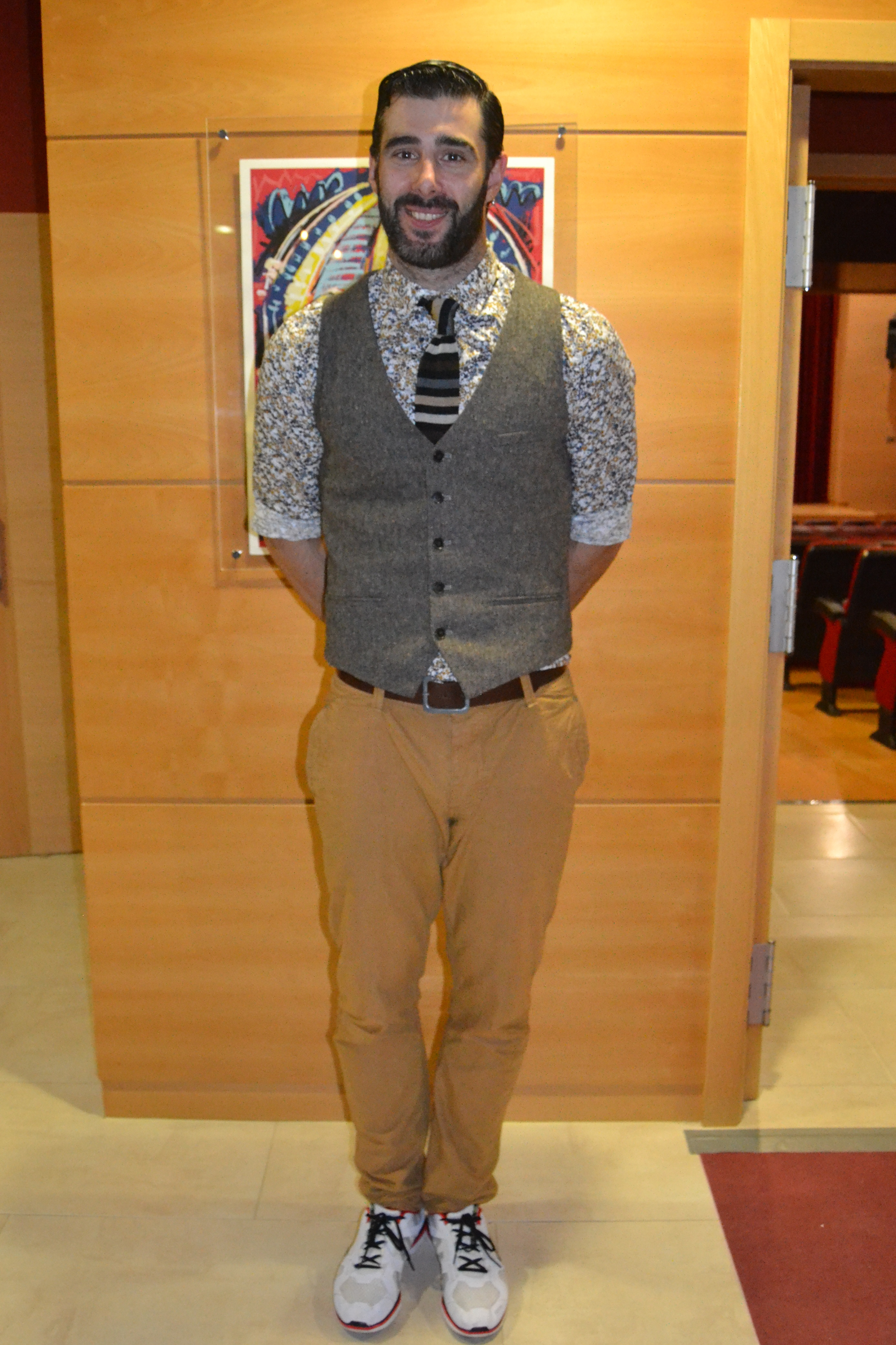
- David Amor in 2014.
- Born: 12 April 1980 (age 45); Salceda de Caselas, Galicia, Spain
- Education: Faculty of Education and Sports Sciences, Pontevedra Campus
- Occupation(s): Comedian, actor
- Height: 1.93 m (6 ft 4 in)

David López Veleiro (born 12 April 1980), known by his stage name David Amor, is a Spanish actor, comedian, television presenter, former handball player and model.

He is best known for his appearances on Antena 3's El club del chiste, as well as the TV talent show Tu cara me suena and the television series Gym Tony.

== Life and career ==
Born on 12 April 1980, he had a quiet childhood, even though he was unable to play football from an early age. At the age of 14, he decided to try his hand at handball, a sport in which he quickly excelled, becoming a member of the national youth and junior teams. He became world champion, but an injury put an end to his promising career at the height of his success.

Faced with this situation, he began to explore other professional areas, working as a pizza delivery boy and waiter, while studying for a degree in physical activity and sports science at the Faculty of Education and Sports Sciences in Pontevedra. It was during this time that he met the actress María Castro, an encounter that would change his life. Thanks to her, he joined a modeling agency, where he discovered and cultivated his passion for show business.

In 2000, he auditioned for TVG's ‘O rei da comedia’ programme, where he met Fran Hermida, who invited him to perform monologues in local bars. His talent enabled him to make his television debut on TVG's ‘Supermartes’. At the same time, he began appearing and playing small roles in a number of films.

His television career took off when he began presenting the programme ‘O pogramón’, and gained even more notoriety with ‘Supermaster’, a popular summer karaoke show in Galicia. Just as his success on television seemed assured, handball came knocking on his door again. Sociedad Deportiva Teucro signed him up and he decided to resume his sporting career. However, a year later he left handball once again to concentrate on other projects.

It was around this time that Globomedia contacted him for an audition. After several auditions, he was finally selected to take part in the comedy programme ‘El club del chiste’ on Antena 3, which began recording in 2010. There he also presented a show combining humour and jazz music, thus broadening his artistic versatility.

As well as playing Tito, the muscle-bound coach, in the comedy ‘Gym Tony’ broadcast on the Cuatro channel, he also plays the lead role in a new TVG series called ‘Augas Quentes’, which began broadcasting in October 2016.

In 2018 he collaborated with Omar Rabuñal and David Noya in the film Los Amigos – La Pinícula, by Omar Rabuñal. Between July 2018 and 2020, he collaborated on the programme Zapeando on La Sexta.
