= Higher School of Mining Engineering =

Spanish university campus

School of Mining Engineering
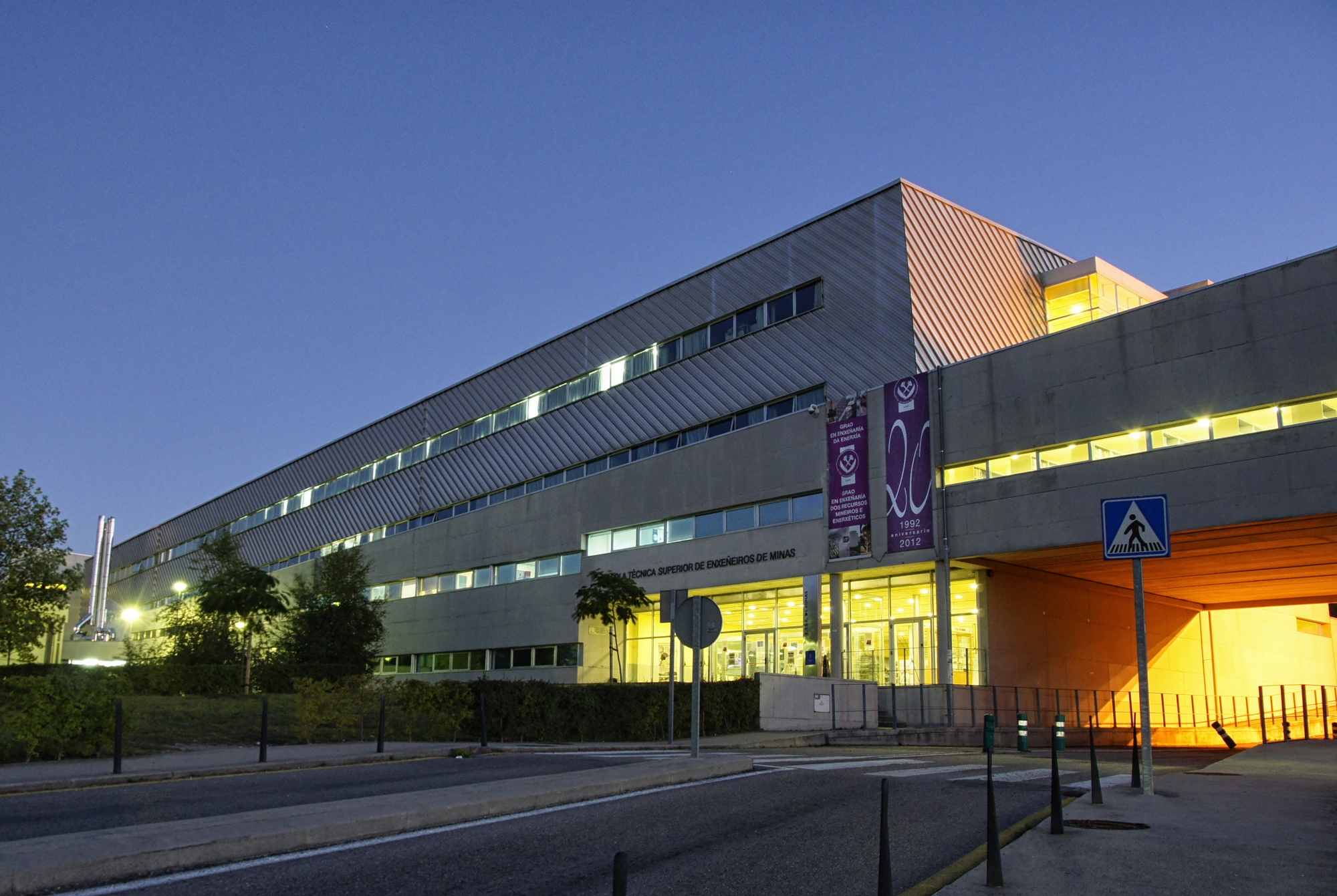
- Type: Public
- Established: 1992
- Parent institution: University of Vigo
- Director: Benito Vázquez Dorrío
- Academic staff: 55
- Students: 517
- Location: Rúa Maxwell, Campus Lagoas-Marcosende 36310, Vigo, (Pontevedra), Spain; 42°25′54.3″N 8°41′18.4″W
- Campus: Lagoas-Marcosende
- Website: Uvigo.es

The Higher School of Mining Engineering (HSME) is a school located on the campus of the University of Vigo in Galicia, Spain. It offers undergraduate education as well as postgraduate courses for master's and doctoral degrees in mining engineering.

== History ==
The study of mining engineering in Spain dates back to 1778, and focuses on locating and extracting natural and energy resources. This field of study is symbolized in the school logo by a hammer, a mallet, a palm, and laurel leaves. The depiction represents natural resource exploitation, environmental engineering, material craft, energy extraction, and civil works. HSME opened at the University of Vigo in 1992. At the time of founding, it was one of only four schools dedicated to mining engineering in Spain, and continues to be the only one of its kind in Galicia. Specializations include energy, materials, environmental studies, and mining.

After the academic year 2010/11, the school updated its study plan in accordance with the Bologna Process (RD 1393/2007 (modificado por RD 861/2010) for both undergraduate and postgraduate studies.

== Studies ==
=== Undergraduate ===
- Degree in Mining and Energetic Resources Engineering
- Degree in Energy Engineering

=== Postgraduate ===
- Master in Mining Engineering

== Facilities ==
The current mining engineering building was recently renovated (inaugurated in 2005), in order to share central services such as the library, administration offices, and dining areas. The building is in the industrial style, with an area of approximately 9,000 metres (30,000 ft).

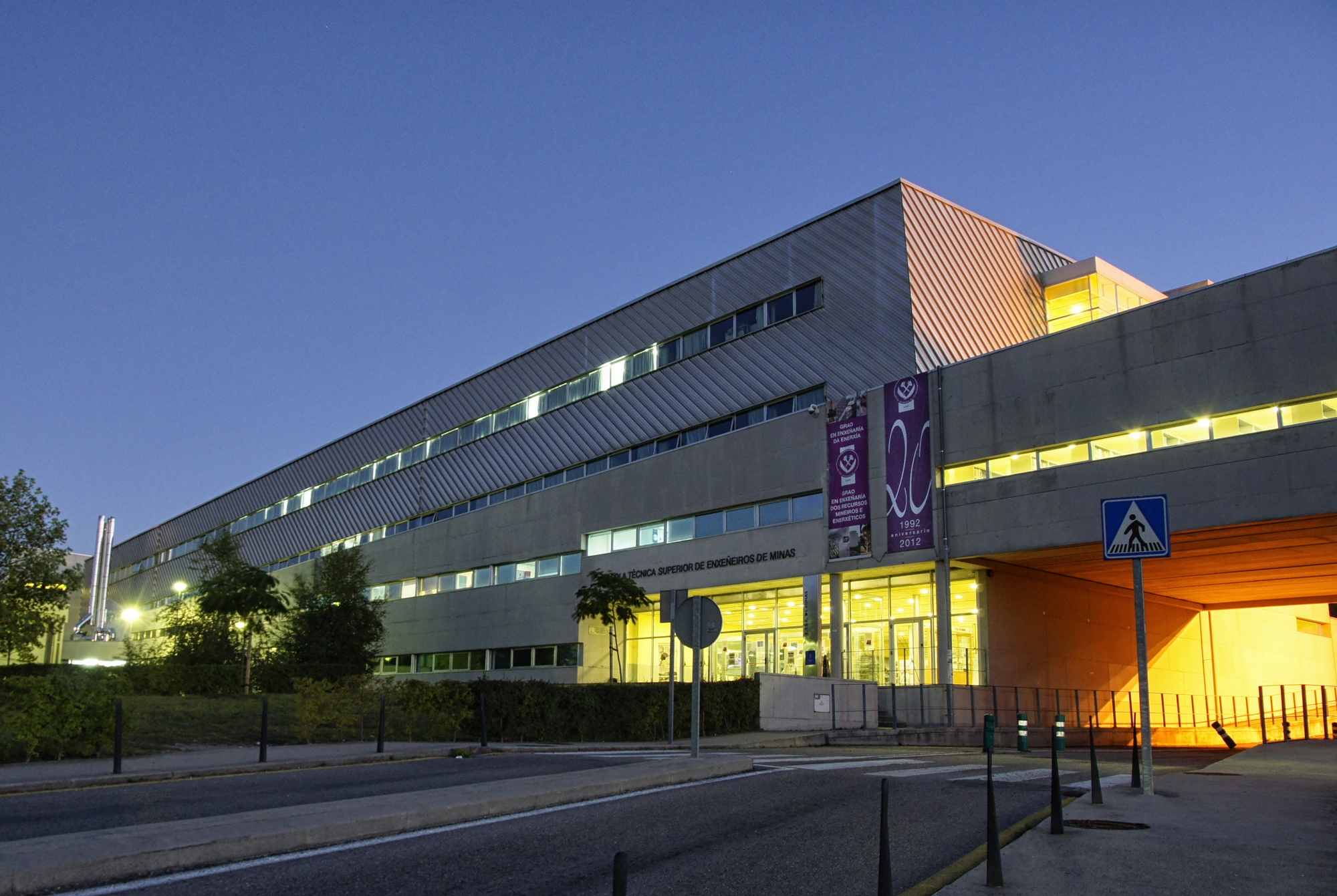
Vista nocturna

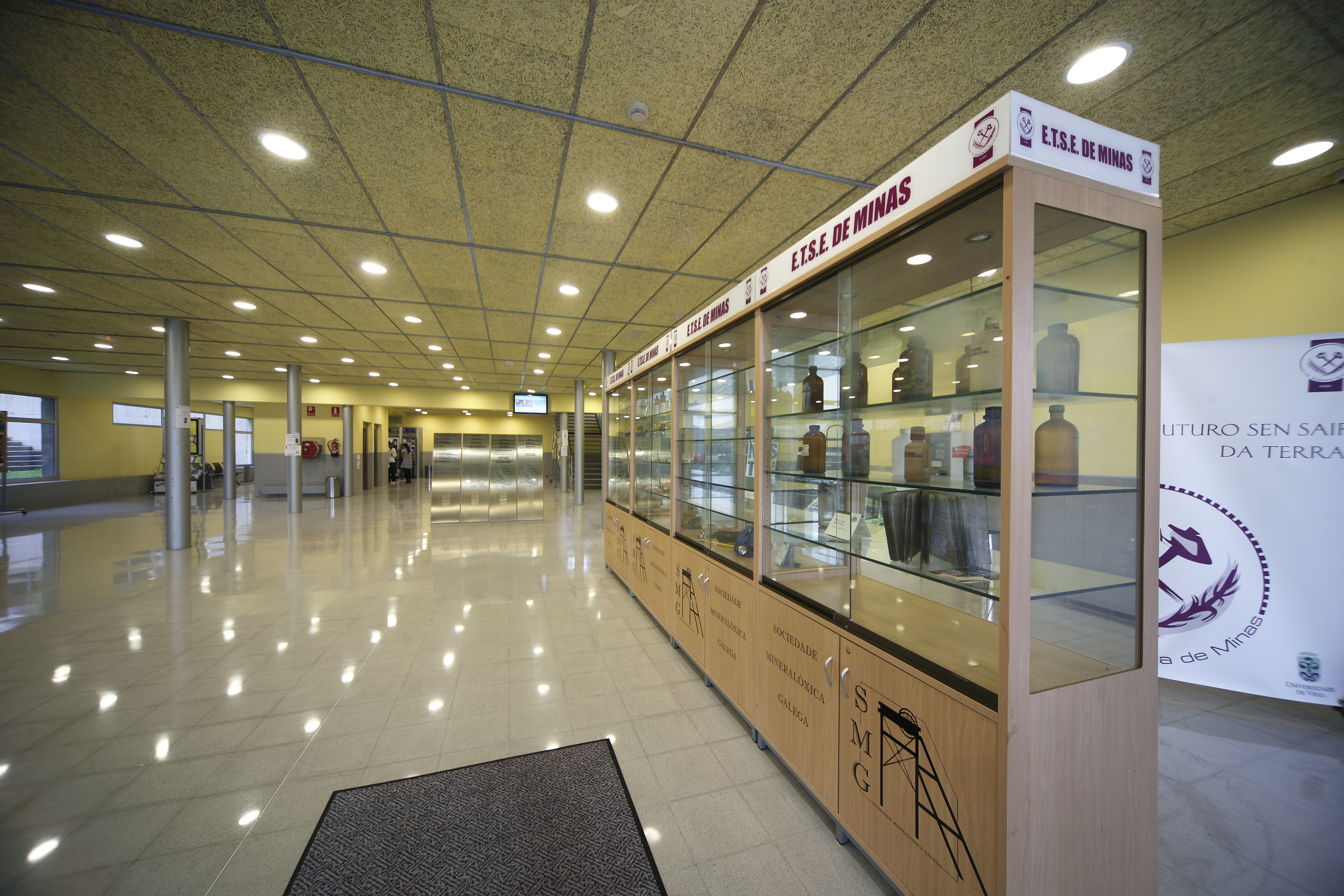
Hall

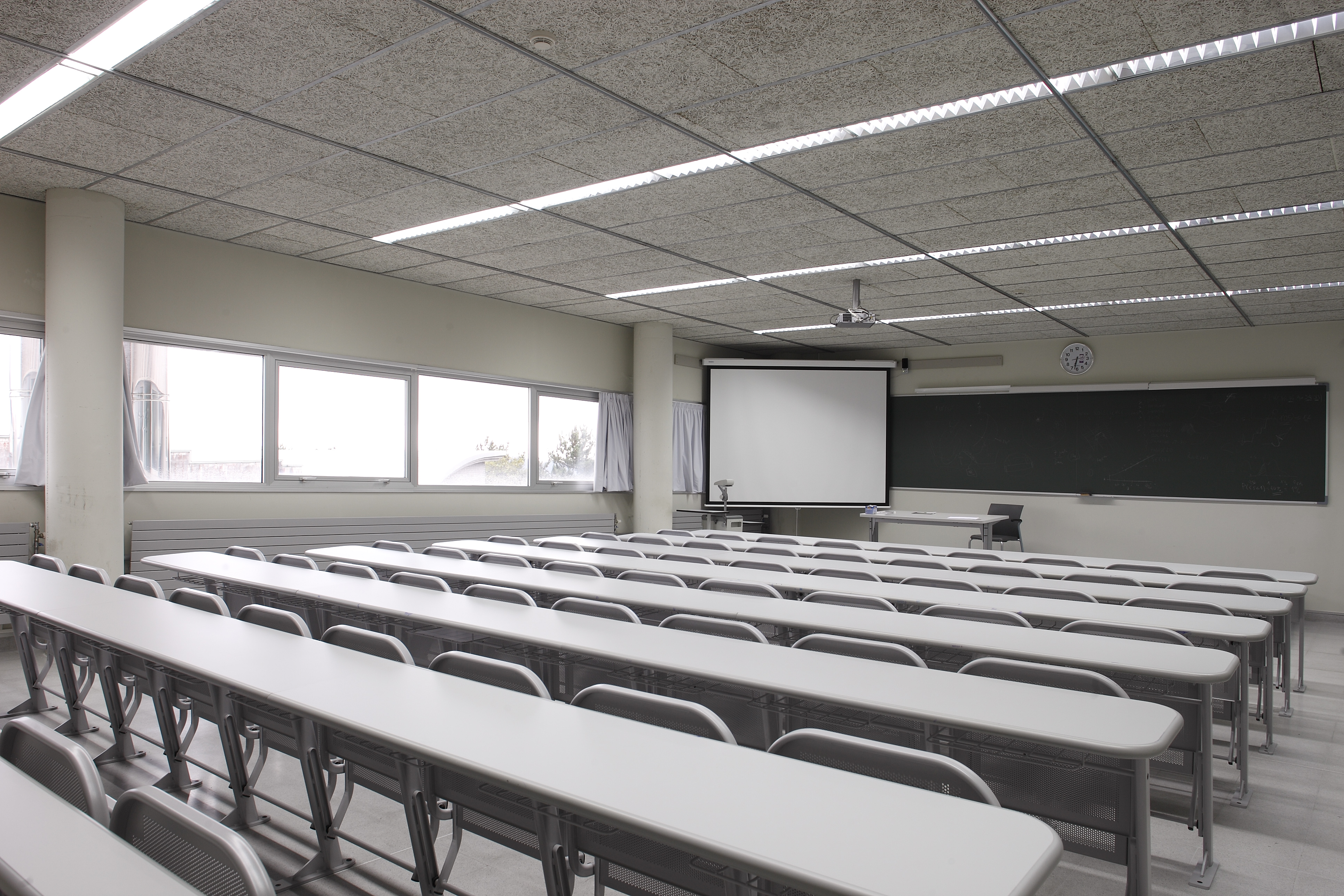
Aula

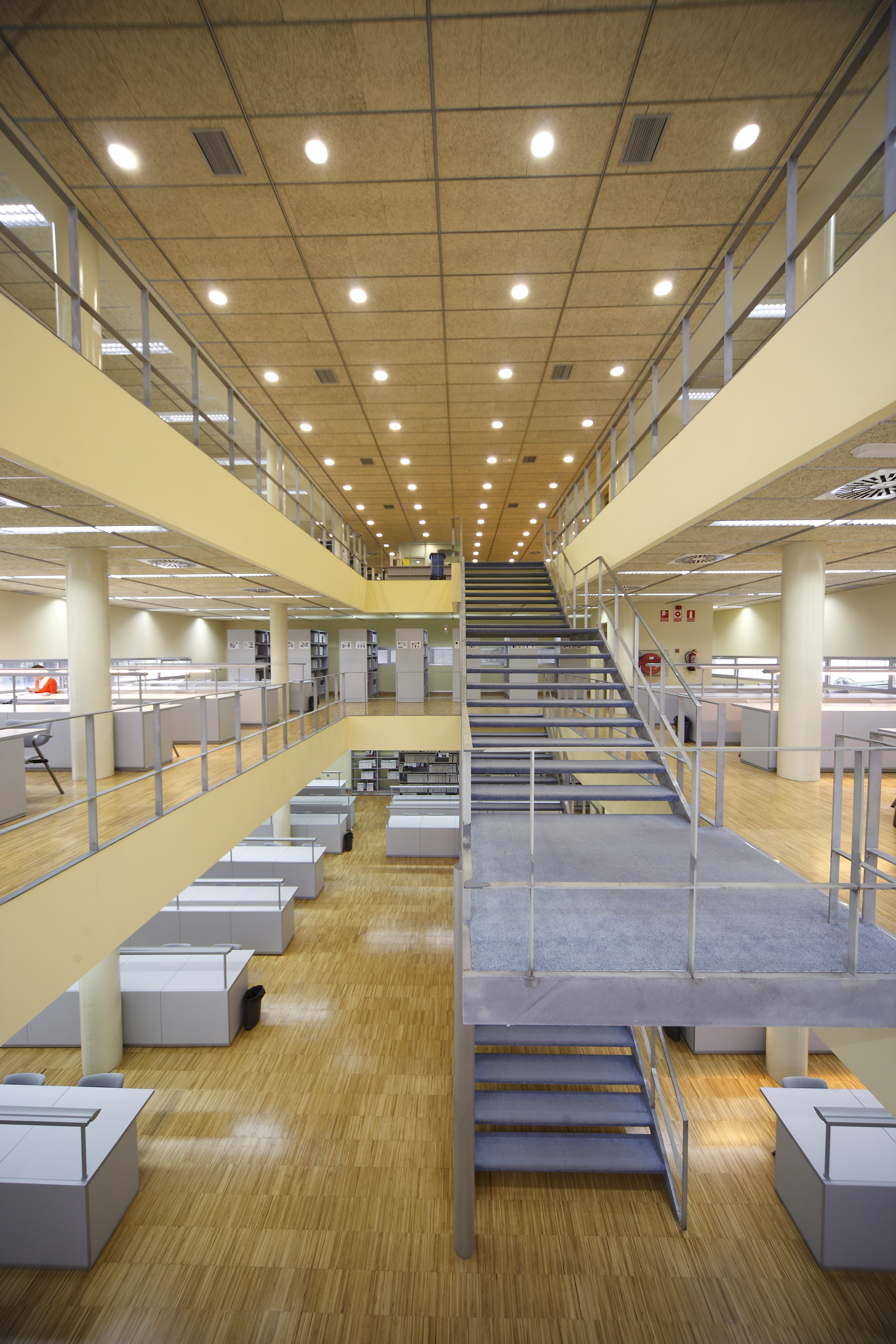
Biblioteca

== International ==
The school has several international agreements, especially through Europe's Erasmus Programme. It also holds bilateral agreements with a number of universities, primarily in South America:

- Flensburg University of Applied Sciences (Germany)
- École nationale supérieure des mines de Nancy (France)
- National Technical University of Athens (Greece)
- Polytechnic University of Milan (Italy)
- Norwegian University of Science and Technology (Norway)
- Technical University of Lisbon (Portugal)
- Silesian University of Technology (Poland)
- VSB – Technical University of Ostrava (Czech Republic)
- Dokuz Eylül University (Turkey)
- Federal University of Paraná (Brazil)
- Pontifical Catholic University of Peru (Peru)

== Science week exhibition ==
The school runs an annual science week for high school students, which provides an opportunity for younger students to observe the various scientific research activities of the school. This involves exposing them to fields such as energy, new materials, and environmental sciences. Student learning within the exhibition is divided into units, with a strong focus on interactive learning and hands-on activities. These methods are used to spark the interest of younger students, and encourage them to undertake scientific or technical education.
