= Xeito Fole =

Spanish transgender visual artist

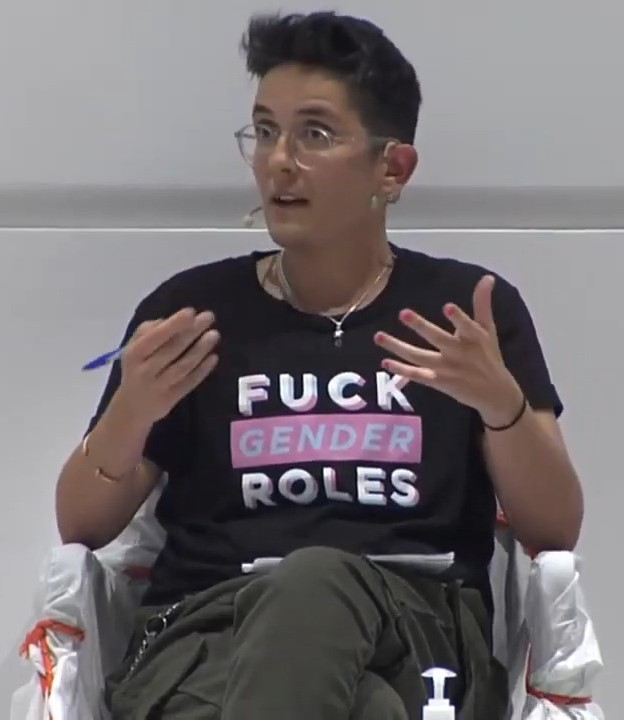
- Born: 1985 (age 40–41); Lugo, Spain
- Education: University of Vigo
- Occupation: Visual Artist
- Website: nontenxeito.net

Xeito Fole (born 1985) is a Galician transmedia artist, researcher, and cultural worker born in Lugo, Spain. Their multimedia practice investigates network culture, digital media, and their subsequent impact on online identity representation, specifically challenging hegemonic frameworks surrounding gender, sexuality, and species boundaries. Fole's projects frequently intersect contemporary art, political activism, and community education. They are a transgender, transfeminism, and anti-speciesism activist.

== Biography ==
=== Early life ===
They graduated in Fine Arts from the University of Vigo. They earned several scholarships that allowed them to study at the Pontifical Catholic University of Río de Janeiro, the École régionale des beaux-arts d'Angers and the University of Barcelona. It was in the latter that they completed their specialization in audiovisual studies. They later completed a master's degree in digital arts at Pompeu Fabra University.

=== Career ===
Their work is transversal and includes different disciplines, developing projects that relate art, politices, and education; during 2018, they carried out the project “Voces LGTBI+” (LGBTI+ Voices), together with iDensitat, presented at the Barcelona Museum of Contemporary Art (MACBA). In 2016 and 2017 they taught video and audiovisual language workshops aimed at collaborative works, like In Living Memory and A Travessia. They also coordinated artistic creation with training in sexual and gender diversity from a transversal perspective through creative methodologies.

Their work has been exposed in different exhibitions like:

- Diversidad, género y sexualidades (Porto, 2018)
- Muestra Marrana (Ecuador, 2016)
- El Venadito. Juntos contra el maltrato animal, Art Factory, Madrid (2016), CC Sagrada Familia, Barcelona (2016) Espai Antoni Miro Peris, Barcelona (2015)
- Habitat Creatiu, Can Felipa, Barcelona (2015)
- Artes Visuales, Creación Injuve. Tabacalera, Madrid (2012)
- Nits Digitals - Ciclo de artes electrónicas de Vic. ACVic (2012)
- Sense Titol '10, Facultad de Bellas Artes, Barcelona (2010)
- Nuevos Valores 2010. Pontevedra Museum

They have participated in artistic residencies in art centers like Hangar or AcVic.

== Recognition ==
- 10x10 Pública (2012)
- II Encontro Artistas Novos (2012)
- Novos Valores 2010
