= School of Industrial Engineering, University of Vigo =

School of Industrial Engineering
- Type: Public
- Established: 1901
- Parent institution: University of Vigo
- Director: Juan Enrique Pardo Froján
- Academic staff: 350 (2010–2011)
- Students: 4,443 (2010–2011)
- Location: Vigo, Spain; City: 42°13′38.2″N 8°44′4.9″W, Campus: 42°10′5.3″N 8°41′21.2″W
- Website: http://www.eei.uvigo.es

The School of Industrial Engineering is a center of the University of Vigo where industrial engineering studies are taught. It is established in two locations, one in the city center of Vigo, and another one on the campus of Vigo.

== History ==
The School of Industrial Engineering arises from the integration of the two facilities of the University of Vigo within the industrial engineering field: the School of Technical Industrial Engineering and Superior Technical School of Industrial Engineers.

The School of Industrial Engineering of Vigo was founded more than 110 years ago. Since its creation in 1901 several name and curriculum changes underwent: it was born with the Industry Collegename, later it was renamed to School of Industrial Experts with the degrees of industrial experts in mechanics, industrial chemistry and electricity. In 1971, it became the School of Industrial Engineering with the academic title of Industrial Engineering, with specialties in Mechanical, Electrical and Industrial Chemistry, and with a studies duration of three years. In 1988, the specialty of Industrial Electronics and Automation joined. In 2000, the Industrial Engineering specialty Electricity (two escalations) of specialty Industrial Mechanical Engineering (four majors) of Industrial Engineering Industrial Chemistry (two escalations) and Engineering Industrial Electronics Industrial technical specialty (two escalations) were implemented in the curricula.

The School of Industrial Engineering of Vigo was born in 1976 with the specialties of Electronics and Automatics, with a degree duration of six years. Subsequently, provision was expanded with the specialties of Industrial Organization, Electrical and Mechanical. During 2001 curriculum were modified and it was transformed to a five-year academic degree with majors of Mechanics, Construction and Facilities, Industrial Design & Manufacturing, Electricity and Automation and Electronics. In addition, the School implanted two second-cycle degrees: Industrial Engineering and Engineering in Automation and Industrial Electronics.

In October 2009, both schools began the process of convergence in a single center in order to improve and integrate the management and the degrees academic activities. In April 2010, the creation of the School of Industrial Engineering was approved by the Governing Council of the University of Vigo. Finally, in February 2011, removal of the old schools and the creation of the new school is published in the Diario Oficial de Galicia.

In 2010–2011 academic year the new curriculum adapted to the European Higher Education Area began teaching. With more than 4,400 students enrolled and 350 teachers it is one of biggest schools in the Galician university system.
