= University of Vigo =

Public university in Vigo, Pontevedra, Spain

- Universidade de Vigo
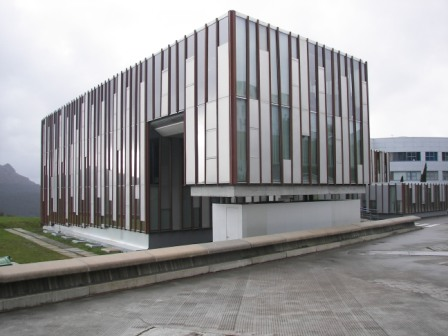
- Motto: Innovadora, pública, de calidade
- Type: Public university
- Established: 1990
- Academic affiliations: Compostela Group of Universities
- Rector: Manuel Reigosa Roger
- Faculty: 1400
- Administrative staff: 793
- Students: 18577
- Undergraduates: 15770
- Postgraduates: 1122
- Doctoral students: 665
- Location: Vigo, Province of Pontevedra, Galicia, Spain; 42.16976320°N 8.68457840°W
- Campus: Vigo, Pontevedra, Ourense
- Website: www.uvigo.gal/en

University rankings

Global – Overall
- ARWU World: 501–600 (2023)
- QS World: 851-900 (2026)
- THE World: 801–1000 (2024)
- USNWR Global: =866 (2023)

The University of Vigo (Galician: Universidade de Vigo) is a public university located in the city of Vigo in the Province of Pontevedra, Galicia, Spain. There are three campuses:

- Campus of Vigo in Lagoas-Marcosende, 15 kilometres away from the city centre. Also known as CUVI (Ciudad universitaria de Vigo, University city of Vigo);
- Campus of Pontevedra in A Xunqueira, Pontevedra, and in the city centre;
- Campus of Ourense in As Lagoas, Ourense.

Considered the most technical of the universities of Galicia, it offers engineering degrees in Aerospace Engineering, Mining, Telecommunications, Forestry Engineering, Computer Science and Industrial Engineering.

== History of the university in Galicia ==
=== Political background ===
Following the introduction of the new Spanish Constitution of 1978 and the arrival of democracy, the newly elected Prime Minister of Spain, Felipe Gonzalez Marquez, leader of the Spanish Socialist Workers' Party (PSOE), introduced legislation from Madrid to transform the hitherto centralized Spanish State into an amalgamation of autonomous regions with different degrees of self-administration.

The northwestern corner of the Iberian Peninsula was thus raised to the status of autonomous region, and the Spanish language had thereafter to co-exist with the new official language: Galician. A new parliament and a new government were created in Galicia for its people. And from the Galician capital, Santiago de Compostela, the newly created Galician Parliament would bring new legislation for the autonomous community. And it was in this set of circumstances that the university map in Galicia was transformed.

=== From one university to many ===
Galicia's first university, the University of Santiago de Compostela, was created in 1495. This was the only university in Galicia until the early 1980s, when two satellite campuses of the University of Santiago de Compostela were created in A Coruña and Vigo.

Before that, the only other institution in Galicia with the power to grant degrees was the School of Naval and Industrial Engineers of Ferrol, which was created by a ministerial order under the initiative of General Francisco Franco in the early 1960s. This school was directly dependent on the Ministry of Education in Madrid, although in 1992 it was amalgamated with the University of A Coruña.

In the late 1980s, the two university campuses of A Coruña and Vigo, which were created as dependent on the University of Santiago de Compostela, became fully independent universities, being able for the first time to issue their own official university degree titles.

=== From the 1990s to the present ===
As of the early 1990s, Galicia had three universities, each of them with its own satellite campuses. These were the University of Santiago de Compostela with two university campuses, one in Santiago de Compostela and the other in Lugo; the University of A Coruña with two university campuses, one in A Coruña and the other in Ferrol; and the University of Vigo with three university campuses, one in Pontevedra, one in Ourense, and one in Vigo.

== Campus of Vigo ==
Lagoas Marcosende - CUVI (15 kilometres away from Vigo downtown):

- School of Industrial Engineering
- School of Mining Engineering
- Faculty of Philology, Translation and Interpretation.
- Faculty of Juridic and Labour Sciences.
- Faculty of Economy, Business and Management Sciences.
- Superior Technical School of Telecommunication Engineering.
- Faculty of Biology.
- Faculty of Marine Science.
- Faculty of Chemistry.
- Center of Technological and Scientific Support for Investigation.

Downtown:

- School of Industrial Engineering
- School of Nursing (at Hospital of Meixoeiro or at Povisa Policlinic Center).
- School of Business Studies.
- School of Teaching for Primary Education.

== Campus of Pontevedra ==
A Xunqueira:

- Faculty of Communication of Pontevedra
- Faculty of Education and Sport of Pontevedra
- Faculty of Management and Public Administration of Pontevedra
- Faculty of Physiotherapy of Pontevedra
- School of Forest Engineering of Pontevedra

Downtown:

- Faculty of Fine Arts of Pontevedra
- Faculty of Design of Pontevedra
- School of Nursing of Pontevedra

Marín:

- Defence University Centre at the Spanish Naval Military Academy.

== Campus of Ourense ==
- School of Aeronautical and Space Engineering
- School of Computer Engineering.
- School of Nursing.
- Faculty of Sciences.
- Faculty of Education Sciences.
- Faculty of Business and Tourism Studies.
- Faculty of History.
- Faculty of Law.

== Publications ==
The University publishes the interdisciplinary journal of marine sciences Thalassas.

== Notable alumni ==
Notable alumni include:

- Xeito Fole

== See also ==
- Higher School of Mining Engineering
- Xosé Luís Méndez Ferrín
- University of Santiago de Compostela
- University of A Coruña
