= School of Forest Engineering of Pontevedra =

School in Pontevedra, Spain

- Escuela de Ingeniería Forestal de Pontevedra
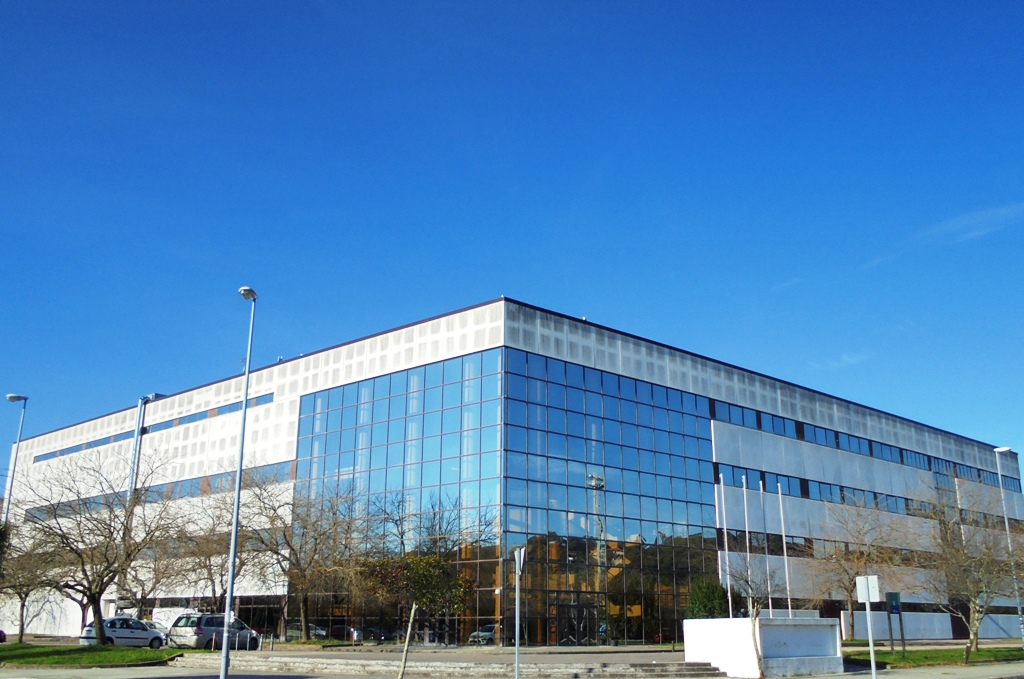
- School façade
- Type: Public School
- Established: 1990
- Parent institution: University of Vigo
- Affiliations: Pontevedra Campus
- Students: 137
- Location: Pontevedra, Spain; 42°26′23.6″N 8°38′12.0″W
- Campus: A Xunqueira campus

The Forest Engineering School of Pontevedra is a university school founded in 1990 in the Spanish city of Pontevedra, based on the campus of A Xunqueira, in the north of the city.

The faculty belongs to the Pontevedra Campus, integrated in the Galician University System and dependent on the University of Vigo. It offers undergraduate studies in Forestry Engineering.

== History ==
The Forest Engineering School of Pontevedra was created in 1990 by Decree 416/1990 of 31 July of the Regional Ministry of Education, in its article 15, under the name of University School of Technical Engineers of Forest Industries. The same decree authorised the awarding of the degree of technical engineer of forestry industries to the school.

The creation of the Forest Engineering School in the city is closely linked to the forestry tradition of Pontevedra. The city and the region of Pontevedra have been linked to the forestry sector since the first decades of the 20th century. The Biological Mission of Galicia was established in Pontevedra in 1928 and the Lourizán Forestry Centre had been located in Lourizán since 1943, when the Provincial Council of Pontevedra handed over the Lourizán Palace to the Ministry of Education to be used as a regional centre for teaching, research and forestry experiments, which became the Higher Technical School of Forestry in 1946.

The first programme of the School of Forest Engineering at the University Campus of Pontevedra was adopted on 16 July 1991 and the school started to operate in the 1991–1992 academic year.

Initially, the school was temporarily housed in premises donated by the E.G.B.'s teacher training school (the former teacher training college near the Lérez River on Buenos Aires Avenue) and only moved to its definitive headquarters, a building of its own on the A Xunqueira campus, in 1996. On 14 October 1995, the building, designed by the architect José Ramón Rúa Rodríguez, was almost finished and was the first building constructed on the A Xunqueira campus.

In 1999, by Decree 216/1999, of 15 July, in its article 3, the school became the University School of Technical Forestry Engineering. In 2011, by Decree 14/2011 of 3 February, the school was renamed School of Forest Engineering, a name it retains today.

In 2019, the school's forest engineering degree became the fourth Galician university degree to obtain the international EUR-ACE quality label in engineering.

== Programmes ==
The school offers a Bachelor's degree in forest engineering. The specialisations offered are forest industries and logging.

== Facilities ==
The administrative services of the Pontevedra university campus and the documentation delivery and collection point (LERD) of the Galician university system are located in the School of Forest Engineering. The Erasmus Students Network organisation for Erasmus students also has a branch in Pontevedra located in the school.

== Direction team ==
The director of the School of Forest Engineering is Juan Picos Martín and the assistant director is Mª Ángeles Cancela Carral. The secretary is José Manuel Casas Mirás.

== Activities ==
The school organises and hosts various activities such as the Galician Days of Natural Heritage and Biodiversity. In November 2019, the III Galician Days of Natural Heritage and Biodiversity took place at the school with different conferences on topics such as red tides, light pollution, conservation of species such as salamanders or bears, or forest and landscape management.

== Culture ==
The patron saint of the faculty is Saint Leander and the faculty celebrates his feast day in April.

== Gallery ==
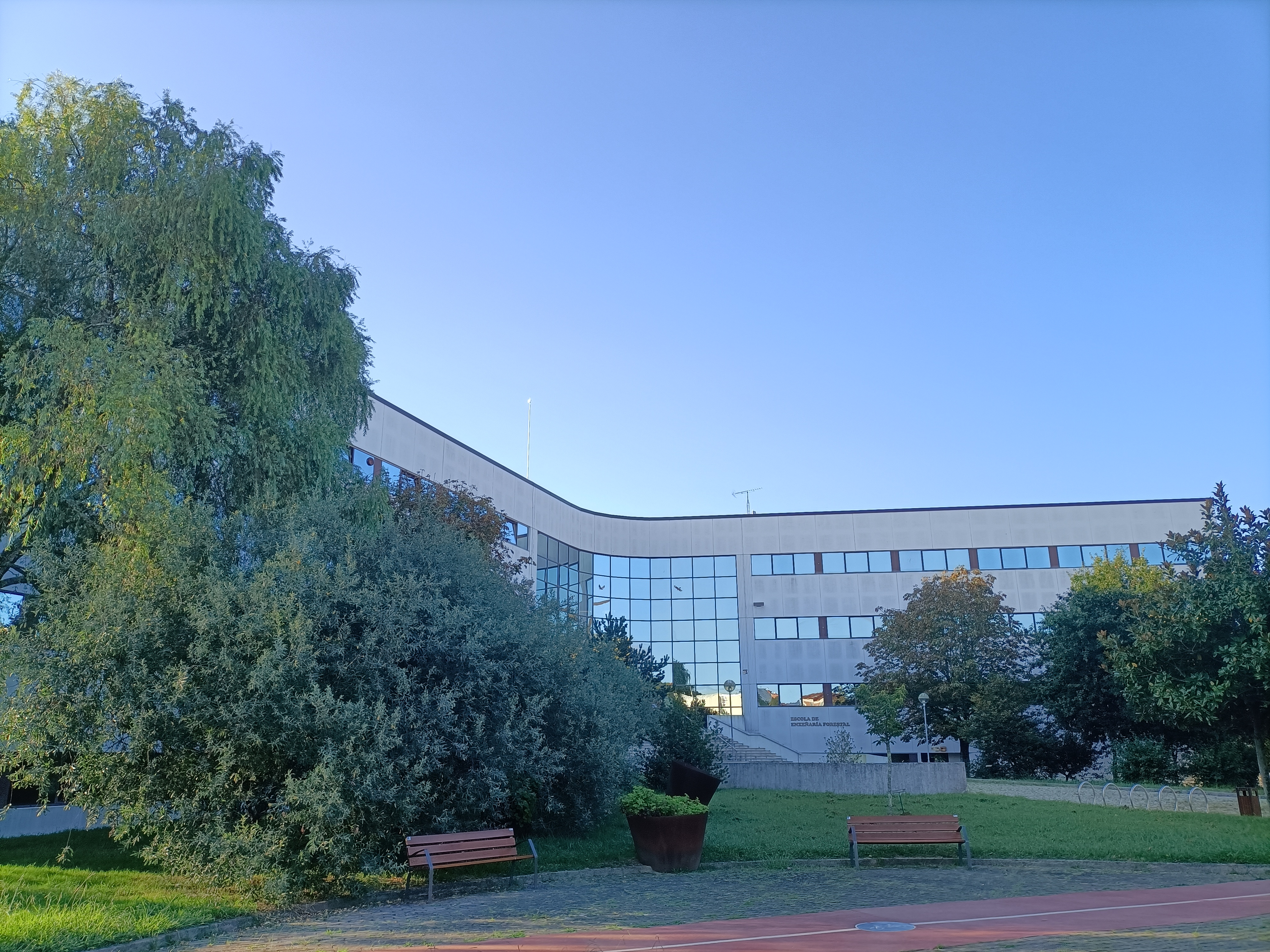
Main façade (west)

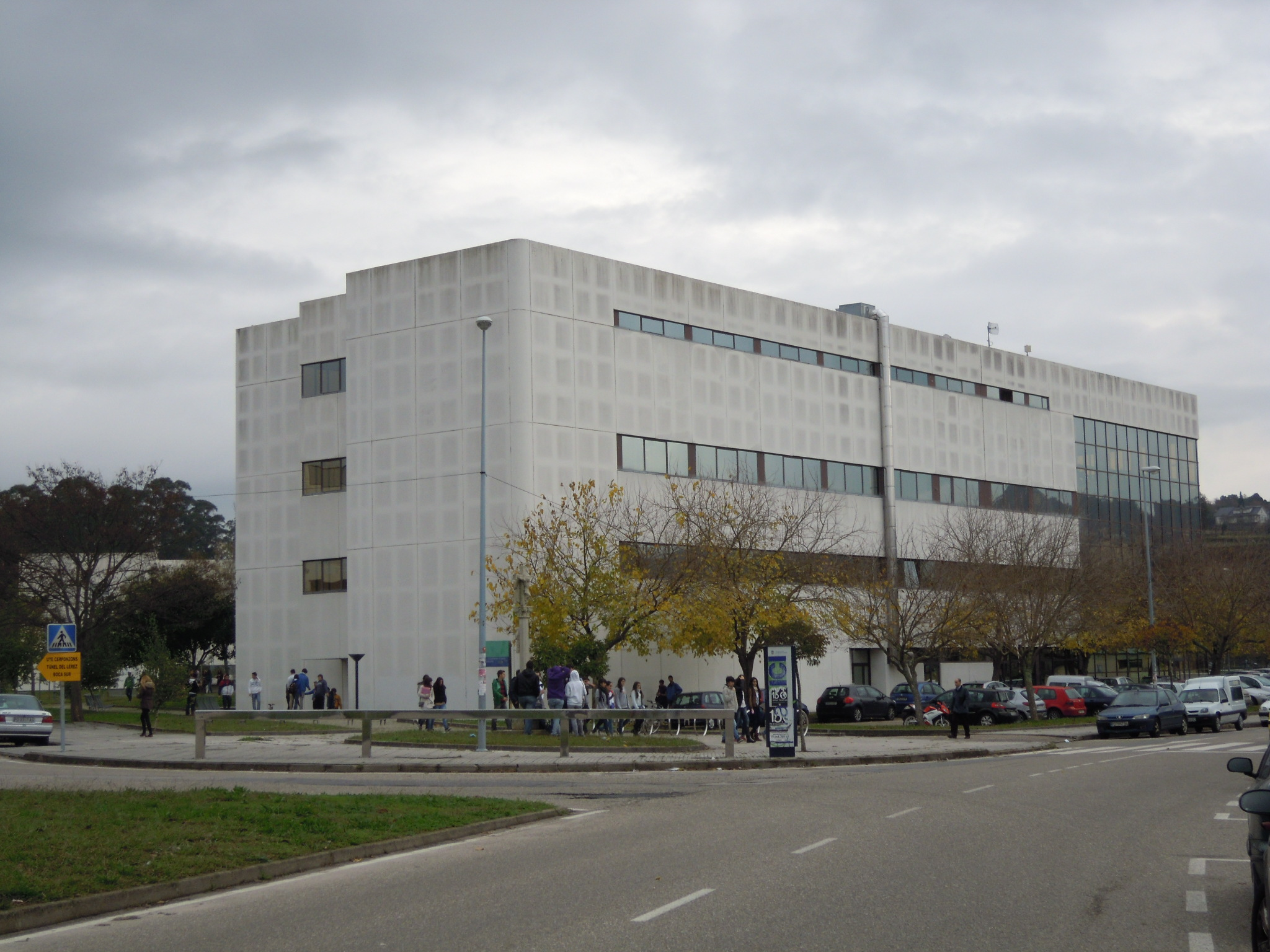
Southeast façade

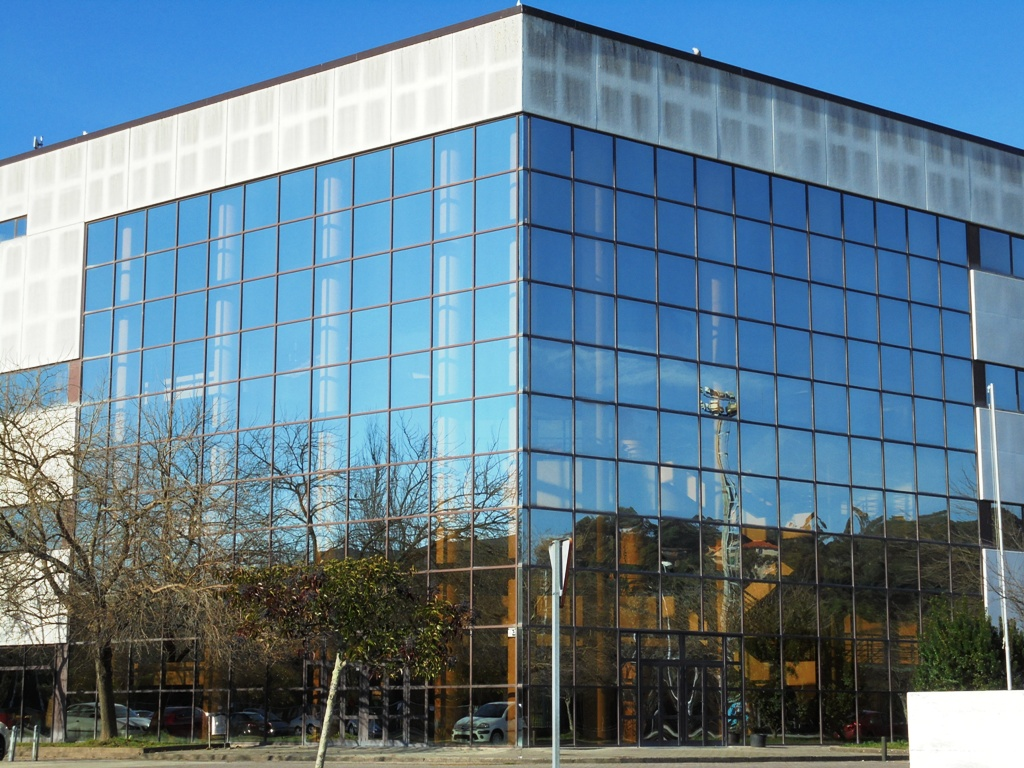
Detail of the south façade

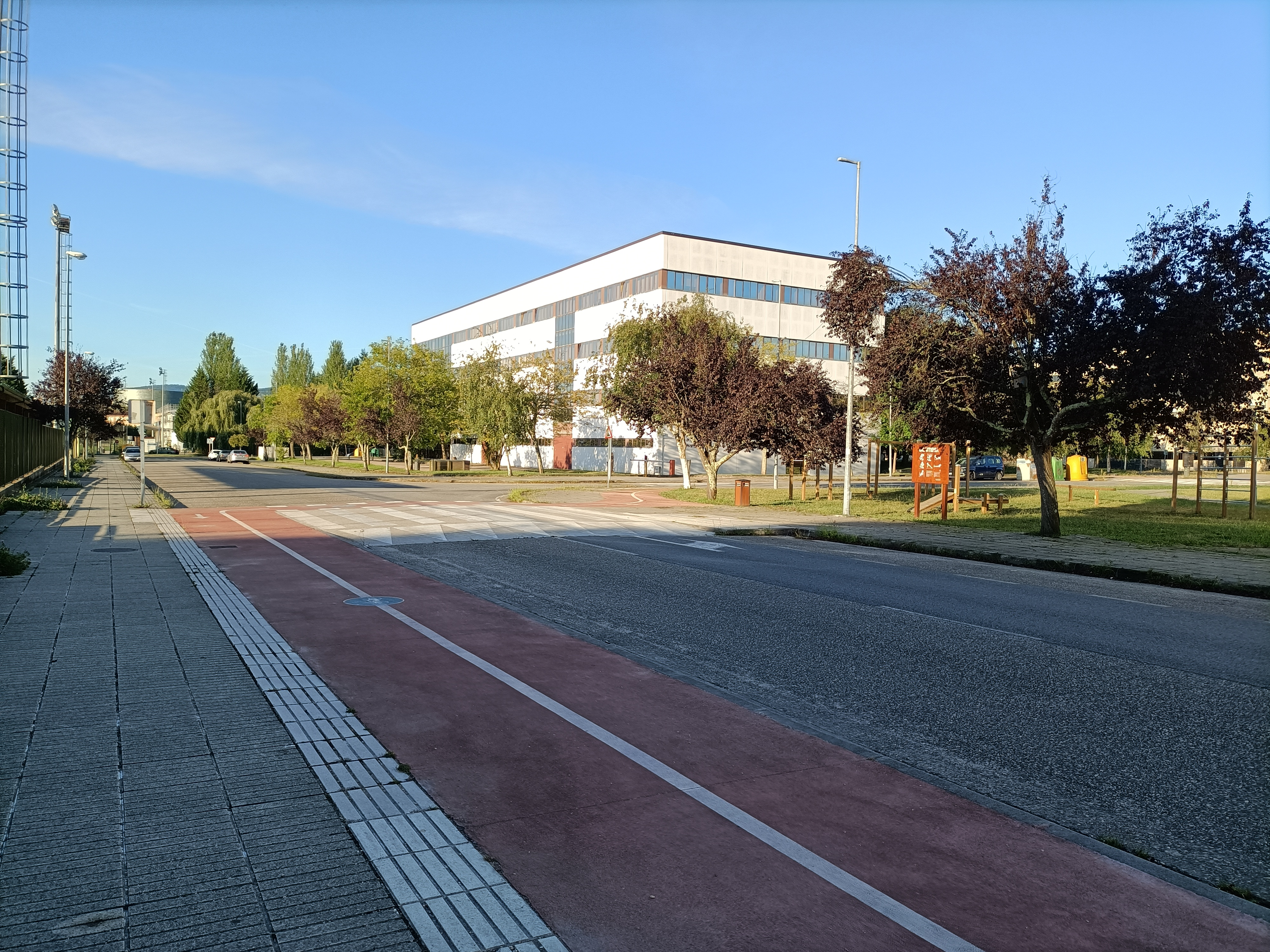
East and north façades and cycle lane

== See also ==
=== Related articles ===
- Faculty of Education and Sport of Pontevedra
- Faculty of Communication of Pontevedra
- Faculty of Fine Arts of Pontevedra

=== External links ===
- School of Forest Engineering website
