= Faculty of Education and Sport of Pontevedra =

Faculty in Pontevedra, Spain

- Facultad de Ciencias de la Educación y del Deporte de Pontevedra
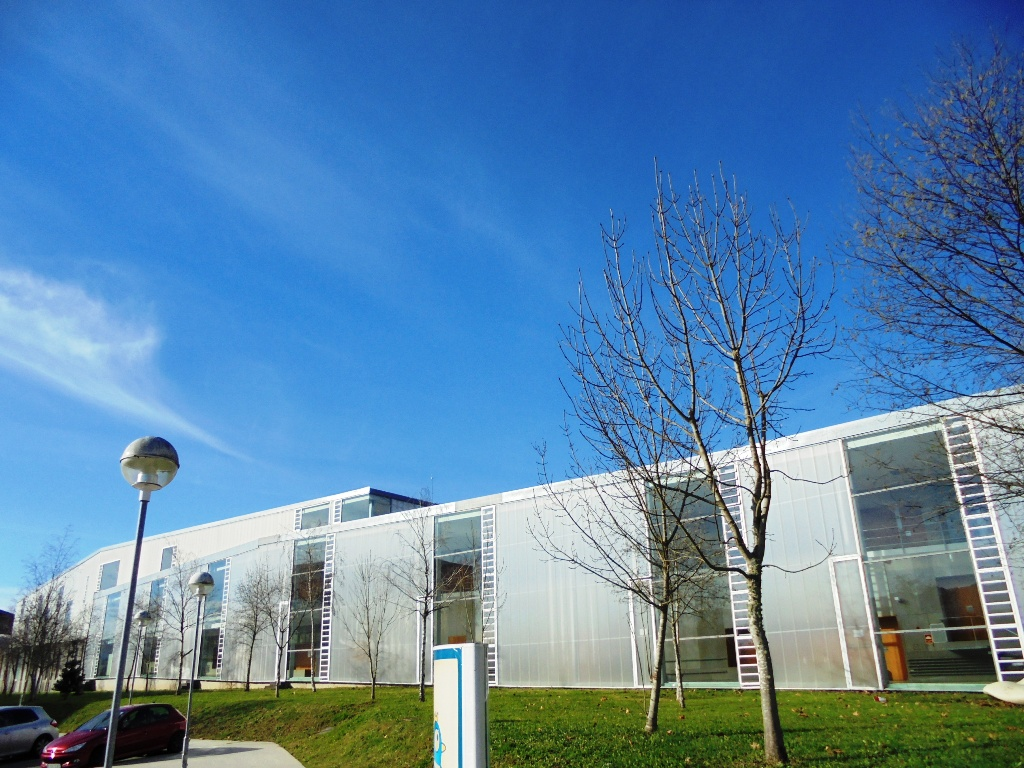
- Faculty façade
- Type: Public Faculty
- Established: 1999
- Parent institution: University of Vigo
- Affiliations: Pontevedra Campus
- Students: 1600
- Location: Pontevedra, Spain; 42°26′29.4″N 8°38′13.7″W
- Campus: A Xunqueira campus

The Faculty of Education and Sport of Pontevedra is a university faculty founded in 1999 in the Spanish city of Pontevedra, based on the A Xunqueira campus in the north of the city.

The faculty belongs to the Pontevedra Campus, integrated in the Galician University System and dependent on the University of Vigo. It offers undergraduate, graduate and doctoral studies in Sport and Education.

== History ==
The current Faculty of Education was born out of the Pontevedra Teacher Training College (for men), which was created in 1845. Its first location was the former College of the Society of Jesus. In 1860, the Pontevedra Female Teacher Training College was created. It was the first school for female teachers in Galicia and was also located in the former Jesuit College. Later, from 1881 to 1930, it was located in the pazo García Flórez. The men's school then moved to the pazo de Mugartegui. In 1896, on the Gran Vía de Montero Ríos, construction began on the large eclectic building designed by the architect Arturo Calvo Tomelén for the School of Arts and Crafts, which was inaugurated in 1901 and later housed the Mixed Teacher Training School of Pontevedra.

The school was located in the Gran Vía de Montero Ríos building and remained a normal school until the Spanish General Education Act of 1970 stipulated that normal schools would be integrated into universities as university normal schools for basic general education (EGB). In 1972, the Normal School of Pontevedra was integrated into the University of Santiago de Compostela by Decree 1381/1972, of 25 May, in its article 2, and took the name of University Normal School of Basic General Education of Pontevedra. Thus, the modern educational establishment has its origin in the University School of Basic General Education of Pontevedra, which was integrated into the University of Santiago de Compostela and was located on the south bank of the Lérez River, in Buenos Aires Avenue.

During the 1993–1994 school year, the specialities of physical education, musical education, primary education and pre-school education began to be taught at the Pontevedra school, authorised by Decree 26/1993, of 11 February, of the Regional Ministry of Education, in its article 2, in accordance with Royal Decree 1440/1991, of 30 August, which established the official university diploma of school teacher, in its different specialities.

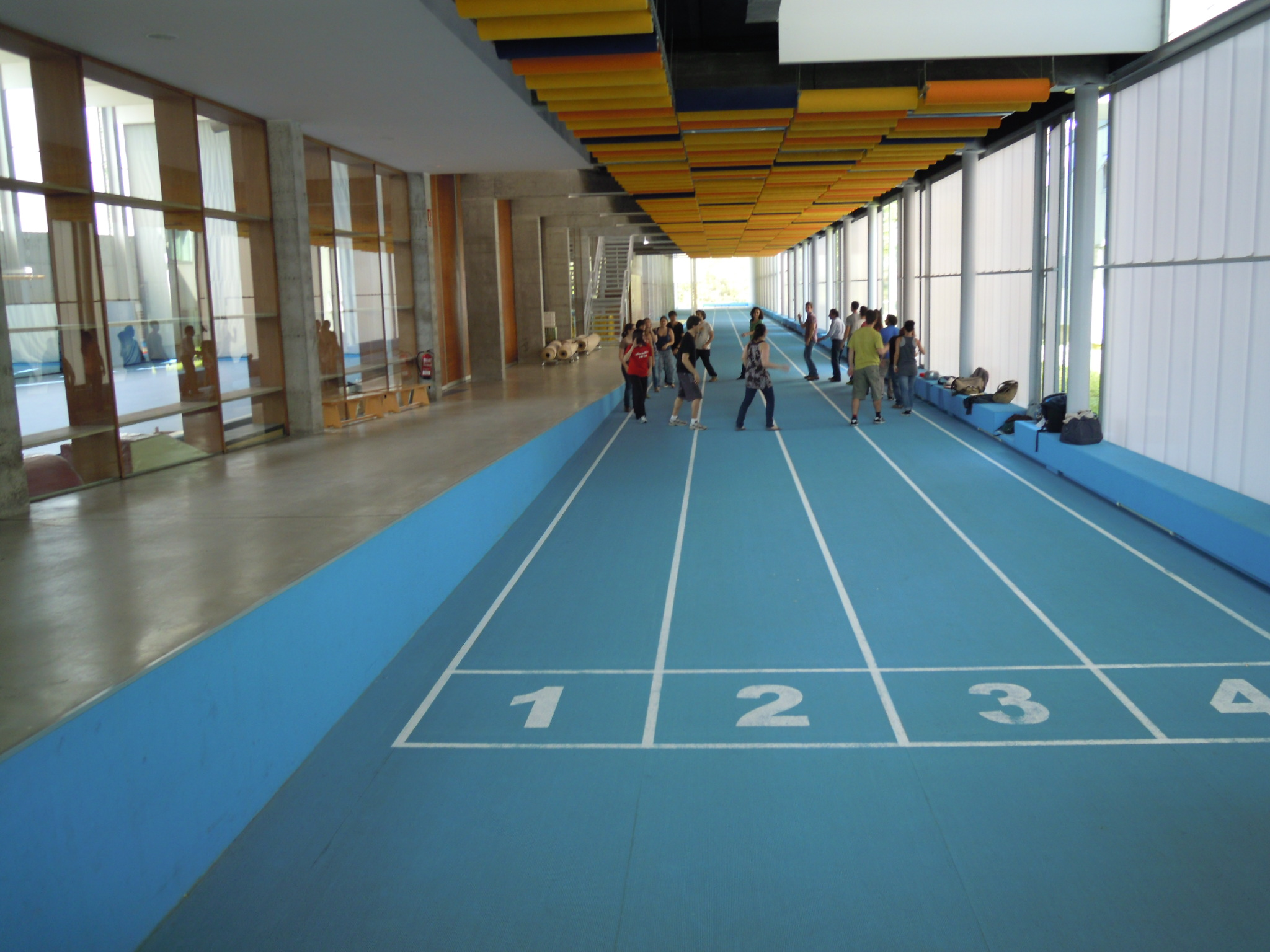
Running track.

In 1998, the transformation process of the school into a faculty began. At that time, 1,400 people were enrolled as students and the teaching staff consisted of 90 people. In 1999, by Decree 250/1999 of 9 September, Article 3, the Faculty of Educational Sciences was established by transformation of the University School of Teacher Education of the EGB and authorisation was granted for the implementation in the Faculty of studies leading to the degree of Bachelor of Science in Physical Activity and Sport and it was also authorised to house studies leading to teacher's degrees in the specialities of pre-school education, primary education, musical education and physical education.

In 2006, by Decree 28/2006 of 9 February, the faculty was renamed Faculty of Education and Sport.

The design of the current Faculty building, which opened on the A Xunqueira campus in October 2006, designed by the architects Jesús Irisarri Castro and Guadalupe Piñera, won the SICE prize in 2008, awarded by the Spanish High Council of Architects' Associations.

== Programmes ==
Undergraduate:

- Bachelor's degree in Science in Physical Activity and Sport,
- Bachelor's degree in primary education,
- Bachelor's degree in pre-school education

Postgraduate:

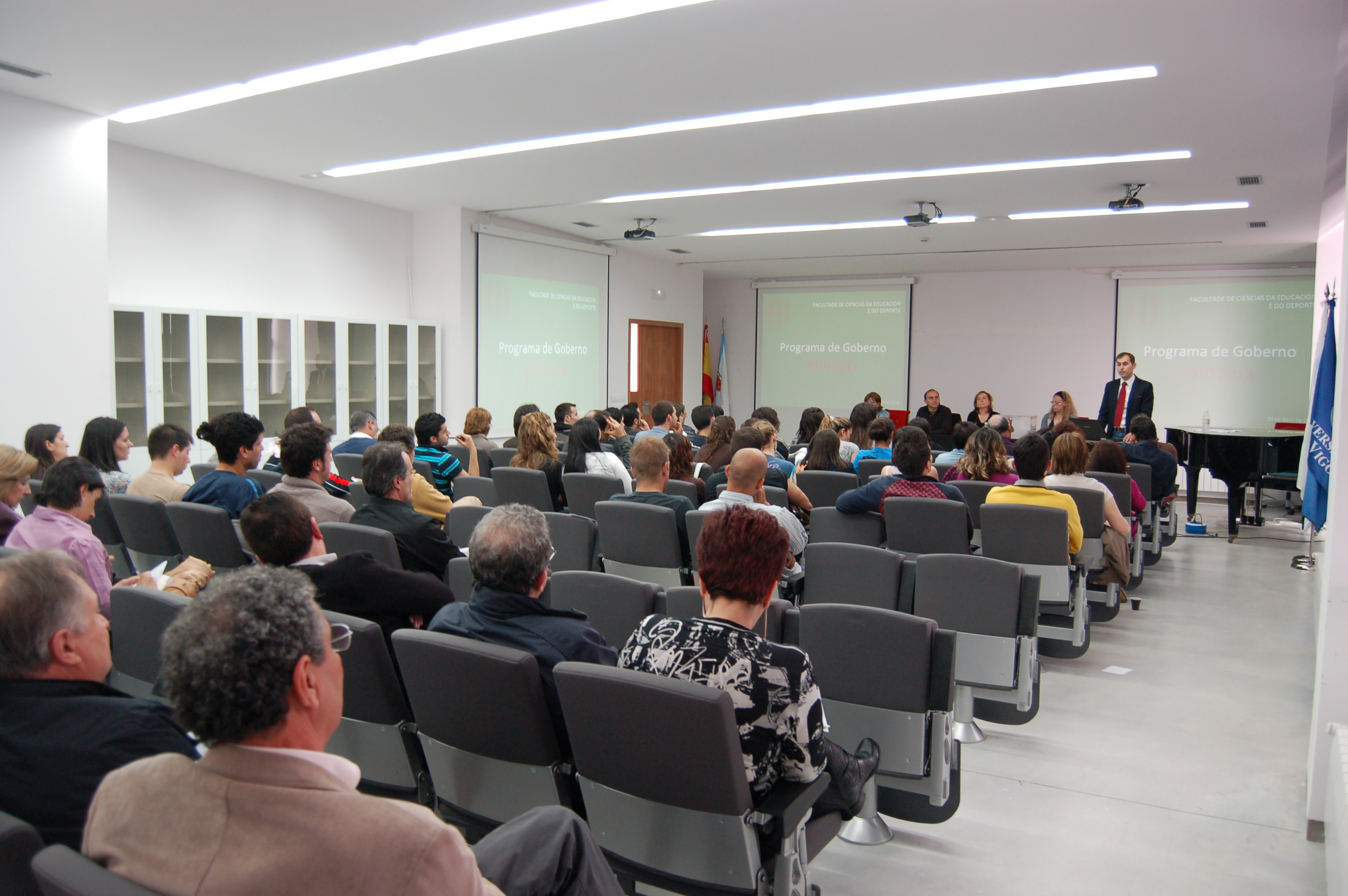
Conference room.

- Inter-university master's degree in Research on Physical Activity, Sport and Health, in collaboration with the University of A Coruña.
- Inter-University Master in Integrated Project Management (DIP).
- Master in Special Educational Needs (MUNAE).
- Master in Compulsory Secondary Education, Bachillerato, Professional Training and Language Teaching. Specialities: Experimental Sciences. Physical Education.
- Master's degree in research and innovation in specific didactics of pre-school and primary education.

The faculty also offers three PhDs:

- PhD in education, Sport and Health,
- PhD in Sport Science, Physical Education and Healthy Physical Activity,
- PhD in Equity and Innovation in Education.

== Culture ==
In April, the Faculty celebrates the feast of Saint Isidore of Seville, the patron saint of the Faculty. The Faculty publishes the Journal of Educational Research (Revista de Investigación en Educación).

== Gallery ==
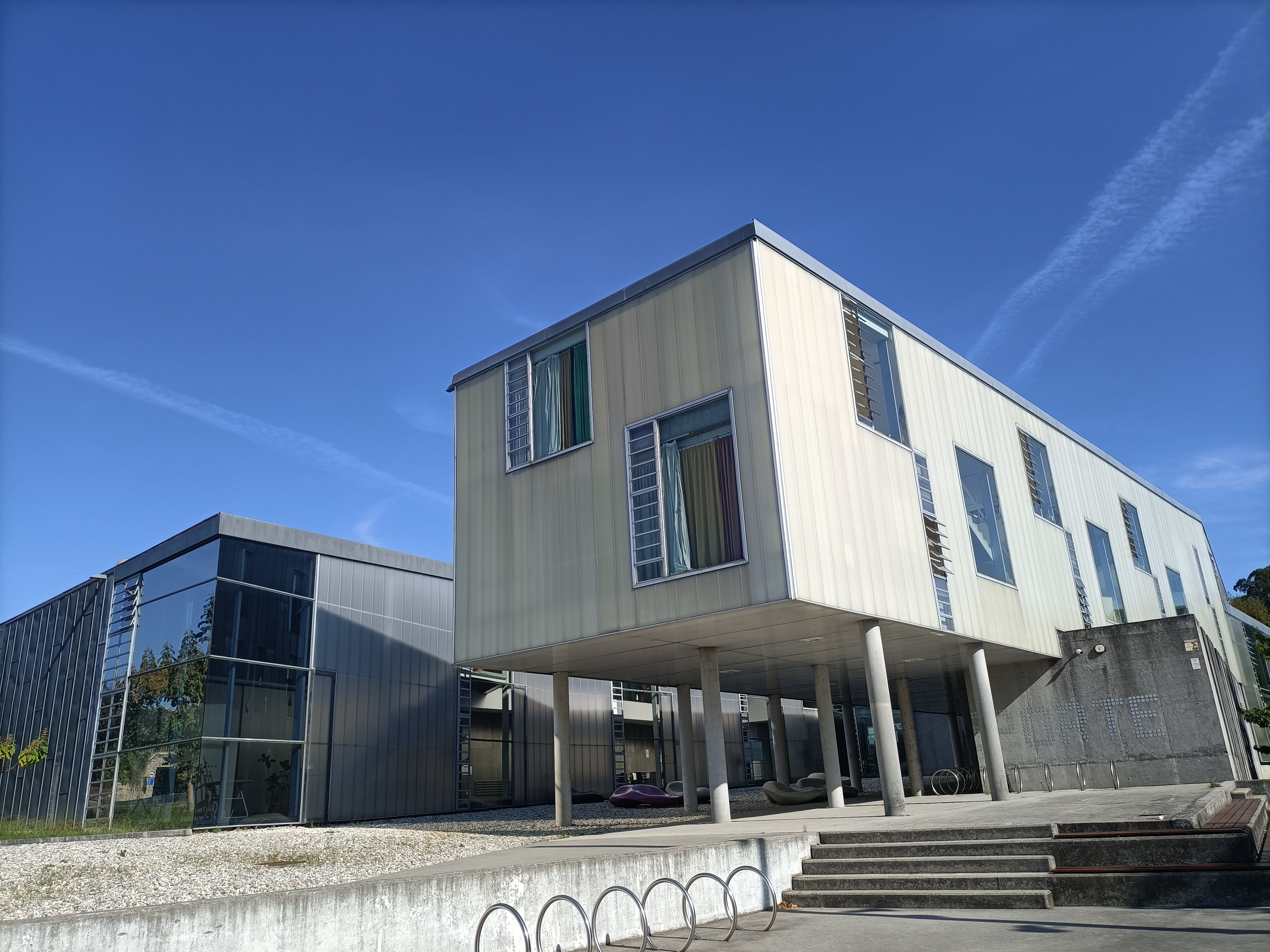

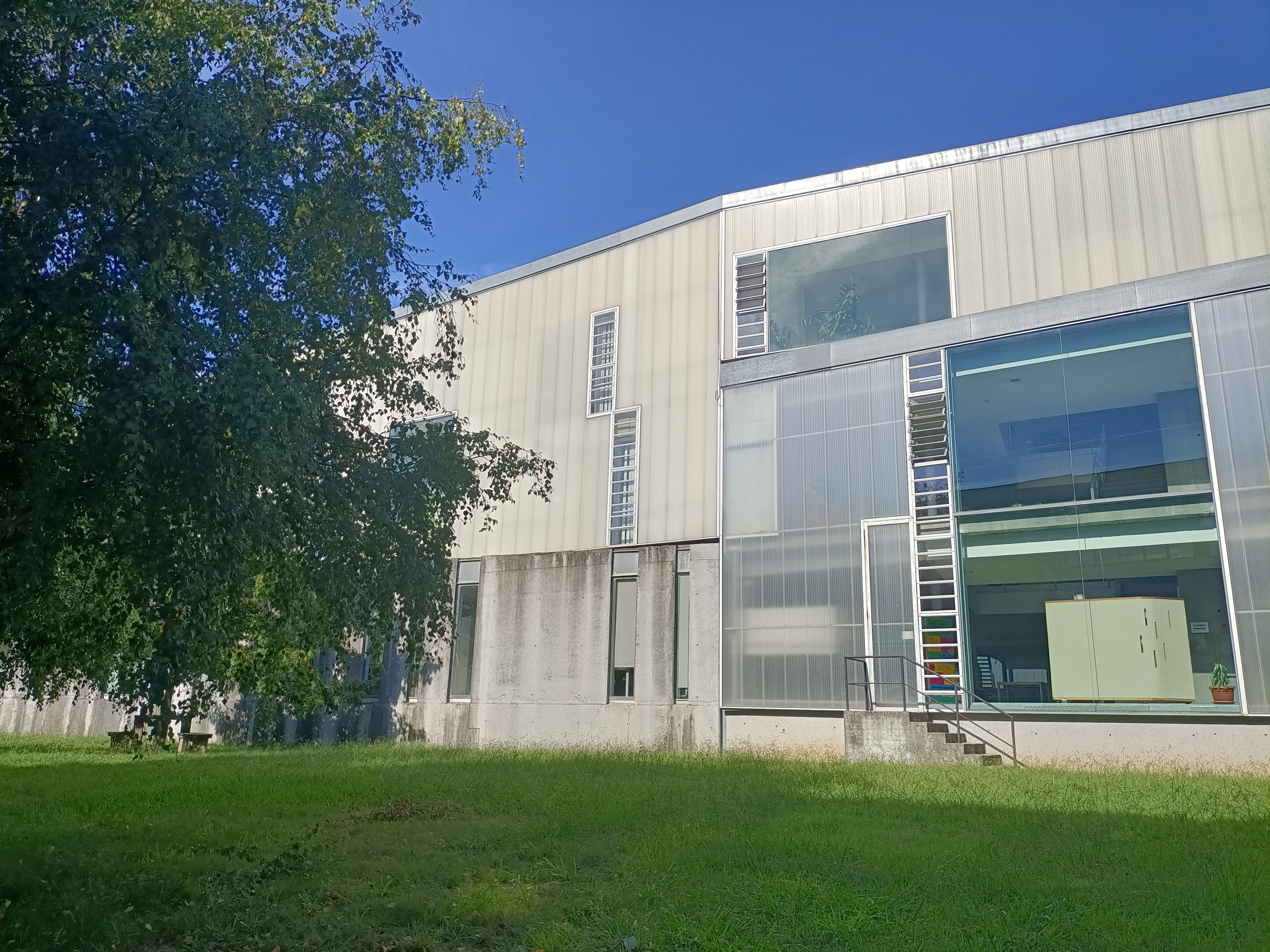

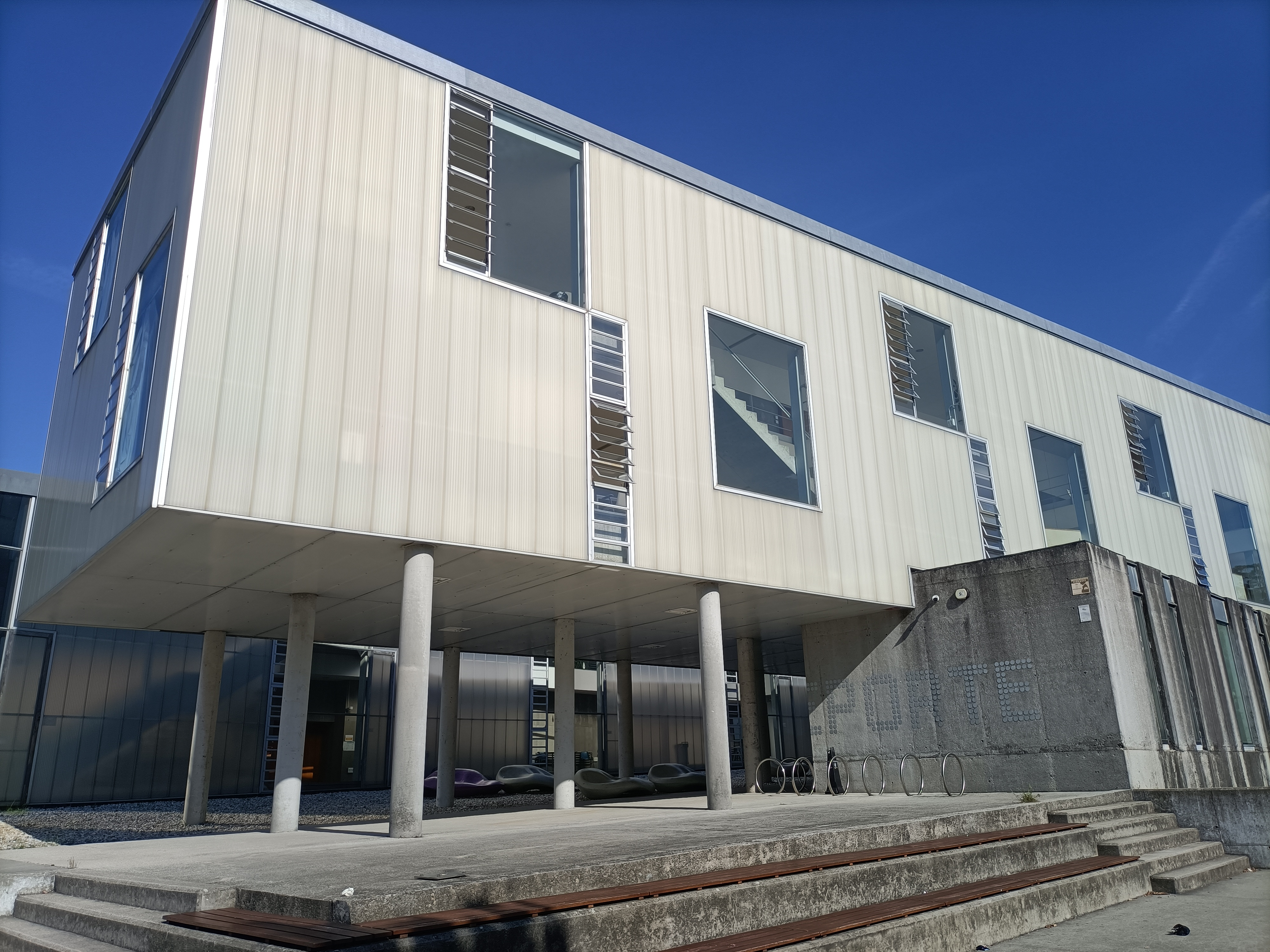

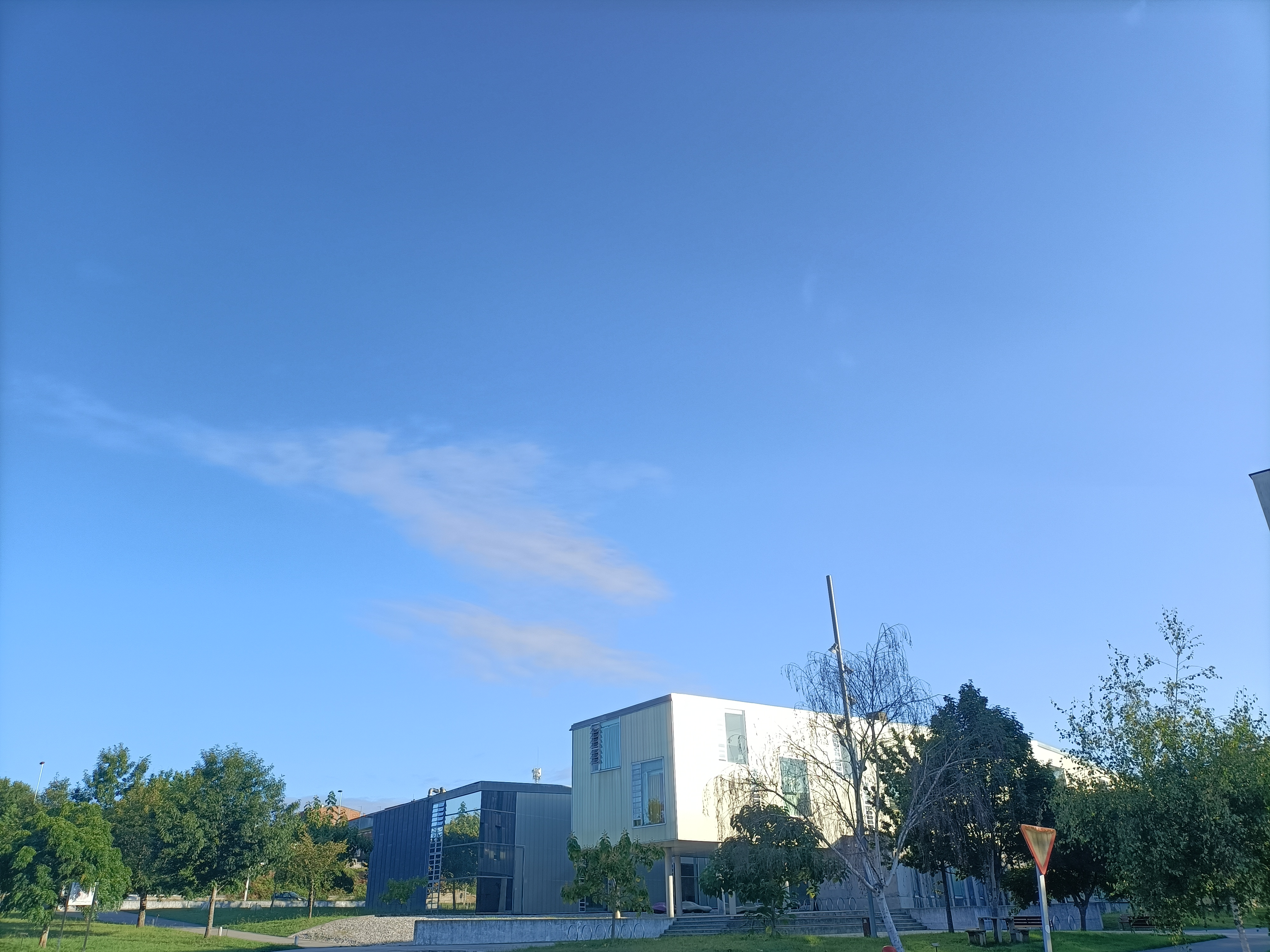

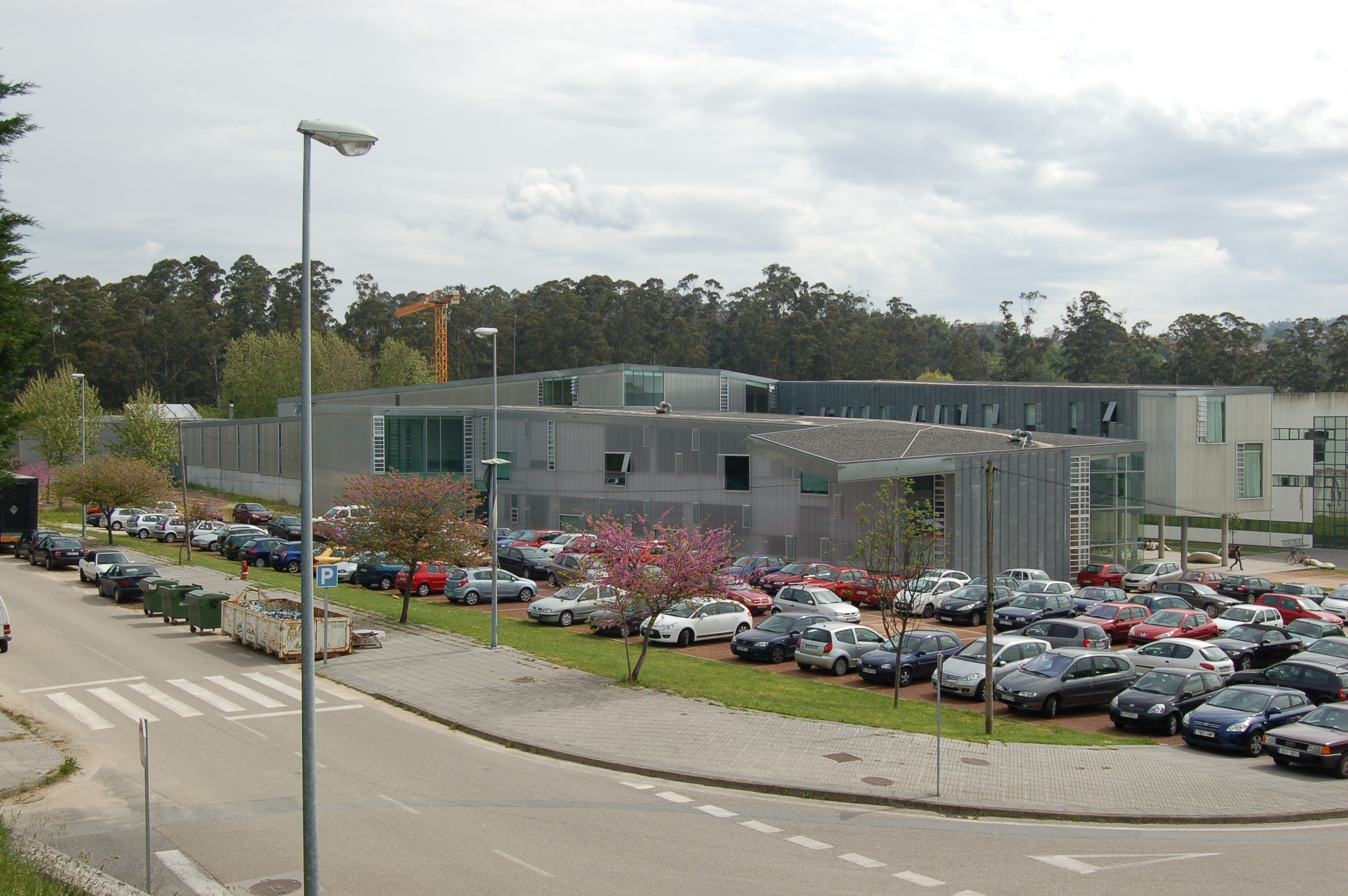

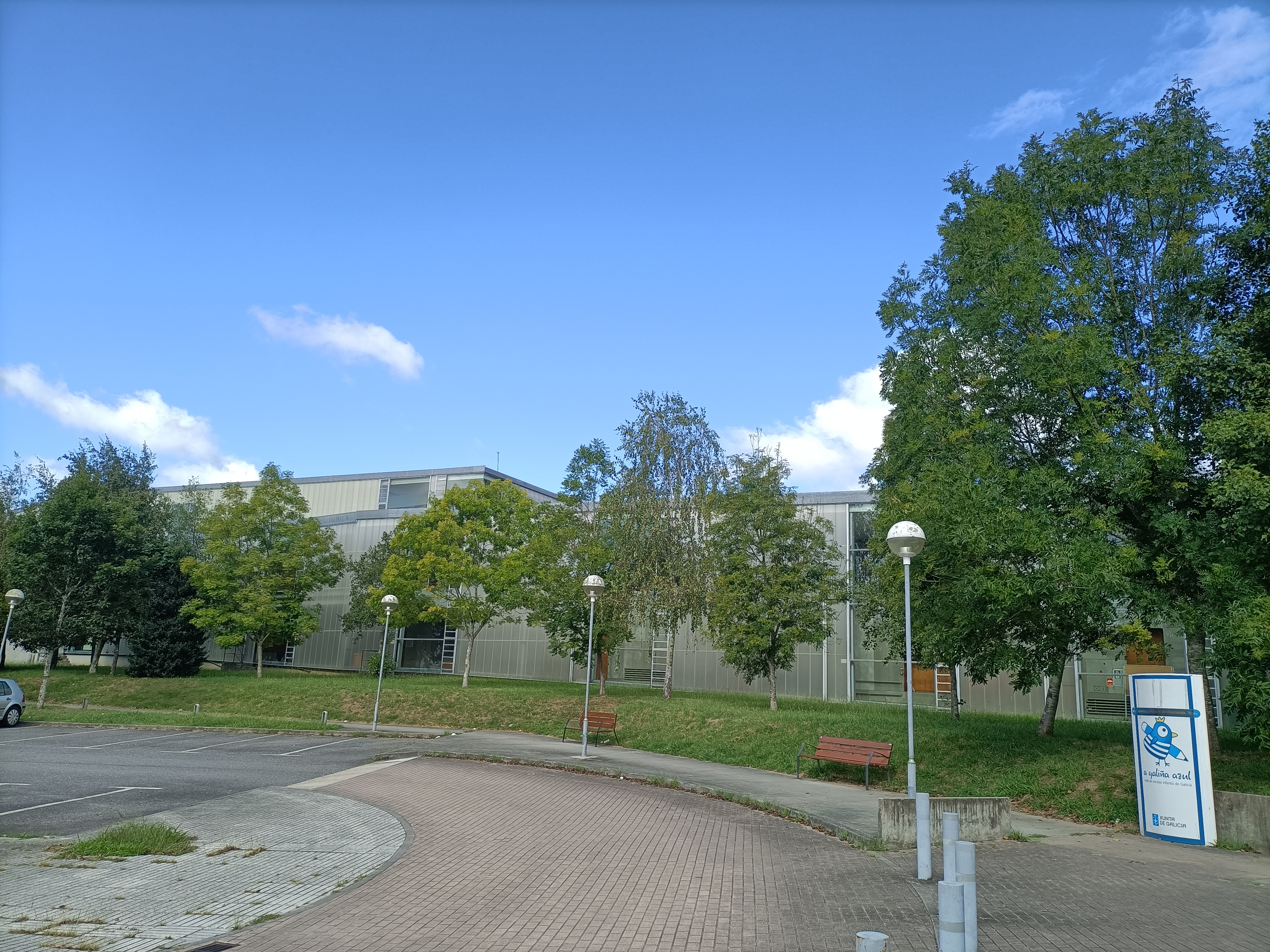

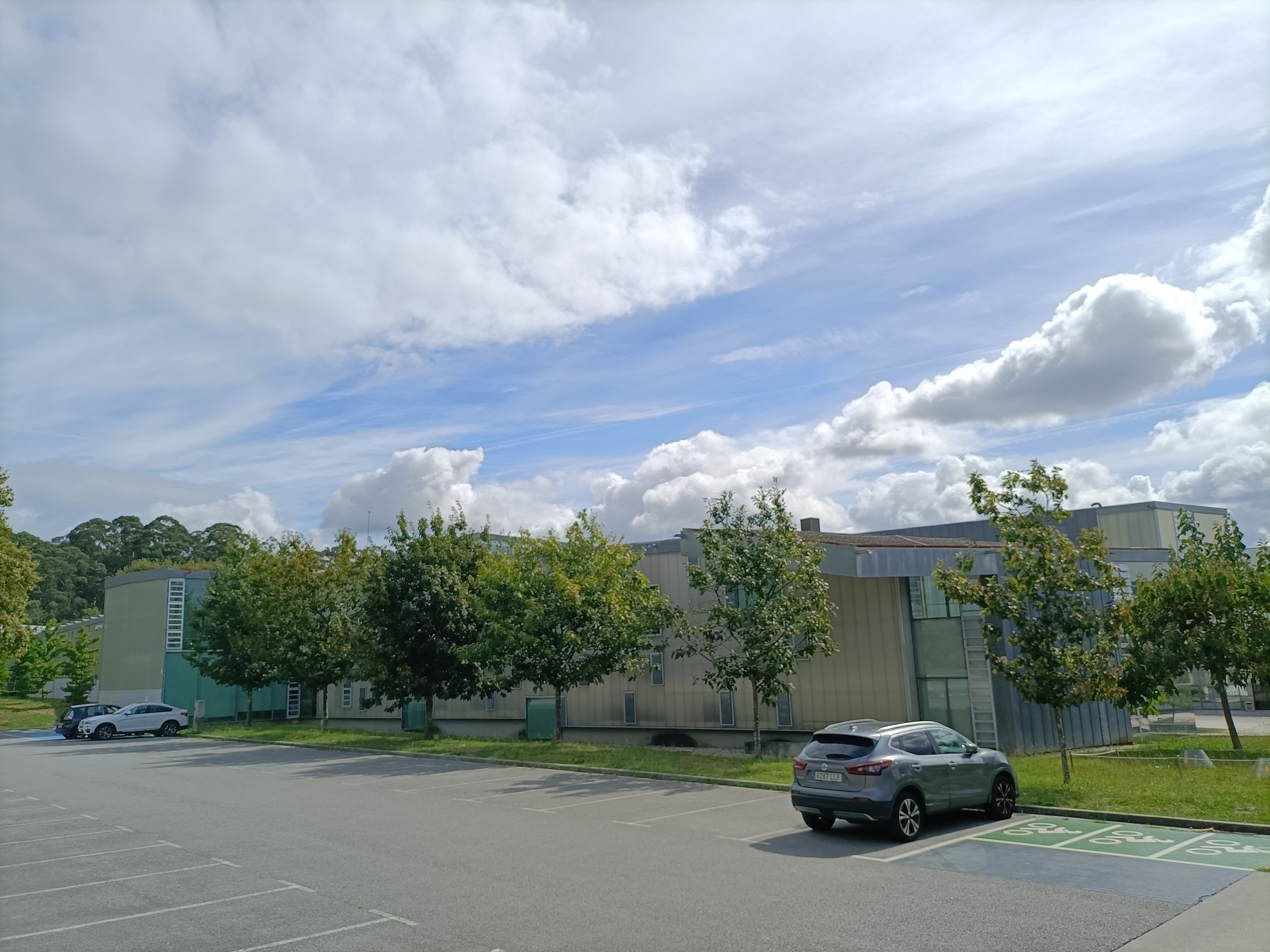

== See also ==
=== Bibliography ===
- Ángel Serafín Porto Ucha (2002). "Instituciones para la formación de la mujer. La Escuela Normal Superior de Maestras de Pontevedra: Nacimiento y evolución (1860-1901)". Innovación Educativa (in Spanish). 12: 17–46. ISSN 1130-8656.

=== Related articles ===
- Faculty of Communication of Pontevedra
- Faculty of Fine Arts of Pontevedra
- School of Forest Engineering of Pontevedra

=== External links ===
- Website of the Faculty
- Campus of the Pontevedra University - Faculty of Education Building
