= Villapadierna =

Villapadierna is a surname. Notable people with the surname include:

- Ramiro Villapadierna (born 1964), Spanish journalist
- José de Villapadierna (1909–1978), Spanish racing driver and equestrian
