= National University of Distance Education =

Spanish distance learning and research university

- Universidad Nacional de Educación a Distancia
- Other name: UNED
- Motto: Omnibus mobilibus mobilior sapientia
- Motto in English: Wisdom moves more than all things that move
- Type: Public research university
- Established: August 18, 1972; 54 years ago
- Budget: €240 million (2023)
- Rector: Ricardo Mairal Uson
- Academic staff: 1.303 (2019)
- Administrative staff: 1.132 (2019)
- Students: 194.733 (2021)
- Undergraduates: 158.963 (2021)
- Postgraduates: 10.266 (2021)
- Doctoral students: 2.053 (2021)
- Location: Bravo Murillo, 38, 28015, Madrid, Community of Madrid, Spain; 40.41889°N 3.69194°W
- Campus: Urban, Ciudad Universitaria de Madrid and Campus de Senda del Rey
- Language: Spanish
- Colors: Green
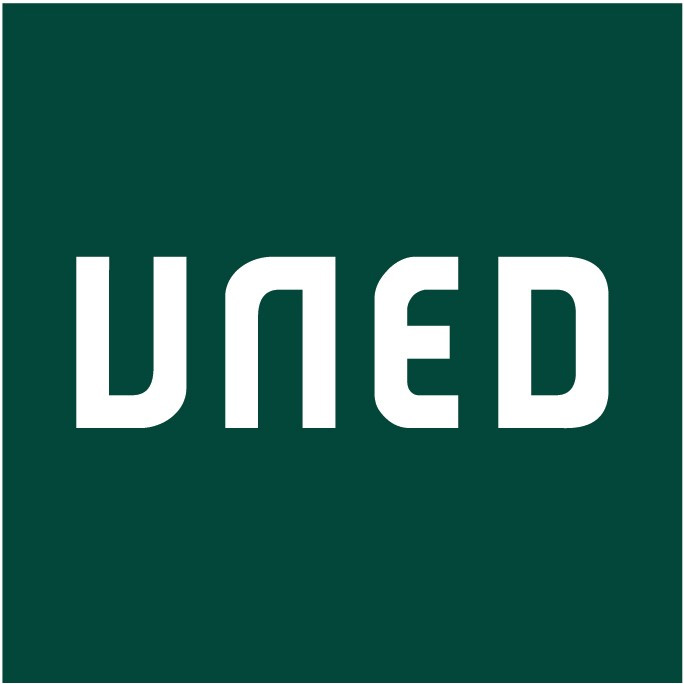
- ^{a} Consortium. Note: Associations and entities. Fulbright Program; FECYT; Fundación Sandra Ibarra; Fundación Barrié de la Maza; Fundación Alvargonzález; Instituto de Estudios Ceutíes; Fundación La Caixa; Instituto Misgav Yerushalayim; CIOFF-Inaem; Fundación Von Humboldt; Fundación Uceif; Fundación Mapfre; Fundación Lázaro Galdiano; Instituto Danone; Fundación Caja Madrid; Fundación Alfonso Martín Escudero; Fundación Española de la Nutrición; Centro de información Cerveza y Salud

The National University of Distance Education (Spanish: Universidad Nacional de Educación a Distancia, UNED) is a distance learning and research university founded in 1972 and is the only university run by the government of Spain. The headquarters is located in Madrid, with campuses in all Spanish autonomous communities. There are 14 study centers and 3 exam points in 13 countries in Europe, the Americas and Africa. The University awards undergraduate and postgraduate degrees, as well as non-degree qualifications such as diplomas and certificates, or continuing education units.

UNED is focused on distance learning combined with traditional classroom instruction (called hybrid or blended) and supports over 150,000 students.

== Origins and methodology ==
Founded in 1972 with the stated purpose of providing education opportunities via a distance education system - in which students are taught while not being physically present - UNED awards the same qualifications as other Spanish universities and has the same entry requirements. At UNED, undergraduate students study independently using official course materials provided online or by mail, such as textbooks, study guides, exercises, and multimedia resources. Because UNED is a distance learning university, students must organize their own study schedules and manage their time carefully to keep up with the course content. They can also attend online or in-person tutoring sessions and participate in forums or study groups to clarify doubts and practice.

When it comes to exams, students must register in advance to take their tests at official UNED examination centers located in various cities across Spain and internationally. Exams usually take place at the end of each semester and can be written, oral, or a combination, depending on the subject. During the exam, students are required to demonstrate their understanding of the material by answering questions or completing exercises within a fixed time.

Importantly, all exams are supervised by proctors at these examination centers. The supervisors verify student identity, ensure that exam rules are followed, and monitor the exam room to prevent cheating or any unfair behavior. This supervision guarantees the integrity and fairness of the evaluation process. While some courses may include continuous assessment through assignments or online activities, the final supervised exams are the main method used to evaluate students and award credits toward their degrees.

== International presence ==
UNED currently has 61 study centers in Spain and - with the co-operation of local institutions - 14 international centers. These locations provide face-to-face sessions with professors once a week. The international centers are located in Bata, Bern, Brussels, Buenos Aires, Caracas, Frankfurt, Lima, London, Malabo, Mexico City, Paris and São Paulo. There are exam points in Bogotá, Berlin, New York, Rome, Santiago de Chile and Warsaw.

=== Affiliation ===
In 2012 the Spanish newspaper El País featured an article about the launch of UNX, an online platform for teaching entrepreneurship through building mobile apps with App Inventor. UNED is a collaborating partner in this project, along with the Massachusetts Institute of Technology Center for Mobile Learning. The UNX online courses are intended to bring technology and entrepreneurship education about to the entire Spanish-speaking world.

== Academic profile ==
A number of factors have been cited to justify the public prestige of UNED:

- All of UNED exams are supervised
- Exams must encompass the entirety of the program
- Students are objectively graded based on a strictly uniform test
- Distance learning requires additional self-teaching effort and discipline, highly regarded by employers
- Students from UNED are more likely to continue their education and research after graduation day, applying the self-teaching methodologies learned during their studies

In the last 30 years, UNED has awarded almost 2,000 PhD degrees.

Its international reputation is indicated in that it has held the UNESCO chair in distance education since 1997. This chair promotes research, development and documentation in the field of distance education.

== Organization ==
=== Undergraduate ===
Today, UNED comprises 11 faculties and the following bachelor's degree studies:

- Higher Technical School of Computer Engineering at UNED: Bachelor's Degree in Computer Engineering, Bachelor's Degree in Engineering Information Technology
- College of Industrial Engineering: Bachelor's Degree in Electrical Engineering, Bachelor's Degree in Industrial Technologies Engineering, Bachelor's Degree in Mechanical Engineering, Bachelor's Degree in Engineering in Industrial Electronics and Automation
- Faculty of Sciences: Bachelor's Degree in Environmental Science, Bachelor's Degree in Physics, Bachelor's Degree in Mathematics, Bachelor's Degree in Chemistry
- Faculty of Economics and Business Administration: Bachelor's Degree in Economics, Bachelor's Degree in Business Administration and Management, Bachelor's Degree in Tourism
- Faculty of Political Science and Sociology: Bachelor's Degree in Sociology, Bachelor's Degree in Political Science & Public Administration
- Faculty of Law: Bachelor's Degree in Law, Bachelor's Degree in Social Work, Bachelor's Degree in Juridical Science of Public Administration
- Faculty of Education: Bachelor's Degree in Social Education, Bachelor's Degree in Pedagogy
- Faculty of Philology: Bachelor's Degree in Spanish Language and Literature, Bachelor's Degree in English Studies: Language, Literature and Culture
- Faculty of Philosophy: Bachelor's Degree in Philosophy, Bachelor's Degree in Social and Cultural Anthropology
- Faculty of Geography and History: Bachelor's Degree in Geography and History, Bachelor's Degree in Art History
- Faculty of Psychology: Bachelor's Degree in Psychology

=== Postgraduate ===
- Higher Technical School of Computer Engineering at UNED: Computer Systems and Languages, Advanced Artificial Intelligence: Principles, Methods and Applications, Communication, Networks and Content Management, Systems and Control Engineering
- College of Industrial Engineering: Research in Industrial Technology, Research in Electrical, Electronic and Industrial Control Engineering, Advanced Manufacturing Engineering, Design Engineering
- Faculty of Sciences: Chemical Science and Technology, Polymer Science and Technology, Advanced Mathematics, Medical Physics, Physics of Complex Systems
- Faculty of Economics and Business Administration: Corporate Sustainability and Social, Responsibility
- Faculty of Political Science and Sociology, Social Problems, Politics and Democracy,
- Faculty of Law: Government Intervention in Society, European Union, Fundamental Rights, Security, Insurance Law, Human Rights, Public Management, Public Finance, Public Policy and Taxation
- Faculty of Education Educational Treatment of Diversity, Communication and Education on the Internet: From the Information Society to the Knowledge Society, Innovation and Research in Education, Training of E.S.O., Bachillerato, F.P. and Language Secondary Teachers, Strategies and Technologies for the Teaching Function in the Multicultural Society
- Faculty of Philology: English Literary and Cultural studies and their Social Impact, Literary and Theatre Training and Research in the European Context, The Classical World and its Influence on Western Culture, Applied English Linguistics, Hispanic Literatures (Catalan, Galician and Basque) in the European Context, Language Science and Hispanic Linguistics, Grammatical and Stylistic Analysis of Spanish, Dictionary Development and Quality Control of the Spanish Lexicon, French and Francophone Studies, Information Technologies and Communication in Language Education and Processing
- Faculty of Philosophy :Theoretical and Practical Philosophy
- Faculty of Geography and History : Advanced Methods and Techniques of Historical, Artistic and Geographic Research, Contemporary Spain in the International Context
- Faculty of Psychology :Methodology of Behavioral Sciences and Health, Research in Psychology, Psychological Intervention in Development and Education

== People ==
=== Notable current and former academics ===
- Ana María Vázquez Hoys
- José Mira Mira
- Ramon Sainero
- Paco Vidarte
- César Alierta
- Javier Paniagua Fuentes
- Juan Manuel Rozas
- Vicenç Mateu Zamora
- Enrique Fuentes Quintana
- Alfonso Vallejo
- José María Moreno
- Ángel Ballesteros Gallardo
- Gustavo Fuertes
- Emilio Lledó
- Edith Checa
- Domingo Vega de la Rosa
- Trinidad Jiménez

=== Notable alumni ===
- Nadia Calviño
- Pablo Hernández de Cos
- Ana Estrella Santos
- Ramiro Villapadierna
- Christina Ochoa
- Xavi Valero
- Tomás Marco
- Amaia Montero
- David Janer
- Mónica Naranjo
- Maria Verónica Reina, disability activist
- Paloma García Ovejero
- Lucas Platero, Spanish educator and researcher

=== Honorary doctors ===
1985–1990	1991–2000	2001–2010	2011–present
Ilya Prigogine (1985); José Ferrater Mora (1986); Alan Roy Katritzky (1986); Hermann Haken (1987); Rafael Lapesa (1987); Paul Anthony Samuelson (1989); Merton H. Miller (1990)	Jordi Solé Tura (1991); Miquel Roca I Junyent (1991); José Pedro Pérez-Llorca (1991); Gregorio Peces-Barba (1991); Miguel Herrero y Rodríguez de Miñón (1991); Manuel Fraga Iribarne (1991); Gabriel Cisneros (1991); Max Kaser (1992); Mario Talamanca (1992); Miquel Batllori i Munné (1993); Manuel Alvar López (1993); Adolfo Sánchez Vázquez (1993); Bernard Pottier (1993); Kenneth S.W. Sing (1996); José Luis Pinillos Díaz (1996); Hermann Mosler (1996); Jay Seth Rosenblatt (1997); Derek Ernest Blackman (1997); Francisco Ayala y García-Duarte (1997); Manuel Royes I Vila (1998); Emilio Alarcos Llorach (1998); José María Álvarez del Manzano (1998); Manuel Lora-Tamayo (1998); Carlos Fuentes Macías (2000); Karl Johan Åström (2000); Philip N. Johnson-Laird (2000)	Rafael Canogar (2001); Daniel E. Rosner (2002); Fernando Reinoso Suárez (2002); Antonio Béthencourt Massieu (2003); Mozart Víctor Russomano (2003); Jean Rouverol (2003); Marye Anne Fox (2003); Salustiano del Campo Urbano (2005); Marc Barbut (2005); Gianni Vattimo (2006); Susan George (2007); Ulrich Beck (2007); Juan Velarde Fuentes (2007); Manuel Varela Parache (2007); Enrique Fuentes Quintana (2007); Avelino Corma Canós (2008); María Cascales Angosto (2008); Juan Bechmans Vallet de Goytisolo (2009); Helio Carpintero (2009); Ramón Bayes Sopena (2009); Humberto López Morales (2010); Jean Haritschelhar (2010); Antoni Mª Badia i Margarit (2010); Xesús Alonso Montero (2010); Federico Mayor Zaragoza (2010); Ricardo Diez Hochleitner (2010)	Hans Küng (2011); Santiago Grisolía García (2011); Margarita Salas (2011); Juan Díez Nicolás (2012); Victorio Valle Sánchez (2013); José Manuel Caballero Bonald (2013); Eduard H. Hovy (2013); Göran Therborn (2014); James W. Fernandez (2015); Stanley Brandes (2015); Salvador Giner (2016); Pedro Duque (2016); Per-Olof H. Wilkström (2017); Giuseppe de Vergottini (2018); Ángel López García-Molins (2018); José Elguero Bertolini (2019); Maria Ziółek (2019); Darío Villanueva Prieto (2020); Almudena Grandes Hernández (2020)

== Educational media ==
=== Radio programs (selected) ===
UNED hosted several educational radio programs, broadcast internationally on Radio 3 of RNE. Edith Checa was the director and announcer of the following from 1989 to 2005:

- Rincón literario: tus poemas por las ondas - Weekly poetry radio show
- Informativo Universitario

=== Television (selected) ===
Educational documentaries were broadcast internationally on La 2 on TVE and on TVE Internacional. Edith Checa was a presenter and writer. Recordings of the shows are hosted on the UNED Documentos YouTube channel.

- Literary Rincón
- Ayer y hoy en la poesía - bi-weekly television program about poetry

== See also ==
- UNED Associated Centre of Pontevedra
- Tuition fees in Spain
