= Ana Vázquez =

Ana Vázquez can refer to:

- Ana Paula Vázquez
- Ana María Vázquez Hoys
