= Juan Carlos Fresnadillo =

Spanish film director, script writer, and producer

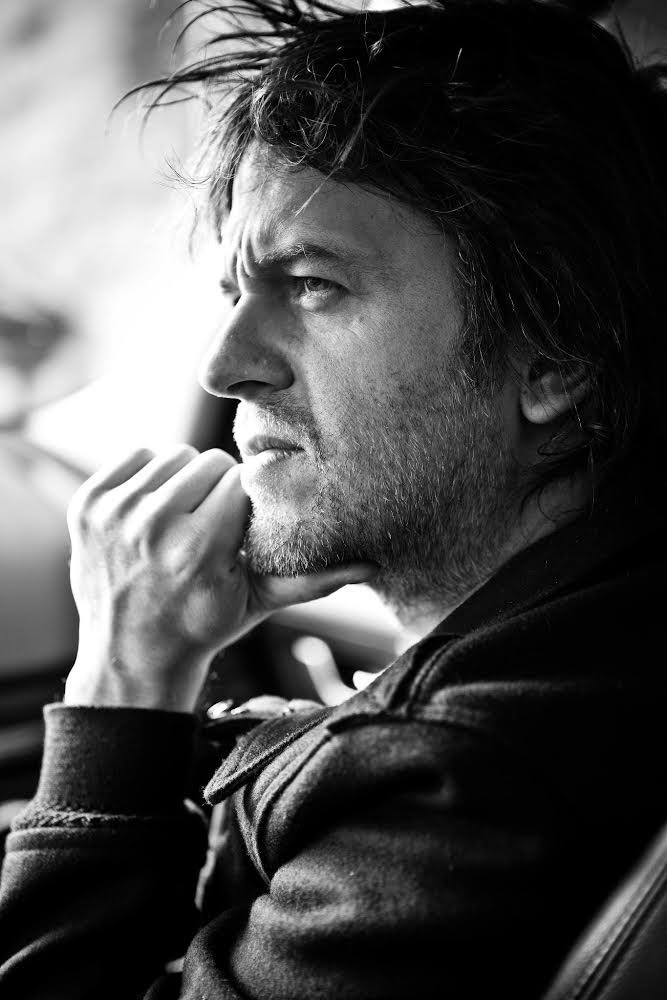
- Fresnadillo in 2002
- Born: 5 December 1967 (age 58); Santa Cruz de Tenerife, Canary Islands, Spain
- Occupations: Director, producer, writer
- Years active: 1986–present

Juan Carlos Fresnadillo (born 5 December 1967) is a Spanish film director, script writer, and producer. He directed Intacto and 28 Weeks Later, the sequel to Danny Boyle's 28 Days Later. His film Esposados was nominated for the Academy Award for Best Live Action Short Film in 1996.

== Biography ==
=== Early life ===
Fresnadillo was born in Santa Cruz de Tenerife, Canary Islands. In 1977, at the age of nine, he witnessed the aftermath of the Tenerife airport disaster, which in part inspired his 2001 film Intacto. In 1985, Fresnadillo moved to Madrid.

=== Movie career ===
He started out in photography and cinema studies and then began his career in short films. In 1987, he set up a production company which produced several short films and commercials. Fresnadillo went on to become a production assistant for Gustavo Fuertes' short film El juicio final (1991) (U.S. title The Final Judgement).

In 1996, he made his directorial debut with the black-and-white short film Esposados (U.S. title: Linked), for which he was also the executive producer. This black comedy tells the story of a couple who are constantly fighting over money; when they find themselves winning the Christmas lottery, however, they have such different ideas about what to do next that the husband tries to get rid of his wife. Esposados won 40 national and international awards. It was also nominated for an Academy Award for Best Short Film in the same year, making Fresnadillo an overnight star in Spain.

In 2001, he directed his first full-length picture, the thriller Intacto. The film received several awards, most notably two 2002 Goya Awards (one of them for Fresnadillo in the category of Best New Director) and six further Goya nominations.

Fresnadillo then completed the 3-minute black-and-white picture Psicotaxi (2002), starring and portraying Alejandro Jodorowsky.

In 2006, he directed 28 Weeks Later, the sequel to Danny Boyle's 2002 film 28 Days Later.

On 7 April 2011, it was announced that he would be directing and co-writing the screenplay for the remake of The Crow. In October 2011, news broke that Fresnadillo was no longer attached to the Crow remake.

On 25 August 2014, Variety reported that Fresnadillo was in talks to develop and possibly direct a thriller titled The Last Witness about the lone survivor of a bomb attack in Boston.

== Filmography ==
Short film

Year	Title	Director	Writer	Executive Producer
1991	El extraño pacto	Yes	Yes	No
1996	Esposados	Yes	Yes	Yes
2002	Psicotaxi	Yes	No	No
2019	4X	Yes	No	No

Feature film

Year	Title	Director	Writer
2002	Intacto	Yes	Yes
2007	28 Weeks Later	Yes	Yes
2011	Intruders	Yes	No
2012	La senda	No	Yes
2024	Damsel	Yes	No

Television

Year	Title	Director	Executive Producer	Notes
1990	Blanco	Yes	No	TV movie
2016	Falling Water	Yes	Yes	Episode "Don't Tell Bill"
2016	Prototype	Yes	Yes	TV movie
2017	Salvation	Yes	Yes	Episode "Pilot"

== See also ==
- List of Spanish Academy Award winners and nominees
