= Semana Negra =

Series of annual literary festivals in Spain

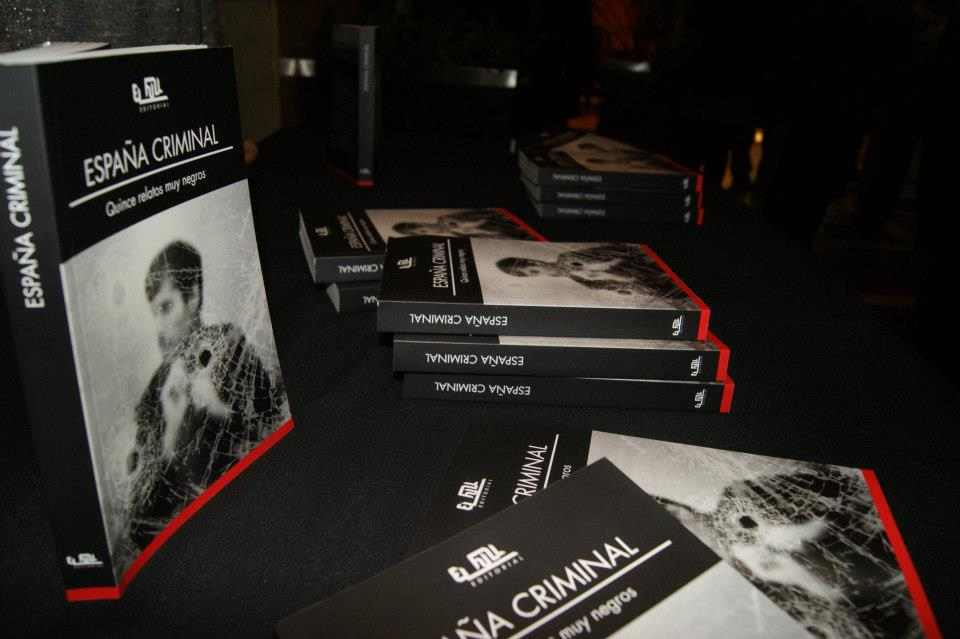

In Spain, a Semana Negra ("black week") is a literary festival that celebrates crime fiction and detective stories with a variety of events for literature, cinema, theater, photography and gastronomy. The term "black week" refers to how the week-long festivals focus on the genre of literature that deals with "darker" subject matters.

== Aragón Negro ==
The Aragón Negro Festival, colloquially known as Aragón Negro, is a literary festival that was started in 2014 by writer and journalist Juan Bolea and is celebrated throughout the Aragón, Spain. It is sponsored by the Caja Rural de Aragón Foundation, Cafés Orús, and the Zaragoza City Council, in addition to various private sponsors. After the first year, the festival expanded to include cities like Zaragoza, Huesca, Calatayud, Pina de Ebro, and Valderrobres.

The festival features presentations and literary debates with leading authors, as well as theatrical performances.

== Barcelona Negra ==
Barcelona Negra, better known as BCNegra was conceived in 2005 and has been held in Barcelona, Spain every year since 2006.

The bookseller Paco Camarasa, founder and owner of the Black and Criminal Bookstore of Barcelona, started the festival in 2005, taking advantage of the fact that the Barcelona City Council was celebrating the Year of the Book and dedicated several events to the memory of the Spanish novelist Manuel Vázquez Montalbán. These meetings were a success with the public, encouraging the bookseller to propose an annual festival dedicated to the noir genre.

== Blacklladolid ==
Blacklladolid began in 2021, in the last week of September. It was held at the Fuensaldaña castle. Since then, the festival as had the goal of promoting the province of Valladolid, Spain.

== Castelló Negre ==
This festival is known officially and in Valencia as the Castelló Negre, and also called the Castellón Negro. It began in 2010.

== Collbató Negre ==
Collbató Negre

== Getafe Negro ==
In Madrid, the Getafe Negro began in 2008.

== Granada Noir ==
The Andalucían festival was first held in 2015 and will include the award of the first Granada Noir prize.

== Pamplona Negra ==
Pamplona Negra

== Semana Negra de Gijón ==
Semana Negra de Gijón began in 1988. It initially dealt only with crime fiction but has expanded to other genres including science fiction, fantasy and historical fiction.

== Valencia Negra ==
Officially known as the Festival de Género Negro de Valencia, colloquially known as Valencia Negra or VLC Negra.
