= Maria Verónica Reina =

Disability rights activist

Maria Verónica Reina (15 June 1964 – 27 October 2017) was an Argentine educational psychologist and activist who campaigned internationally for disability rights. Representing the International Disability and Development Consortium, she was a leading contributor to negotiations on the United Nations Convention on the Rights of Persons with Disabilities.

== Early life ==
Born in Argentina in 15 June 1964, Maria Verónica Reina was disabled in a car accident at the age of 17 when she was in her final year at school. After a period in hospital, she was nevertheless able to complete her schooling. She had hoped to become a teacher but was refused entry to educational studies as disabled persons were not authorized to teach in Argentina. She managed to overcome these difficulties by opting for educational psychology, graduating from the Universidad Católica de Santa Fe (Catholic University of Santa Fe) in Special Education for School Integration. She went on to earn a master's degree in Open and Distance Learning and Teaching from Spain's National University of Distance Education.

== Career ==
Reina developed experience working in a variety of institutions, including the University Institute San Martin in Rosario, Argentina; the Argentinean Disabled People Organization, Cilsa; the Center for International Rehabilitation, Chicago (1997); the Institute for International Disability Advocacy; the Institute for International Cooperation and Development; the Institute for International Disability Advocacy; and the Center for International Rehabilitation.

She served as director of international projects at Syracuse University's Burton Blatt Institute (BBI) in Washington D.C. from 2006. In 2008, with the support of both BBI and the World Bank, she was appointed as the first Executive Director of the Global Partnership for Disability and Development. The partnership set out to promote the inclusion of disabled people into policies and practices through development agencies. She was particularly active in the United Nations Ad Hoc Committee for the Disability Convention.

In negotiations on the UN Convention, she involved disability organizations worldwide in her commitment to universal human rights for those with disabilities in an inclusive, accessible and sustainable world. In her role as Coordinator of the International Disability Caucus she represented people with disabilities during the negotiations. She effectively moderated communications and achieved consensus among stakeholders with differing interests. She chaired meetings and conferences, moderated communications and coordinated the translation and distribution documentation in Spanish for Latin American.

In the months before she died, she helped to promote the effectiveness of the Stakeholder Group of Persons with Disabilities under the International Disability Alliance. At a United Nations consultative meeting in Buenos Aires, she sought to reinforce the role of the disability community in implementing the Convention on the Rights of Persons with Disabilities.

Maria Verónica Reina died in her hometown, Rosario, on 27 October 2017. She was 54 years old.
