= UNED Associated Centre of Pontevedra =

University in Pontevedra, Spain

- Centro Asociado de la UNED de Pontevedra
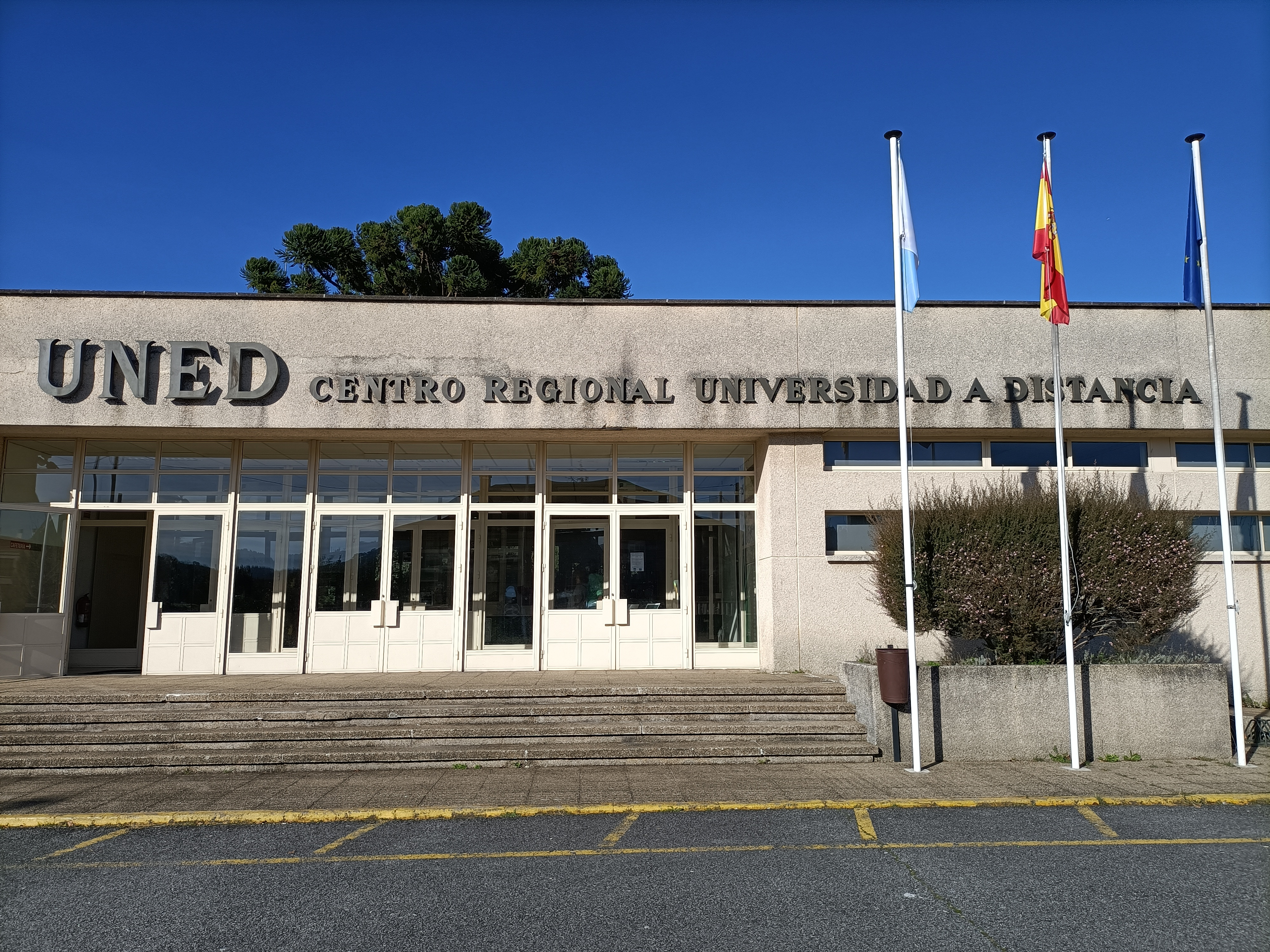
- UNED Centre in Pontevedra
- Former names: Centro Regional de la UNED in Galicia
- Motto: Omnibus mobilibus mobilior sapientia
- Type: Public University
- Established: 1973
- Affiliations: National University of Distance Education
- Director: Victor Manuel González Sánchez
- Total staff: 162
- Students: 4,500
- Location: Pontevedra, Province of Pontevedra, Galicia, Spain; 42°26′33.3″N 8°37′32.6″W
- Campus: Northwest
- Website: unedpontevedra.com
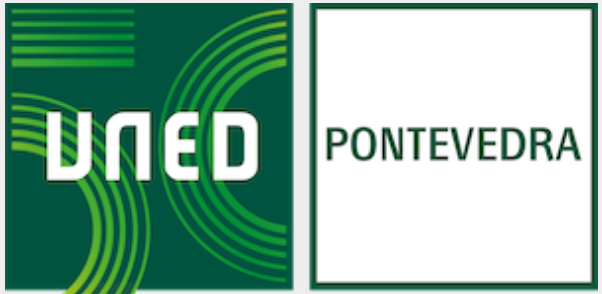

The UNED Associated Centre in Pontevedra (UNED Pontevedra) is a university teaching centre of the National University of Distance Education (UNED) located in the Spanish city of Pontevedra. It is part of UNED's North-West Campus and is its most important centre.

It is the first headquarters of UNED in Galicia, originally called the Regional Centre of UNED in Galicia.

== Location ==
The UNED Associated Centre in Pontevedra is located at 1 Portugal Street in the Monte Porreiro neighbourhood of Pontevedra.

== History ==
The steps for the creation of the UNED centre in Pontevedra started in 1972 thanks to the will of the Provincial Council of Pontevedra, the Municipality of Pontevedra and the Provincial Savings Bank of Pontevedra. It was the first associated centre of UNED in Galicia and the second in Spain. At the time of its inauguration, it was the only associated centre in Galicia, Asturias and León, regions to which it extended its territorial scope.

The university centre was created by ministerial decree on 12 January 1973 and opened its doors in the Virgen Peregrina Student Residence (currently the Abanca Student Residence), which lent it several offices and classrooms. The inauguration took place on 12 March 1973, in the presence of the Rector of the University of Santiago de Compostela and the Civil Governor of Pontevedra.

Its first year began with the teaching of two university degrees, law and philosophy and humanities. The university centre had 350 students at the time. Its first director, from 1973 to 1975, was José Antonio Souto Paz, professor of law at the University of Santiago de Compostela. In 1974, seven more courses were introduced. During the academic year 1974–1975, the UNED headquarters were temporarily transferred to two floors of the central building of the Provincial Savings Bank of Pontevedra, in the Campolongo neighbourhood, and 1,188 students enrolled.

On 23 October 1987, UNED moved to its definitive headquarters in the city, a new 7,000 square metre building in the Monte Porreiro neighbourhood, on an estate of over 20,000 square metres surrounded by gardens with remarkable trees. In this academic year there were more than 3,000 students and in the 1992–1993 academic year there were more than 4,000 students.

On 7 December 1994, the UNED Associated Centre in Pontevedra was integrated into the basic network of UNED Associated Centres (this means that all the studies offered by the UNED at national level are taught and can be studied at the Associated Centre). From 2007 onwards, several branches (called Aulas Universitarias) were created in the province of Pontevedra, dependent on the headquarters in Pontevedra. In 2007 the Lalín branch was created, in 2010 the Tui branch, in 2012 the Vigo branch, in 2017 the Portas branch and in 2022 the O Porriño branch.

In September 2020, the UNED Associated Centre in Pontevedra became the headquarters of the UNED North-Western Spanish Campus, which coordinates the 14 UNED Associated Centres in Galicia, Asturias, Castile and León and Extremadura (Pontevedra, A Coruña, Ourense, Lugo, Gijón, Ávila, Burgos, Palencia, Ponferrada, Segovia, Soria, Zamora, Mérida and Plasencia).

== Description ==
With 4,500 students, the UNED centre in Pontevedra is the associate centre with the most students in Galicia. It offers 30 university degrees, 13 languages in the CUID and the university admission course for the over-25s.The most popular courses are Psychology and Law.

The university courses that can be followed at the university centre are the following : Business administration, Social anthropology, Environmental sciences, Legal sciences of Public administration, Nursery school teaching, Physics, Mathematics, Political sciences and Public administration, Criminology, Chemistry, Law, Economics, Social education, English studies (language, literature, culture), Spanish language and literature, Philosophy, History and Geography, Art history, Computer engineering, Information technology engineering, Mechanical engineering, Industrial electronic and automatic engineering, Electrical engineering, Industrial technological engineering, Energy engineering, Pedagogy, Psychology, Sociology, Social work and Tourism. The centre also provides 80% of the UNED's university extension courses in Spain. The UNED centre in Pontevedra has also been offering summer courses without interruption since 1989.

The UNED Associate Centre in Pontevedra is the largest Spanish centre on the UNED North West Campus. The building has three floors and an inner courtyard, 4 parlours, a computer room, a library, 30 classrooms, laboratories (for physics, chemistry, biology, psychology, engineering, mathematics and computer science), a meeting room, a bookshop, a cafeteria and a 600 square metre amphitheatre inaugurated in March 2016.

A large mural of more than 12 metres in length by the artist Manuel Moldes, painted in 1987, decorates one side of the hall on the first floor of the UNED building.

The Governing Board of the University Centre of Pontevedra is composed of the following bodies: UNED, the Provincial Council of Pontevedra, the City Council of Pontevedra, the Xunta de Galicia and the company ENCE.

== Gallery ==
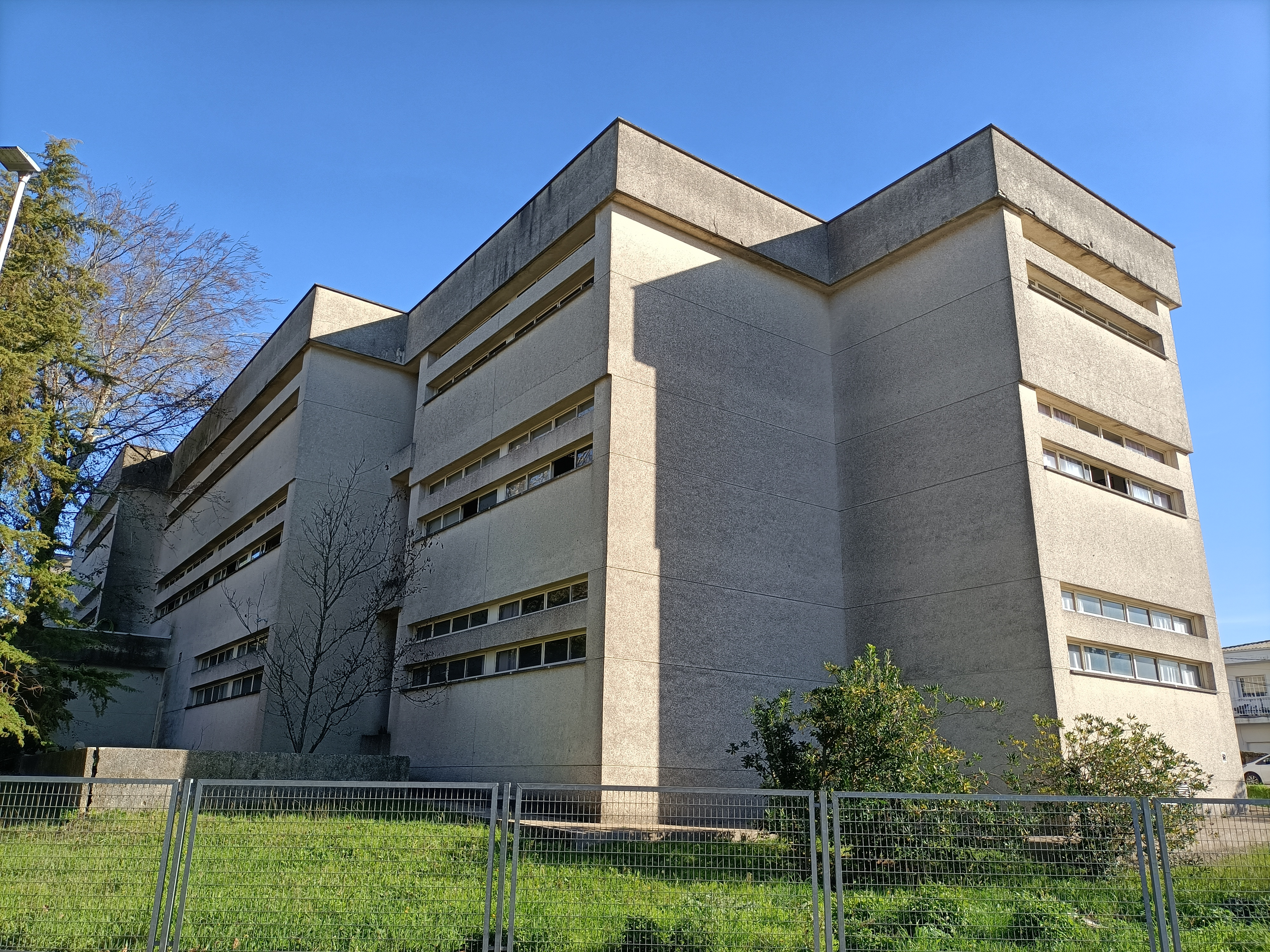
West façade of the Associate Centre of the UNED in Pontevedra

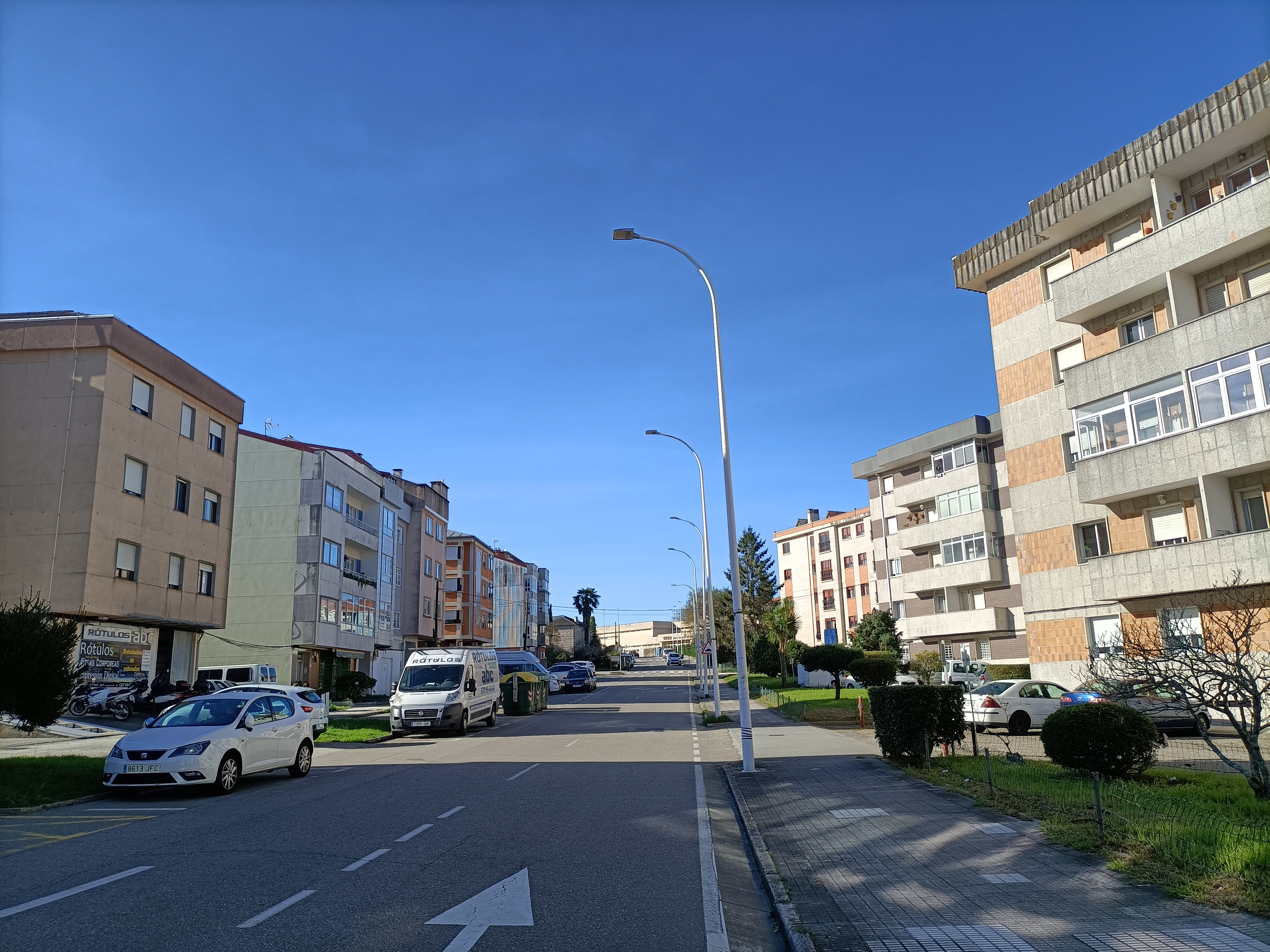
UNED Centre at the end of Portugal Street

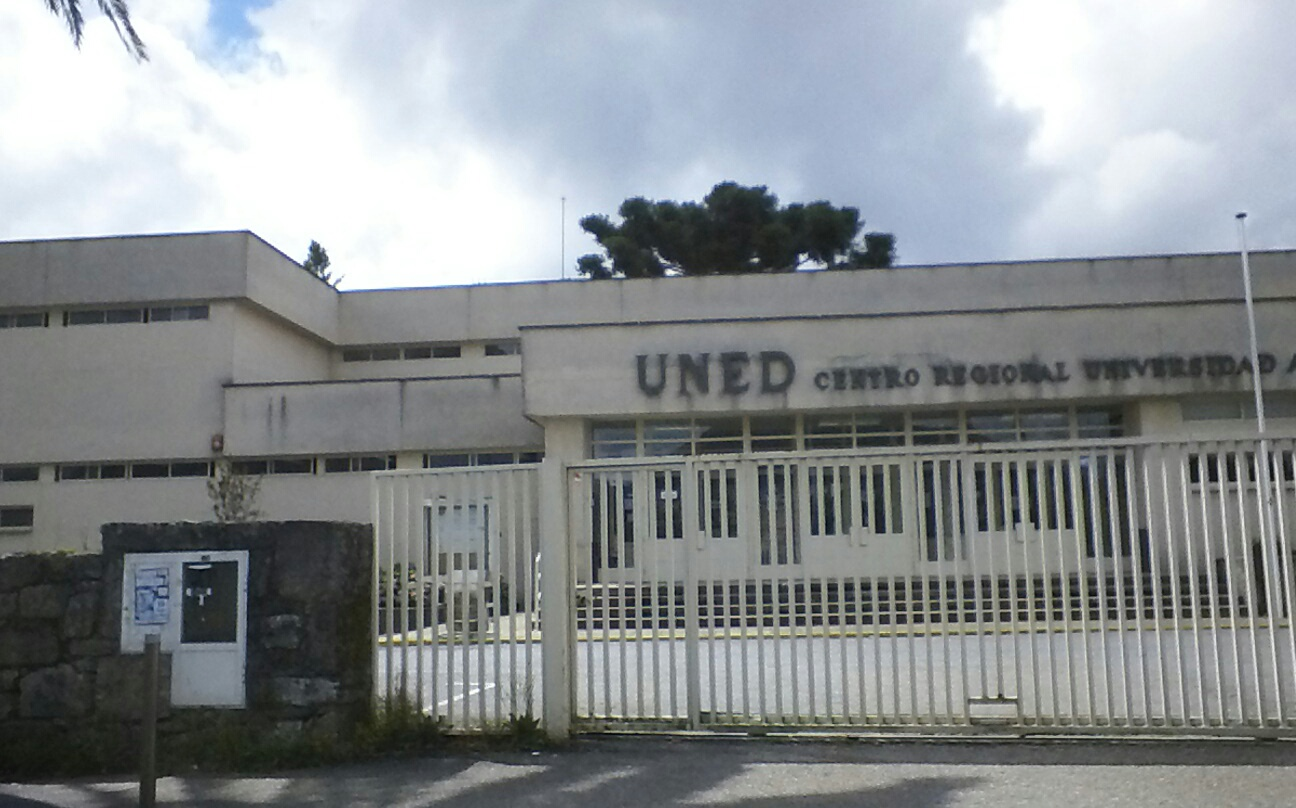
Headquarters of the UNED Associated Centre in Pontevedra

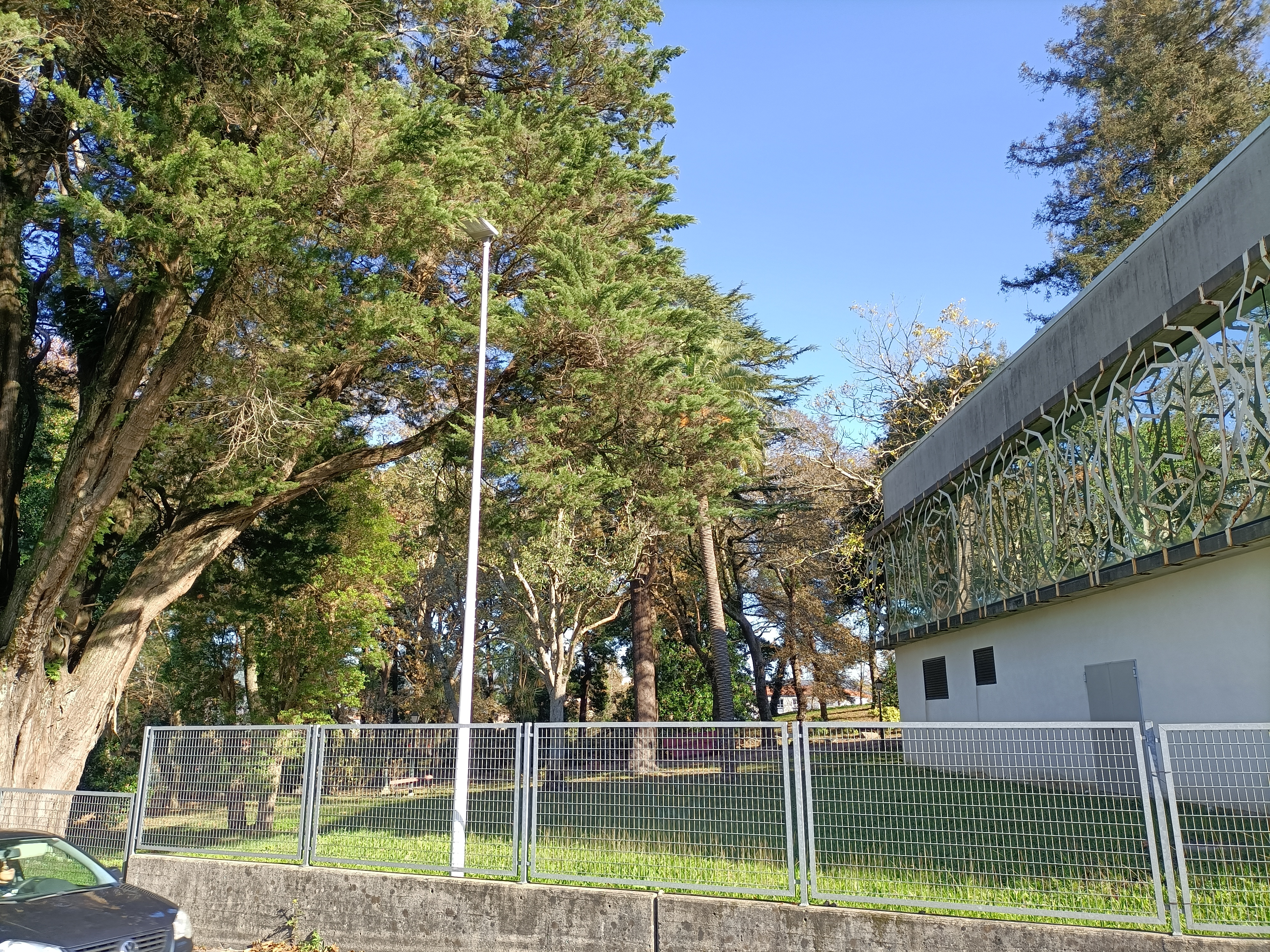
Aula Magna and UNED Park

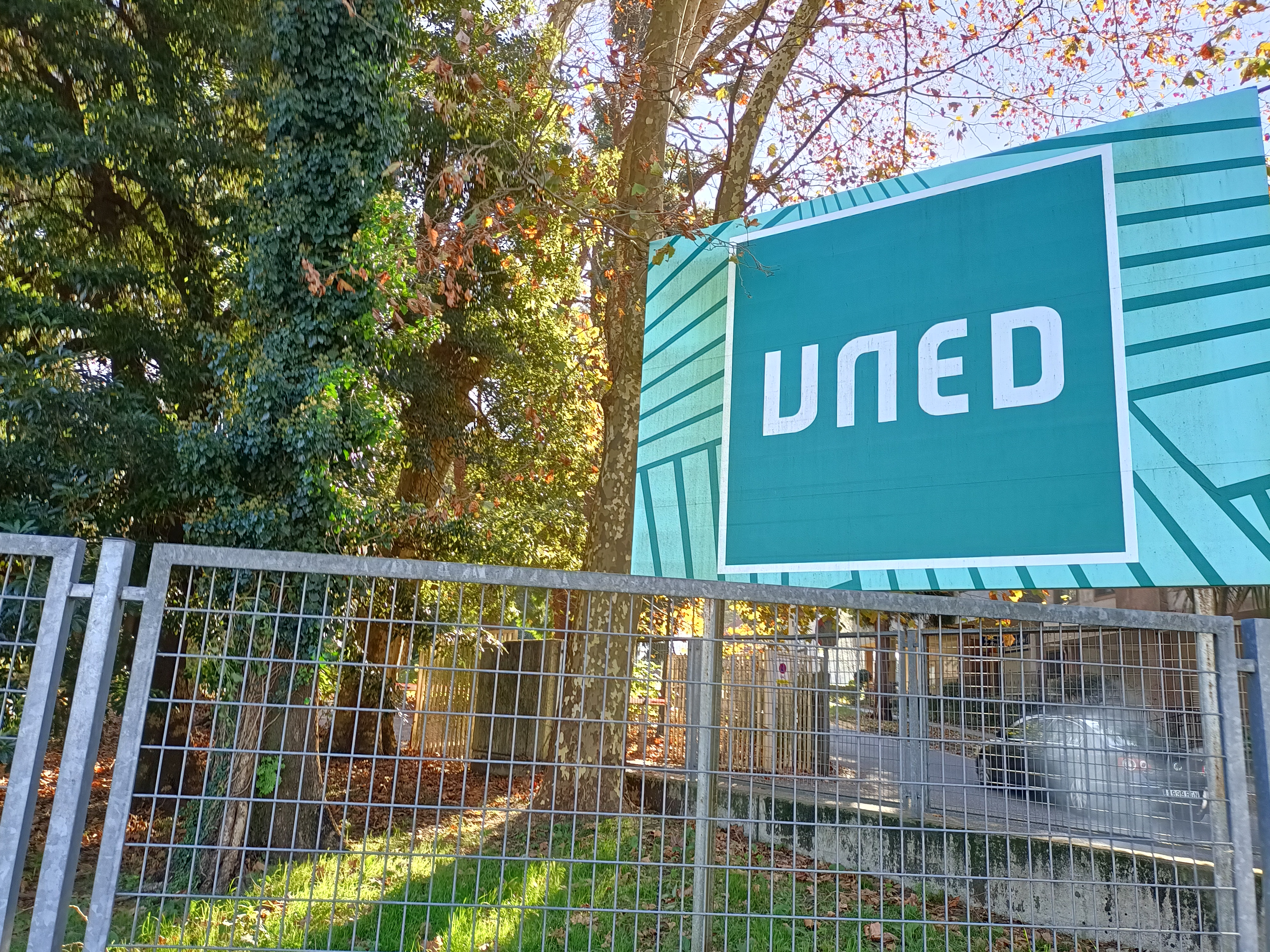
UNED Park

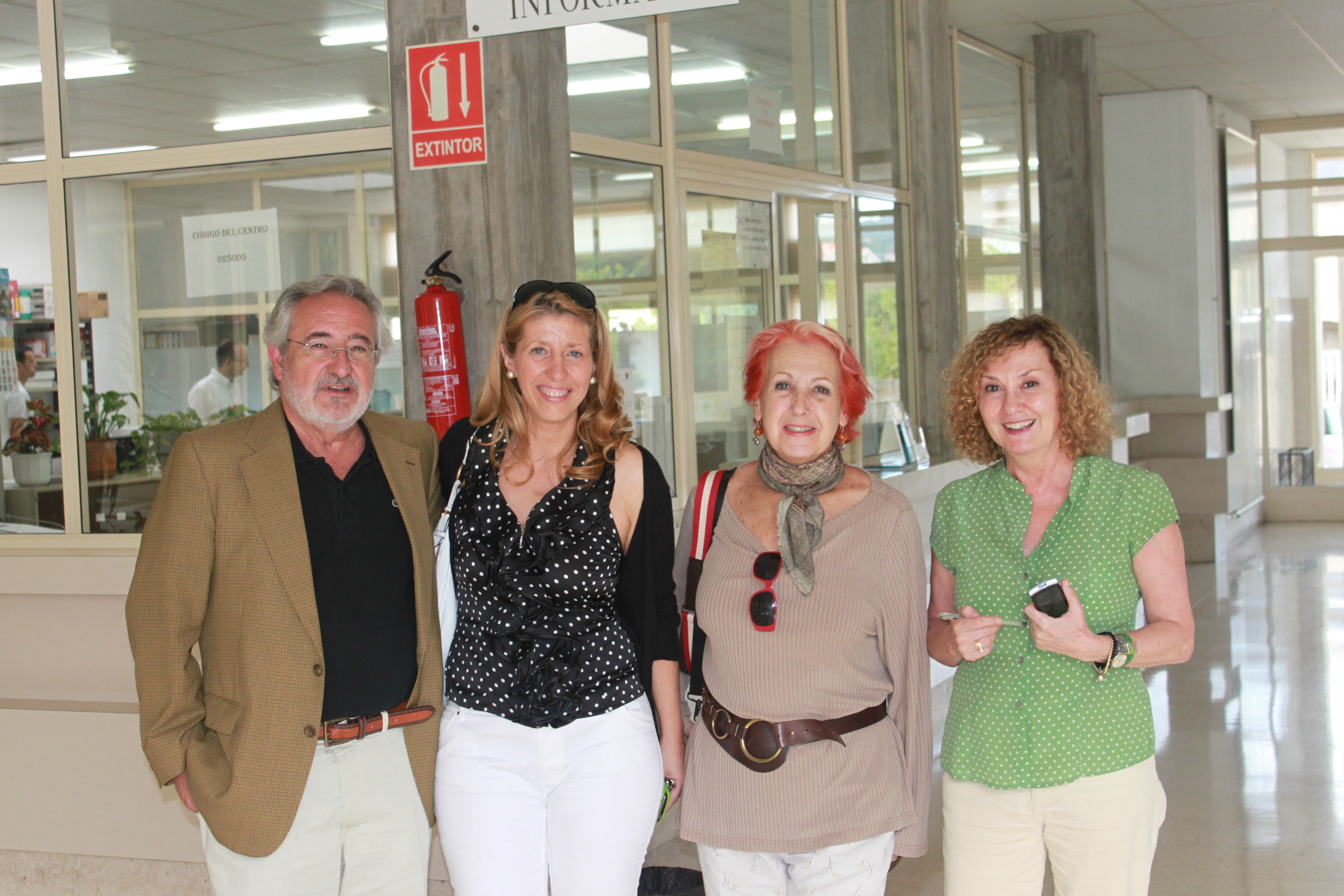
The journalist Rosa María Calaf at the UNED centre in Pontevedra

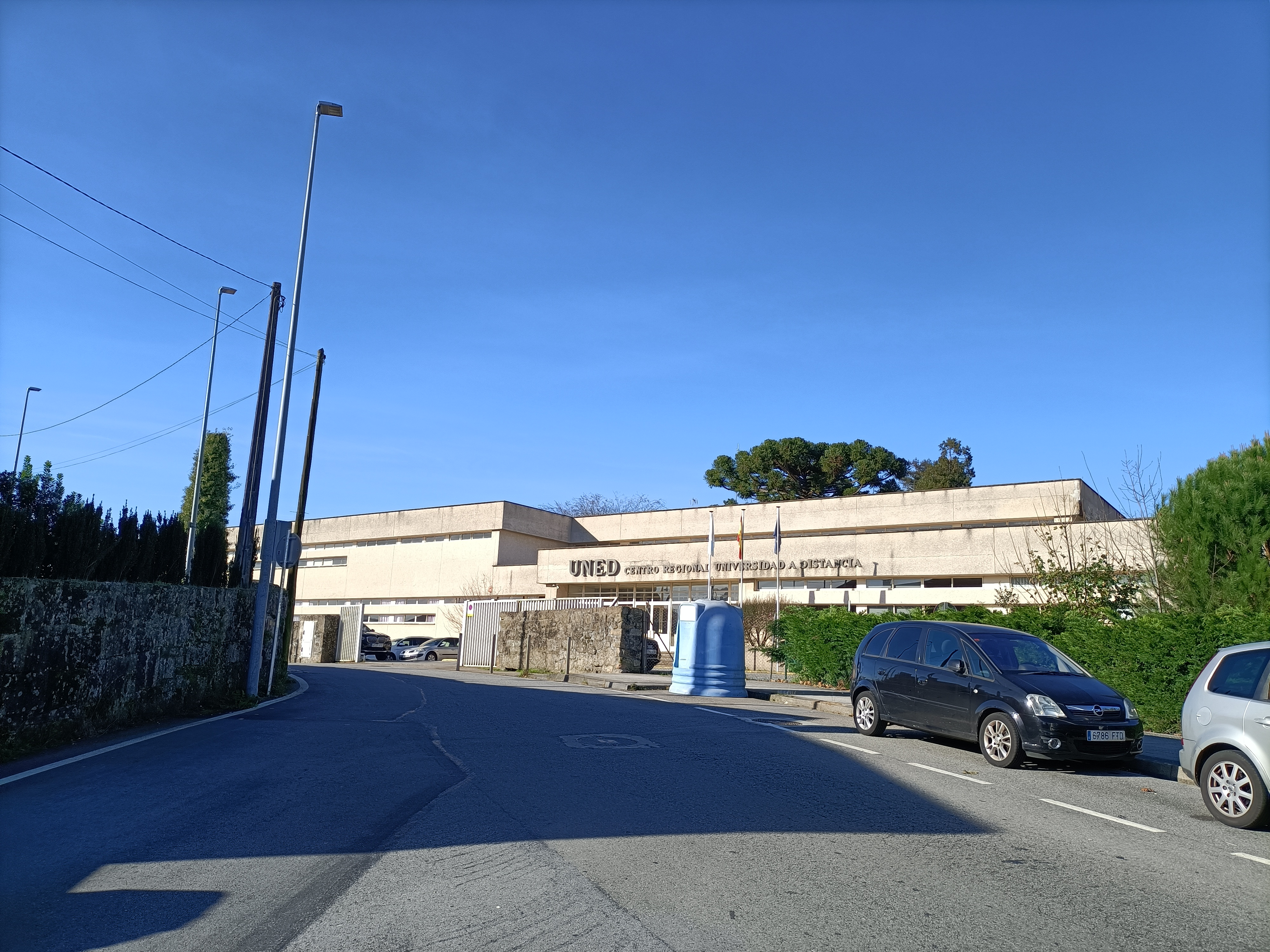
UNED Centre in Pontevedra

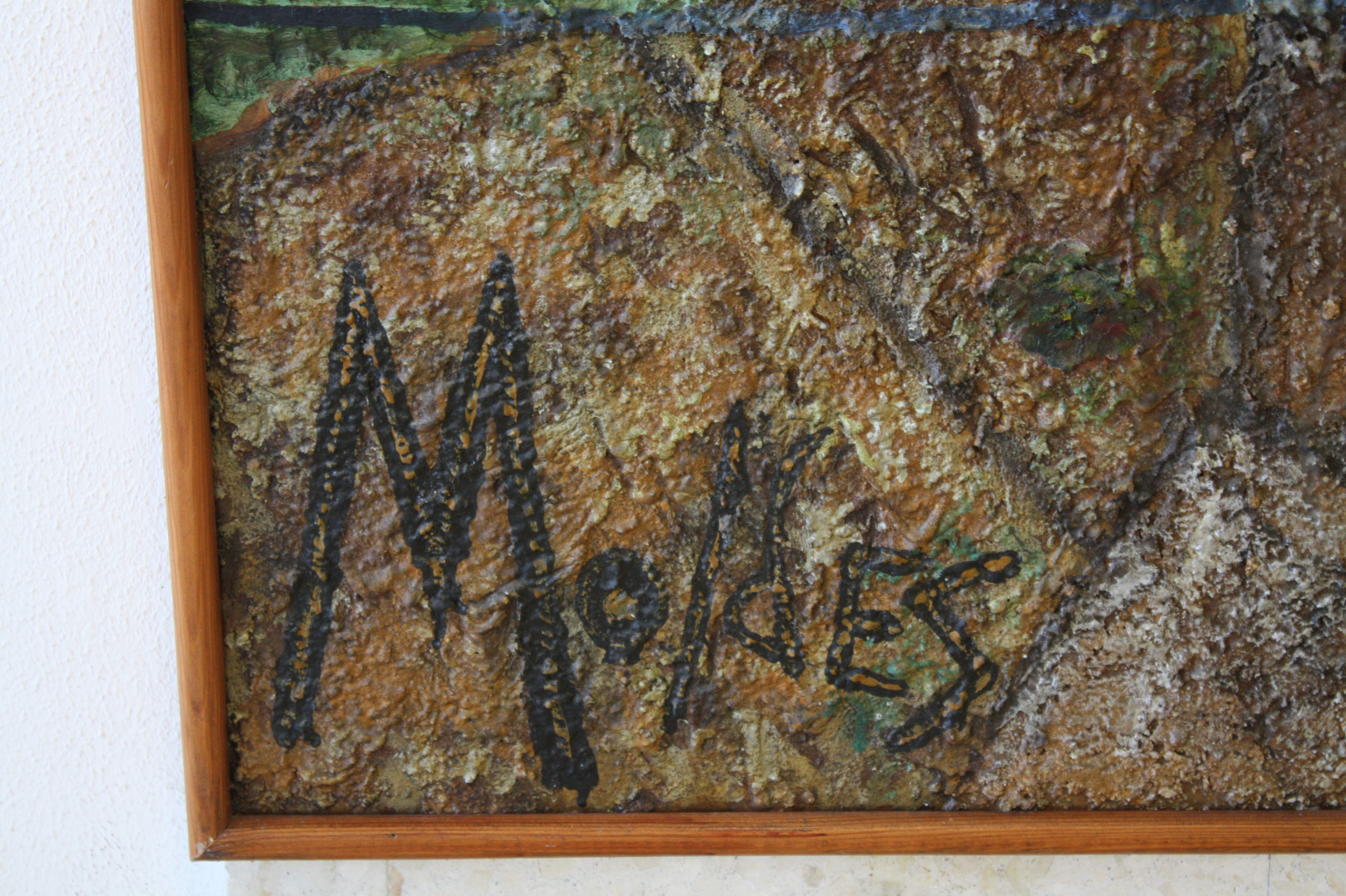
Detail of the mural by Manuel Moldes inside the UNED centre in Pontevedra

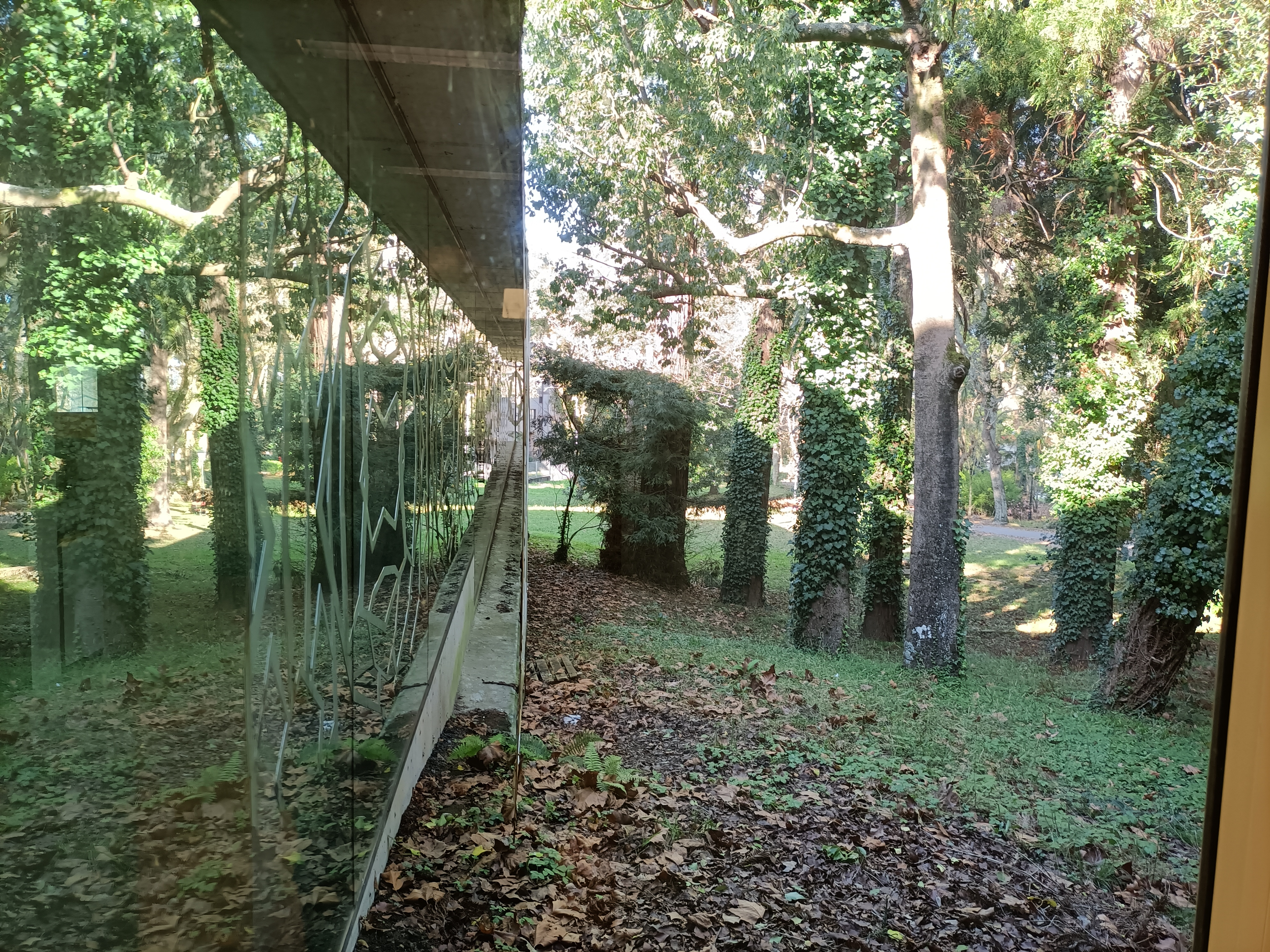
Park and side of the Aula Magna

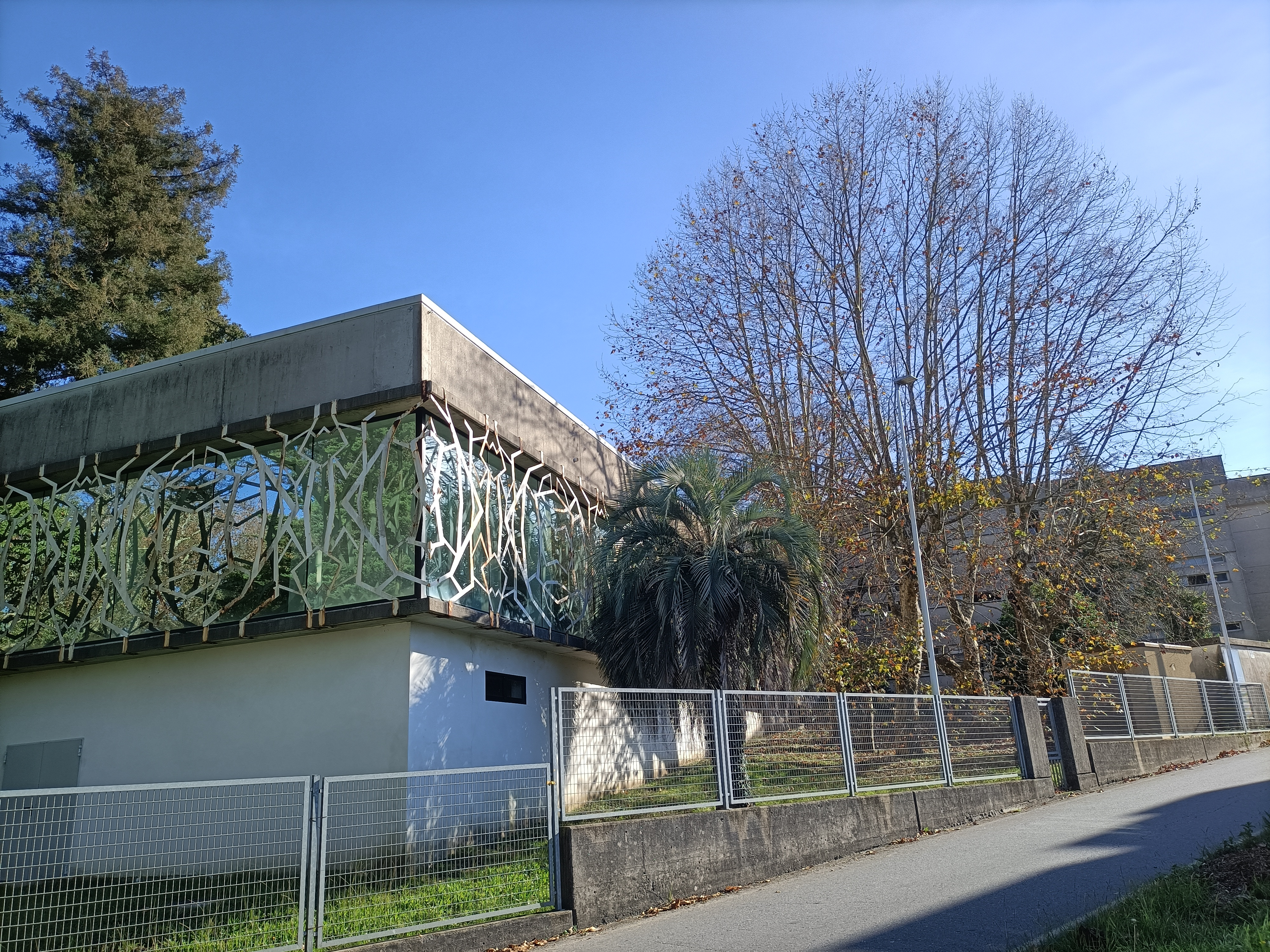
Aula Magna and main building in the background

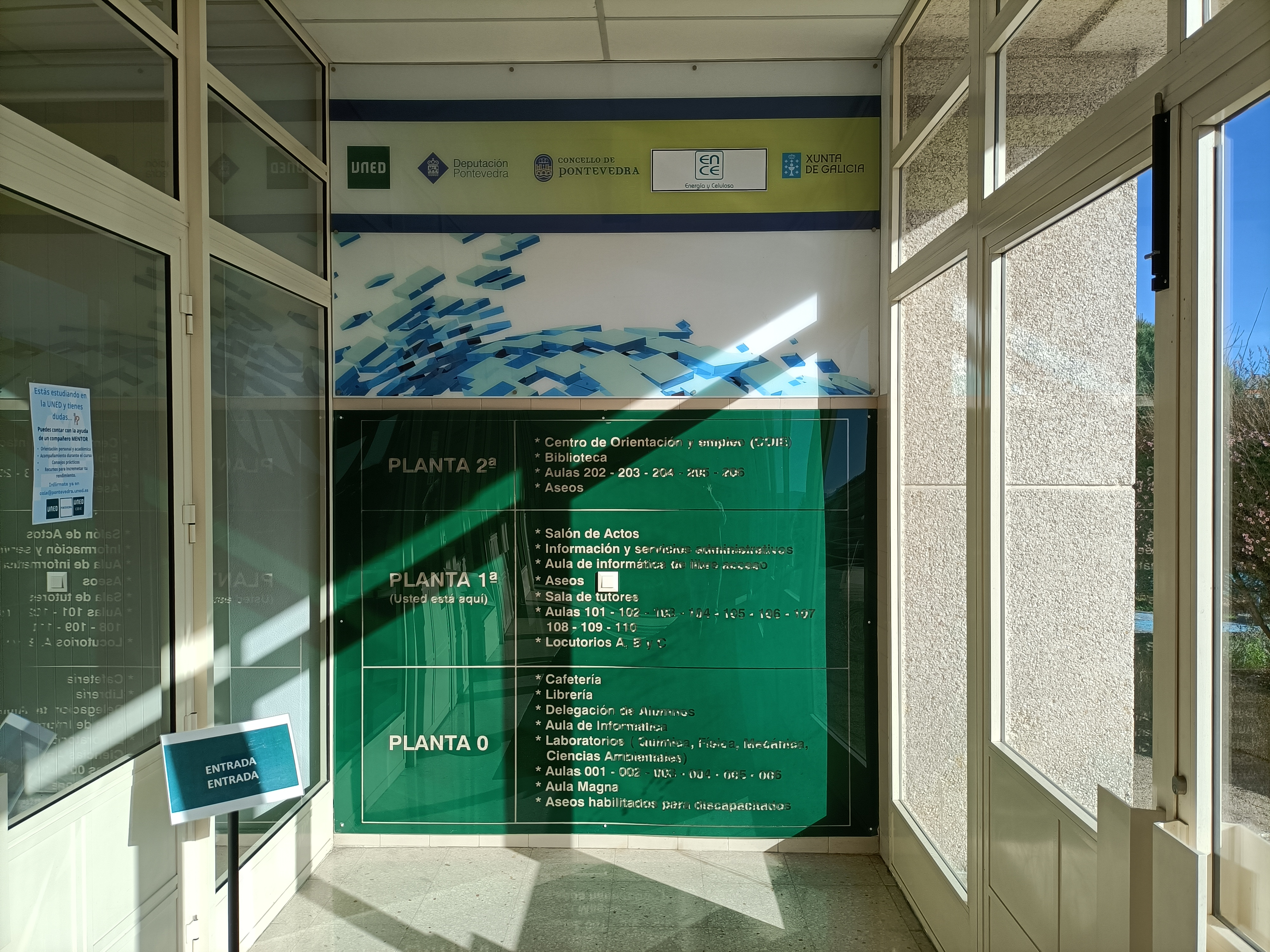
Directory at the entrance of the UNED

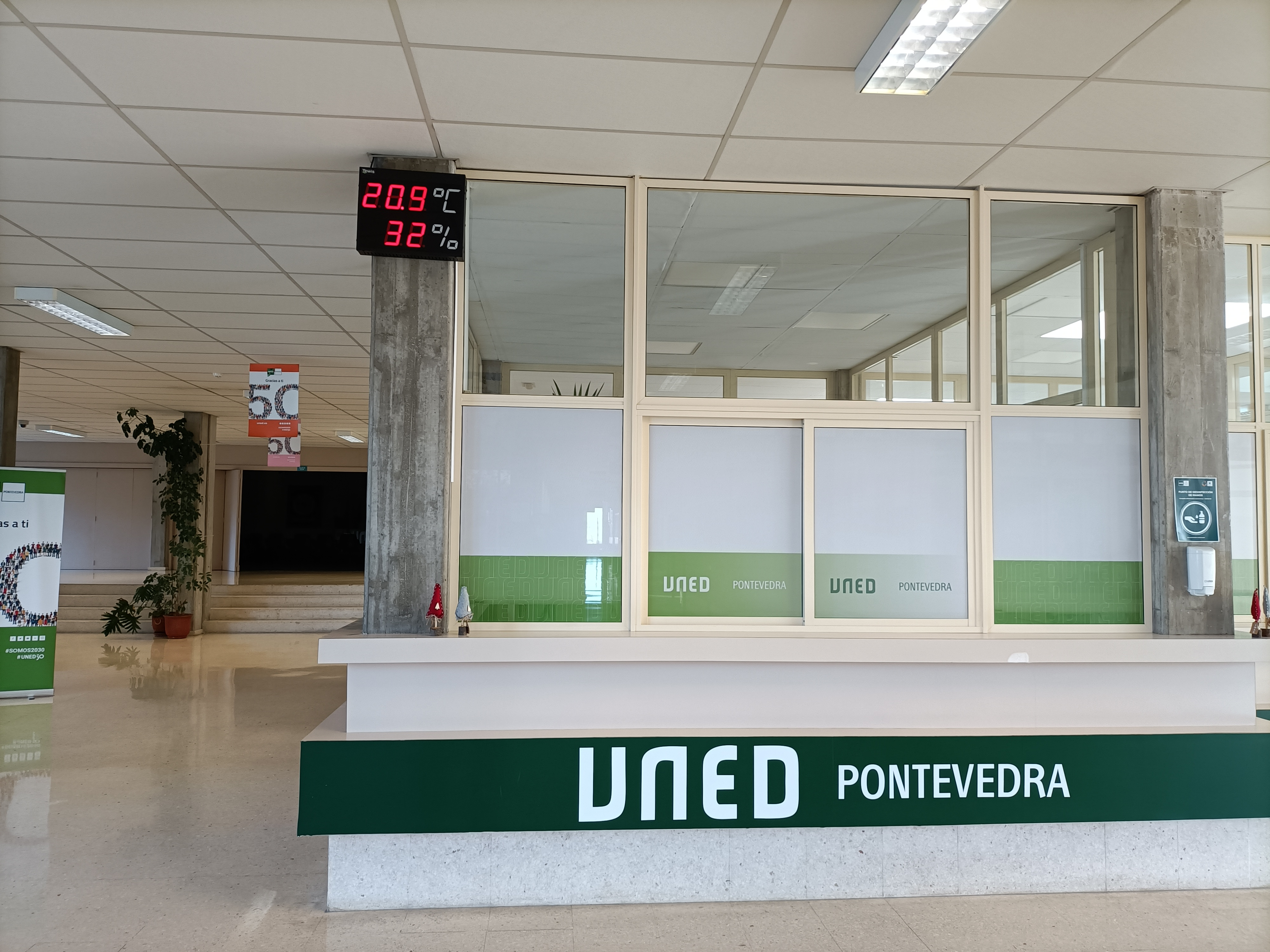
Hallway inside the UNED headquarters

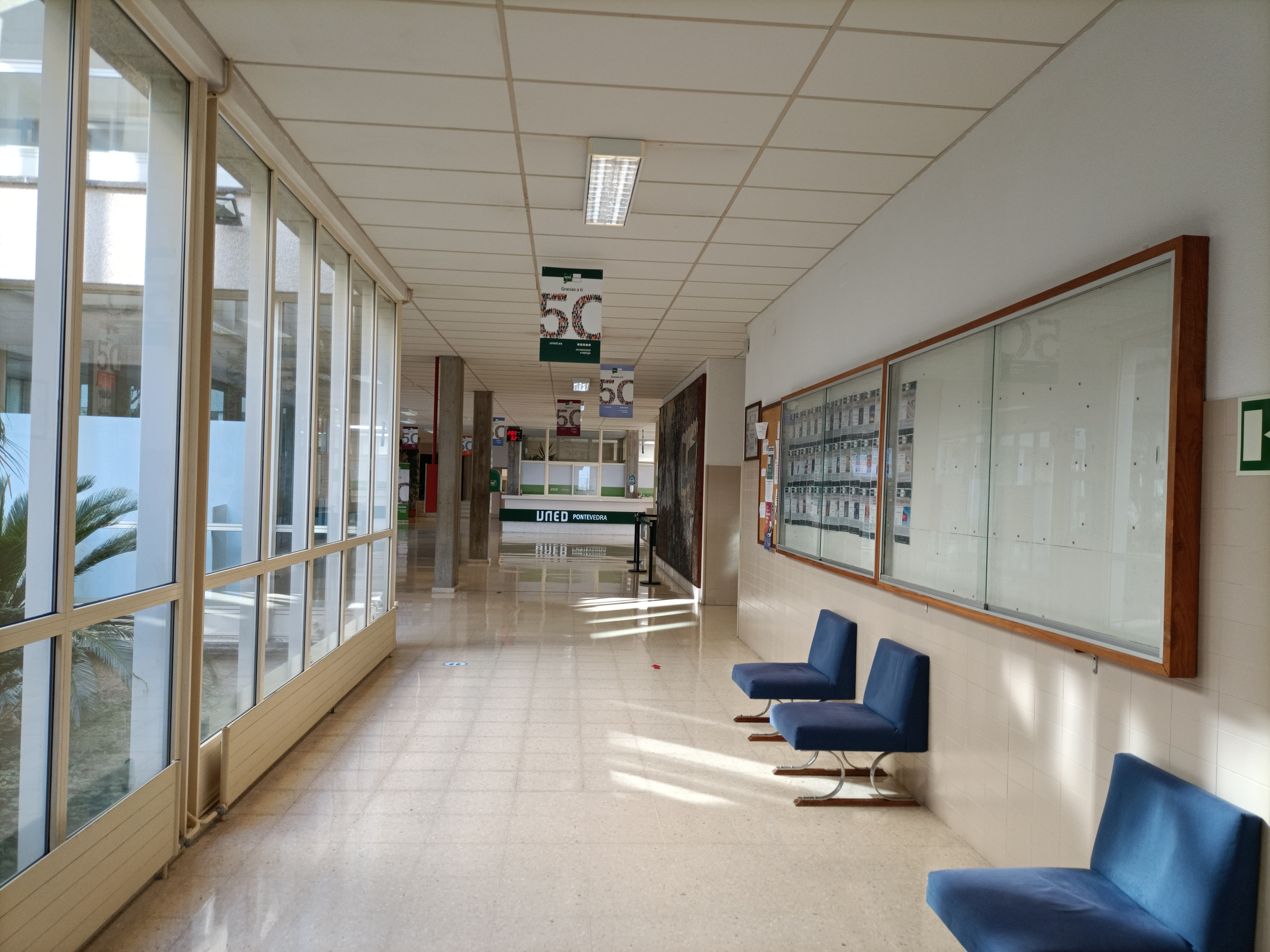
One of the corridors of the university centre

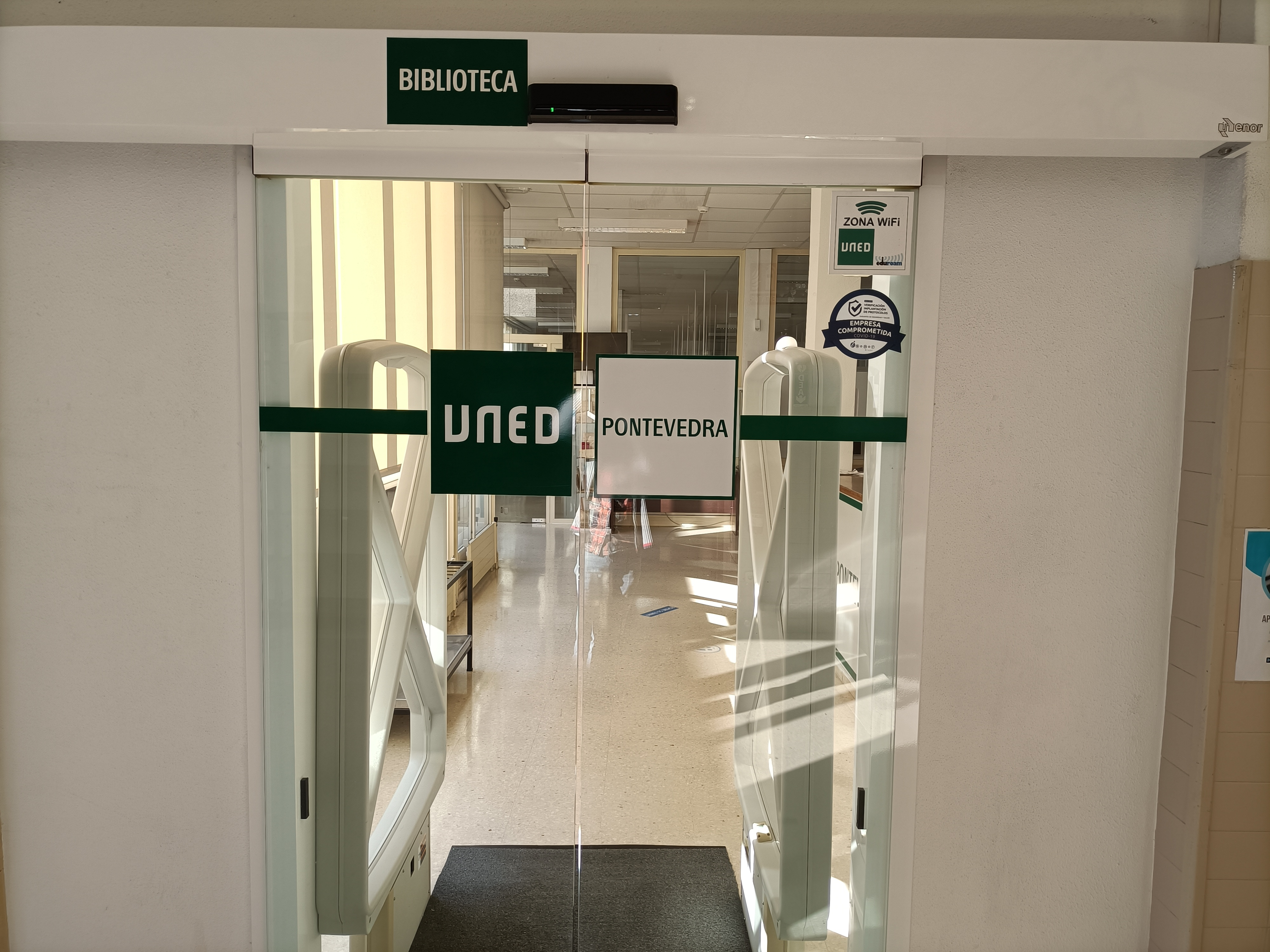
Entrance to the library of the centre

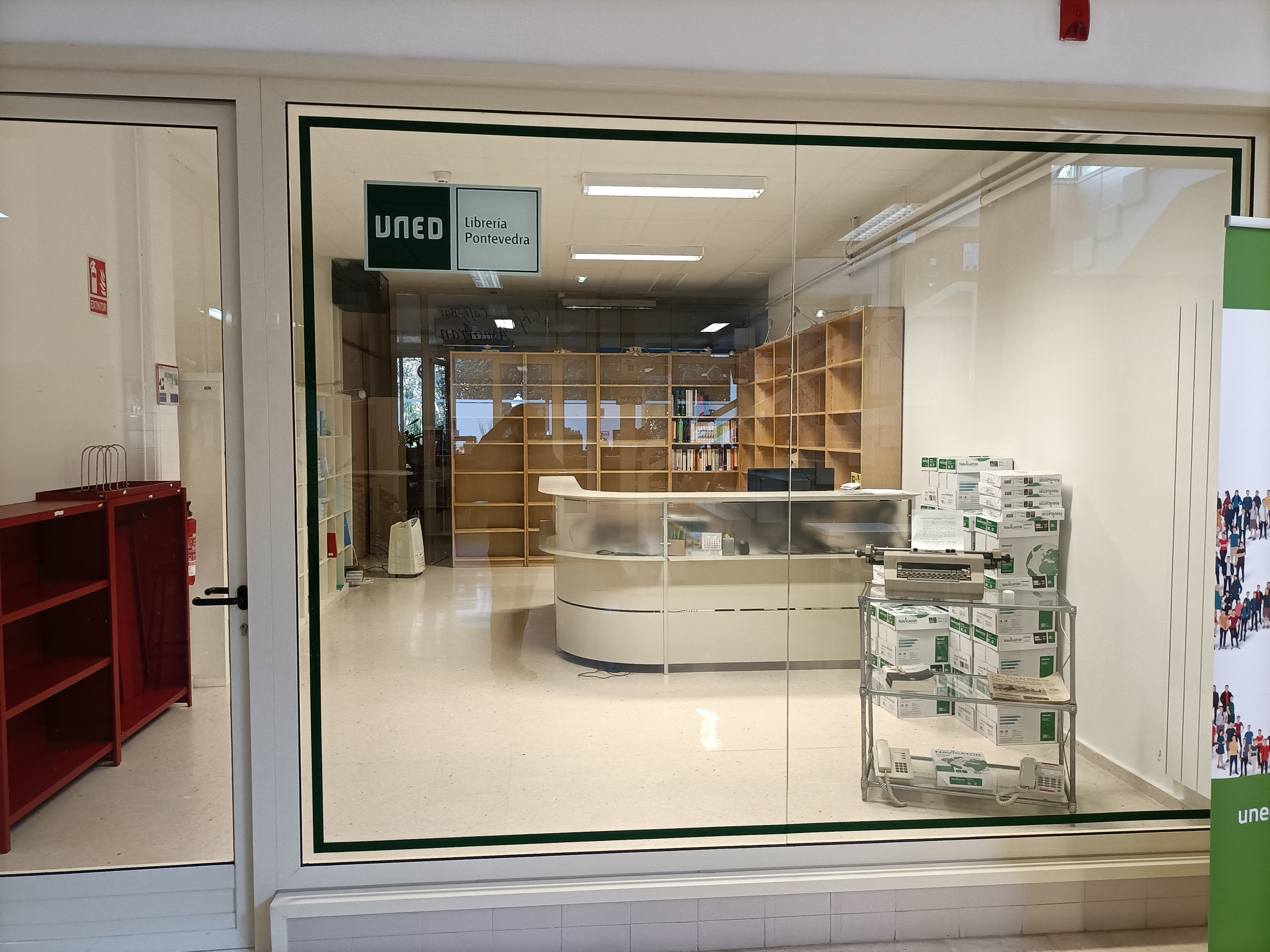
Bookshop of the UNED centre in Pontevedra

== See also ==
=== Related articles ===
- National University of Distance Education
- Monte Porreiro
- Pontevedra Campus
- Faculty of Fine Arts of Pontevedra

=== Bibliography ===
- Blanco Valdés, Juan Luis (2004). De cerca en la distancia, 1973-2003 : treinta años del Centro Asociado de la UNED de Pontevedra (in Spanish). Pontevedra: Centro Asociado de la UNED de Pontevedra. ISBN 978-84-6091-953-7.

=== External links ===
- UNED Pontevedra 45 años de historia
- 1972-2013 40 AÑOS UNED-De centros regionales a centros asociados p.28
