= Gustavo Fuertes =

Spanish film director

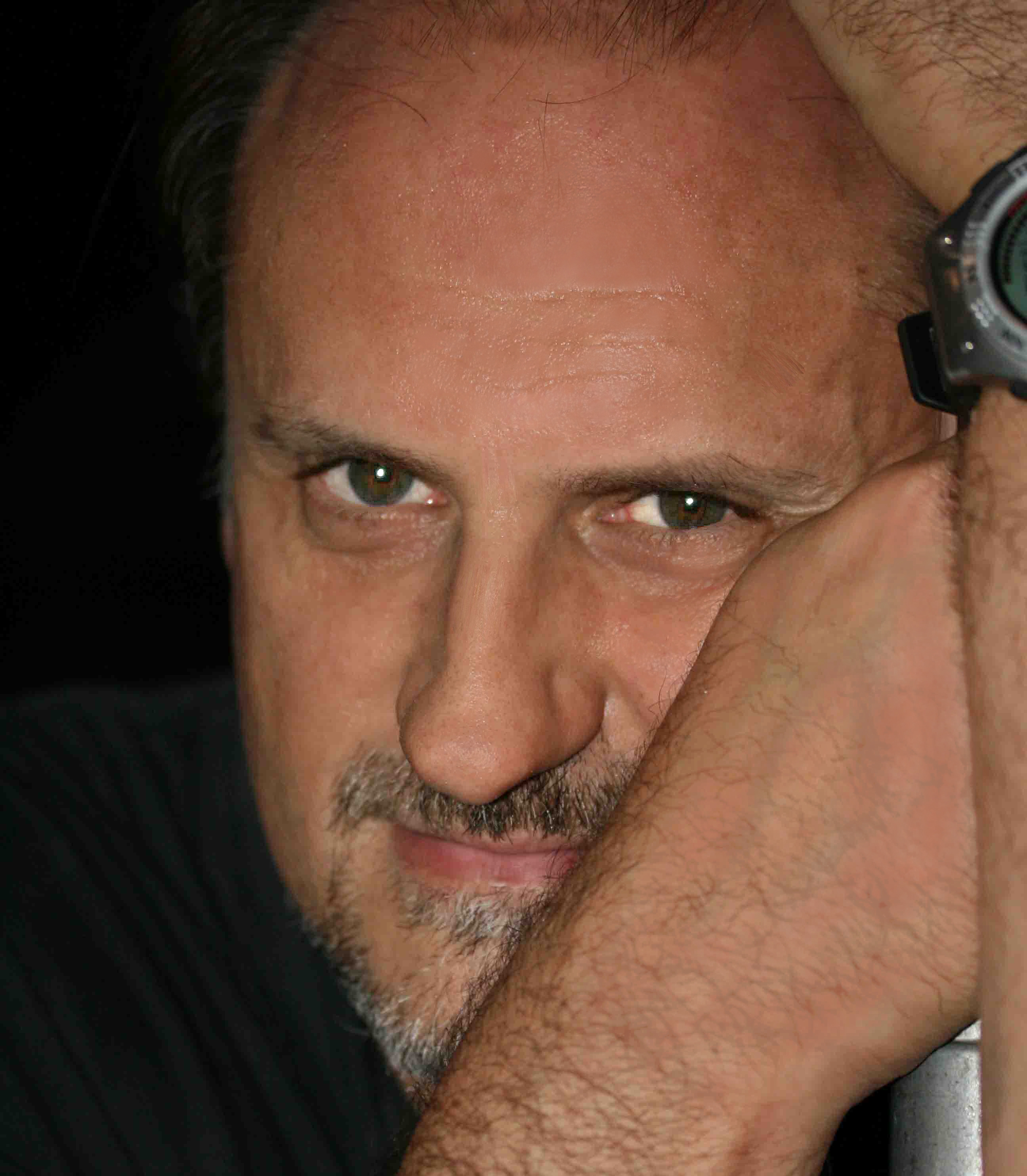
- Born: Gustavo Adolfo Fuertes Talavera; November 14, 1959 (age 66); Madrid, Spain
- Occupation: Director/Writer
- Years active: 1978–present

Gustavo Adolfo Fuertes Talavera is a screenwriter and director of Spanish cinema born November 14, 1959, on Madrid Spain. Among his main works it highlights the short film El Juicio Final (US Title: The Final Judgement(1992) which won a Silver Plaque in Chicago International Film Festival.

== Biography ==
In 1982, Fuertes concluded his studies at the Universidad Complutense de Madrid, being licensed in Audiovisual Communication. At the time that he obtained the diploma in the Centre of Image Studies. In 1984 he got a diploma of the Academy of Motion Picture Arts and Sciences for his short of animation presented in the Olympic Games of Los Angeles, [The Spirit of Olympus(1984)].

In 1991, he founded his own production company Legendland Films and the branch, High Contrast, a special, holding company of effects and animation, dedicated mainly to short films. In that same year he got a Silver Plaque Award at The International Chicago Film Festival for his shortfilm “The Final Judgement (1992).”

In 1996, he collaborated directly with Juan Carlos Fresnadillo for the realization of his multi awarded short film, Esposados (US Title: "Linked"), nominated for the Academy Award (Oscar) of the Academy of Motion Picture Arts and Sciences(AMPAS).

In 2000, he collaborated with Juan Carlos Fresnadillo again, to supervise the script of the film Intacto.

Gustavo Fuertes has worked as TV director for CEMAV at National University of Distance Education (UNED). He has been Screenwriting and Audiovisual Narrative teacher in the European University of Madrid, as well as in the CEV and in the Screenwriting Factory. He also taught courses of Screenwriter, Film Directing, Cinematographer, Camera…. He has worked for 30 years in all kind of cinema productions.

Gustavo Fuertes is currently based in Madrid, where he develops his feature film projects and helps young filmmakers to create theirs.

== Filmography ==
- Ngutu (2012) [Thanks]
- Thirteen accounts necklace (2012) [Director, Writer, Cinematographer]
- Blood Brothers (2012) [Cinematographer]
- Salvador Dalí (2011) [Cinematographer]
- My Fiancés (2008) [Director] Viral Commercial for Edreams
- The Sergio's Journey (2008) [Cinematographer uncredited][Make up Artist][Actor]
- Sand Walls (2008) [Cinematographer]
- Lenny the Wonder Dog (2004) [Digital Artist]
- Intacto (2001) [Writer uncredited] [Thanks]
- I Couldn't Care Less (2000) [Writer]
- The Open Suitcase (1999) [Title Designer] (as High Contrast)
- The Island of the hell (1998) [Head Titles And Credits]
- In the middle of nowhere (1997) [Title Designer] (as High Contrast)
- The Flavor of the can food (1997) [Animation]
- Trailer (1997) [Title Designer] (as High Contrast)
- Linked (Spanish Title Esposados) (1996) [Title Designer] [Special Effects: artificial head]
- Chewing gums (1996) [Visual Effects]
- Sunflower pipes (1994) [Title Designer]
- The Controls Aren't Responding (1993) [Animation Effects]
- The Final Judgement (1992) (Spanish Title El Juicio Final) [Writer] [Animatronics] [Editor][Producer] [Director]
- For the old times (1990) [Cinematographer: / second unit]
- Periodic pure (1984) [Cinematographer]
- The Spirit of Olympus (1984) [Cinematographer] [Writer] [Animation Camera Operator][Managing Of Photography: animation] [Editor] (animation) [Producer]
- Power Game (1983) [Sound Assistant]
- The Doll (1983) [Cinematographer]
- Those Winners of tomorrow (1981) [Sound Assistant]
- Nostalgia of silent comedy (1981) [Assistant Camera]
- Behind every day (1980) [Sound Assistant]
- Everebody Calls Me The Cat (1980) [Actor.... Policeman] (uncredited) [Assistant Director] [Stunt Driver] (uncredited)
- Sound stimuli (1979) [Cinematographer]
- Blindfolded eyes (1978) [Actor.... Extra] (uncredited)
