= Edith Checa Oviedo =

Spanish journalist, poet and writer (1957–2017)

Edith Checa
- Born: Edith Salud Checa Oviedo; December 24, 1957; Seville, Spain
- Died: December 23, 2017 (aged 60); Madrid, Spain
- Education: Complutense University of Madrid
- Occupations: Journalist, poet, writer, radio host

Edith Salud Checa Oviedo (Seville, Spain, November 24, 1957 – December 29, 2017) was a Spanish journalist, writer, poet, and radio host.

== Biography ==
Checa had a degree in Information Science, and a Diploma of Advanced Studies in Literature and Media from the Complutense University of Madrid.

In addition to her published poems and novels, Checa had over twenty years of experience as a radio host and radio drama director. She was the director and announcer of the following radio programs with the National University of Distance Education (UNED) from 1989 to 2005, broadcast on Radio 3 of RNE: Rincón literario: tus poemas por las ondas and Informativo Universitario. Following that, Checa was a presenter and writer of the following UNED educational television programs on La 2 on TVE and on TVE Internacional: Literary Rincón and Yesterday and Today in Poetry.

Checa was also an instructor of creative writing, scriptwriting, and communication courses. She collaborated on the screenwriting for the program Al filo de lo impossible.

Her final job was teaching Literary Creation workshops for the Centro Andaluz de las Letras of the Junta de Andalucía. She was also the head of production for the audio guide content for museums and monuments. Checa's latest published book is the young adult novel La laguna del olvido, published December 2017.

Checa died on December 23, 2017, at 60 years old, in Madrid, Spain.

== Works ==
=== Novels ===
- El color del albero, Madrid: Editorial Nostrum (2000). ISBN 84-930249-6-1.
- No me pidas silencio, Madrid: Ediciones Vitruvio (2004). ISBN 84-89795-97-5. Finalist in the Felipe Trigo Awards, finalist in the Relatos de Mujer Awards of the Bilbao City Council, and shortlisted for the Herralde de novela Award.
- La luna nos abandona, Sevilla: Editorial Hilos de emociones (2016). ISBN 978-84-945219-4-2
- Las santas no se suicidan; Ocaña: Editorial Lastura (2016). ISBN 978-84-946036-6-2
- El objeto habitado, Ocaña: Editorial Lastura (2017). ISBN 978-84-946540-7-7

=== Children's stories ===
- Los misterios de la casa de mi abuela, Sevilla: Jirones de Azul (2006). ISBN 84-935059-4-3.
- Ya voy ya voy es libre
- La laguna del olvido (Lastura ediciones, Ocaña, 2017)

=== Poetry ===
- Un mar que pierde esperanza, Sevilla: Jirones de Azul, (2007). ISBN 84-96790-04-5.
- Corazones de ancla sin destino Editorial Torremozas.
- En el lecho de los presagios (Lastura ediciones, Ocaña, 2017)

=== Awards and nominations ===
- 2017 Premios "Dámaso Alonso" of the Hispanic Academy of Fine Letters
- Finalist for the València Negra Novel Award 2014
- Finalist for the Poetry Prize "José Zorrilla" 2013
- 2nd place “Hermanos Caba” Narrative Prize 2008 for La luna nos abandona
- “New Voices” Torremozas Poetry Prize 2003
- Finalist for the Vargas Llosa Prize 2005 for her novel Retazos de memorias
- Finalist for the 2005 Clarín Short Story Prize for La noche en la ventana
- Finalist for the Felipe Trigo Novel Prize 2001 for No me pidas silencio
- Finalist of the Bilbao City Council Women's Stories Award 2001 for No me pidas silencio
- Shortlisted for the 2001 Herralde Novel Prize for No me pidas silencio

=== Works in anthologies ===
Some of Checa's poems were published in the following anthologies:

- VARIOUS AUTHORS (2003), Voces nuevas: (XVI selección de poetisas), Madrid: Ediciones Torremozas. ISBN 84-7839-296-3.
- RUBIO, TEODORO (2003), De sombra y sueño, Editorial Celya. ISBN 84-95700-24-7.
- CHECA, EDITH, et al. (2004), El cerro de los versos, Barcelona. Ediciones Atenas. ISBN 84-933740-5-9

=== Others ===
- Through UNED, Checa directed a documentary on the life and work of Gertrudis Gómez de Avellaneda
