= Higher Technical School of Computer Engineering at UNED =

Educational institute in Madrid, Spain

Higher Technical School of Computer Engineering UNED
- Universidad Nacional de Educación a Distancia
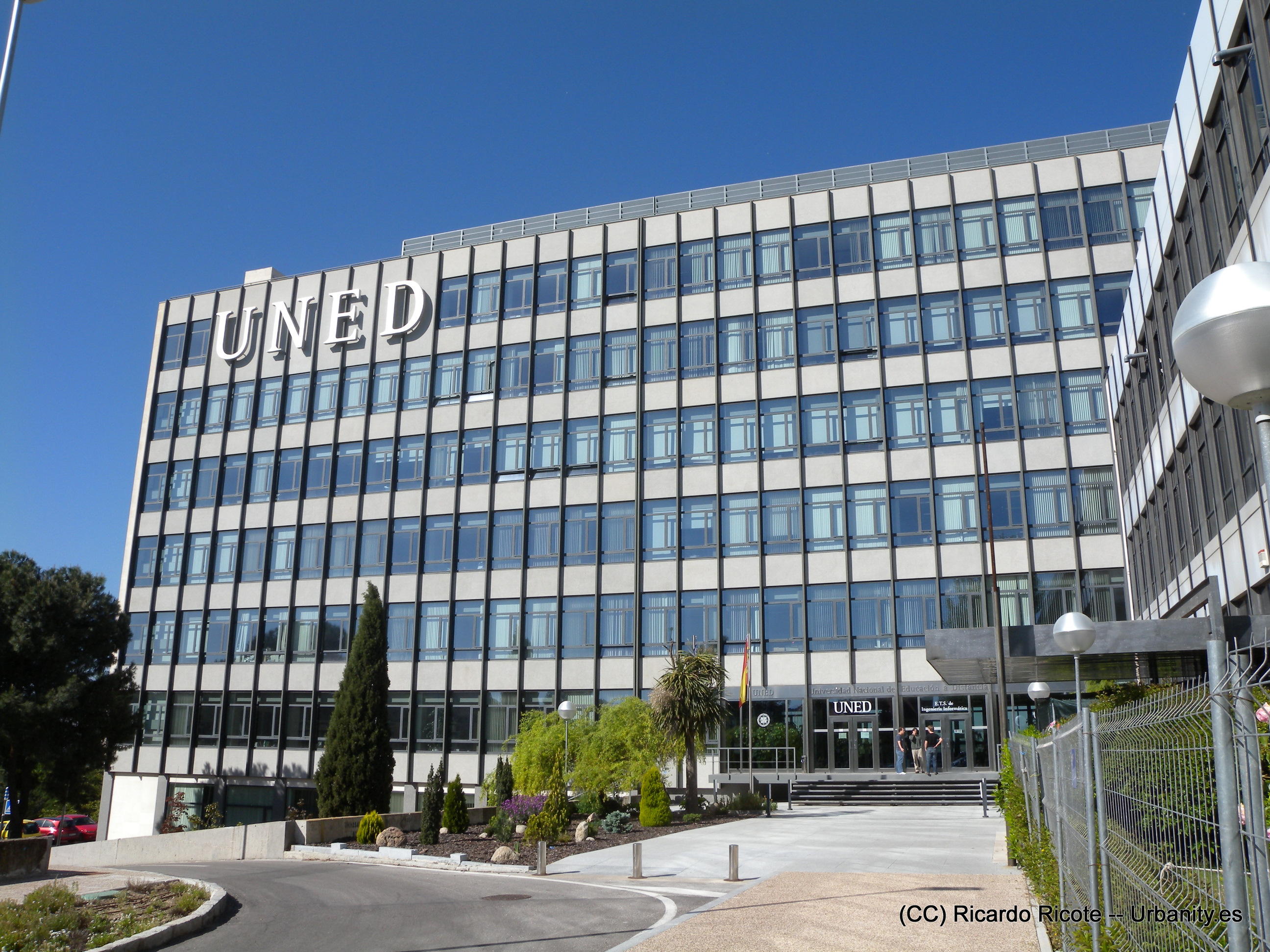
- Other names: E.T.S.I.I.
- Motto: «Omnibus mobilibus mobilior sapientia»
- Established: 1991
- Academic affiliations: National University of Distance Education
- Dean: Rafael Pastor Vargas
- Location: Madrid; 40°27′03″N 3°44′17″W

The Higher School of Computer Engineering at UNED (Spanish: Universidad Nacional de Educación a Distancia, National University of Distance Education) is an institute of higher education in Spain, with an extensive network of collaborating institutions, that teaches and issues degrees in Computer Science Engineering, Computer Engineering, IT Engineering and Artificial Intelligence Engineering (AI), as well as masters and PhDs.

== History ==
The Higher School of Computer Engineering at UNED was established in 1991. Its creation was the response to a growing demand for computer science professionals with different degrees not only focused in computing but also in industry, business and research. In 2001 the school expanded its academic offering to include master's degrees. In 2010–2011 the academic content was adapted to the requirements of the European Higher Education Program, replacing the former degrees. In the 2026-2027 academic year, The Higher School of Computer Engineering at UNED will expand its academic offering with a new Degree in Artificial Intelligence (AI) Engineering.

Academic offerings currently include the following:

- Computer Science Engineering (five academic courses)
- Degree in Artificial Intelligence Engineering (AI) (four academic courses)
- Degree in Computer Engineering (four academic courses)
- Degree in Information and Communication Technologies Engineering – IT Engineering (four academic courses)

== School departments ==
- Computer Science and Languages
- Artificial Intelligence
- Automatics and Computer Science
- Software Engineering and Computer Systems
- Communication Systems and Control

== Inter-faculty departments ==
- Business Management
- Business Economics and Accounting
- Material Physics
- Statistic, Operative Investigation and Calculus
- Fundamentals Mathematics
- Applied Mathematics I
- Mechanic
- Electric, Electronics and Control Engineering
- Manufacturing Engineering

== Research groups ==
- Computer Systems and Language Department

Natural Language Processing (NLP Group)
Interactive Environments for Teaching-Learning (LTCS Group)

- Artificial Intelligence Department

Research Center for Decision-making Intelligence Systems (CISIAD)
aDeNu
SIEA
Intelligence Systems: Modelling, Development and Applications (SIMDA)

- Computer Systems and Automatic Department

Modelling, simulation and process control
Industrial computing

- Software Engineering and Computer Systems Department

Software Quality
Computer Graphics and Virtual Reality
Software Engineering
Robotics and Artificial Intelligence
RFID Middleware

- Communication and Control Systems Department

Parameter space, multi-frequency and fractional techniques for system control
