= Valencia Negra =

Annual literary festival in Valencia, Spain

The Festival de Género Negro de Valencia, known as Valencia Negra or VLC Negra, is an annual literary festival in Valencia, Spain. It is one of several festivals in the first week of May, which are known as "Semana Negra," or "black weeks," due to their celebration of thematically "dark" genres like crime fiction and detective stories.

This festival was founded in 2013 by Valencian writers Jordi Llobregat, Marina López Martínez (Marina Lomar), Santiago Álvarez, and Bernardo Carrión.

The festival was initially conceived as an event open to all and hosts a wide range of activities and competitions, including award shows, artist meetings, musical performances, and film viewings. Since its inception, Valencia Negra has gone international by agreeing to collaborate with the French festival Toulouse Polard du Sud.

== Awards ==
Several literary award competitions are held during the festival.

- Francisco Gonzalez Ledesma Literary Career Award – VLC Negra
- Best VLC Negra Novel (Three Award categories: Millor novel la, Mejor Novela, and Best Novel)
- #60en Negro – Certamen de MiniClips
- #140tirs. Microrelatos Competition

== Participants (selected) ==
Over the years there has been a wide range of participants in the festival.

- Pierre Lemaitre
- Philip Kerr
- Joel Dicker
- Alicia Gimenez Bartlett
- Petros Markaris
- Yasmina Khadra
- Dolores Redondo
- Lorenzo Silva
- Victor del Árbol
- Alexis Ravello
- Juan Madrid
- Jerome Tristant
- Graziella Moreno
- Andrew Martin
- Enrique Urbizu
- Rodrigo Cortes
- Rosa Montero
- Carlos Salem
- Rosa Ribas
- Edith Checa
- Marcelo Lujan
- Carlos Zanón
- Sandrone Dazieri
- David Llorente
- Agustín Díaz Yanes

== See also ==
- Semana Negra
