= Lucas Platero =

Spanish sociologist

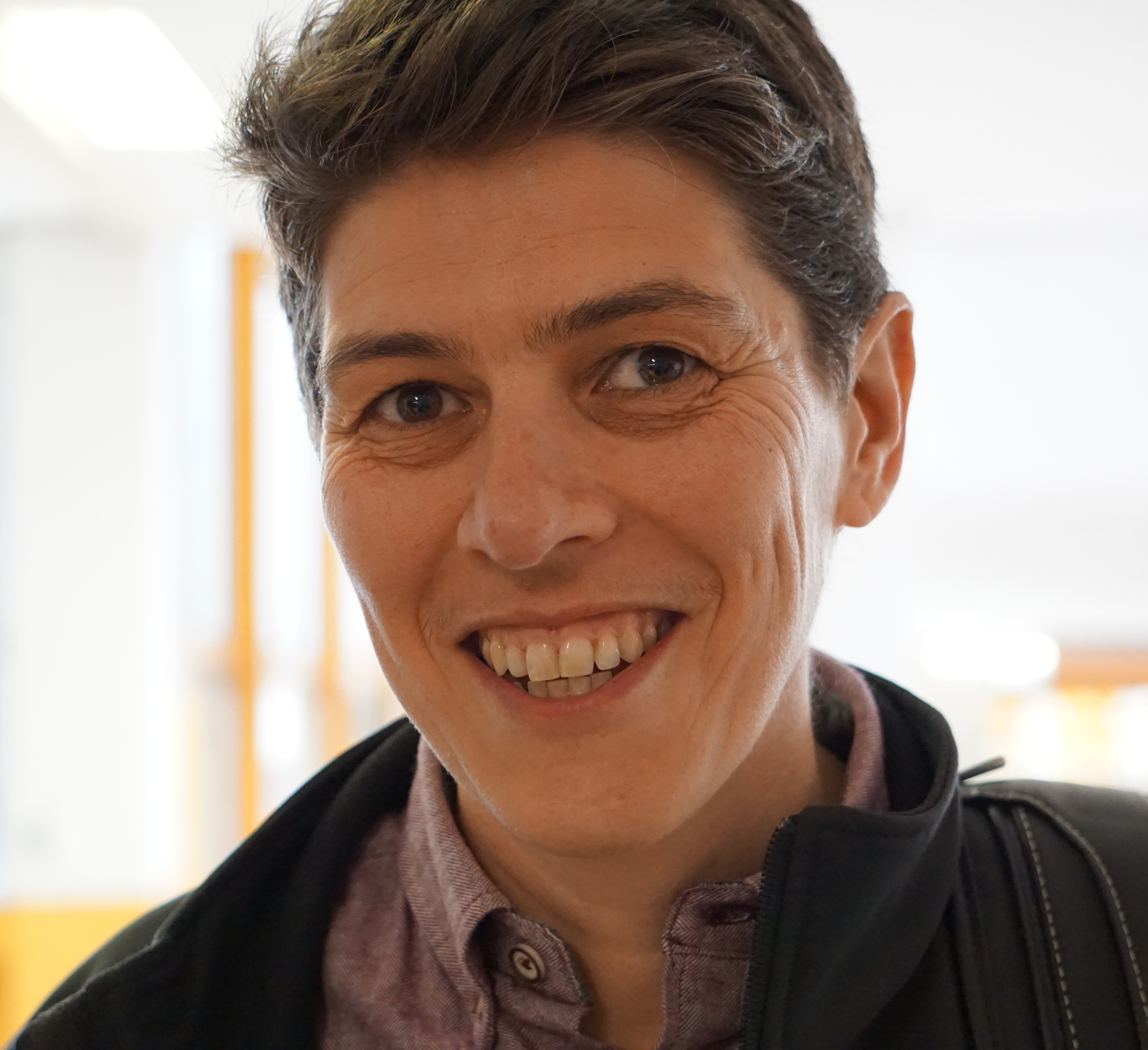
- Lucas Platero at the Autonomous University of Madrid
- Born: 1970; Madrid (Spain)
- Education: Complutense University of Madrid (Bachelor's Degree in Psychology); National University of Distance Education (PhD. in Sociology)
- Occupation(s): Sociologist, teacher, researcher, and LGBT activist
- Employer: Rey Juan Carlos University (2013-2014)

Lucas Platero Méndez (born; 1970) is a Spanish educator and researcher, recognized for his activism in the fight for LGBT rights.

== Career ==
Platero holds a Ph.D. in Sociology and Political Science from the National University of Distance Education (UNED), a degree in Psychology from the Complutense University of Madrid (UCM), and is a teacher in community social intervention and a researcher. He also directs the University General Series of Bellaterra Publishing.

During his student years, he was an activist in several feminist and lesbian organizations, being a founding member of RQTR (Erre que te erre), the first university LGBT association in the Spanish State, established at the Complutense University of Madrid in 1994. His activism evolved into an academic-based form of activism. His research areas include non-normative sexuality, intersectionality of various forms of exclusion, and transformative pedagogy.

He has two main publication lines: on one hand, publications for a specialized academic audience through research journals, focusing especially on transsexuality and gender relations in the Spanish context, as well as the intersectional relationship between disability, gender, and sexuality, and public policies; and on the other, several publications aimed at the general public with a more accessible focus.

== Recognitions ==
In 2006, Platero received the first María Ángeles Durán Scientific Innovation Award for the Study of Women and Gender from the Complutense University of Madrid, alongside María Bustelo, Emanuela Lombardo, Silvia López, and Elin Paterson, for the work Gender Equality Policies in Spain and Europe: An Analysis of Interpretive Frameworks. The following year, the Provincial Council of Huelva awarded him second place in the Gender Equality Research Prize for the article Gender and sexual orientation: intersecting inequalities in national and regional policies? An analysis of problem representation in the Spanish gender equality political agenda (1995-2005).

In 2020, he received the Emma Goldman Prize from the Flax Foundation for his scientific and outreach career. He also received one of the 2020 Plumas Awards from the State Federation of Lesbians, Gays, Trans and Bisexuals (FELGTB) in recognition of his trans activism and his role as a reference figure in queer and intersectional politics.

== Works ==
- 2007 – Herramientas para combatir el bullying homofóbico. Talasa Ediciones. ISBN 978-84-96266-23-0.
- 2008 – Lesbianas. Discursos y representaciones. Melusina. ISBN 84-96614-38-7.
- 2012 – Intersecciones. Cuerpos y sexualidades en la encrucijada. Edicions Bellaterra. ISBN 978-84-7290-603-7.
- 2014 – Trans*exualidades. Acompañamientos, factores de salud y recursos educativos. En colaboración con la ilustradora Isa Vázquez. Edicions Bellaterra. ISBN 978 84 7290 688 4.
- 2015 – Por un chato de vino. Historias de travestismo y masculinidad femenina. Edicions Bellaterra. ISBN 978-84-7290-716-4
- 2017 – Barbarismos queer y otras esdrújulas. Edicions Bellaterra. ISBN 978-84-7290-829-1.
- 2017 – Investigación sociológica sobre las personas transexuales y sus experiencias familiares. Ayto. Madrid. ISBN 978-84-617-8588-9
- 2019 – Cuerpos Marcados. Vidas que cuentan y políticas públicas. Ediciones Bellaterra. ISBN 978-84-7290-939-7
- 2020 – (h)amor6 trans. Ediciones Continta Me Tienes. ISBN 978-84-122760-2-2.
