= Derek Ernest Blackman =

British psychologist

- Born: Derek Ernest Blackman
- Education: University of Exeter; Queen's University of Belfast
- Scientific career
- Fields: Experimental psychology
- Workplaces: University of Cardiff
- Thesis: Some determinants of conditioned suppression in the rat (1966)

Derek Ernest Blackman is a British psychologist whose research was concerned with the experimental analysis of learned behaviour.

== Career ==
Blackman obtained his BSc from the University of Exeter in 1966 followed by a PhD from Queen's University of Belfast in 1968. He was appointed to the Department of Psychology in the faculty of Science at the University of Birmingham before being appointed to the faculty at the University of Cardiff where he remained for the whole of his later academic career. He served as Head of Department and Dean in the Faculty of Science. He retired in 1998 as Emeritus Professor of Psychology.

He was active in the British Psychological Society of which he became president in 1981. After his retirement, he was active in international education including involvement in the International Baccalaureate and in the United World Colleges.

== Research ==
His research was concerned with the experimental analysis of learned behaviour. He authored a large number of journal articles, chapters and books.

== Books ==
- Blackman, D.E. (1997). Operant Conditioning: An Experimental Analysis of Behaviour.
- Sanger, D., & Blackman, D.E. (Eds) (2016) Aspects of Psychopharmacology.

== Awards ==
- Fellow, British Psychological Society
- 1997: Hon DSc, National University of Distance Education, Spain

== Positions ==
- 1981: President, British Psychological Society
- 1998-1999: Director General, International Baccalaureate
- 2004-2012: Vice-chair, International Board, United World Colleges
