= Ramiro Villapadierna =

Spanish journalist

Ramiro Villapadierna (Madrid, Spain, 1964) is a culture manager, journalist and polyglot, and is currently the Head of the Jerez European Capital of Culture project. He's been previously the executive director of the Oficina del Español at the Madrid Government, a soft-diplomacy office in charge Spanish culture, academics and heritage.

He is also a Director of the Chair Vargas Llosa (Cátedra Vargas Llosa), which showcases and world-wide promotes the cultural and political legacy of the Spanish Literature Nobel Prize winner of Peruvian origin.

He has been an executive director of the Instituto Cervantes, the global pan-Hispanic institution dedicated to culture diplomacy. For the Institute he has headed its Frankfurt and Prague branches, and has presided over their EUNIC, the European Network of Institutes of Culture, local clusters.

He has been a long time reporter and analyst on European affairs and Hispanic culture, and was a War Correspondent during the Balkan conflicts and the Arab Spring.

Previously he was a Berlin, Vienna and Prague based writer and commentator, on Central Europe transitions to democracy and contemporary culture, with several international media and political institutes. As a known flying correspondent, he has been rewarded at the Salvador de Madariaga European Journalism Prize, at the Cirilo Rodrigo Foreign Correspondence Award and the Larra Prize.

He has contributed to several international media, including the DPA, after a long spell as a Central Europe Bureau Head for the Spanish national daily ABC. For it he was posted to Prague, Vienna, the Balkans and Berlin and travelled over two decades the Central and Eastern regions.

== Overview ==
He's got a University Degree in Journalism at Universidad Complutense, a master's degree in Historic and Customary Law at UNED, has attended courses on public services, team managing and leading, at INAP and is proficient in several European languages, including Spanish, French, English, German, Italian, Serbo-Croatian and Czech.

He's continuously reported on the political and economic transition in Centre and East Europe, including the historical developments of the reunification of Europe, the splitting of Czechoslovakia and the collapse of Yugoslavia with its unfolding Balkan wars (where he was wounded, kidnapped and arrested). Exceptionally he wrote a series on the American society at the end of Bill Clinton era.

In 1990, at the collapse of communist regimes and the beginning of democratic transition, he was assigned to open the Eastern Europe ABC office. Based in Prague, Vienna and Berlin, as eventually posted all over the Balkans, he's been amongst the few long-standing European reporters continuously travelling the eastern regions and interviewing chiefs of Government and intellectuals alike.

Formerly he was a culture reporter with ABC as well as other outlets, where he has written also on literature and cinema.

== Moreover ==
Articles published by media in Spain, Germany, the Czech Republic, Serbia, Croatia, Bulgaria and Poland and travel writings and country reports published in magazines and Encyclopediae.

Requested correspondences and contributions for the BBC, CNN, Deutsche Welle, Radio France International, El País, El Mundo, Radio Nederland, Radio Nacional de España, Cuatro, Tele5, A3, Cadena SER, Radio Montreal etc.

Lectures on Europe and the Balkans at the end of Communism, Nationalism, War reporting and conflict resolution, at events and meetings with the European Commission, Wilton Park, FRIDE, Konrad Adenauer Foundation, Universidad Complutense, Instituto Cervantes, the Centre for Eastern Studies in Warsaw, Economic Forum in Krynica, The Universidad Internacional Menéndez Pelayo, The Forum Formentor, Universidad de Alicante, Venice Fondazione Giorgio Cini, International Balkan Correspondents Congress, Prague NATO Atlantic Club, Fundación CIDOB, Academia de la Guardia Civil, Escuela de Guerra or Fundación Duques de Soria. Regular commenting guest to TV specials on Europe integration, democratization and nation building.

At Diván Este-Oeste he's kept one of the few Spanish language blogs on old Mitteleuropa and non-typical stories from Germany, Austria, Poland, the Czech Republic, Slovakia, Hungary, Romania, Bulgaria, Slovenia, Serbia, Croatia, Bosnia and Herzegovina, Montenegro, Macedonia, Kosovo and Albania.

He's taken part on several books and projects on nationalism, Central Europe, and Journalism in conflict areas.
