= The Final Judgement =

The Final Judgment
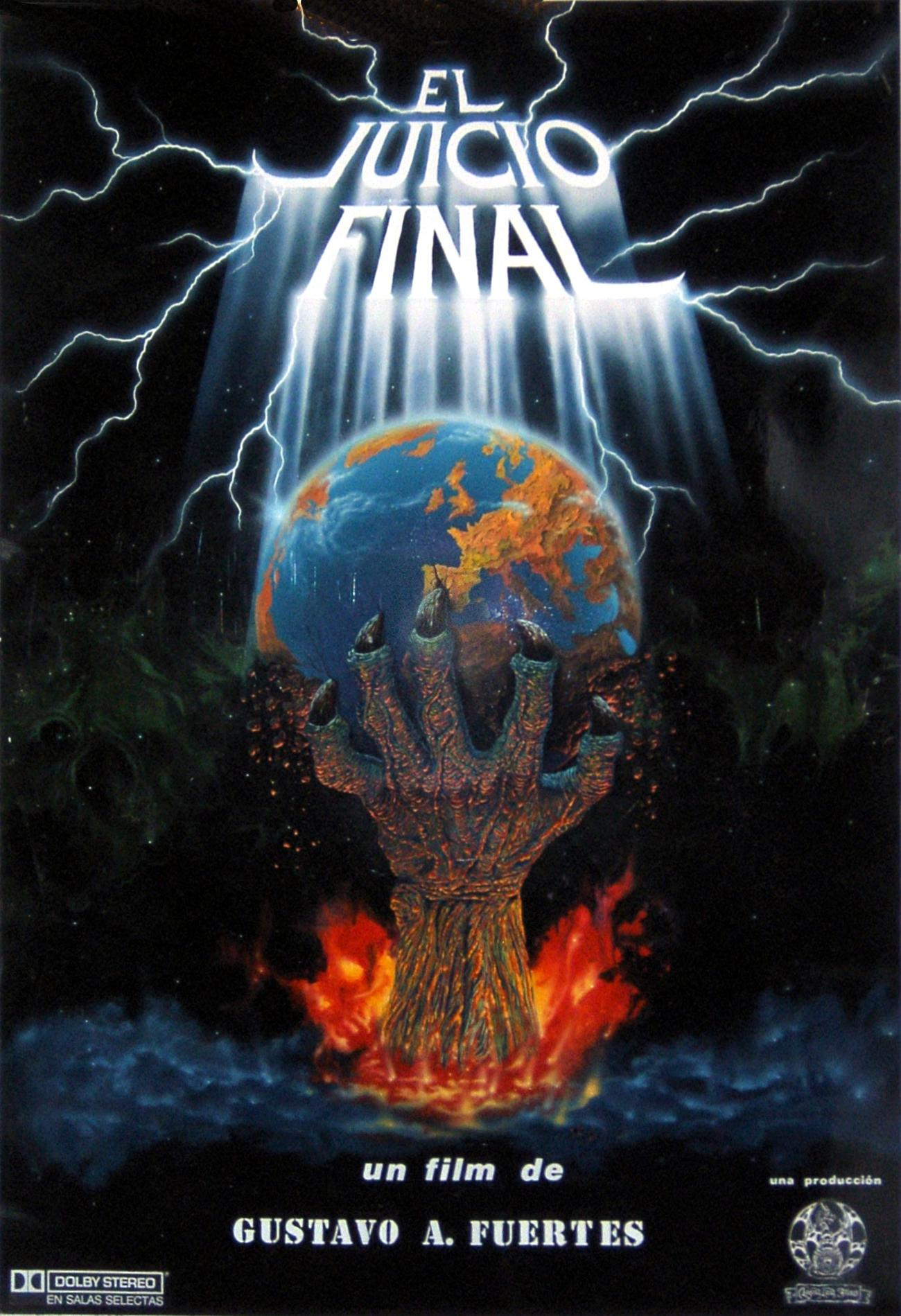
- Directed by: Gustavo Fuertes
- Written by: Gustavo Fuertes
- Produced by: Gustavo Fuertes; Esperanza de Provens
- Starring: Ángel Relló (Man - Pilot); Andrea Guardiola (God); Manuel Pereiro (Father Time); Irene Guerrero de Luna (The Grim Reaper Voice)
- Cinematography: Ángel Villarías
- Edited by: Gustavo Fuertes
- Music by: Hugo Westerdahl
- Production company: LegendLand Films
- Release date: 1992
- Running time: 23 minutes
- Country: Spain
- Language: Spanish

The Final Judgment (1992), original title El juicio final (1992), is a Spanish short film, written, directed and produced by Gustavo Fuertes. Fuertes also took control of special effects, make-up and editing.

The Final Judgment was the first short film in Dolby Stereo to be shot in Spain. It was exhibited by Half World, and obtained a Silver Plaque in the Chicago International Film Festival.

== Plot ==
Laced with black humor, and a theatrical parody, The Final Judgment recounts the story of a pilot, Man (Ángel Relló), who is the only survivor of a supposed World War. The film looks at how Man will cope when he has to face God (Andrea Guardiola), Death and Father Time (Manuel Pereiro), in what will be his Final Judgment.

== Influences ==
The film is claimed to be the first to depict the character of God using an actress.

The film utilised many ironic references to the first Gulf War, which had just finished when the film was made.
