= José de Villapadierna =

Spanish nobleman and racing driver (1809–79)

José María de Villapadierna
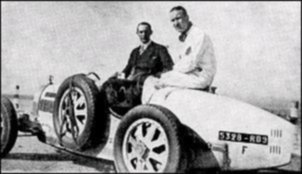
- With his Bugatti T35 in 1930
- Born: José María Padierna de Villapadierna y Avecilla; 27 November 1909 Malaga, Spain
- Died: 23 October 1979 (aged 69) Madrid

José María Padierna de Villapadierna y Avecilla, Conde de Villapadierna, who raced under the name José de Villapadierna (27 November 1909 – 23 October 1978) was a Spanish nobleman and Grand Prix racing driver.

== Early life ==
De Villapadierna the son of Felipe Padierna de Villapadierna y Erice, 2nd Count of Villapadierna, and of Raimunda Avecilla Aguado; on his father's death in 1928, he inherited the entire family fortune, including land around Madrid and the Palace of Linares, as well a site which would become the training ground of Real Madrid.

== Motor racing career ==
In 1930, de Villapadierna sold some of his grandmother's jewellery to buy a Bugatti Type 35, although he never actually raced it. In 1934 he bought a pair of Maserati 8CMs and an Alfa Romeo P3 along with racer Joaquín Palacio, to form Vipal Racing. The team debuted at the 1934 Penya Rhin Grand Prix, although Maserati had only delivered one of the cars (painted in Spanish racing yellow), which Palacio drove; de Villapadierna was loaned a red works car which he took to 7th place.

The team's drivers included Raymond Sommer and Mlle Hellé Nice (with whom de Villapadierna had a brief relationship), and de Villapadierna himself concentrated on voiturette races. He only drove in one Grand Prix, the 1935 Monaco Grand Prix, for which he used his 8CM. He started last and stalled on the grid for half-a-minute, but ran 8th out of 10 remaining runners at three-fifths distance, when he misjudged his braking at the chicane and crashed out into the sandbags.

De Villapadierna was finishing 3rd at the 1936 Deauville Grand Prix when the Spanish Civil War overtook his family - his sister and uncles were shot by revolutionaries, and de Villapadierna hiself escaped to San Sebastian.

== Post-racing ==
During the Civil War, he joined with General Francisco Franco's forces and was wounded in Extremadura.

He remained close to the motor racing world, working as Clerk of the Course at the Spanish Grand Prix in the 1960s and 1970s; he also renewed an old interest in horse racing, his horse Rheffisimo being the first Spanish stallion to take part in the King George VI and Queen Elizabeth Stakes at Ascot.

== Personal life ==
De Villapadierna was well-connected - he was a close friend of matadors like Manolete, Juan Belmonte, and Antonio Bienvenida, and actresses like Rita Hayworth and Ava Gardner; his lifestyle was so profligate that he reportedly burned through three inheritances.

He married Alicia Klein y García de Aráoz in 1959; the couple had two children, their son José Felipe becoming the fourth Count de Villapadierna, and operated a golf course on the Costa del Sol. De Villapadierna died of cancer in 1979.
