= Ramon Sainero =

Spanish Celtic scholar

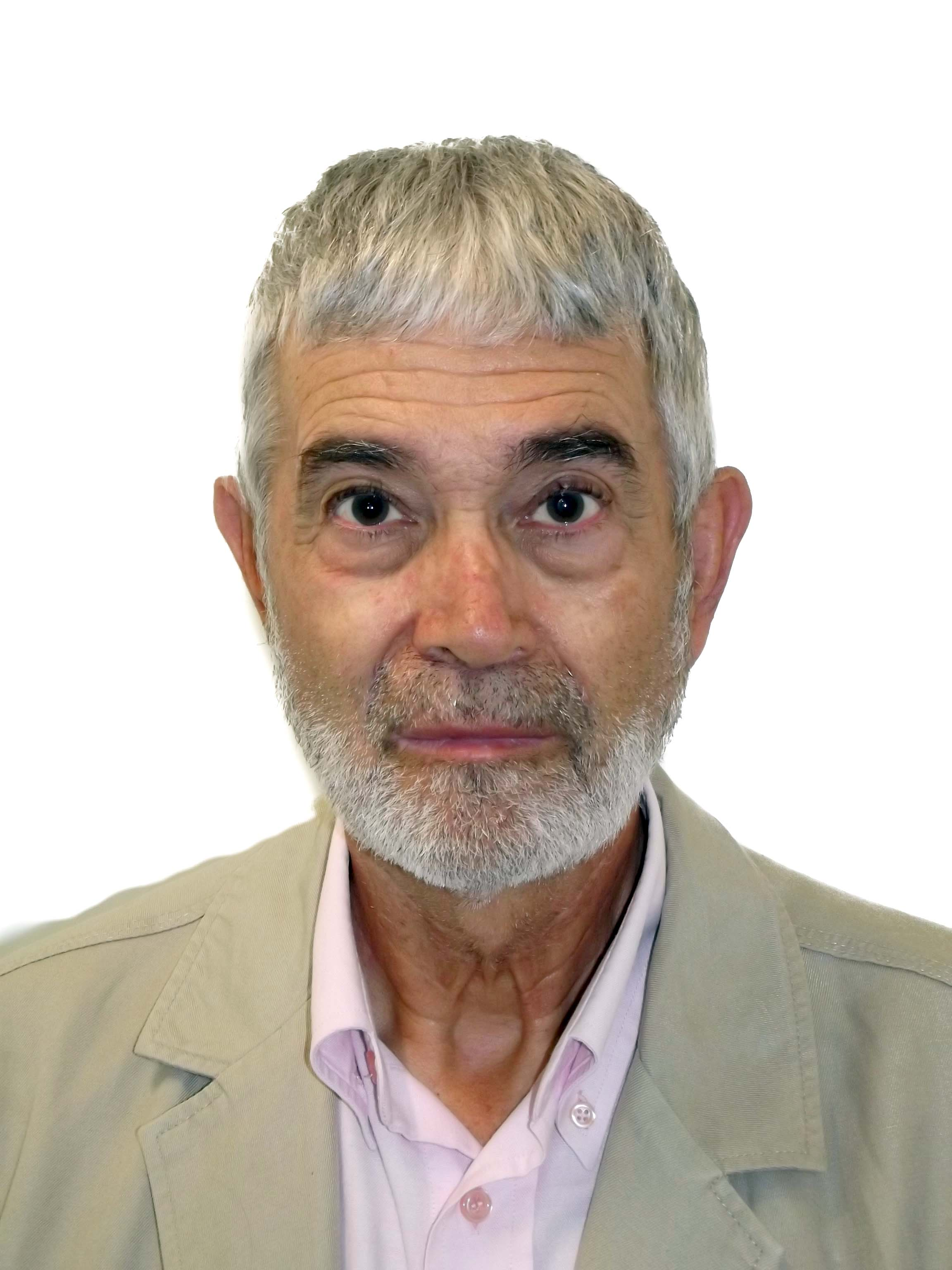
- Born: May 25, 1944 (age 82)
- Education: Degree in Philology and Phd and M.A. Studies in Irish literature.
- Alma mater: University Complutense of Madrid, University of Ulster
- Occupations: Professor at UNED, Director of the Institute of Celtic Studies (IEC)
- Writing career
- Language: Spanish and English
- Period: 1987 to 2013
- Subject: Celtic Studies
- Website: www.uned.es/estudiosceltas/

Ramon Sainero (born May 25, 1944) is the director of the Institute of Celtic Studies (IEC) of Spain and Associate Professor and Professor at UNED during the last 37 years.

== Studies ==
Ramon Sainero has a degree in Philology from the Universidad Complutense of Madrid. He attended PhD and M.A. studies in Irish literature in the New University of Ulster (Coleraine) and obtained his PhD in the Universidad Complutense of Madrid. He has attended intensive courses in Celtic languages and literature for over ten years in Ireland, at the Universities of Galway (Cararoe), Trinity College (Dublin), The University of Ulster (Coleraine) and Oideas Gael (Donegald). His university teaching has been given at the University of Ulster (Lector) and the Universidad Complutense (Lecturer).

== Field of Research ==
His field of research for many years has been focused on Celtic Studies and the influence of early Indo-European culture in the Iberian Peninsula and the British Isles. The commonly maintained theory is that the Celts, or at least Celtic Civilization, originated in central Europe, with Halstatt (Austria) and La Tene (Switzerland) as the principal sources of information on these origins. Although it appears evident that Central Europe was a key settlement site, from which the Celtic culture spread outwards, this does not mean the Celts, or the Celtic culture, originated from that part of Europe. The Danube, the Mediterranean Sea and Spain could also have constituted the site from which this invasive wave made its way into the interior of Europe, and this is a possibility that we should not discard. Nowadays a new theory has been developed with historical, archaeological, linguistic and cultural proofs, a theory that during centuries was considered only as mythology.

== Written works ==
Concerning this new theory, the following is a list of published studies he has authored:

- The Celtic Heritage in Spain and Ireland (1987) contract signed in 1984 and published in 1987 by Ed. Akal (Madrid). It offers some surprising evidences as that the pre-Iberian alphabet of Tartessos is very similar or the same as continental Runes.
- The Celts and Historical and Cultural Origins of Atlantic Europe, (The Celtic-Scythians in the Leabhar Gabhala) contract signed in 2003 andpublished in 2013 by Academica Press (USA).
- The Celtic origins of the kingdom of Brigantia: the genesis of Spain, contract signed in 2003 and published in 2009 by Ed. Abada (Madrid). Sainero points out that Celtic manuscripts speak of the Scythians (mentioned by Herodotus and Scolots) and Scots as the primitive origin of Celtic people. The aim of his research is not to reject any historical or archaeological theory, but rather to contribute further to the existing body of knowledge.
- A Historical and Linguistic reconstruction of Celts of the Iberian Peninsula, contract signed in 2012 and published in 2013, in which Sainero offers the lector a new way of studying the Celts and the primitive history and culture of the West Atlantic comparing Old Irish, Hispano-Celt and primitive Thracian languages.

== His Theories ==
He offers in his studies a series of surprising data according with the Irish manuscript Leabhar Gabhala (Book of Invasions) on that perhaps may demonstrate how many of the historical events described in this manuscript were not pure invention and that, moreover, provide a historical and literary interpretation much more truthful than has so far been thought to be the case.

At the estuary of the River Danube (Thrace), around the Black Sea and the eastern end of the Mediterranean, artistic, cultural and archaeological remains exist, some of which predate the 7th century BC, which point to the existence of a people, or series of people, with a shared religion and culture. The nearest inhabitants to them at that time, the Greeks, referred to them as Scythians, and many hypotheses exist that indicate that the Celtic culture was influenced by them in its origins, despite the fact that more complex forms were subsequently to develop.

It was these Scythians who, according to the Leabhar Gabhála (Book of Invasions), on their journey across the Mediterranean would sometimes, but not always, make their settlements first in Greece, then in Egypt, subsequently in Spain and finally in Ireland. It was their descendants who were to go on to create the early Celtic kingdoms of Spain and Ireland. Up to this point, the aforementioned book has been considered by many specialists to be a fabulous story full of fantasy.

One important and fundamental consideration in these books is that, when we refer to the Scythians (Scolots) and the Celto-Scythians (Thracian and/or Caucasian people?), we are in fact referring to Indo-European peoples who emanated out from the plains bordering on the Black Sea in a series of waves towards Central Europe, the Atlantic and the Mediterranean. According to him, It would perhaps be more accurate to speak of tribes, clans or waves of Indo-European migrants, but it is the Celtic manuscripts that speak of the Scythians and Scots (¿Scits or Scolots?) as the primitive origin of Celtic people.

It is important to point out that the Scythians did not leave behind any written documentation. Presumably, they did not have a written language in this sense, but their Greek, Persian, Assyrian and Phoenician neighbours did, and indeed left us clear information on their history and culture. Their migrations were sometimes rapidly undertaken and took them long distances from their previous site, on which basis it is not surprising that the primitive documents, acceptable or not, make references to the Scots in Ireland (people connected in their pilgrimage with Thracians, Greeks, Spaniards and other people). Sainero also credits them with possessing a significant army, capable of defeating, at certain times in history, the most fearsome armies of the era, such as the Medes, Persians and Assyrians.

His comparison, following the above example is this: Approximately one thousand two hundred years previously, the peoples settled on the plains on the shores of Thracia and/or the Caucasus Sea, the Scythians and other nearby communities with settlements in Greece or Asia Minor, nomadic and skilled warriors and horsemen, were able, our evidence shows, to conquer some territories in Europe and, assimilating the culture of those they conquered, to go on to create a new civilization: the Celtic civilization.

=== Bibliography on this theory ===
- Lorca y Synge ¿Un mundo maldito?, Ed. Complutense (Madrid), 1983.
- Leyendas celtas en la literatura irlandesa. Ed. Akal (Madrid), 1985.
- Leabhar Ghabhála (Libro de las Invasiones), Introducción, traducción, glosario y notas, Ed. Akal (Madrid), 1987.
- La huella celta en España e Irlanda, Ed. Akal (Madrid), 1987.
- Los grandes mitos celtas y su influencia en la literatura, Ed. Edicomunicación (Barcelona), 1988.
- Sagas celtas primitivas en la literatura inglesa, Ed. Akal (Madrid), 1993.
- Lenguas y literaturas celtas: origen y evolución, Ed. Aula Abierta (UNED), 1994.
- La literatura anglo-irlandesa y sus orígenes, Ed. Akal (Madrid), 1995.
- Diccionario Akal de mitología celta, Ed. Akal, (Madrid), 1999.
- Literatura Inglesa: Problemas y técnicas en la traducción e interpretación de sus textos. Ed. UNED (Madrid), 1999.
- Los orígenes celtas del reino de Brigantia (La génesis de España), Ed. Abada (Madrid), 2008. Os orígenes do pobo de Breogán, Ed. Biblos (A Coruña) 2008.
- The Celts and Historical and Cultural Origins of Western Europe, Ed. Academica Press (EEUU), 2013.
- La leyenda de Breogán y sus orígenes, Ed. Akal (Madrid), 2013.
- Una reconstrucción histórica y lingüística del celta hispano, Ed. Abada (Madrid), 2013.

== Publishing Forthcoming ==
Ramon Sainero is going to publish with Ediciones Akal the following titles:

- Arturo Dux Bellorum: un rey, una espada, una leyenda.
- Fin Mac Cumhill y sus guerreros los Fianna (Ciclo Osiánico).
- Los orígenes históricos y mitológicos de la Península Ibérica en los manuscritos celtas primitivos.
