= Ana María Vázquez Hoys =

Spanish historian

Ana María Vázquez Hoys (born 8 October 1945) is a Spanish ancient history professor and book author. She collaborates in educational radio and television programs and gives talks at conferences on Ancient History. She studied at the Universidad Complutense de Madrid (UCM, Complutense University of Madrid) before becoming a teacher at the Universidad Nacional de Educación a Distancia (UNED, National University of Distance Education) in Madrid, Spain.

== Biography ==
Ana María Vázquez Hoys was born on 8 October 1945 in Madrid, Spain, the second of two children in a conservative Christian Catholic middle-class family. Her complete first name is 'Ana María del Carmen Milagrosa' (although only 'Ana María' is used). Her mother was Ana María Hoys Rebollal. Her father, Francisco Vázquez Llorente, worked in the military. She married in 1971 Carlos Martín Martínez, with whom she had two children. They divorced in 1993.

Vázquez obtained a bachelor's degree in geography and history from the Universidad Complutense de Madrid in June 1969. She obtained a PhD in ancient history cum laude in 1974. She became tutor of ancient history in the Centro Asociado of UNED in Madrid in 1980. She became professor (Profesora Titular) of ancient history in the Department of Prehistory and Ancient History of UNED in Madrid in 1984 (EC 7550).

Since the 1980s, Vázquez has written many academic books and articles related to ancient history, participated in international conferences and collaborated in radio and television programs. Since 2009 she has appeared regularly in programmes from the Spanish radio stations 'Dial' and 'Europa_FM', mainly with presenter Javier Cárdenas. In 2010, she published her first historic novel, set in Ancient Egypt, El Sol Negro (The Black Sun).

== Memberships ==
- Asociación Española de Amigos de la Arqueología
- Asociación Española de Estudios Clásicos
- Asociación Internacional de Estudios Romanos
- International Council of Indo-European and Thracian Studies
- The Oriental Institute of the University of Chicago
- Centro de Estudios del Próximo Oriente (CEPO)

== Selected works ==
- Antiguo Egipto. Arlanza Ediciones, Madrid 2000, ISBN 84-930737-2-5 (obra completa), ISBN 84-930737-4-1 (volumen 4).
- Diccionario de magia en el mundo antiguo. Ed. Alderabán, Madrid 1997. ISBN 84-88676-16-6.
- Los viejos dioses no han muerto. Ed. Aguilar, Madrid 1996. ISBN 84-03-59516-6.
- Diana en la religiosidad hispanorromana. Tomo I. Las fuentes. Las diferentes diosas. Ed. UNED, Madrid 1995. ISBN 84-362-3327-1.
- Diana en la religiosidad hispanorromana. Tomo II. Roma, Cuenca y Segóbriga. Ed. UNED, Madrid 1996. ISBN 84-362-3718-8. ISBN 84-362-3717-X (obra completa).
- Términos de magia y religión en el mundo antiguo. Ed. UNED, Madrid 1995. ISBN 84-362-3308-5.
- Diccionario del Mundo Antiguo. I. Próximo Oriente, Egipto, Grecia y Roma. Madrid. Ed. Alianza, Madrid 1994. ISBN 84-206-0690-1.
- El mundo griego. De los inicios a la conquista romana. II: Grecia desde el siglo IV. Alejandro Magno. El helenismo. CU 118, Ed. UNED, Madrid 1994. ISBN 84-362-2843-X (tomo II), 84-362-2841-3 (obra completa).
- Diccionario de símbolos y términos mágicos. Ed. UNED, Madrid 1993. ISBN 84-362-2997-5.
- Introducción a la Arqueología III. El II milenio en el Próximo Oriente. Ramón Areces, Madrid 1989. ISBN 84-87191-06-1.
- Introducción a la H^{a} Antigua I. Próximo Oriente y Egipto. Madrid, Cuadernos de la UNED 018, 2^{a} ed. 1989. ISBN 84-362-2457-4.
- La religión romana en Hispania. Fuentes epigráficas, arqueológicas y numismáticas. Tesis Doctoral. Madrid, 1974 (Servicio de publicaciones de la Universidad Complutense) (2 tomos). Madrid 1982. Colección Tésis Doctorales. Universidad Complutense, Madrid, n^{o} 114/82.Depósito legal M-18177-1982.
- Historia de Roma I. La República Romana. Madrid, Ed. UNED, 2002.
- Arcana mágica : diccionario de símbolos y términos mágicos. Madrid, Ed. UNED, 2003. ISBN 84-362-4269-6.
- Historia del Mundo Antiguo, vol. I Próximo Oriente, y II ( II: Egipto, fenicios, Israel, Irán). Ed. Sanz y Torres, Madrid 2004, ISBN 84-96094-29-4.
- Historia de las religiones Antiguas: Próximo Oriente.. Tomo I. Editorial Sanz y Torres, Madrid, Febrero 2006. ISBN 84-96094-59-6.
- Historia del mundo antiguo, II : el mundo mediterráneo hasta Augusto : Macedonia, Alejandro Magno, reinos helenísticos, Roma I. Ed. Sanz y Torres, Madrid 2005. ISBN 84-96094-49-9.
- Historia del Mundo Antiguo. Tomo II. Grecia. Ed. Sanz y Torres, 2007. ISBN 978-84-96808-00-3.
- Golondrinas de Tartessos. Aquí escribimos primero. Ed. Almuzara, Córdoba 2008. ISBN 978-84-88586-90-2.
