= Monte Porreiro (Pontevedra) =

Neighbourhood in Pontevedra, Spain

- Neighbourhood of Pontevedra
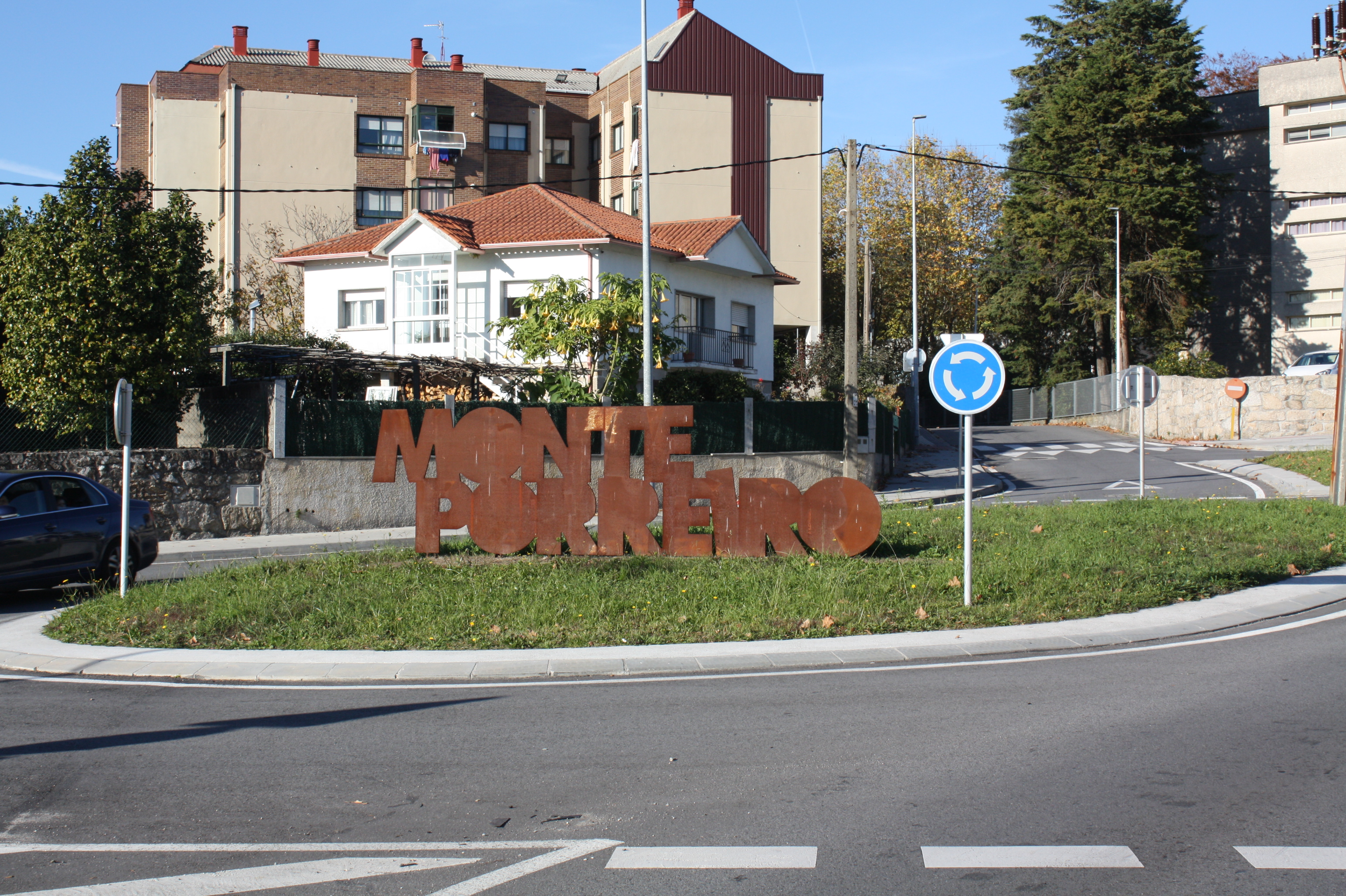
- Roundabout at the western entrance to the district
- Coordinates: 42°26′47.1″N 8°37′25.1″W
- Country: Spain
- City: Pontevedra

Population
  - Total: 8,000
- Postal code: 36162

Monte Porreiro is a residential area in the city of Pontevedra (Spain). It is the seat of the National University of Distance Education in the province of Pontevedra. The neighbourhood has a health centre, a school and a high school and a parish church since the end of the 20th century, its patron saint being the Good Shepherd. There are also green areas, the most important being the Belvedere Park.

== Location ==
Monte Porreiro is a district located in the north-east of the city. It is bordered to the north and west by the Lérez River, to the east by the Mourente district and to the south by the A Seca district.

== Etymology ==
The name Monte Porreiro has its origin in the steepness of the terrain of the area. Porreiro comes from porro-porrera meaning abundant slopes and the name of the neighbourhood Monte Porreiro refers to a "mountain with steep slopes".

== History ==
At the beginning of the 20th century, in 1900, Casimiro Gómez, a wealthy landowner, bought a 70-hectare estate in Monte Porreiro, the former farmhouse of San Antonio Abad, which he called Villa Buenos Aires. He called it this because of his close connection with Argentina, where he had made his fortune. He turned it into a beautiful and rich farm where he spent his holidays. He grew vines and fruit trees, reserving a large area of land for livestock. The products of the estate received important prizes in various exhibitions.

To make the most of the richness of the medicinal mineral springs in the area, he carried out a project to create a thermal spa. The high society of Pontevedra at the beginning of the 20th century attended the inauguration of the Lérez Spa on 22 August 1906. The hotel and spa created in 1906 by Casimiro Gómez were a meeting point for influential politicians, aristocrats and royalty of the time, who enjoyed the medicinal waters (from the Monte Porreiro and Aceñas springs) and the walking paths that surrounded this estate, which has now disappeared. Casimiro Gómez marketed the mineral waters under the brand name Aguas Lérez in bottles for domestic consumption which were sold in countries such as the United States, England, Egypt, India and Australia. In 1907, the brand received several awards and King Alfonso XIII himself congratulated Casimiro Gómez on its high quality. In the same year, he was awarded the title of supplier to the Spanish Royal Household. The Infanta Elena de Bourbon, who visited the baths in 1914, the Marquis of Riestra, Montero Ríos, Cobián Roffignac and the minister José Canalejas, among others, were illustrious visitors to the baths.

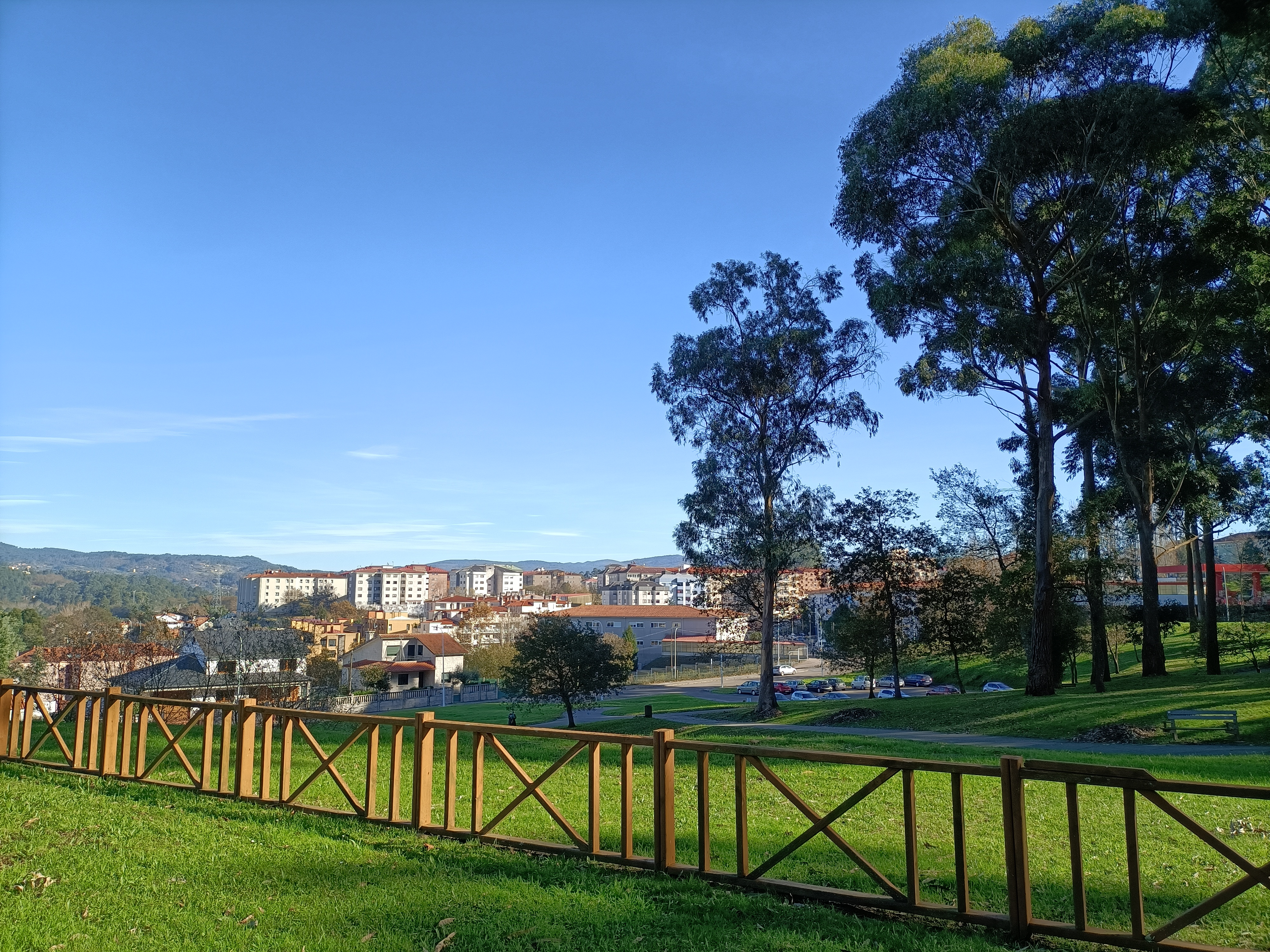
Partial view of the neighbourhood from the Belvedere Park.

When the First World War broke out, Casimiro Gómez returned to Argentina to become a supplier to the countries participating in the Great War. He returned to Monte Porreiro at the end of the war, but the fashion for spas was over and the activity of the estate was reoriented towards an experimental farm. He built one of the first tennis courts in Galicia on his estate.

The Monte Porreiro neighbourhood was developed on the basis of a Partial Plan derived from the General Plan of 1968, in which the former large Villa Buenos Aires estate was included as residential reserve land. In 1969, a model was presented of what was then called the gigantic Monte Porreiro housing estate, in which more than 2,000 dwellings of different types were planned in an area of 68 hectares. In the 1970s, the urban organisation and development of Monte Porreiro began, with the construction of a number of houses in the Reino Unido street, which was followed by modern towers on the highest slope of the estate.

In 1973, the headquarters of the Regional Centre of the National University of Distance Education was inaugurated in Pontevedra and in 1987 it was moved to Monte Porreiro.

In 20 years, the crop fields and pastures have become an outlying dormitory district very close to the urban centre, with a large part of the neighbourhood's buildings being constructed in the 1980s. In November 1988, the Luis Seoane Secondary School was inaugurated in the neighbourhood.

In November 1995, the tender for the construction of the Monte Porreiro health centre was announced, which was inaugurated in 1997.

The Catholic parish church of the Good Shepherd was inaugurated by Julián Barrio, the archbishop of Santiago de Compostela, on 9 October 2010. Its plan is in the shape of a Scallop shell.

In 2011, the new bridge across the Lérez River was inaugurated, connecting the district to the civil parish of Lérez and the monastery of San Salvador de Lérez.

Since 2020, the Plaza de Europa park has had a 20-metre long zip line. In May 2020 the municipality of Pontevedra created a Metrominuto for the neighbourhood.

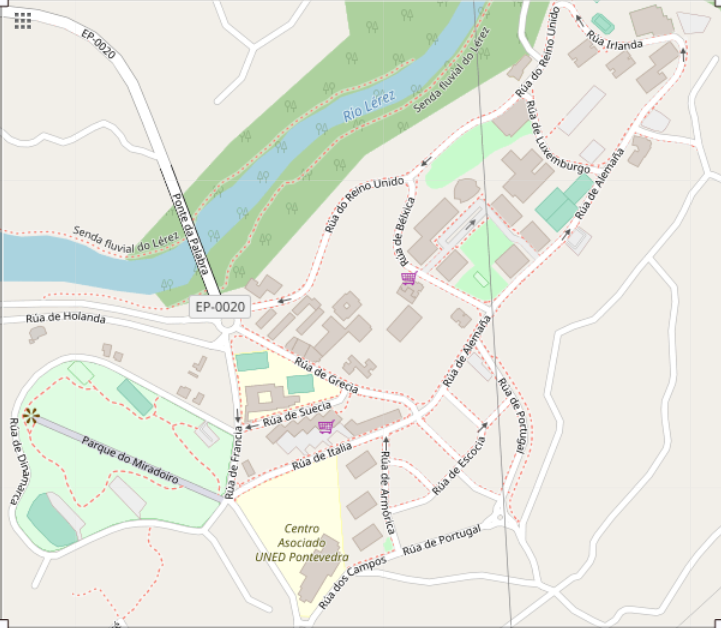
Monte Porreiro map

== Urban planning ==
Monte Porreiro is a neighbourhood on the outskirts of Pontevedra, north-east of the city centre. It stretches along the Lérez river. The streets in the neighbourhood are named after European countries: France, Sweden, Denmark, the Netherlands, the United Kingdom, Portugal, Luxembourg, Ireland, Germany, Belgium and Greece. The central square of the neighbourhood is the Europe Square.

To the west of the neighbourhood is the Belvedere Park and to the east the UNED Park, which were part of the Buenos Aires villa, whose owner was Casimiro Gómez.

Very close to the neighbourhood, downstream, is the Lérez Beach.

== Facilities ==
The headquarters of the regional centre of the National University of Distance Education, the UNED Associated Centre of Pontevedra inaugurated in 1973, has been located in the area since 1987. Educational facilities include the Luis Seoane High School, the Marcos Portela School, the Fina Casalderrey Nursery School and the A Galiña Azul Nursery.

There is also a health centre and a parish church, and sports facilities include a football and rugby field.

The Pontevedra-Universidad railway station is close to the neighbourhood.

== Festivities and cultural events ==
The neighbourhood festivities take place every year around the 4 and 5 May and are dedicated to the patron saint of Monte Porreiro, the Good Shepherd.

== Gallery ==
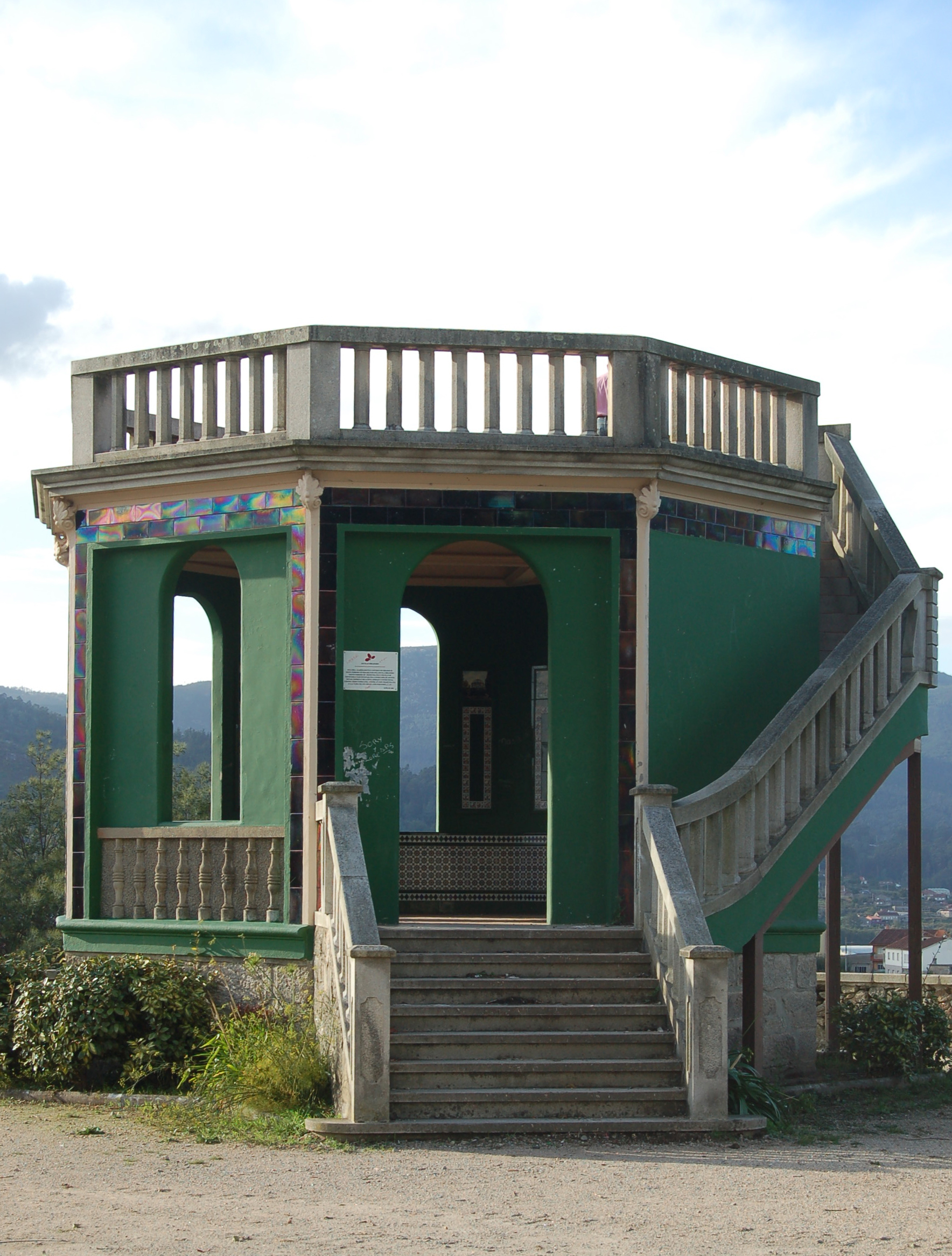
Belvedere Park

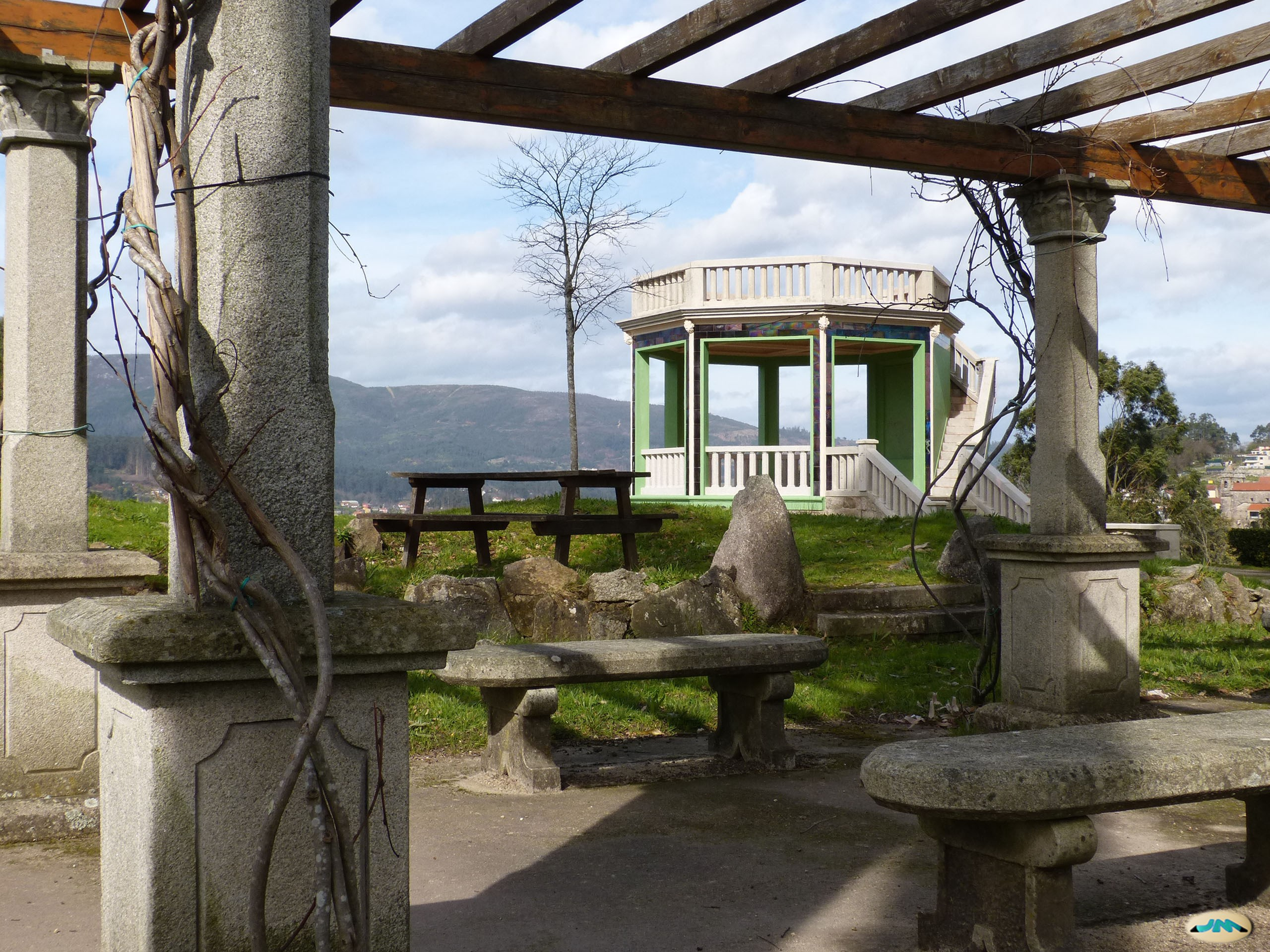
Belvedere Park

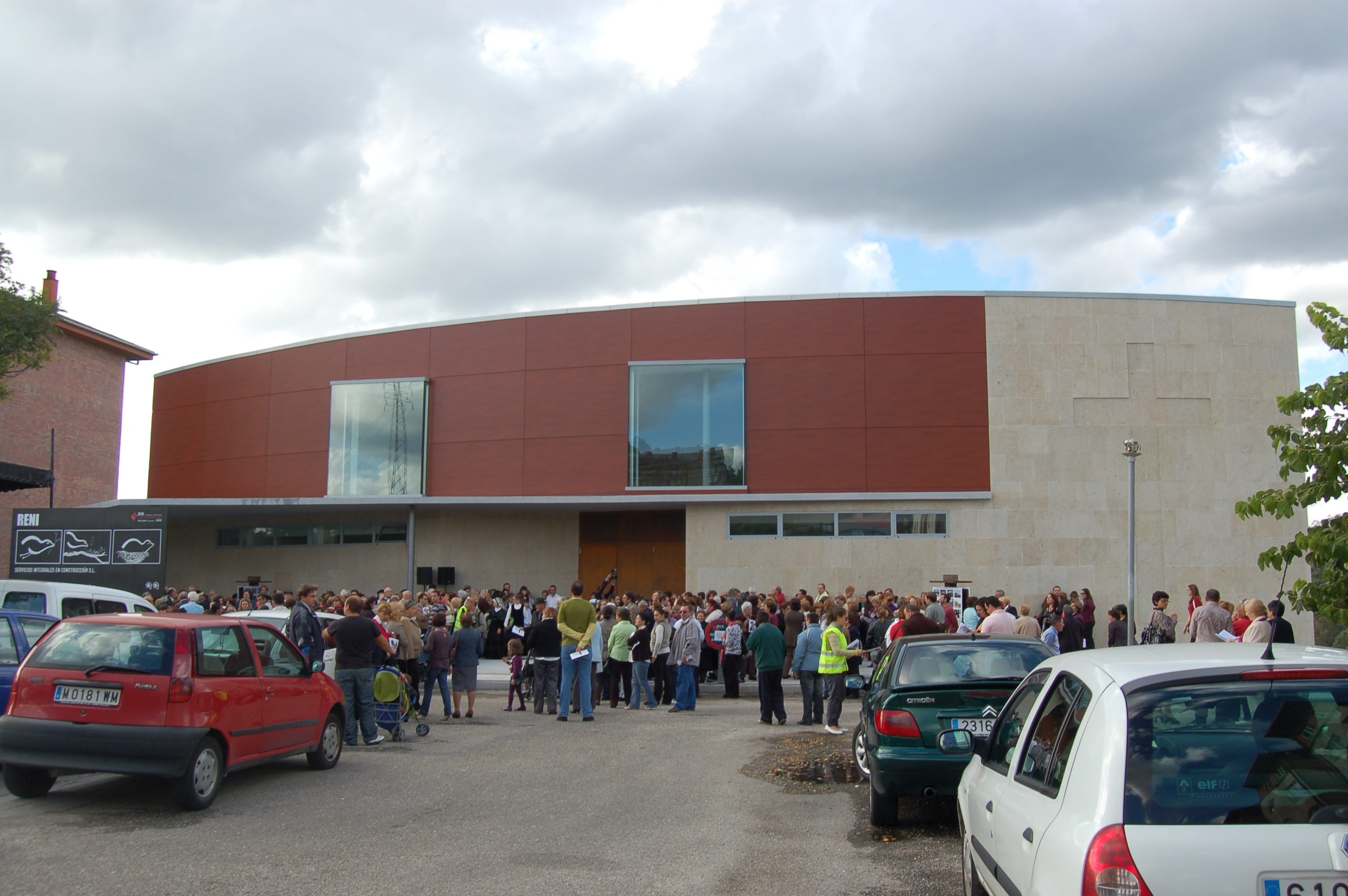
Buen Pastor church

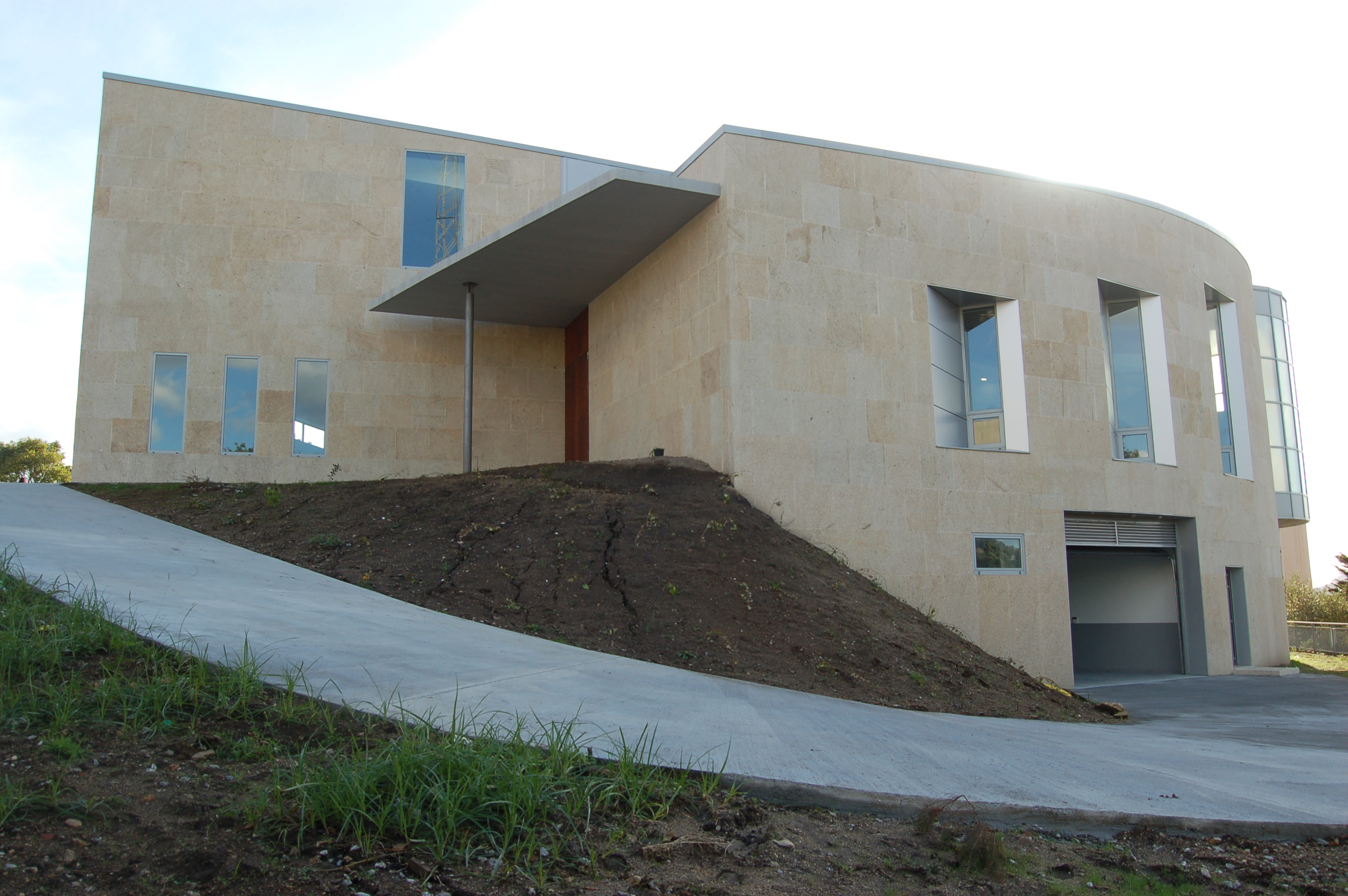
Local church

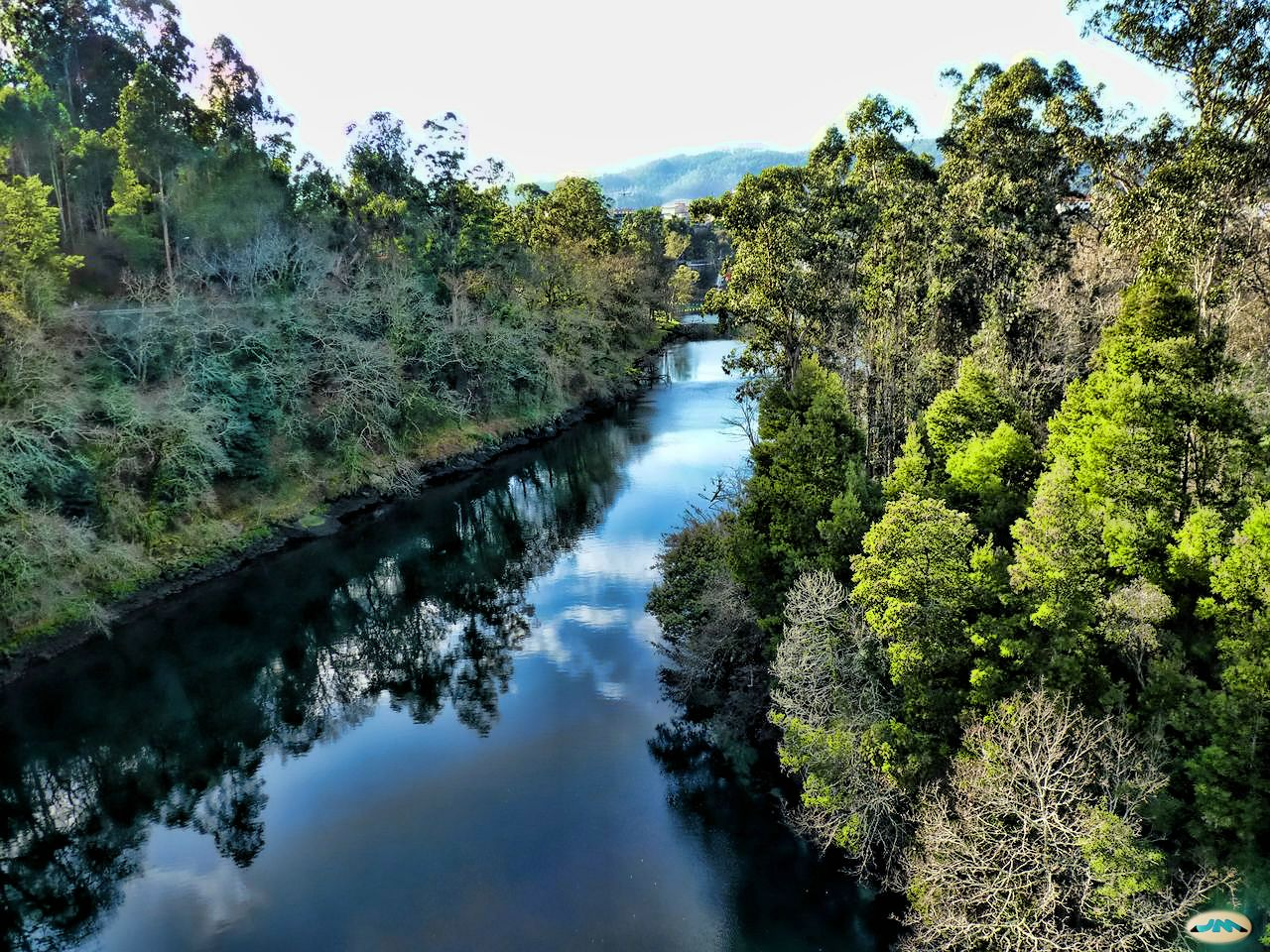
Lérez River

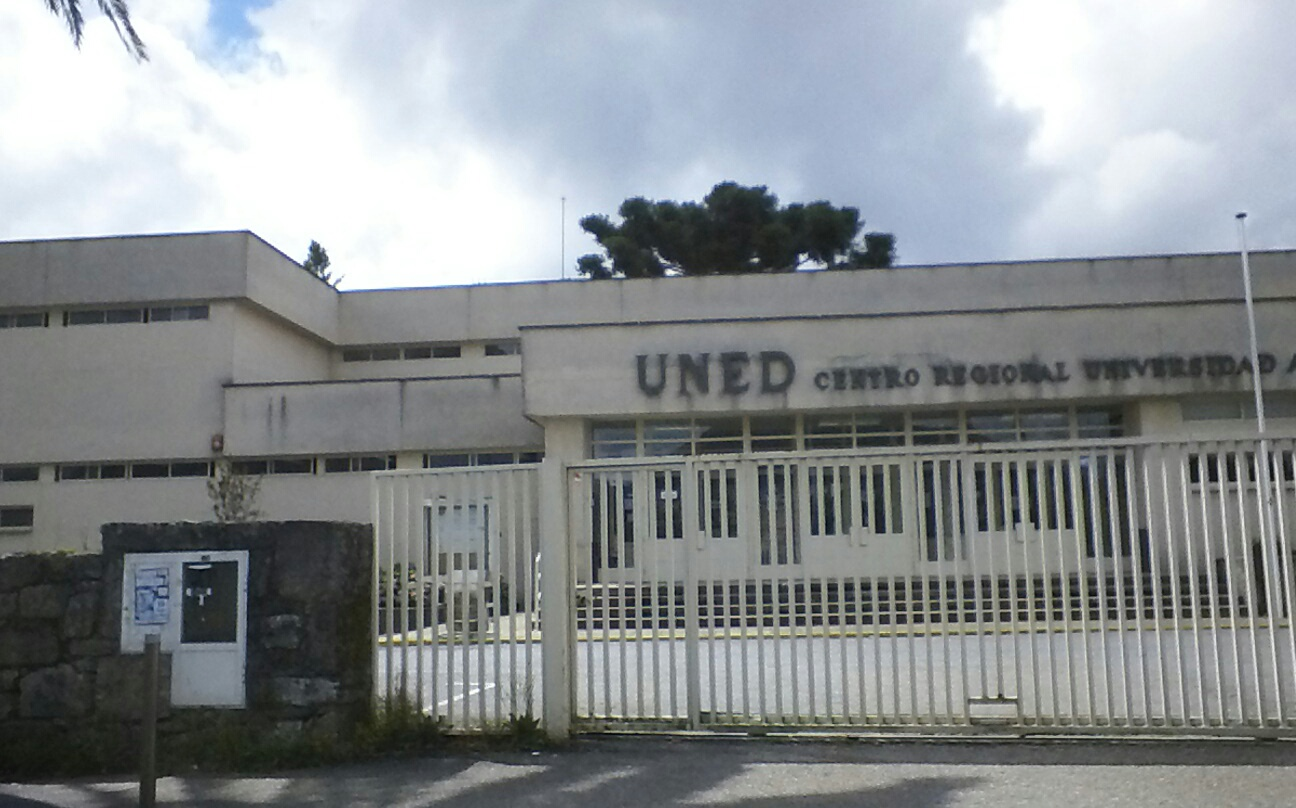
Headquarters of the National University for Distance Education

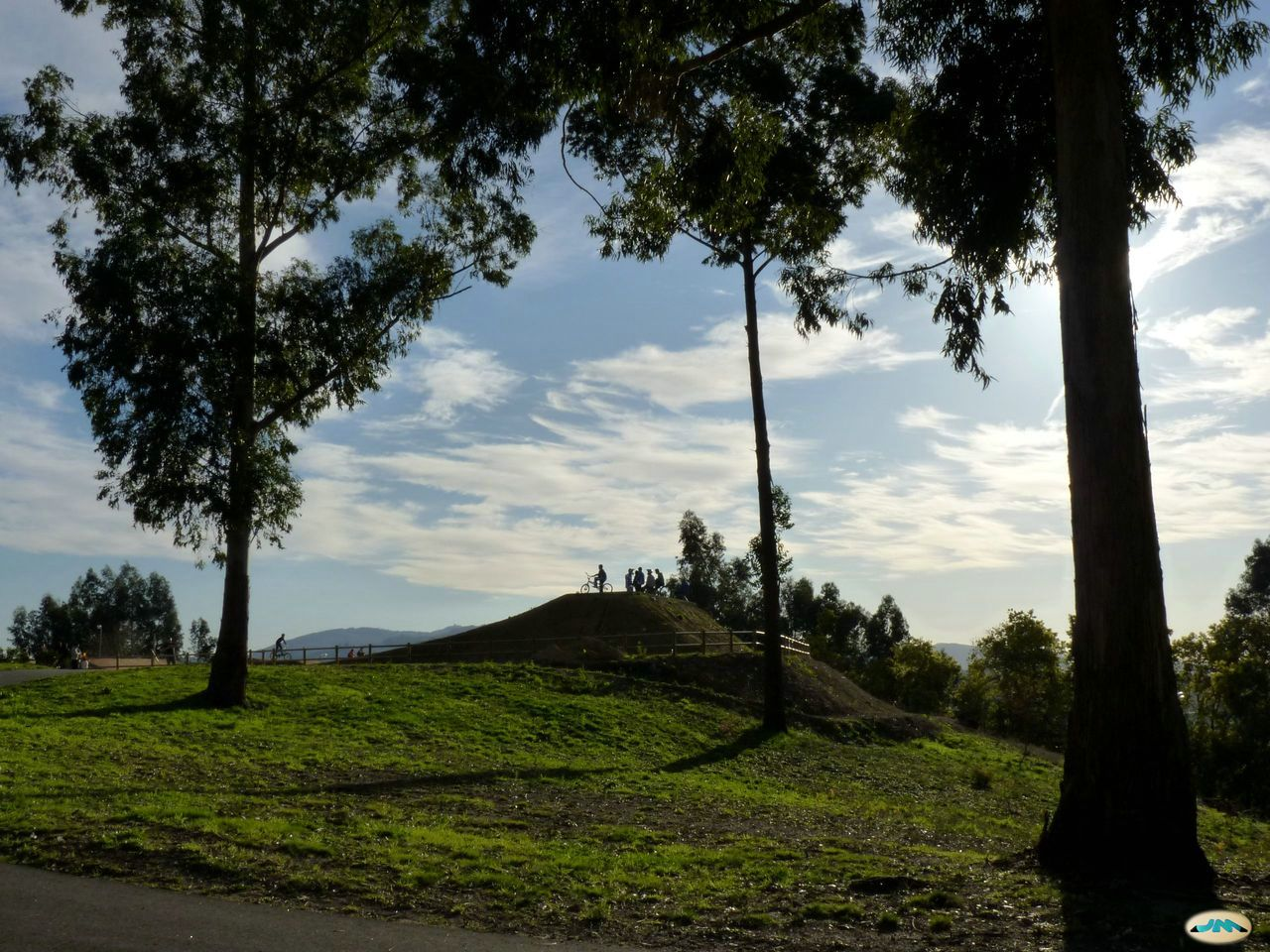
Gymkhana track

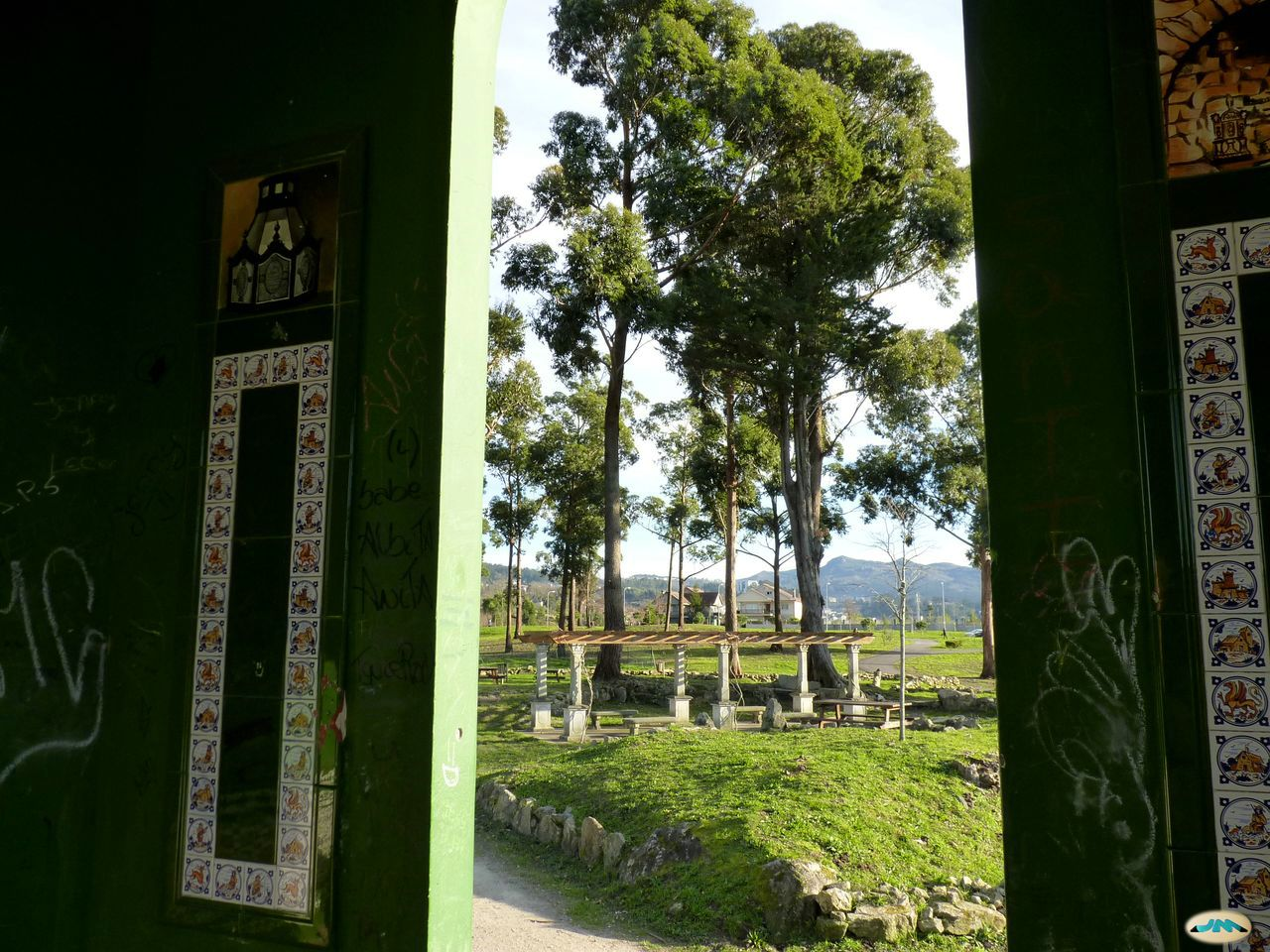
Pergola from inside the lookout point

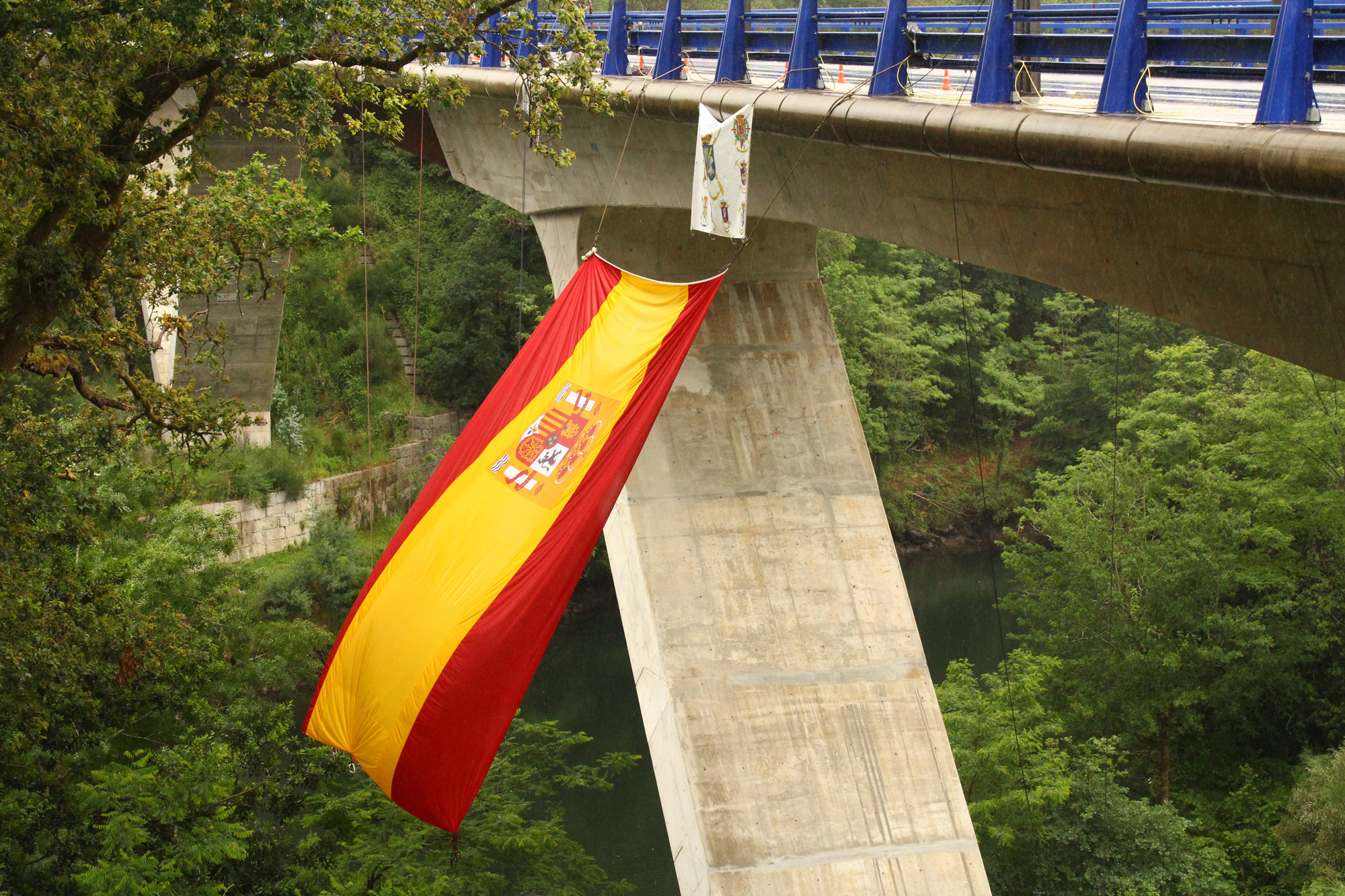
Word Bridge

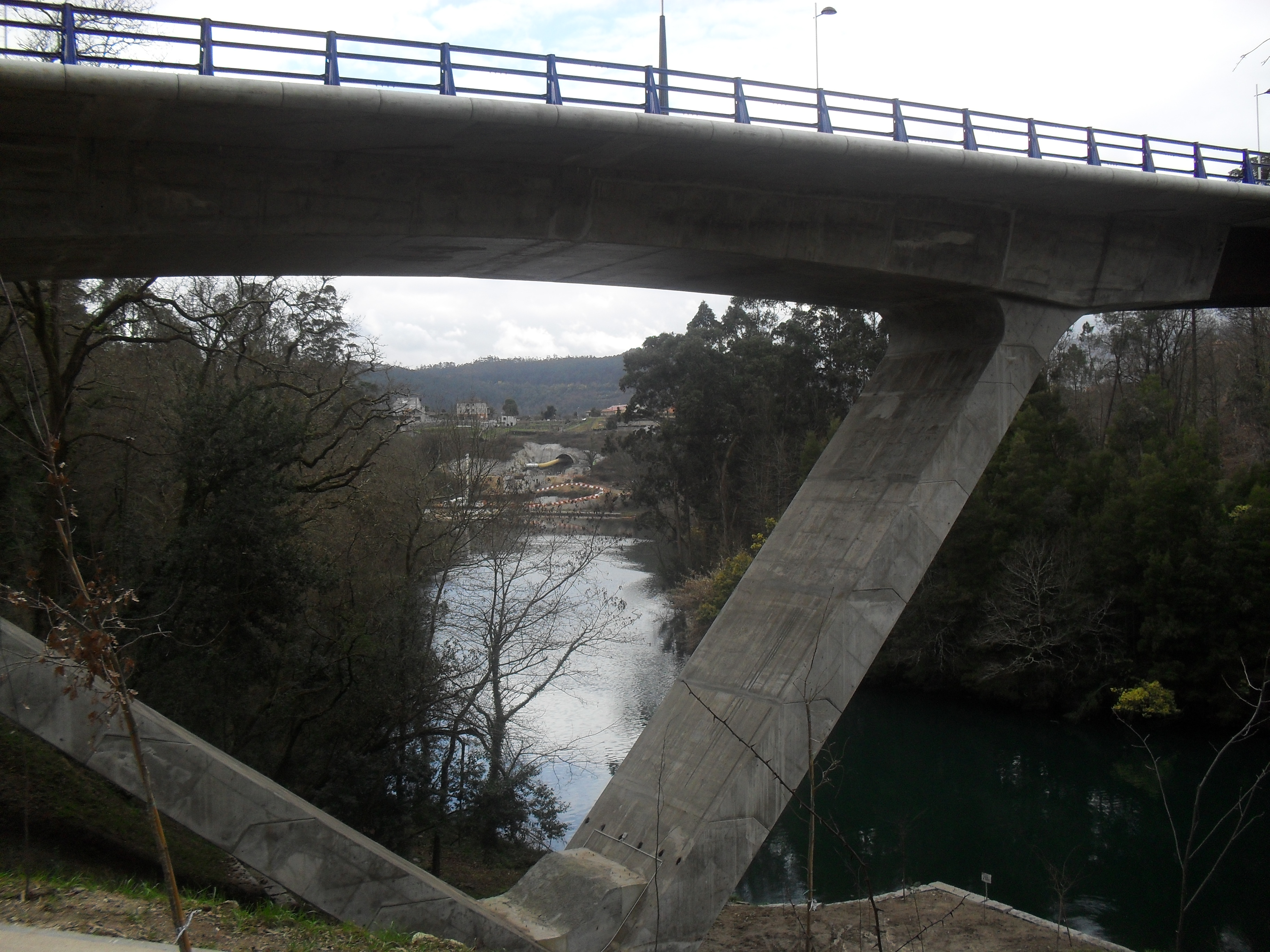
Word Bridge

== See also ==
=== Bibliography ===
- Mateo Sanz, Gonzalo (2020). "La naturaleza en la toponimia española VII". Flora Montibérica (in Spanish). 77. Valencia: FloraMontiberica.org. ISSN 1138-5952.

=== Related articles ===
- UNED Associated Centre of Pontevedra
- Belvedere Park
- Word Bridge
- Lérez River
- Valdecorvos

=== External links ===
- Monte Porreiro Health Centre
- Project to redevelop the neighbourhood
- O Mirador association
