= Word Bridge =

Delta-leg bridge in Pontevedra, Spain

Word Bridge Puente de la Palabra
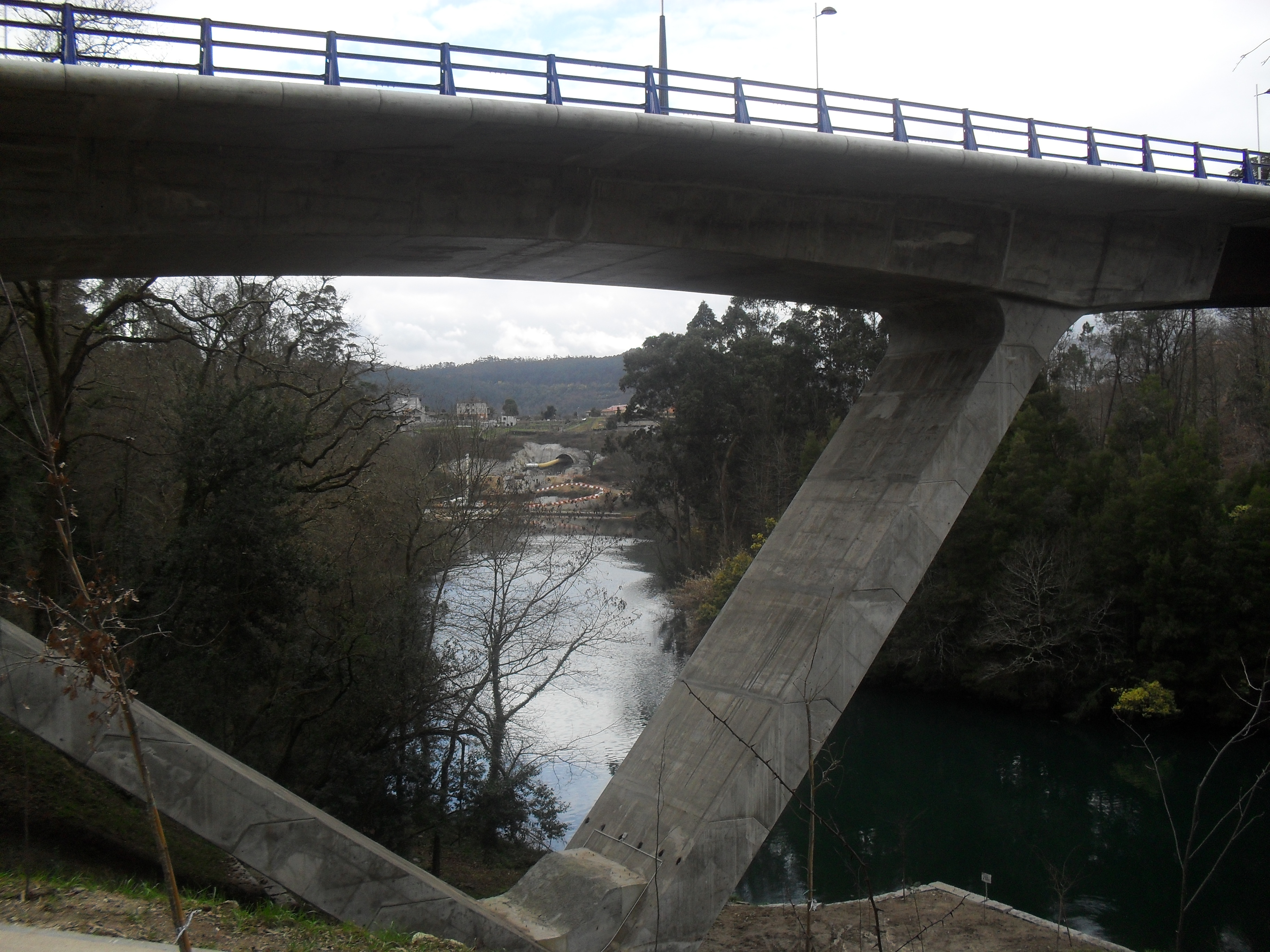
- Word Bridge
- Coordinates: 42.447083°N 8.627639°W
- Carries: Motor vehicles, cyclists and pedestrians
- Crosses: Lérez River
- Locale: Pontevedra, Spain

Characteristics
- Design: Delta-leg
- Material: Reinforced concrete Pre-stressed concrete
- Total length: 170.48 m (559.3 ft)
- Width: 14.70 m (48.2 ft)

History
- Construction start: 2010
- Construction end: 2011
- Opened: 30 December 2011

The Word Bridge is a delta-leg bridge that crosses the Lérez River in the Monte Porreiro district of the city of Pontevedra (Spain). It was inaugurated in 2011 and connects the Monte Porreiro neighbourhood with the civil parish of Lérez.

== Location ==
The bridge is located in the lower part of the Monte Porreiro district, at the end of Buenos Aires Avenue, 500 metres from the Lérez beach, upstream.

== History ==
The project for the construction of the Word Bridge was born in the 2000s out of the need to connect the Monte Porreiro neighbourhood with the civil parish of Lérez by a road to the Porta do Sol area, very close to the Saint Saviour's Monastery of Lérez. At the same time, the aim was to improve access to the Montecelo Hospital from the north of the municipality and the N-550 road to the N-541 and to relieve congestion in the city.

The Provincial Council of Pontevedra launched the tender for the project and the works in 2007. After several ups and downs, construction of the bridge finally began in 2010. It was inaugurated on 30 December 2011 by the then Minister of Public Works, Ana Pastor. It thus became the sixth bridge in the city.

On 21 March 2012, on the occasion of Poetry Day, the writer Fina Casalderrey sponsored an event in which schoolchildren from Monte Porreiro and Lérez took part and proposed that the bridge be called the Bridge of the Word as a symbolic union between these two districts of Pontevedra and as a sign of harmony, friendship and encounter.

== Description ==
It is a bridge consisting of two series of V-shaped pillars made of reinforced concrete. These pillars do not affect the riverbed, a protected site declared a Site of Community Importance (SCI) in 2000.

The total length of the Word Bridge is 170.48 metres. The central girder, which forms the central span of the bridge, is 14.70 metres wide and has a total length of 54 metres. The deck is made of pre-stressed concrete and the abutments and legs are made of reinforced concrete.

The bridge has two lanes for vehicle traffic, a cycle track, two pedestrian pavements, blue metal guard rails and lighting. It is equipped with speed bumps at the end closest to Monte Porreiro and the speed limit is 30 kilometres per hour.

== Galerie ==
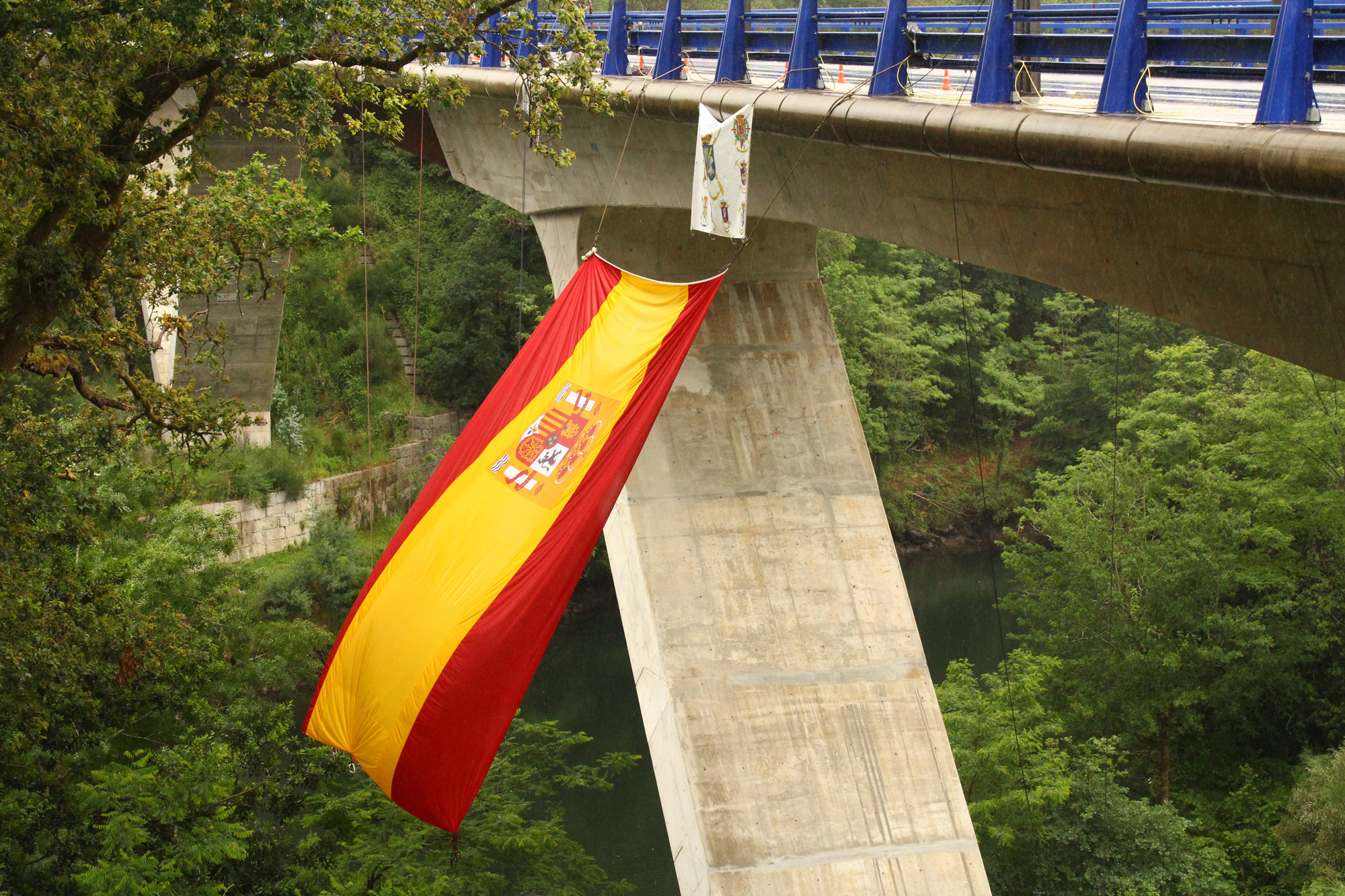
V-shaped bridge pillars and blue guardrail

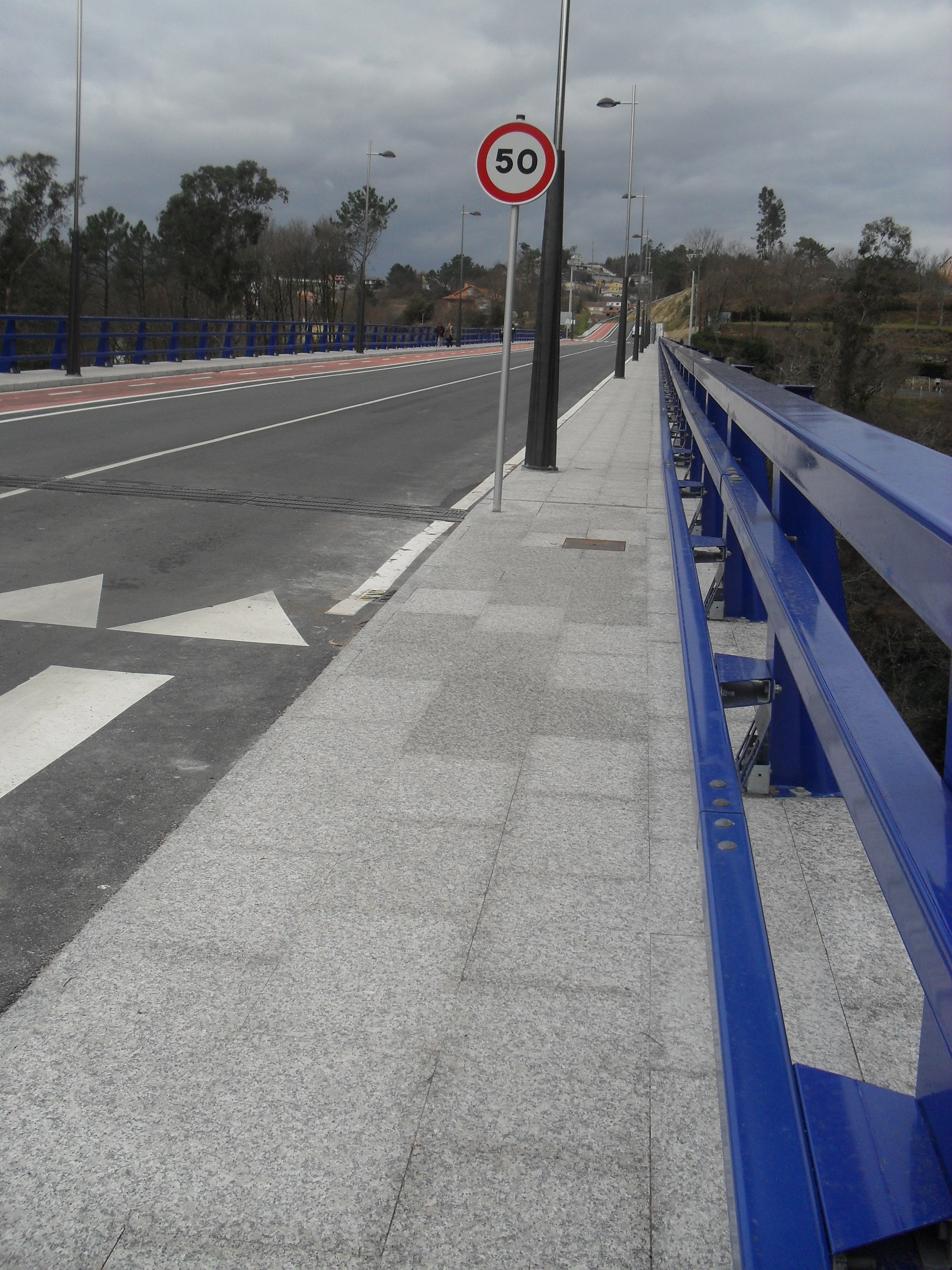
The bridge with the cycle lane on the left side

== See also ==
=== Related articles ===
- Currents Bridge
- Barca Bridge
- Burgo Bridge
- Tirantes Bridge
- Santiago Bridge
- Puente Sampayo Bridge

=== External links ===
- Structurae: Word Bridge
