= Placeres Beach =

Beach in Pontevedra, Spain

- Beach
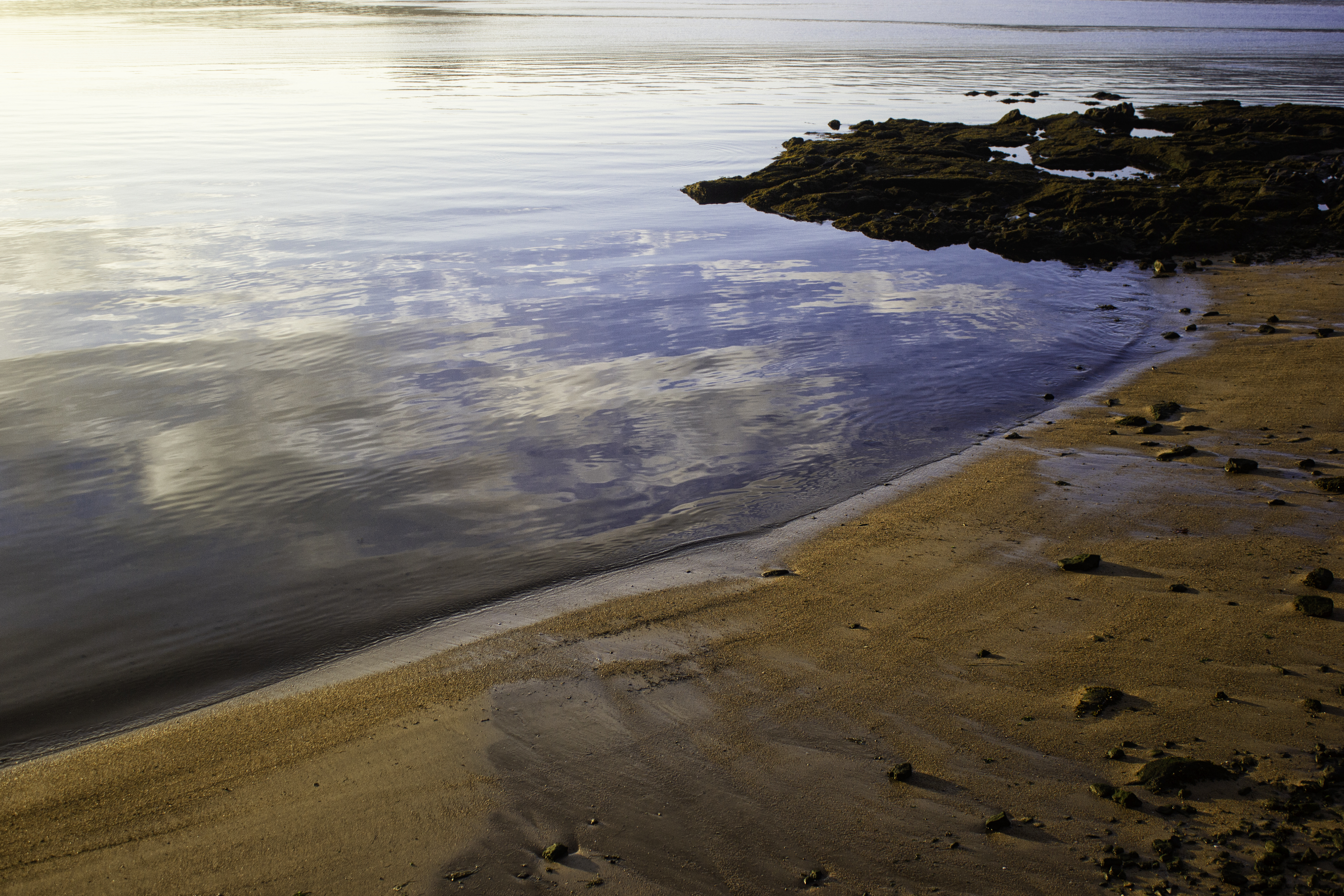
- Placeres beach, Lourizán, Pontevedra

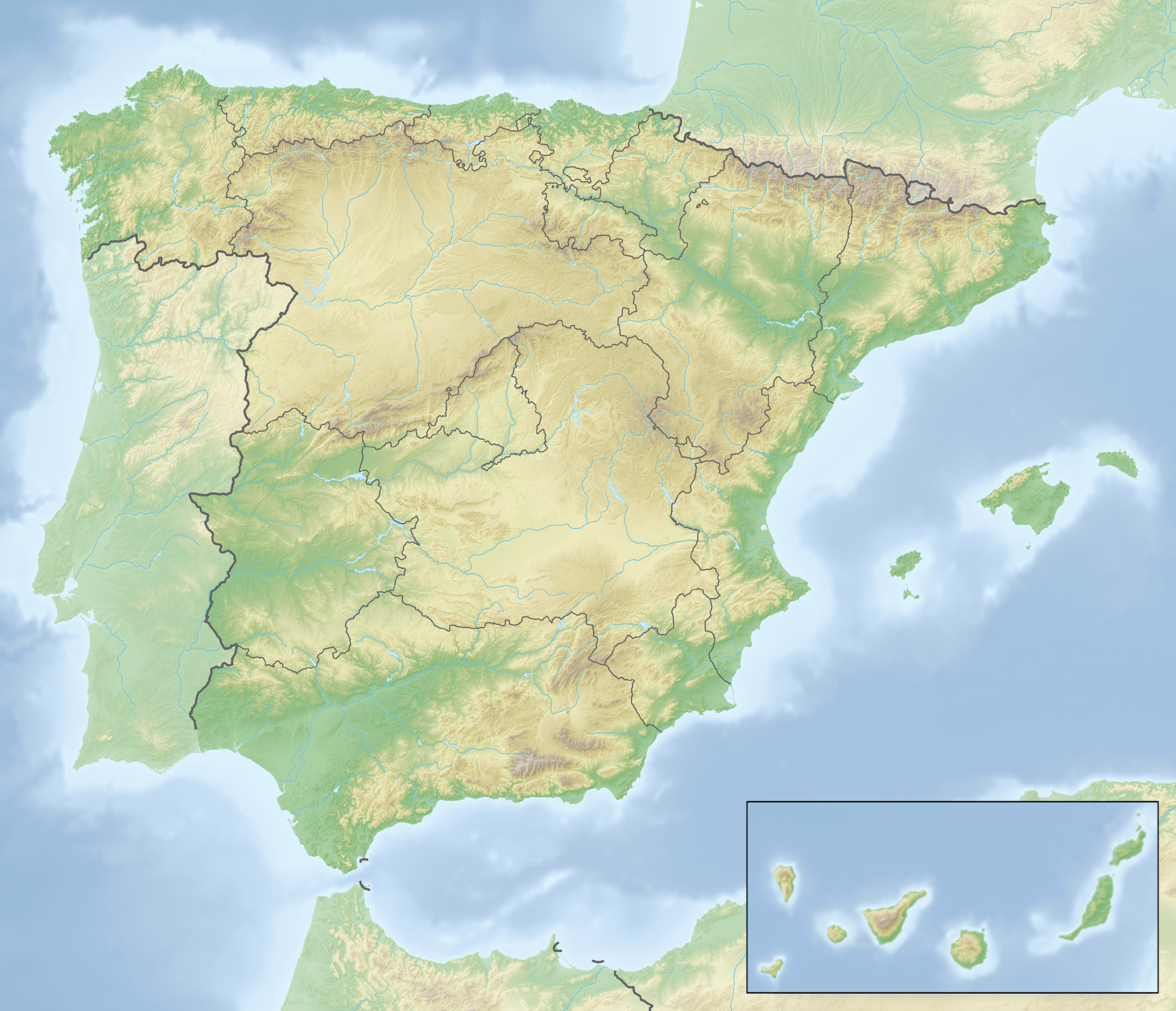
- Coordinates: 42°24′21″N 8°41′05″W
- Location: Pontevedra

Dimensions
  - Length: 50 metres (160 ft)
  - Width: 15 metres (49 ft)

Placeres Beach or A Posta Beach is a Galician beach located in the Spanish municipality of Pontevedra, in the province of Pontevedra. It is a semi-urban coastal beach 50 metres long.

== Location and access ==
The beach is located in the civil parish of Lourizán, on the left bank of the Ria de Pontevedra, 4 kilometres from the city and less than a kilometre from the Estribela neighbourhood. It lies between the port's shipyards and Cape Los Placeres.

== History ==
At the end of the 19th century, the social life of Pontevedra during the summer, animated by tourists and holidaymakers, moved to the surrounding beaches, in particular Placeres beach, which was the fashionable beach during the Restoration period and was linked to the city by a tramway.

At the beginning of the 20th century, to the right of the beach at O Cabo point on the Placeres isthmus, the Gran Hotel de Baños de Mar de Los Placeres was opened in 1902, owned by Eugenio Montero Ríos, who welcomed guests and holidaymakers. In 1918, after his death, it was donated by his son Avelino Montero to the nuns of the Sacred Heart and became the College of the Sacred Heart of Placeres.

In the spring of 1936, press advertisements focused on hotels, restaurants, bathing establishments and the Placeres beach for tourists, for which the tram service offered travel tickets for 10 round trips at 4.25 pesetas. In the class society of the time, bathing at Placeres beach was a popular summer pastime. Until the mid-twentieth century, the beach had a wild appearance.

On 19 May 1947, planning permission was granted for the construction of a road along the ria de Pontevedra, between Pontevedra and Placeres. The works, which began in 1949 and were completed in 1955, completely altered the area by filling it with embankments, which also affected the beach, which was reduced in size. In 1969, the road was completed with four lanes of traffic and was inaugurated as a four-lane road on 8 August 1969.

On 28 June 2023, the State decommissioned the port beach, which was no longer required for port activities, and incorporated it into the general regime of the maritime-terrestrial public domain.

== Description ==
This is a virtually straight, flat beach in a semi-urban setting. It is a coastal beach of fine white sand facing the ria de Pontevedra. It is oriented to the north-west.

Situated close to the PO-11 four-lane motorway, this beach with its calm waters offers a view of the ria and the Tambo Island. It has showers and a drinks stand.

== See also ==
=== Bibliography ===
- Fortes Bouzán, Xosé (2011). Pontevedra. Burgo, villa, capital (in Spanish). Brión (A Coruña): Giverny. p. 434; 473. ISBN 978-84-939449-1-9.

=== Related articles ===
- Ria de Pontevedra
- Lérez Beach
- Paseo Marítimo de Pontevedra

=== External links ===
- Placeres Beach on the website Spain info
- Placeres Beach on the website InSpain
