= Belvedere Park (Pontevedra) =

Park in Pontevedra (Spain)

Parque del Mirador
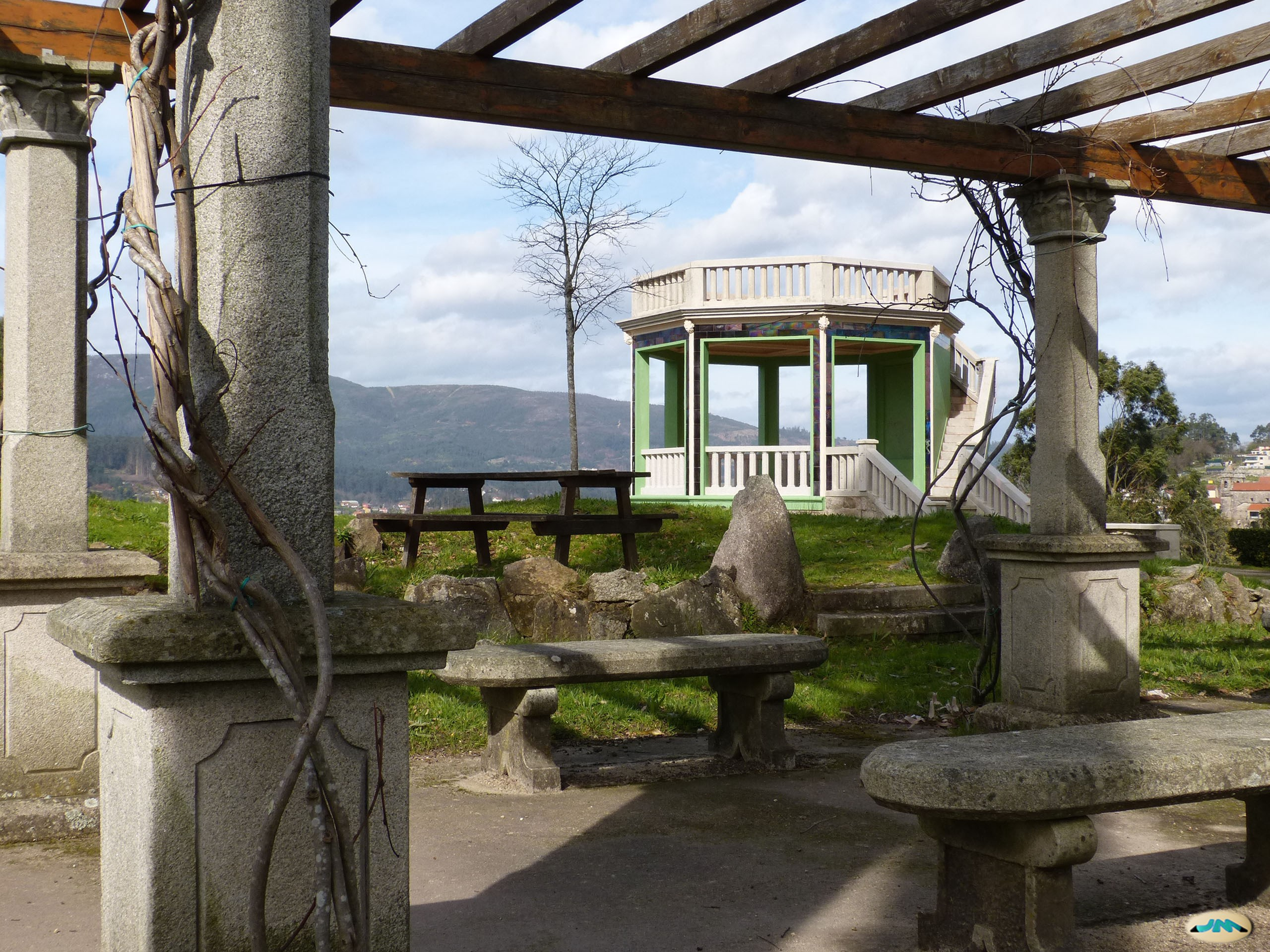
- Pergola and belvedere in the park
- Interactive map of Parque del Mirador
- Location: Pontevedra, Spain
- Coordinates: 42°26′39″N 08°37′44″W
- Area: 0.06 km^{2} (0.023 sq mi)
- Created: 1906
- Operator: Pontevedra City Council
- Status: Public park

Belvedere Park (Parque del Mirador in Spanish) is a public park in the Monte Porreiro neighbourhood of the Spanish city of Pontevedra.

== Location ==
The park is located at the western end of the Monte Porreiro neighbourhood of Pontevedra. It is bordered by Dinamarca and Francia streets and is very close to the UNED Associated Centre in the province of Pontevedra.

== History ==
The park was designed at the beginning of the 20th century as a private garden for the indiano (Spanish emigrant who left for Latin America and returned rich) Casimiro Gómez Cobas, who returned from Argentina and bought the grand old estate called Tenencia de San Antonio Abad in 1900, put up for public auction at the end of the 19th century, and who renamed the property Villa Buenos Aires, in honour of his stay in the Argentinian capital, where he had made a large fortune.

Casimiro Gómez commissioned the Portuguese landscape gardener Jacinto de Matos, one of the most important Portuguese landscape gardeners of the first half of the 20th century, to design a garden to the west of his vast estate of Villa Buenos Aires. Jacinto de Matos, who owned a nursery in Porto, devoted himself to designing gardens, including several in southern Galicia. The Portuguese landscape gardener designed a garden with a central path flanked by two rows of trees. By 1908, the park had already been laid out and, at the end of the central avenue, there was a small circular belvedere with an iron metal structure crowned by a dome, reached by six stone steps and designed as a viewpoint on a promontory overlooking the surrounding landscape and the Lérez river.

After the First World War Casimiro Gómez oriented the activity of the Villa Buenos Aires estate towards an experimental farm that also acted as a nursery for selected pine and eucalyptus seeds. On either side of the central avenue of the park designed by Jacinto de Matos, two double rows of large exotic eucalyptus trees were planted. The trees came from the Areas nursery in the municipality of Tui, set up in 1906 by forestry engineer Rafael Areses Vidal. Decades later, with the disappearance of the Villa Buenos Aires estate and the urban development of the Monte Porreiro neighbourhood in the 1970s, the belvedere overlooking the Lérez river was completely transformed, replacing the metal structure with a concrete one, and the park became a public space.

At the end of 2000, the belvedere was restored by students from the Monte Porreiro workshop-school, and three rest areas with stone benches and paths were created to link the belvedere to Dinamarca Street. Between 2006 and 2007, the park surrounding the belvedere was redesigned by these students, with benches, pavements, information panels and litter bins, and a children's play area and mini-golf course were created. The natural area surrounding the central pathway has also been improved, with the creation of paths, the integration of parking spaces and the creation of a fruit tree orchard.

In 2008, the belvedere was highlighted as a unique feature thanks to new ornamental lighting. The belvedere was illuminated with an intense white light, enhancing the view of the site from different points in the city.

In 2010, stone walls were built to support the land, a new path was created that crosses the entire park, shrubs were planted, a BMX track was created and sports pitches with baskets and goals were installed in the lower part of the park.

== Description ==
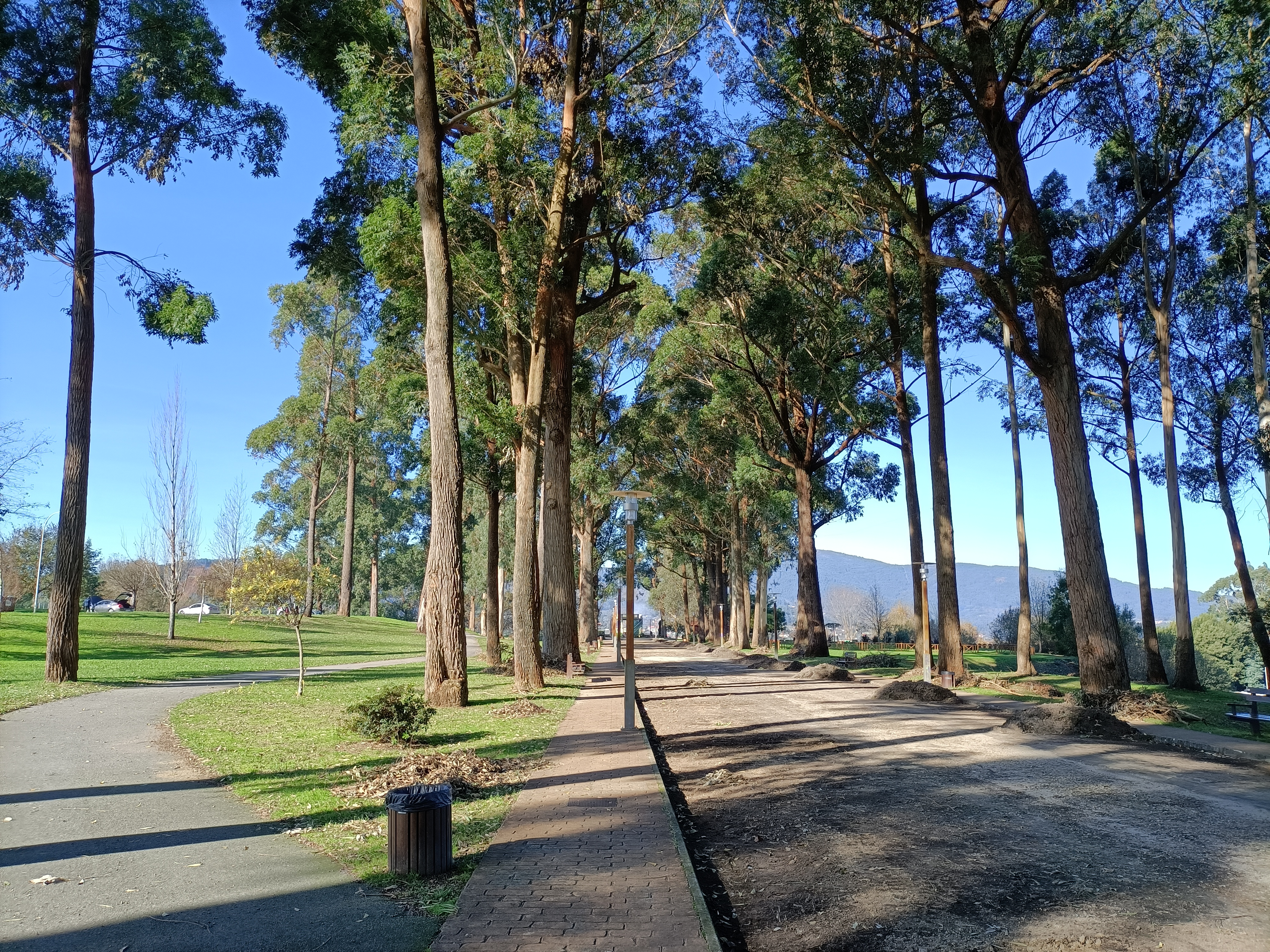
The park's central avenue in 2023, with its exotic eucalyptus trees.

The park, which is almost entirely bounded by Dinamarca street along its entire perimeter and Francia street to the east, covers an area of 60,000 m^{2} and comprises a central walkway that begins in Francia street and continues from Italia street. Scattered throughout the park and around the central walkway are around a hundred exotic eucalyptus trees with thick trunks at the base and broad leafy tops. These eucalyptus trees, arranged on both sides of the central avenue corresponding to the original design of the garden, form a double alignment, and include species of manna gum, rose gum, blue gum and bangalay.

The central avenue of the Belvedere park is lit by around twenty lampposts that provide access to the belvedere at the end of the avenue, which offers a good view of the last stretch of the Lérez river. The current belvedere is an octagonal structure that retains the original stone steps and has an upper terrace with balustrade accessed by an outside staircase on the right-hand side. On the north-west side of the park there is an 18-hole mini-golf course and a children's play area.

Near the belvedere is a pergola supported by six granite columns, which houses an area with four stone benches. Near Dinamarca Street, which surrounds the lower part of the belvedere park, there are two sports fields with baskets and goals.

The park is the meeting place par excellence in the Monte Porreiro neighbourhood and is also frequented by the rest of the population of Pontevedra.

== Gallery ==
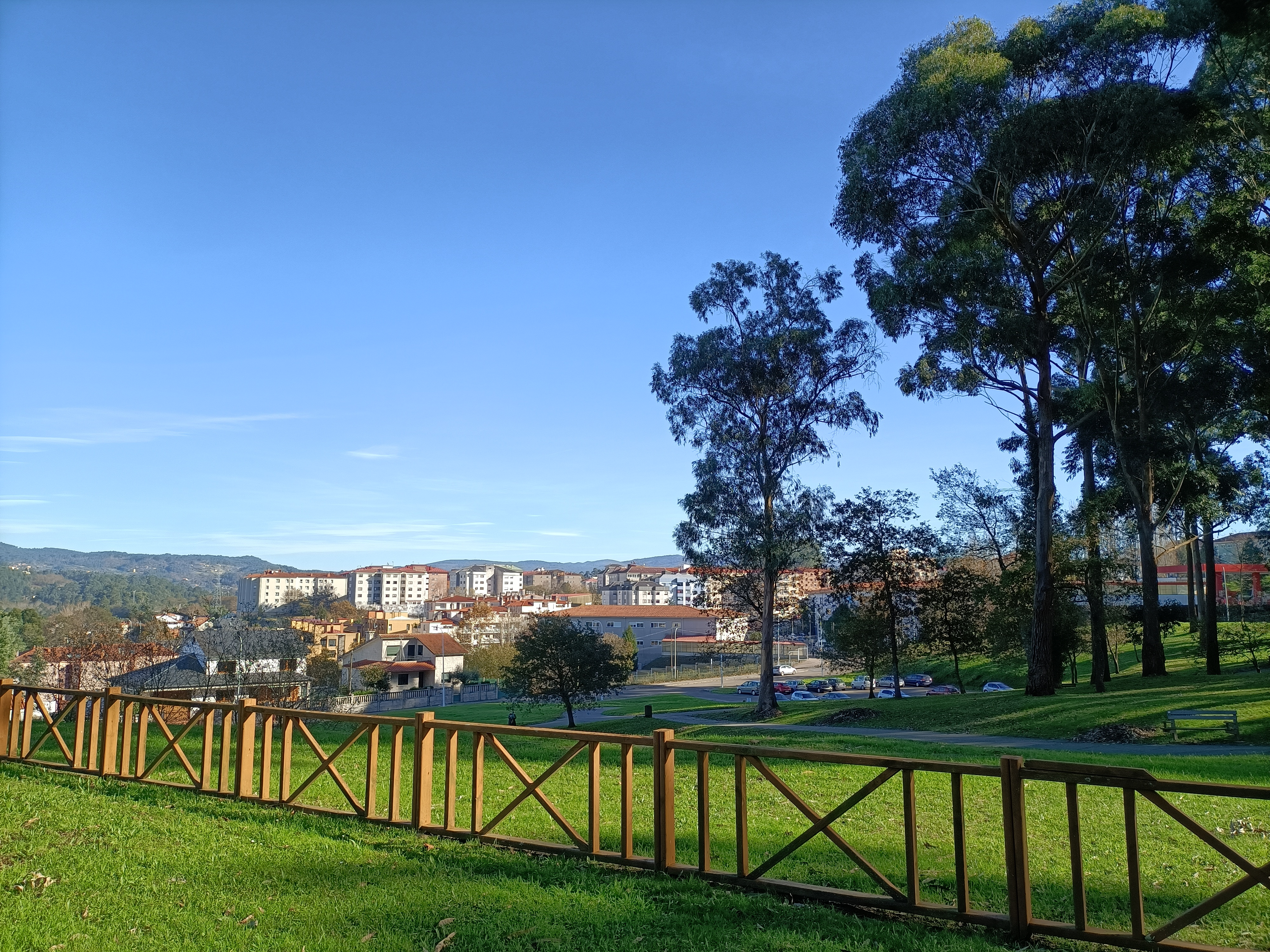
Scattered eucalyptus trees in the north-west of the park

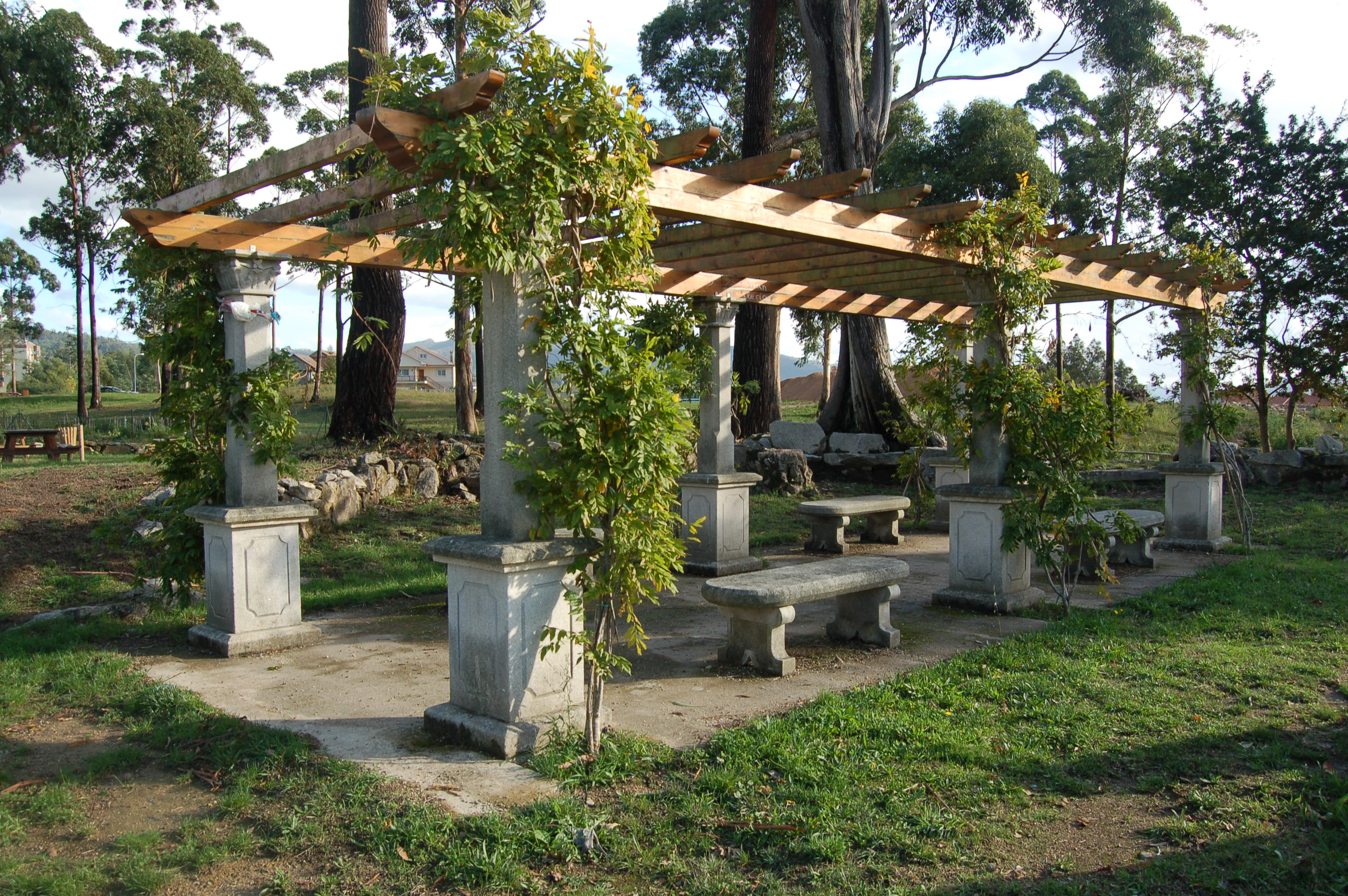
Pergola and benches

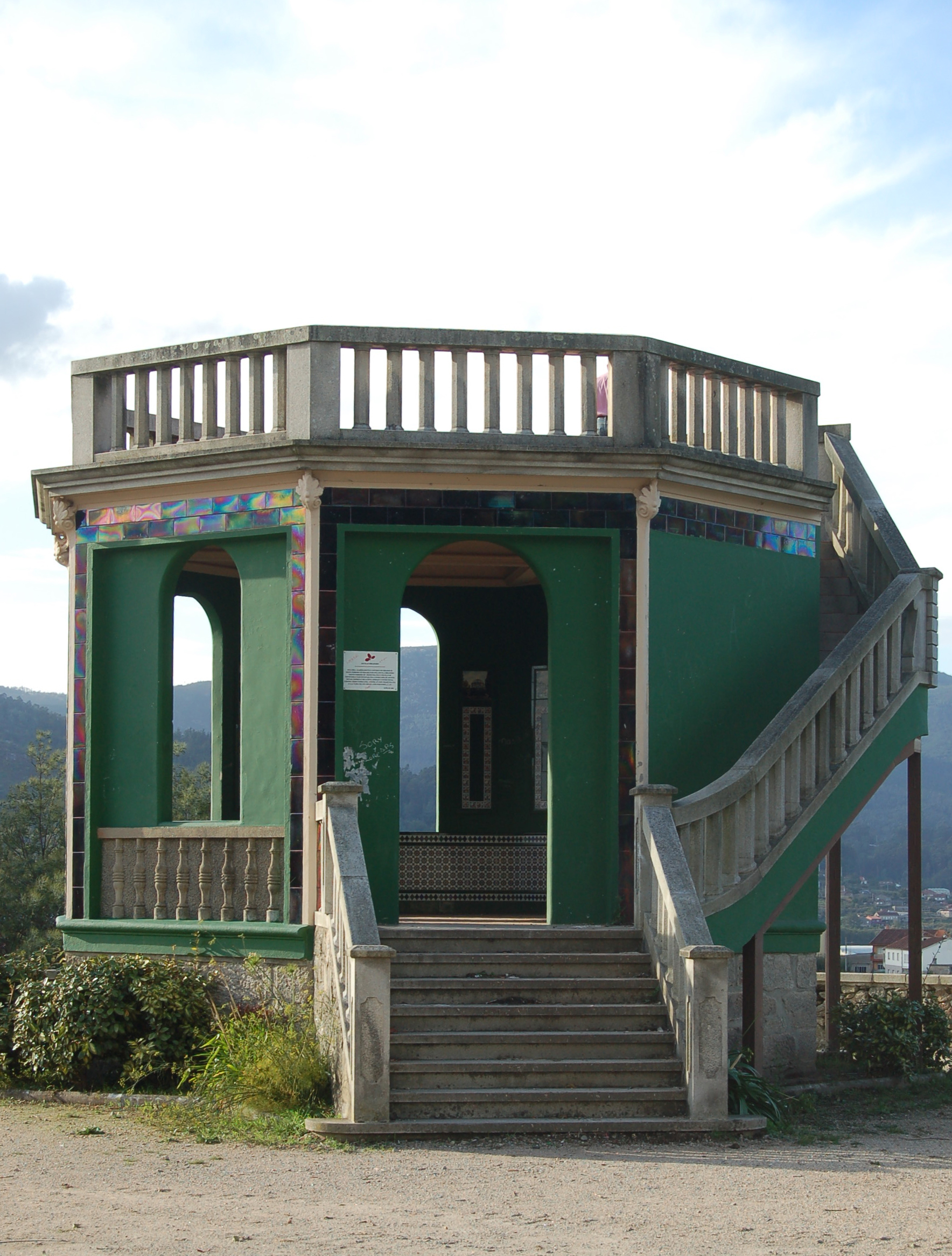
Belvedere at the end of the central avenue

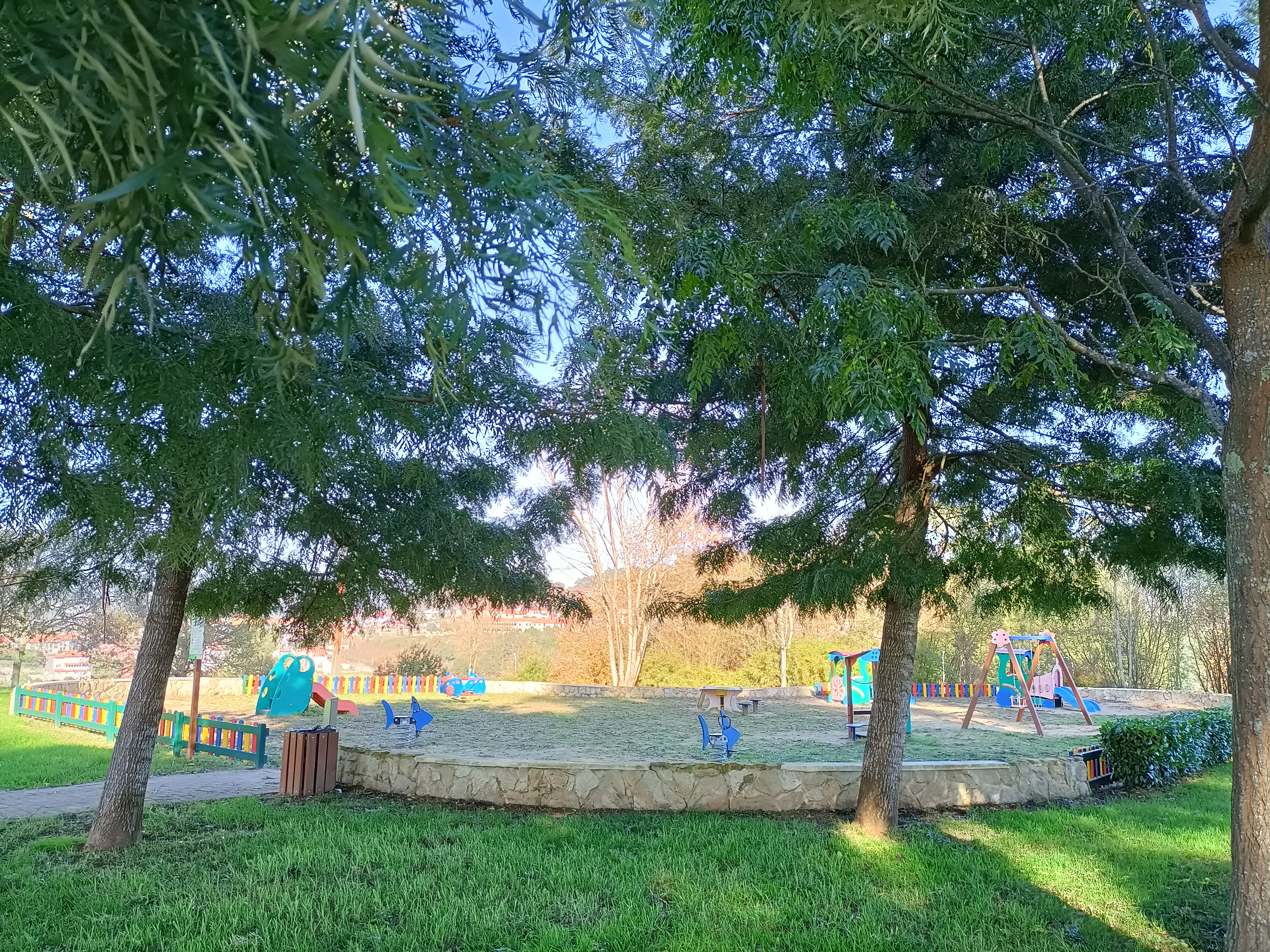
Children's playground

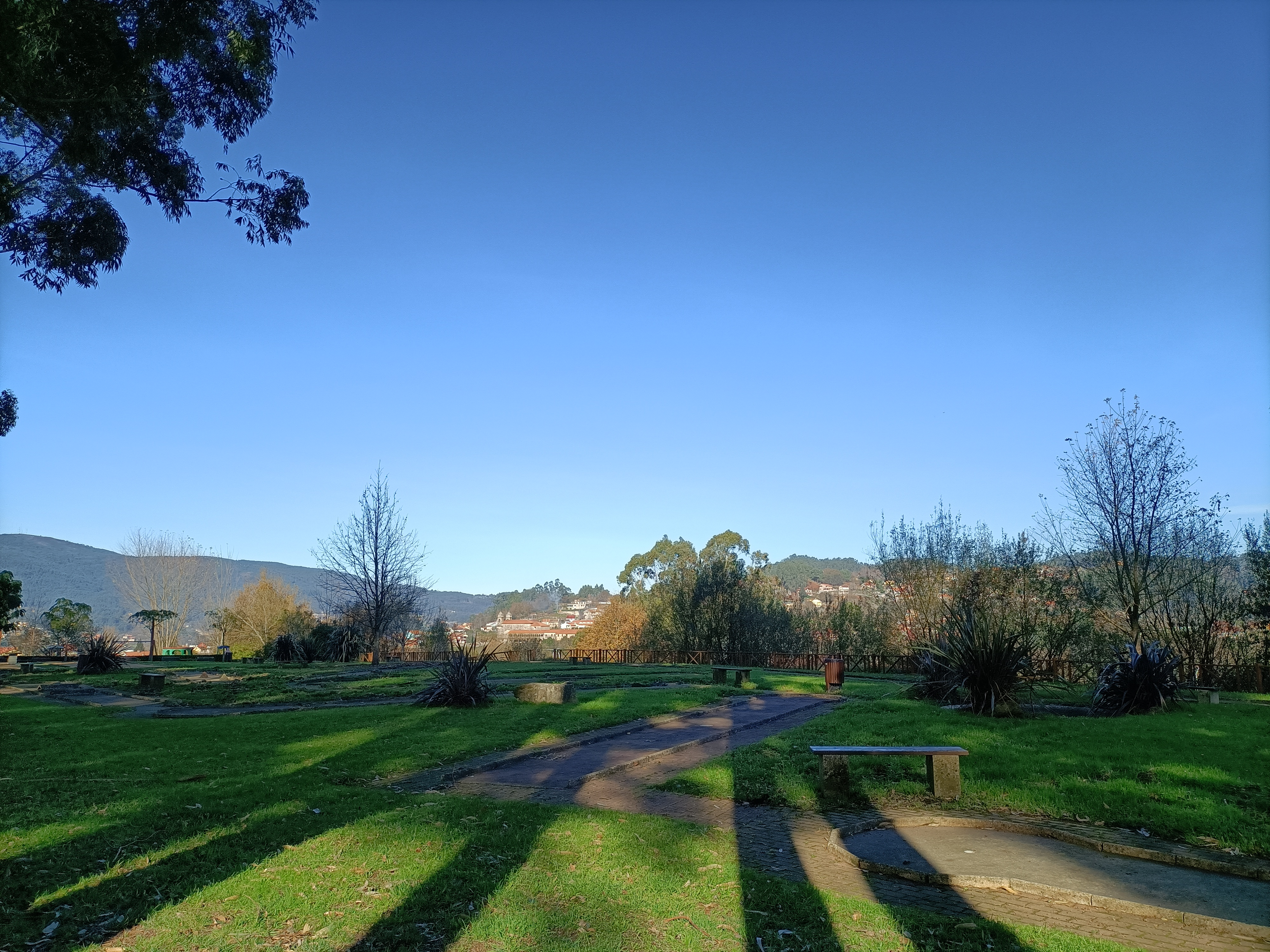
Miniature golf

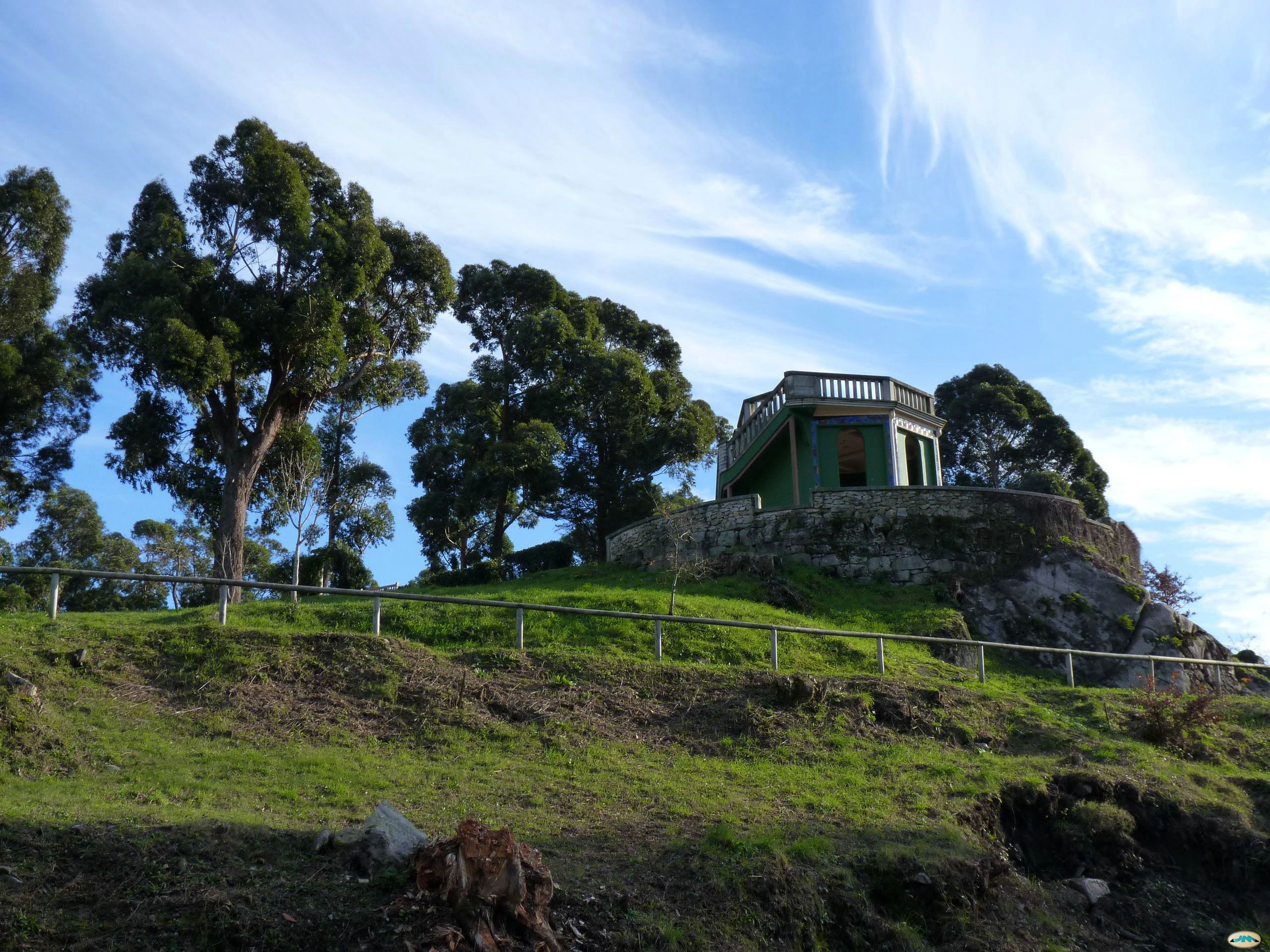
The belvedere at the top of a promontory

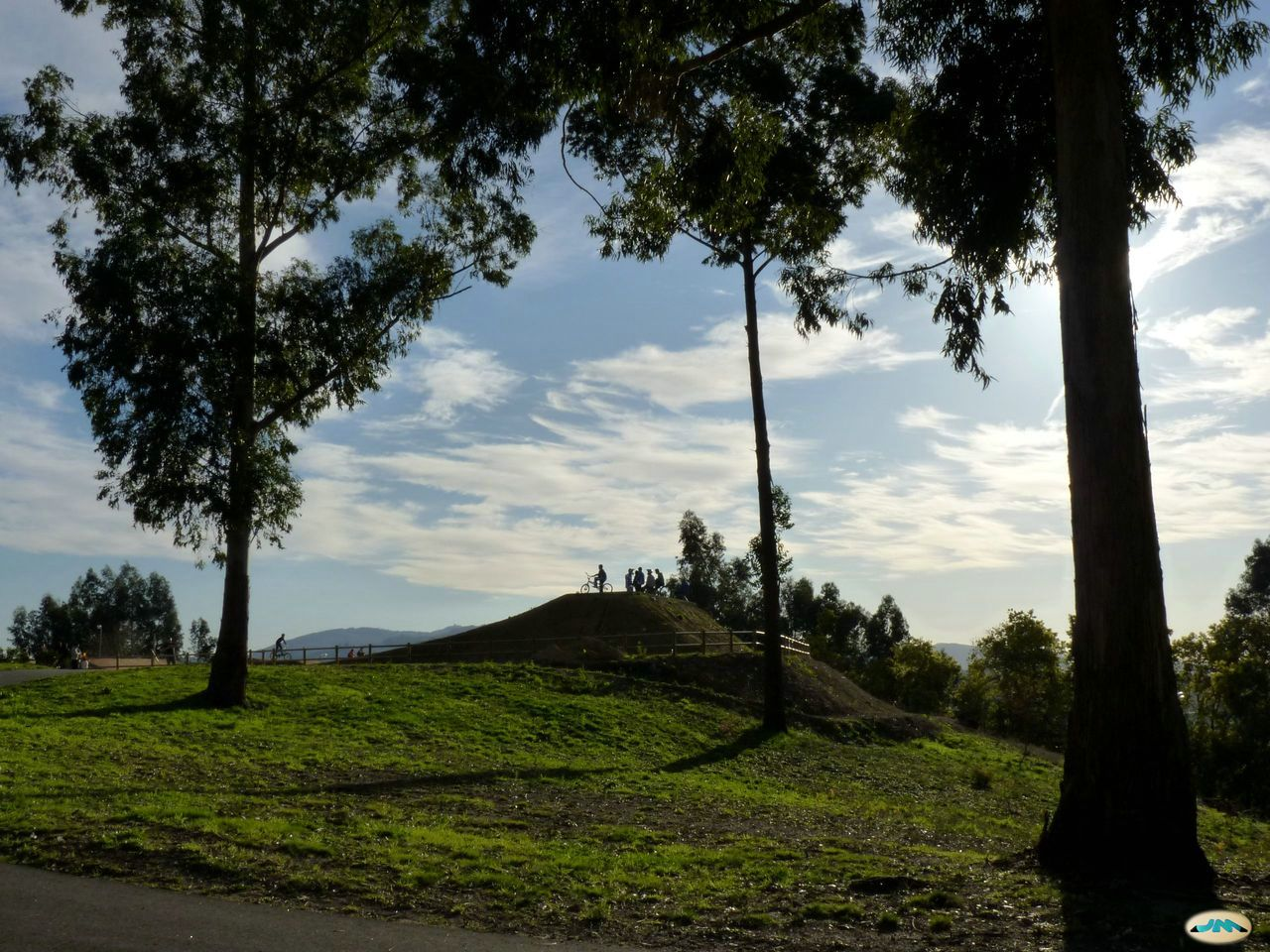
Gymkhana trail

== See also ==
=== Bibliography ===
- Álvarez Álvarez, Pedro; Rico Boquete, Eduardo; Rodríguez Soalleiro, Roque (2003). "La creación de los primeros viveros forestales públicos en Galicia". Cuadernos de la Sociedad Española de Ciencias Forestales (in Spanish) (16): 261–266. ISSN 1575-2410.
- Carmona Badía, Xoán (2009). Empresarios de Galicia. Volume 2 (in Galician). A Coruña: CIEF, Centro de Investigación Económica e Financeira Fundación Caixa Galicia. p. 299. ISBN 978-84-96982-37-6.
- Pereira Fernández, Xosé Manuel (2009). El balneario del Lérez. La aventura termal de Casimiro Gómez (in Spanish). Pontevedra: Diputación de Pontevedra. p. 76-78. ISBN 978-84-8457-335-7.
- Riveiro Tobío, Elvira (2008). Descubrir Pontevedra (in Spanish). Pontevedra: Edicións do Cumio. p. 74. ISBN 9788482890852.

=== Related articles ===
- Monte Porreiro
- Botanical Garden of Lourizán
- Palm Trees Park
- Island of Sculptures

=== External links ===
- Remarkable trees in Pontevedra on the Pontevedra Provincial Council's natural environment website
- Preliminary project for the redevelopment of the Monte Porreiro district (page 8) on the IGVS website of the Galician regional government.
