= Lérez Beach =

Beach in Pontevedra, Spain

- Beach
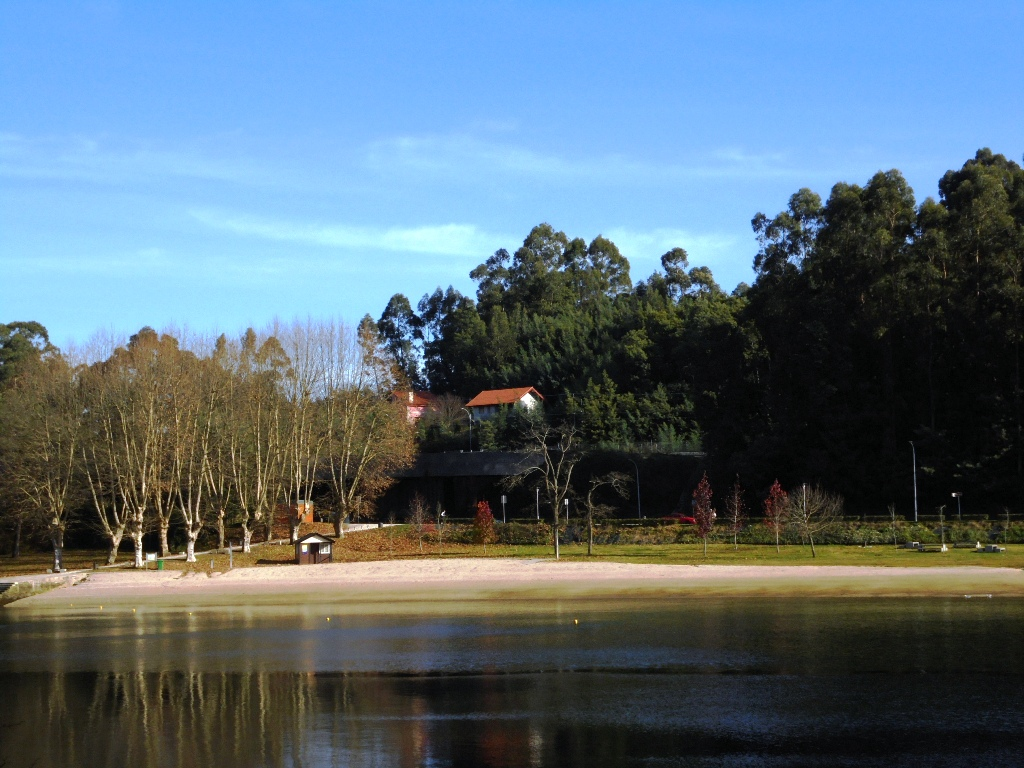
- Lérez beach, Pontevedra

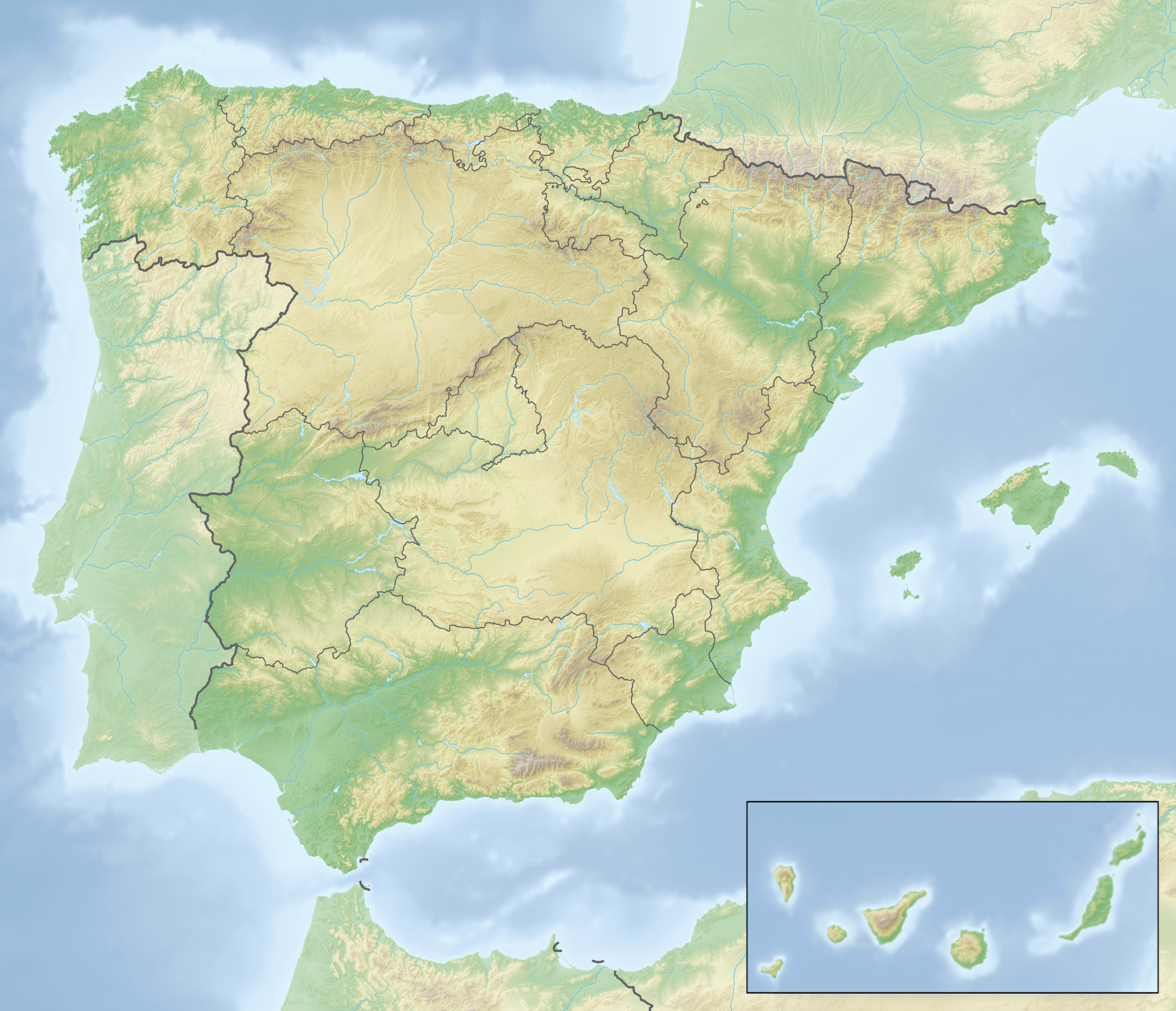
- Coordinates: 42°26′40″N 8°37′59″W
- Location: Pontevedra

Dimensions
  - Length: 100 metres (330 ft)
  - Width: 20 metres (66 ft)

The Lérez beach is a Galician beach located in the municipality of Pontevedra in the province of Pontevedra, Spain. It is a semi-urban river beach with a length of 100 metres.

== Location and access ==
The beach is located on the left bank of the Lérez River, about 3 kilometres from its mouth in the Pontevedra ria, 2 kilometres from the city centre and less than a kilometre from the Monte Porreiro district. It is located opposite the Island of Sculptures park and is very close to the old railway bridge. This is where the traditional country meals of the romería of San Benedict of Lérez are held, where it is typical to eat mussels.

It is easily accessible on foot from the city centre, along the banks of the Lérez River and from the Monte Porreiro district. It can also be reached by car. The Lérez hiking trail starts here and runs for several kilometres to Ponte Bora.

== Description ==
It is a straight beach, located in a semi-urban environment. It is a river beach with white sand. Around the beach there are 5000 square metres of grassy areas and a picnic area with stone tables and benches. There is also a small pier with stone steps over the river and a small playground. The whole area covers a total of 3 hectares.

It is an area of calm waters that benefits from a small dead end of the Lérez. The sea is close by, so it is subject to the rise and fall of the tides of the Pontevedra ria. The Coastal Service has authorised its opening. The beach has toilets, showers, a lifeguard service, a first aid post, access for the disabled, a small car park, litter bins and a kiosk. Water quality is good. Swimming is watched over from the end of June to the end of August, from 12:30 to 20:30.

The beach was opened for swimming on 11 June 2009.

== Gallery ==
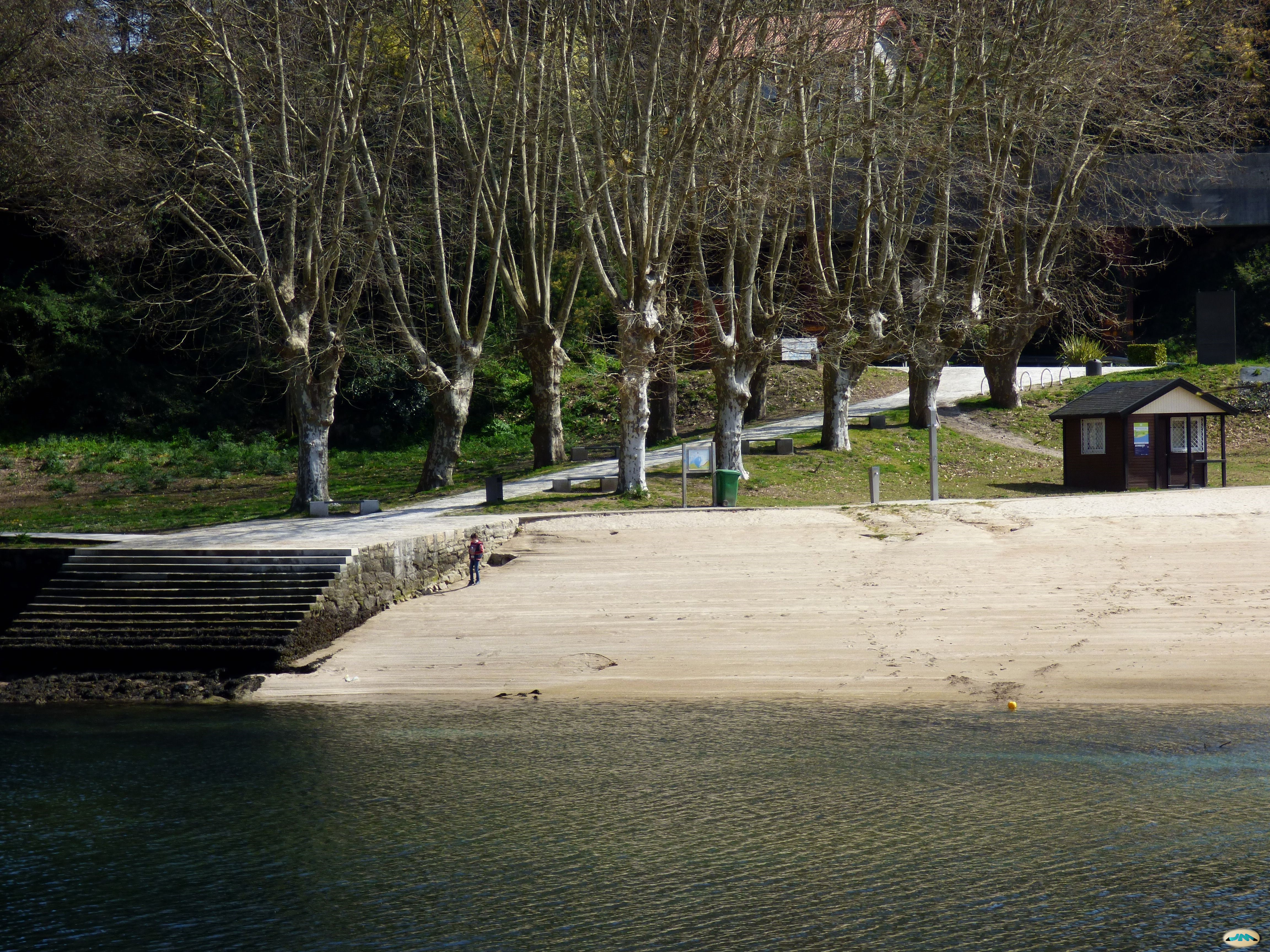

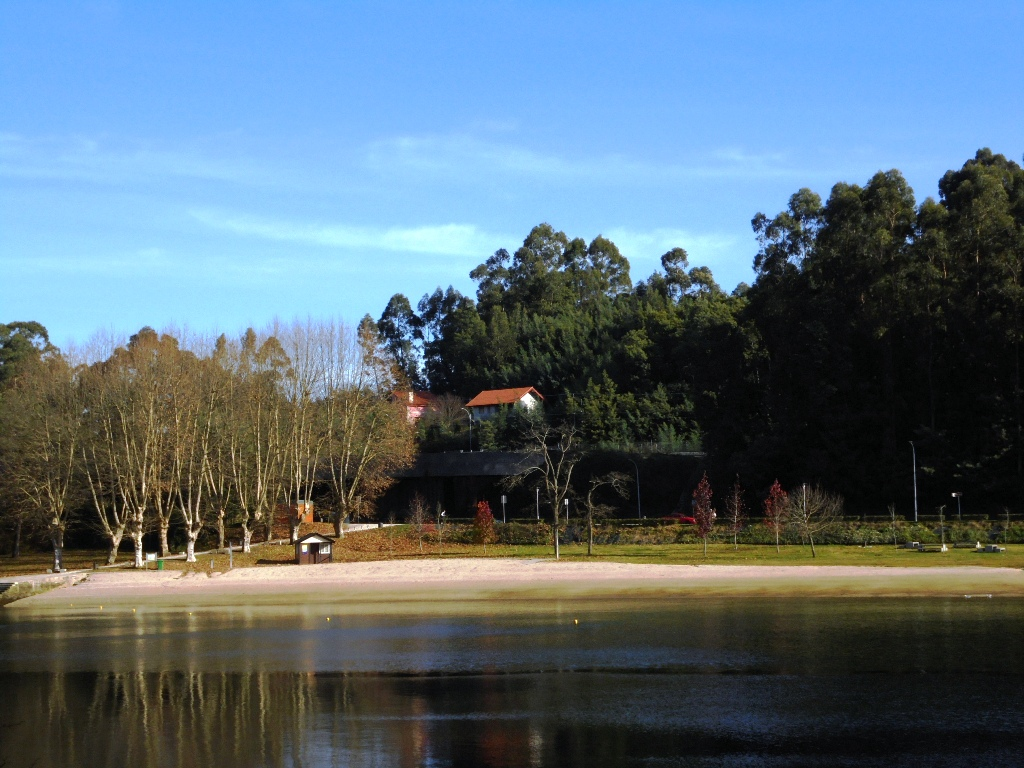

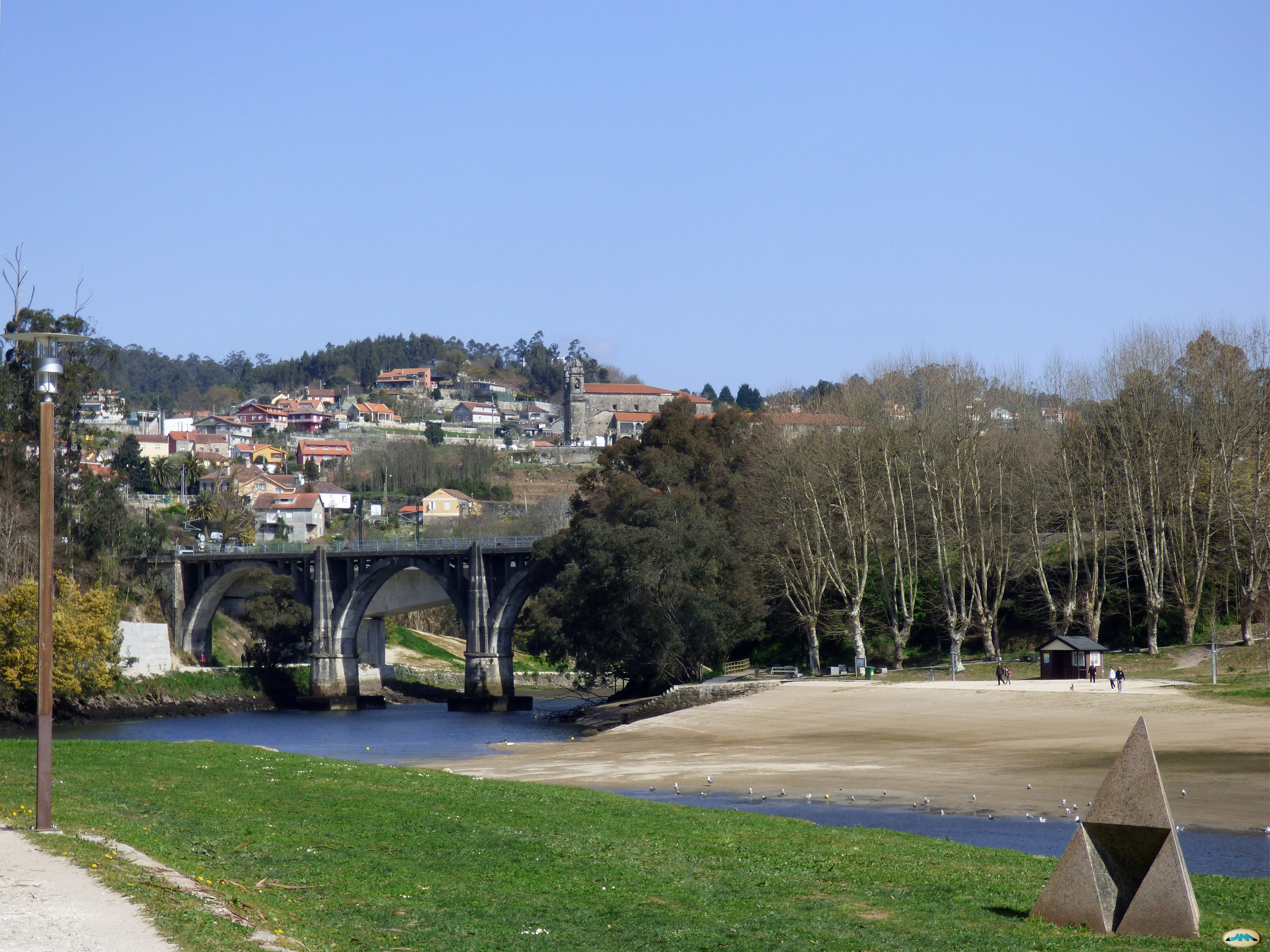

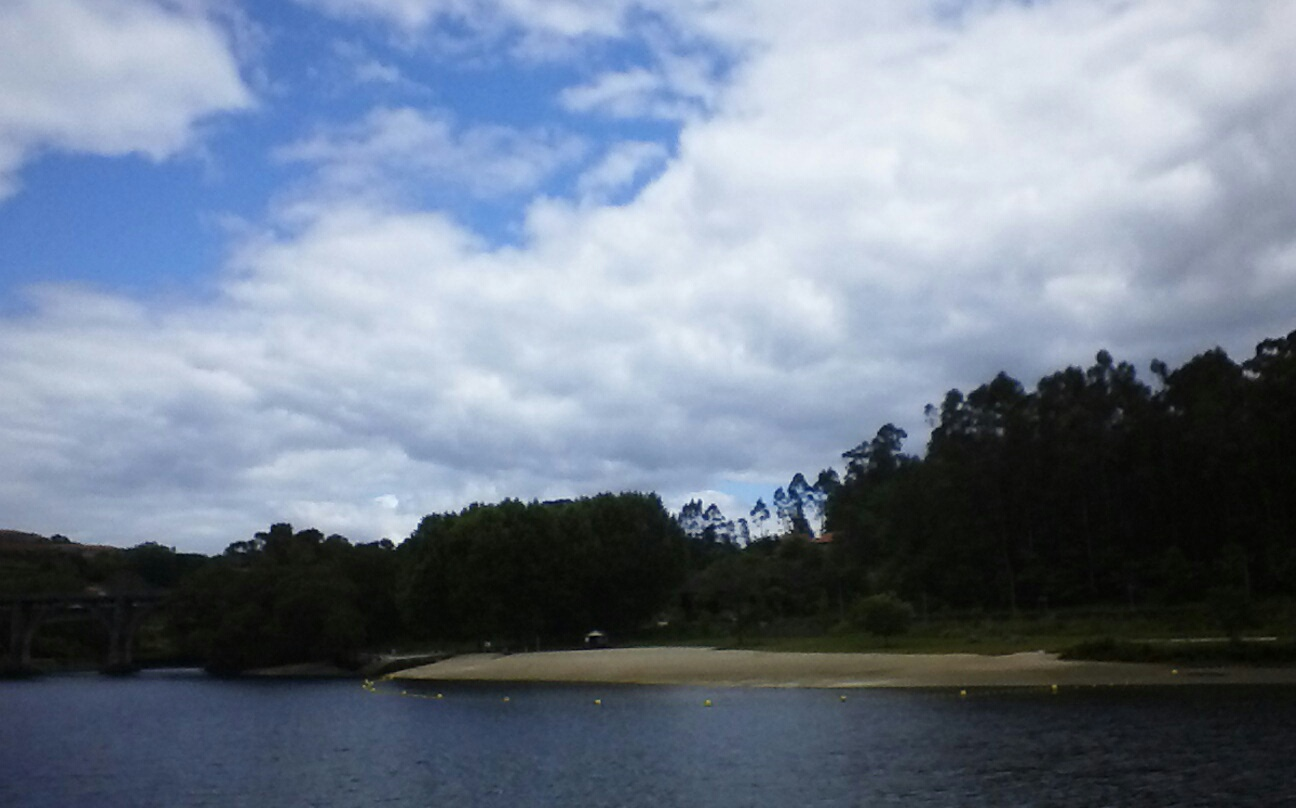

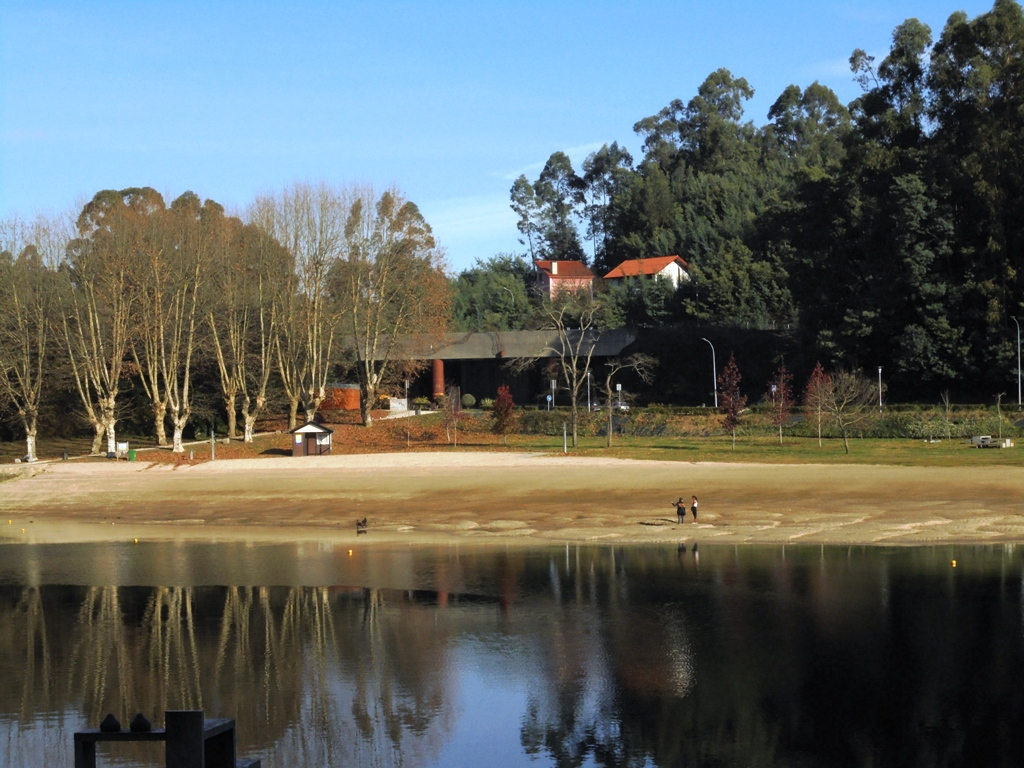

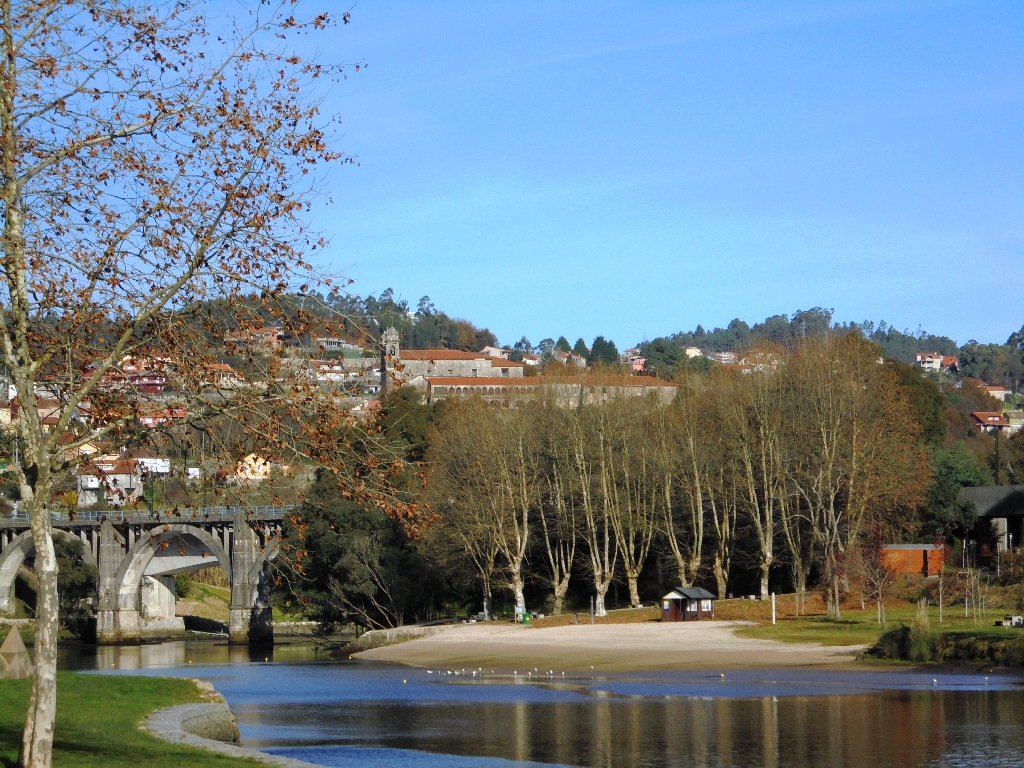

== See also ==
=== Bibliography ===
- Aganzo, Carlos (2010). Pontevedra. Ciudades con encanto (in Spanish). Madrid: El País-Aguilar. p. 109. ISBN 978-8403509344.

=== Related articles ===
- Ria de Pontevedra
- Placeres Beach
- Word Bridge
- Island of Sculptures

=== External links ===
- Lérez beach
- Playa del Lérez
- Playa del Lérez
