= Mosteiro Beneditino de San Bieito de Lérez =

Benedictine Monastery in Pontevedra, Spain

Coordinates: 42°26′57″N 8°37′56″W

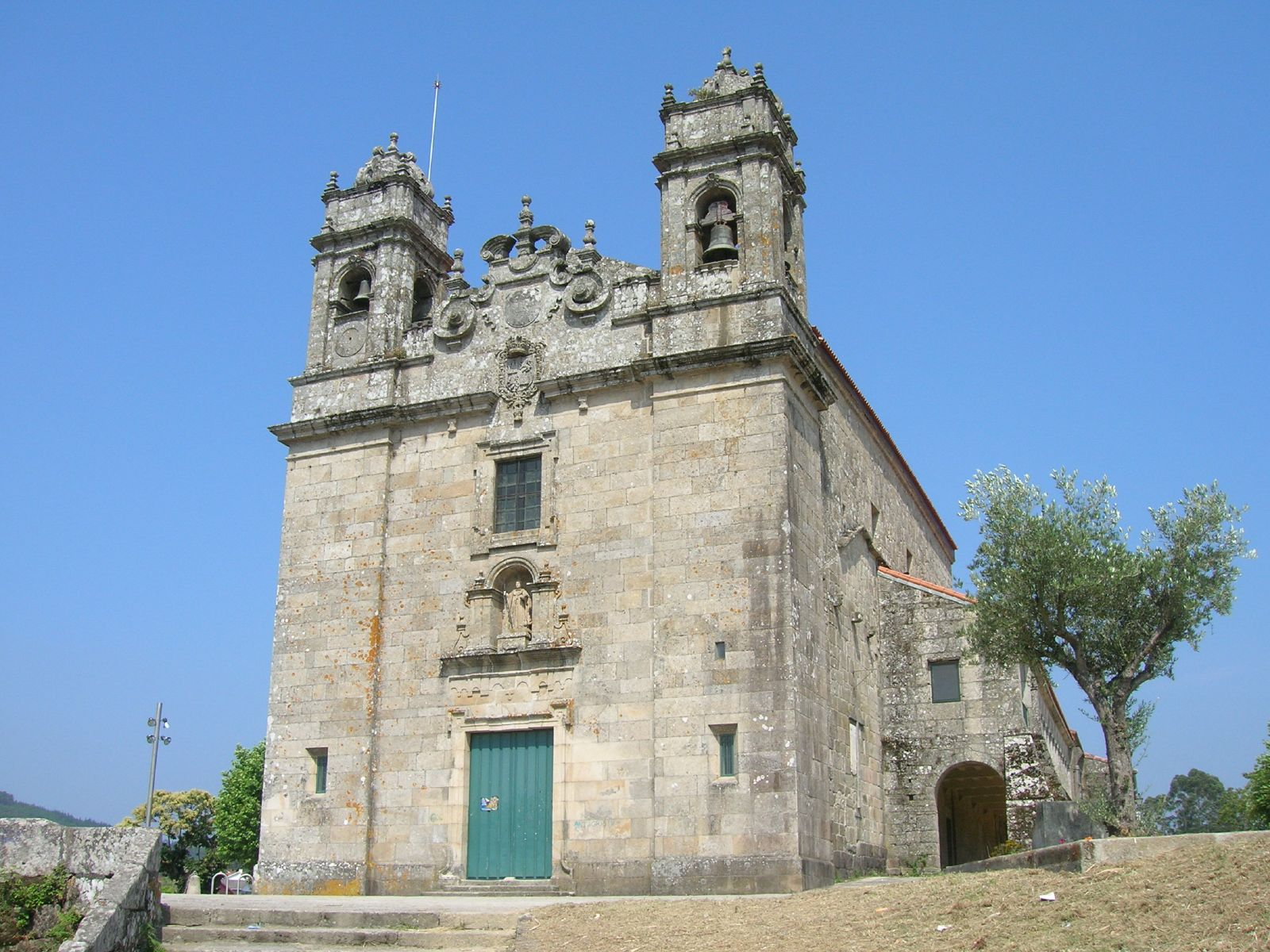

Mosteiro Beneditino de San Bieito de Lérez is a monastery in Pontevedra, Galicia, Spain.
