= Botanical Garden of Lourizán =

Botanical garden in Pontevedra (Spain)

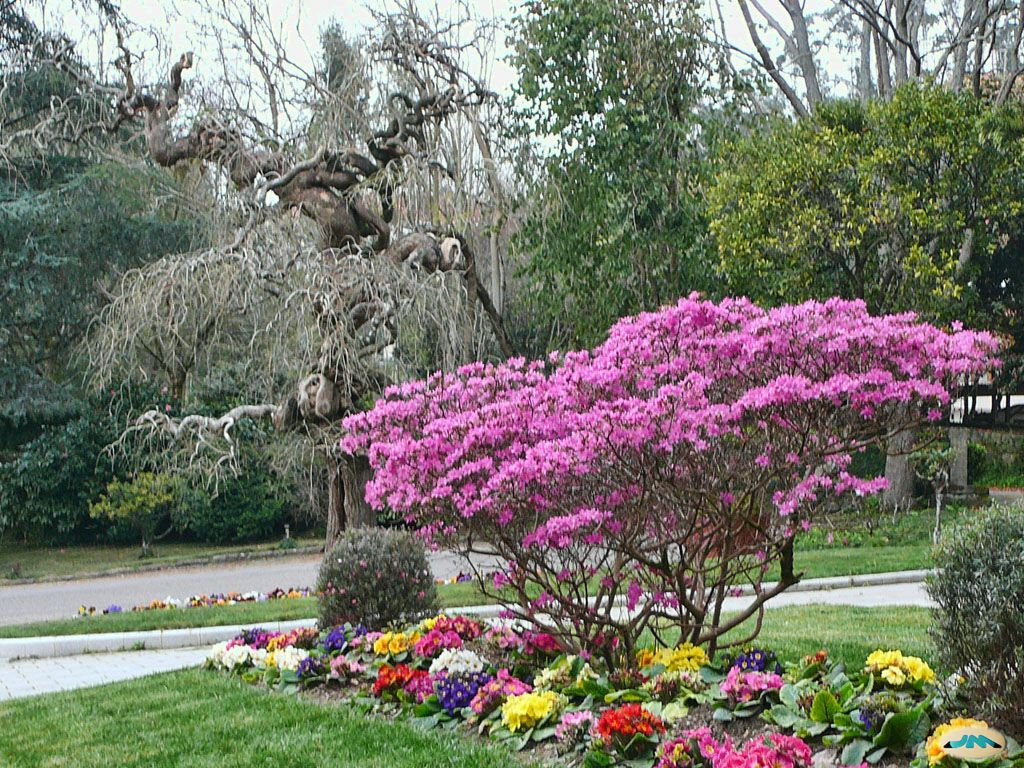
- Interactive map of Botanical Garden of Lourizán
- Location: Pontevedra, Spain
- Coordinates: 42°24′36″N 08°39′54″W
- Area: 54 hectares (130 acres)
- Created: 1949
- Owner: Xunta de Galicia
- Status: Botanical garden

The Botanical Garden of Lourizán is an arboretum located in the 54 hectares (130 acres) grounds of the Pazo de Lourizán in the municipality of Pontevedra, Spain. With more than 850 catalogued species it is one of the largest collections in the country, and the most important botanical garden in Galicia.

== Location ==
The Pazo de Lourizán is located on the northern slopes of the Morrazo massif, at the end of the Ria de Pontevedra, in the civil parish of Lourizán, in Pontevedra, Spain. The estate houses an arboretum in its 54 hectares (130 acres) ground.

== History ==
The origins of the property date back to the 15th century, when it was still a farm. The arboretum was created in 1949 with exotic and Galician species.

In the 19th century, the estate was acquired by the politician Eugenio Montero Ríos, who built the current manor house as his summer residence and a meeting place for the most prominent Spanish figures of the time.

On 25 February 1943, by order of the Ministry of Education, the Lourizán estate was created, donated for this purpose by the Provincial Deputation of Pontevedra. The study of fast-growing forest species was started there, with the aim of satisfying the Spanish needs for wood in those years.

The estate was the place of practice for the students of the Madrid School of Forestry Engineers until it became part of the Xunta de Galicia. The regional government created the Lourizán Forest and Environment Research Centre in its facilities.

== Description ==
In this botanical garden, there are 700 different species and more than 1900 trees from all over the world, many of which are of great size. Among them, a cedar of Lebanon over 130 years old and the oldest metasequoia in the Iberian Peninsula and one of the tallest in Europe, which has been in Lourizán since 1951.

Since 1993, the Parque das Autonomías has been located inside the park, with almost 50 species of flora representative of the different autonomous communities of Spain. There are also areas dedicated to the flora of Taiwan and Australia, as well as the Eucaliptetetum and Coniferetum, with more than 85 and 170 different species respectively.

Many native trees grow on the estate, such as oaks, chestnuts and birches, sycamores and introduced and exotic trees, such as cypresses, araucarias, cedars, magnolias or common privet, many of which were brought in by French gardeners. Several of these trees are included in the Catalogue of Singular Trees of the Galician Government. There are arboretums with all varieties of chestnut trees, pines, eucalyptus or camellias, with the tallest specimen in the world, a 20.5 metres (67 ft) tall Japanese camellia. There is also a rimu from New Zealand and a small Taiwanese garden.

In the park there is an important collection of Camellias. It is believed that old specimens of camellias from Lourizán belonged to the Portuguese horticultural establishment of José Marques Loureiro in the 19th century. Most of the Merino herbarium is also located in the arboretum.

== Activities of the research centre ==
- Genetic improvement.
- Introduction of tree species.

== See also ==
- Belvedere Park
- Marismas de Alba Natural Park
- Island of Sculptures
- Alameda de Pontevedra
- Palm Trees Park

== Bibliography ==
- Aganzo, Carlos (2010). Pontevedra. Ciudades con encanto (in Spanish). Madrid: El País-Aguilar. pp. 114–115. ISBN 978-8403509344.
- Riveiro Tobío, Elvira (2008). Descubrir Pontevedra (in Spanish). Pontevedra: Edicións do Cumio. pp. 86–87. ISBN 9788482890852.
