= Pazo de Lourizán =

Art Nouveau Building in Pontevedra, Spain

Lourizán Palace
- Pazo de Lourizán
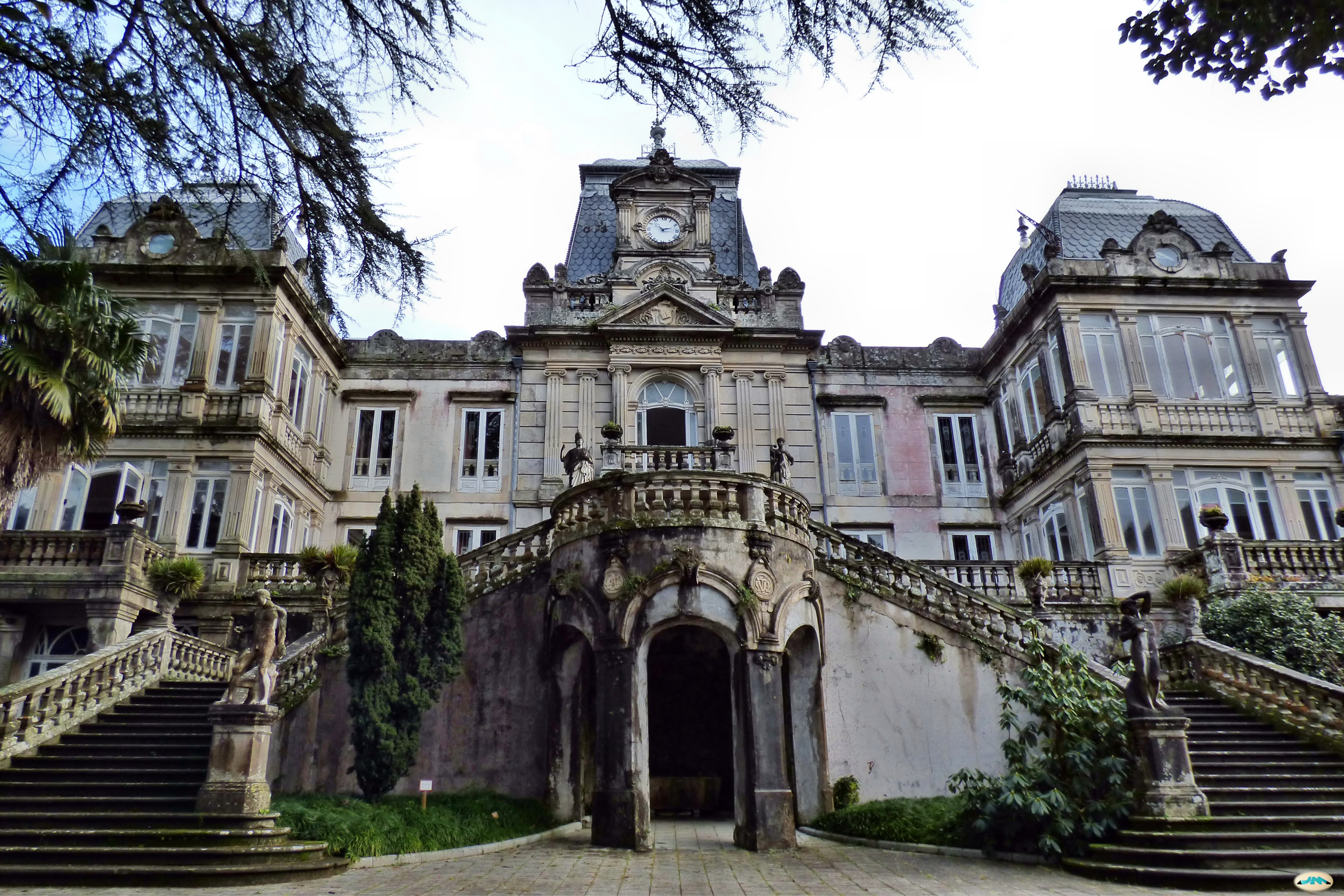
- Interactive map of the Lourizán Palace area

General information
- Type: Pazo
- Location: Pontevedra, Spain
- Coordinates: 42°24′34″N 8°39′53″W
- Construction started: 19th century; 1909
- Completed: 1912
- Owner: Xunta de Galicia

Technical details
- Floor count: 3
- Grounds: 54 hectares (130 acres)

Design and construction
- Architect: Jenaro de la Fuente Domínguez

Website
- Official website

The Palace of Lourizán is a pazo with a park that houses a botanical garden. The 54 hectares (130 acres) estate is located in Herbalonga, in the civil parish of Lourizán, in Pontevedra, Spain. The property, owned by the Xunta de Galicia since 2023, houses a Center for Environmental and Forestry Research and the associated higher school since the 1940s.

== History ==
In the 15th century this property was transformed into a farm and belonged to the Montenegro family. The circular crenellated dovecote dates from this period. A fortified tower-house was built on the estate, where Luis de Góngora spent some time in 1609 and wrote part of his book Soledades.

In the 17th century, the estate, known as Granja de la Sierra, was owned by the Marquisate of La Sierra. Later it had different owners, merchants and businessmen. In the 19th century, the palace belonged to Buenaventura Marcó del Pont Bori, after he bought it from the heirs of Francisco Genaro Ángel, his wife's brother.

Later it was converted into a main residence and a summer cottage when Eugenio Montero Ríos lived there. In October 1876 he rented the estate and acquired it on 16 May 1879. At that time the estate reached the banks of the Ria de Pontevedra and had its own pier. Between 1893 and 1894, the first major refurbishment of the manor house was carried out. It consisted of creating a wooden gallery in the south wing, which enclosed the building's chapel. The pazo became an ostentatious residence with representative institutional functions, as well as a living, leisure and recreational space. The Treaty of Paris was signed in its rooms after the war with the United States in 1898, in which Spain lost Cuba, Puerto Rico, the Philippines, and Guam.

Eugenio Montero Ríos commissioned the architect Jenaro de la Fuente Domínguez to completely renovate the palace in the early 20th century. The aim was to turn the pazo into a large residential palace, imitating and surpassing in size the typology of the hôtels particuliers in the fashion of the French Second Empire style. The project's façade plan dates from 20 February 1909 and it integrated and harmonised elements from different stages of construction to create an architectural unity. The refurbishment gave the palace a new appearance, both on the outside and inside. Work began in September 1909 and was completed in 1912. Originally, the marble statues on the great central staircase leading to the palace formed the so-called avenue of statues, but with this major refurbishment of the pazo they were relocated to the staircase. Eugenio Montero Ríos lived in the Lourizán Palace until his death in 1914.

The Provincial Deputation of Pontevedra bought it in 1943 from the Provincial Savings Bank of Pontevedra and (a fifth) from the widowed Marquise of Alhucemas, daughter of Montero Ríos. That same year, the Provincial Deputation handed it over to the Ministry of Education to be used as a regional centre for teaching, research and forestry experiments, and in 1946 it became a higher technical school of forestry.

The centre became part of the National Agricultural Research Institute (INIA) in 1973 and in 1984 it was transferred to the Xunta de Galicia. It is currently integrated into the Centre for Sustainable Development of the Regional Environment Office since 1991. The main objectives of the Environmental and Forestry Research Centre of Lourizán are the protection, conservation and improvement of Galicia's forestry heritage.

On 19 May 2023, the estate became the property of the Xunta de Galicia.

== Description ==
=== The building ===
The present manor house has a romantic air and is the work of Jenaro de la Fuente Domínguez. It is an eclectic building with influences from Art Nouveau, Classicism and the French architecture of the Second Empire.

The structure of the palace is symmetrical, monumental and with a predominance of horizontal volumes. It has a ground floor and two upper floors. The central body is U-shaped with three towers crowned by French mansards and slate roof. The facade has Ionic columns and pilasters. The central part is enhanced by a coat of arms and a clock, in the place where the coats of arms of Galician manor houses are usually found.

In front of this central body, advanced in relation to the sides, is a large two-flight imperial stone staircase, surrounded by neoclassical white marble statues personifying justice and prudence and representing virtues, values and devotions. At the top of the staircase are the statues of Germanicus, Discobolus, the Dying Slave and Sophocles, while at the ends of the rotunda are the statues of Pallas Athena and Diana of Gabii. In the pavilions on the main façade, next to the entrance door to the vestibule, the allegories of Spring and Summer can be seen. The round staircase generates a belvedere from which to contemplate the views in imitation of the French baroque style. This staircase leads to the main entrance and to a semicircular terrace (which serves as a viewpoint) above an artificial grotto that simulates a volcanic limestone cave called the Grotto of Mirrors. At this point, two side wings open up, consisting of light long galleries of stone and glass that envelop the old pazo. On the first floor, the facades of the side wings give way to the central body and create terraces with balustrades. In these lateral sections, the high windows, pilasters, balconies, dormers and domes lined with zinc scales of the dôme à l'impériale type are repeated, which reinforce the elegance of the palace.

The large number of windows and balconies stand out, bringing light and lightness to the structure. The decoration is remarkable for the fusion of neoclassical and Art Nouveau elements. The columns, balconies and ornaments show classical resources. The triangular pediment of the central body is decorated with the symbols of the profession of Eugenio Montero Ríos, and the attributes of justice, a shield with a book and a feather.

The interior is accessed through a simple door with the initials on the glass of its former owners, "E and A", "Eugenio and Avelina".

The interior of the palace is organised around the three floors visible from the outside, where the ground floor and the first floor contain the remains of the walls of the first house and pazo. The rooms are distributed according to two halves separated by a long corridor that runs along the entire length of the building, as in palatial architecture, leaving the rooms of higher rank, the rooms for receiving visitors, lounges and offices, towards the front facade facing the park, and the accessory parts such as servants' quarters, kitchen and pantries towards the rear facing the farmyard.

=== The estate ===
The estate has 54 hectares (130 acres) of gardens and groves, which show the different uses to which it has been put over the centuries: farm, seigneurial botanical garden, and forestry research centre. It has one of the most important tree groves in Europe, with plant species brought from other latitudes or even singular modifications of species to adapt them to the climate of Pontevedra, resulting in a unique forest ensemble.

Many native trees grow here, such as oaks, chestnuts and Birches, sycamores and introduced and exotic trees, such as Cypresses, Araucarias, cedars, magnolias or common privet, many of which were brought by French gardeners. Several of these trees are included in the Catalogue of Singular Trees of the Galician Government. There are arboretums with all varieties of chestnut trees, pines, eucalyptus or camellias, with the tallest specimen in the world, a 20.5 metres (67 ft) tall Japanese camellia. There is also a rimu from New Zealand and a small Taiwanese garden.

Around the palace there are ponds, granaries on stilts, a 15th-century dovecote, a glass greenhouse with an iron structure from 1900, a one-piece granite table (apparently extracted from a rock on the Tambo Island), white marble statues and several fountains, such as that of the Shell, that of the Three Channels, that of the Patio and that of the Cave of Mirrors. The estate is organised into avenues: the Camellia Avenue, the Eucalyptus Avenue and the Cave of Mirrors Avenue.

The art nouveau greenhouse from the early 20th century is made of glass and wrought iron and the Galician attic with its threshing floor and dryer has 16 feet. The greenhouse is notable for its large, light structure with a rectangular ground plan. Its highest point is 7 metres (23 ft) in the central space, where the larger species are cultivated, leaving the side spaces for smaller plants.

== Culture ==
Writer Lola Fernández Pazos published in 2022 the novel El Pazo de Lourizán, which is set in the palace.

Tambo Island was once part of the palace's property. Montero Ríos bought three fifths of the island in 1884 and another fifth in 1894. In 1940, his children sold it to the Spanish Navy for use by the Naval Military Academy.

== Gallery ==
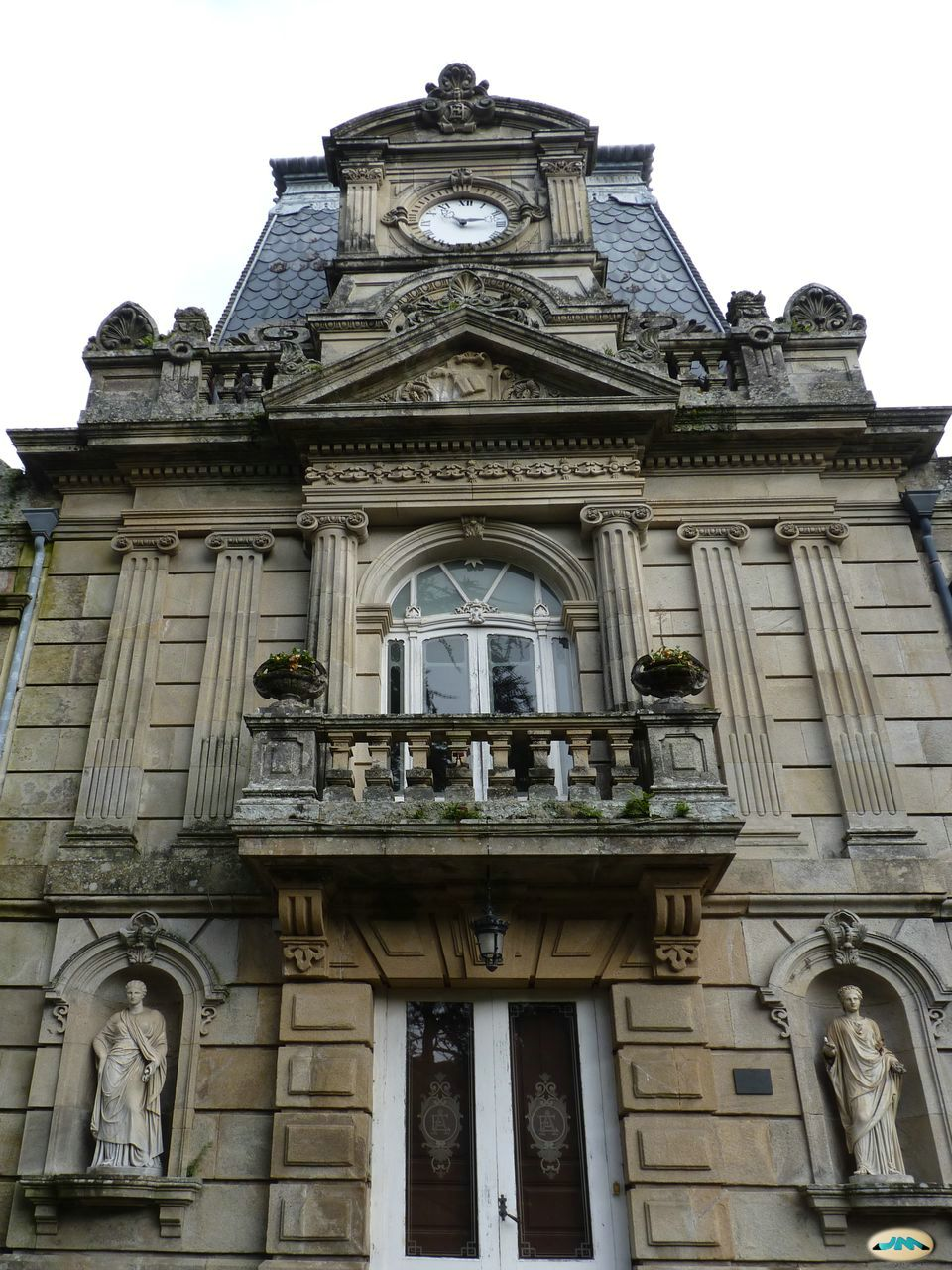
Détail of the façade

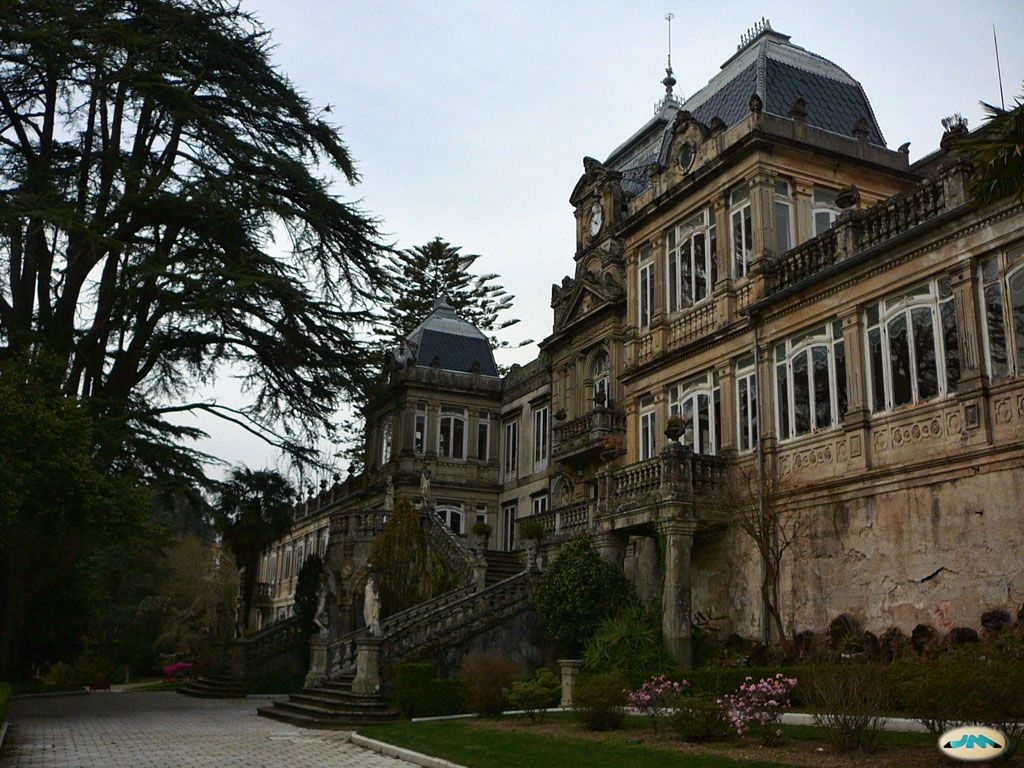
The palace in front of the great cedar

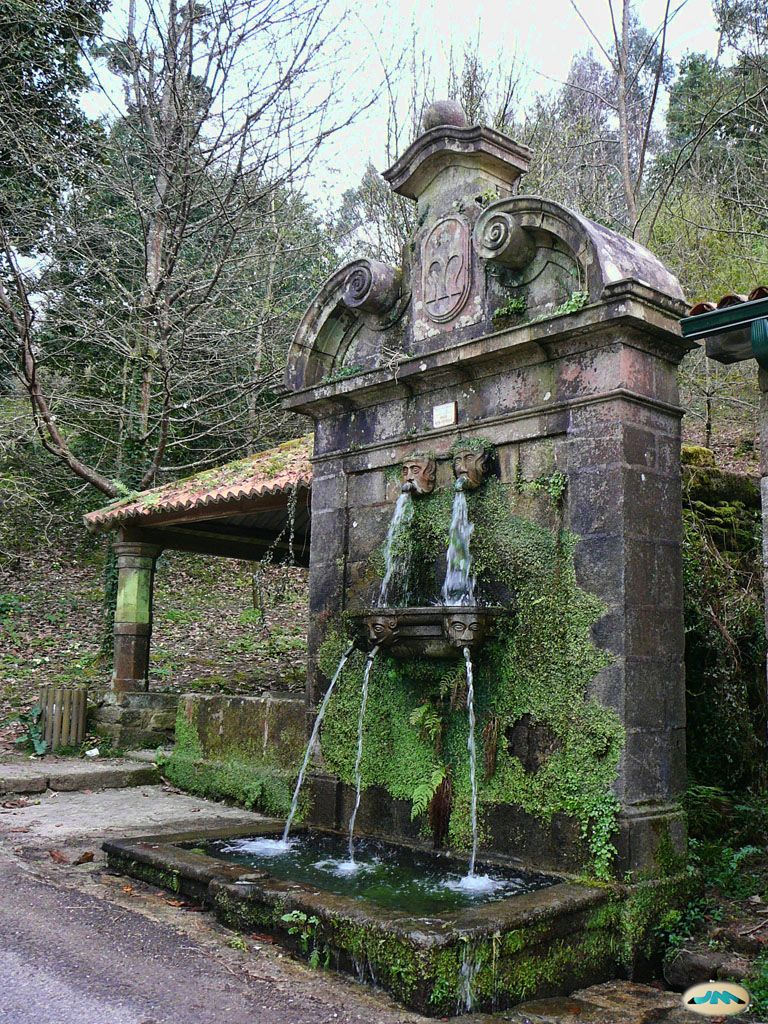
Fountain

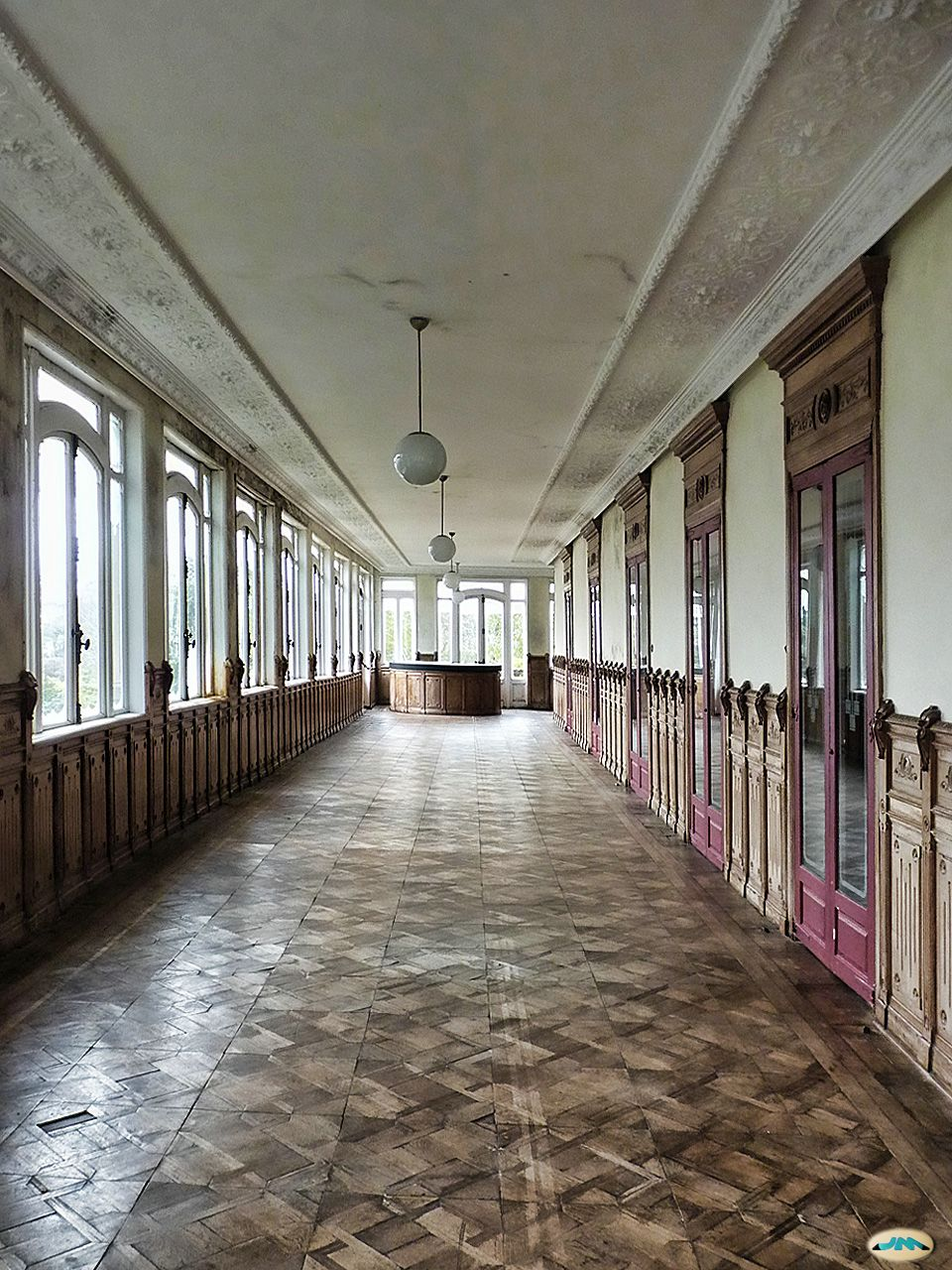
Corridor inside the palace

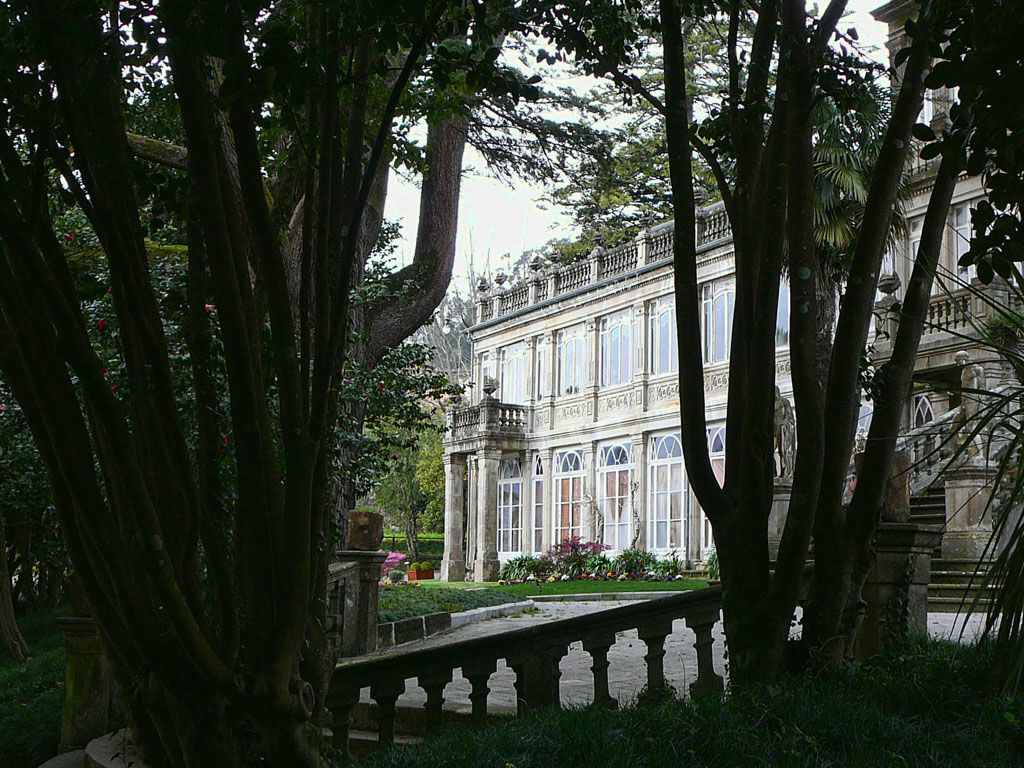
The windows of the pazo in the background from the grove

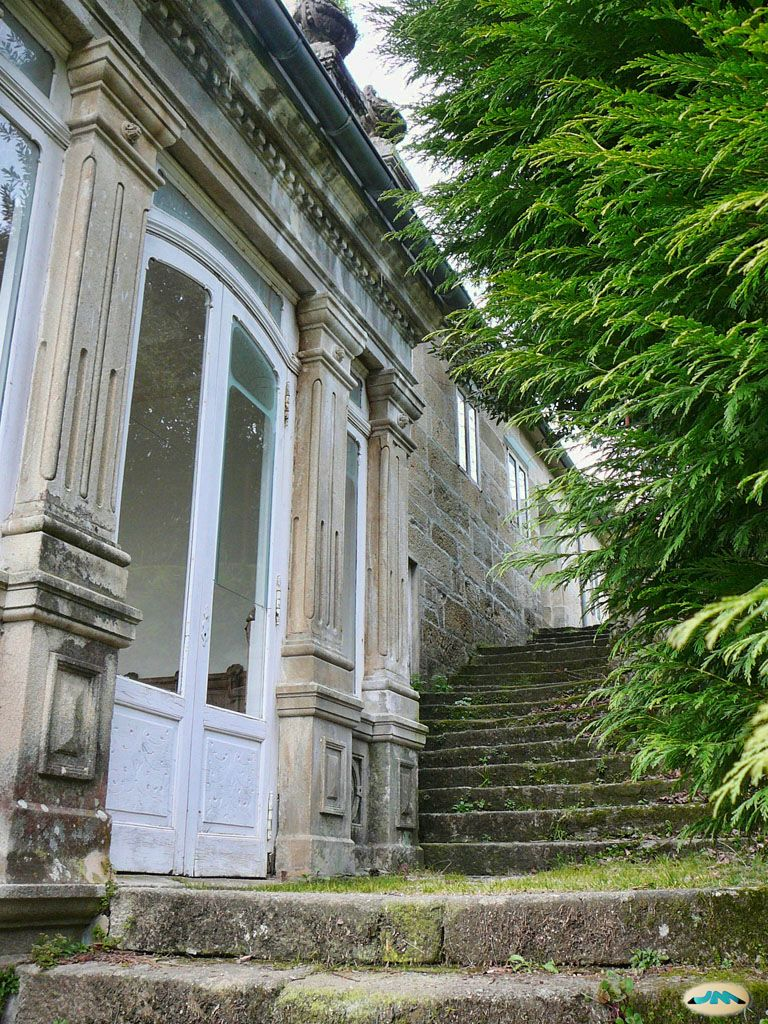
Side of the façade with the staircase and the door

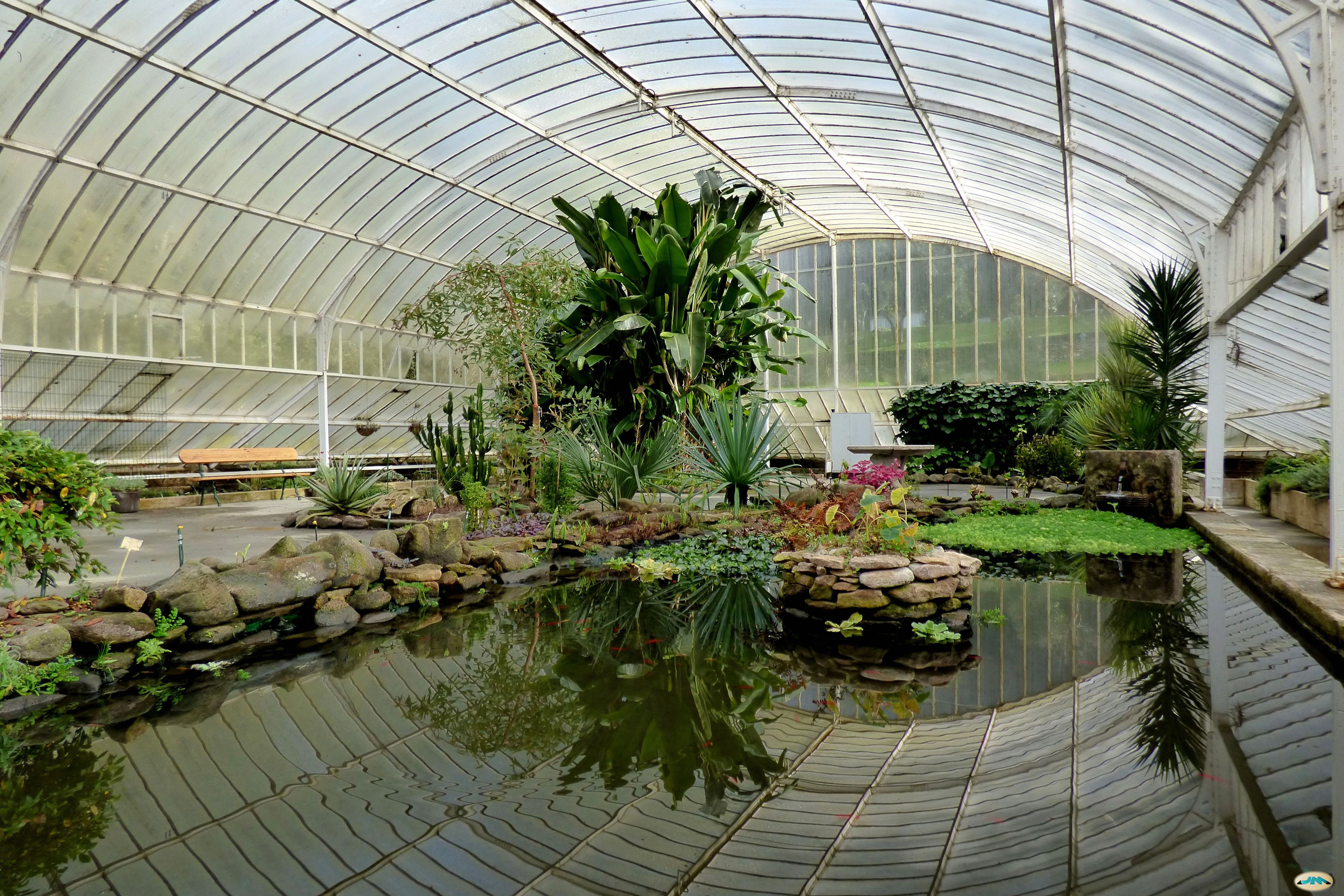
Glasshouse in the palace garden

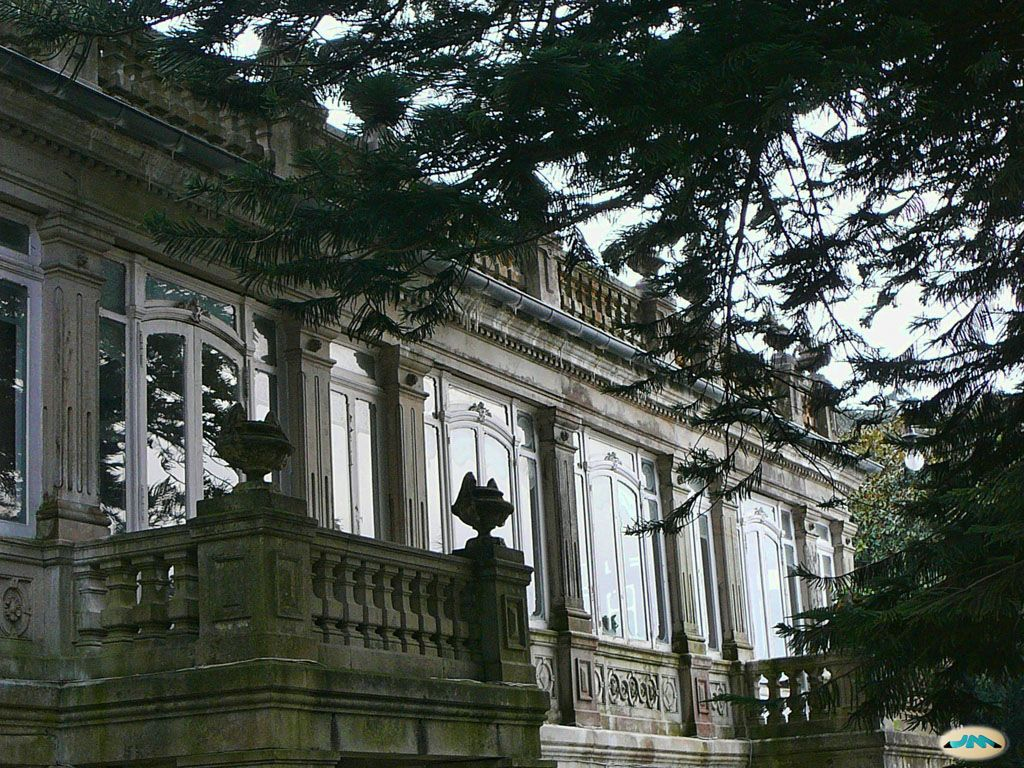
Façade with solainas

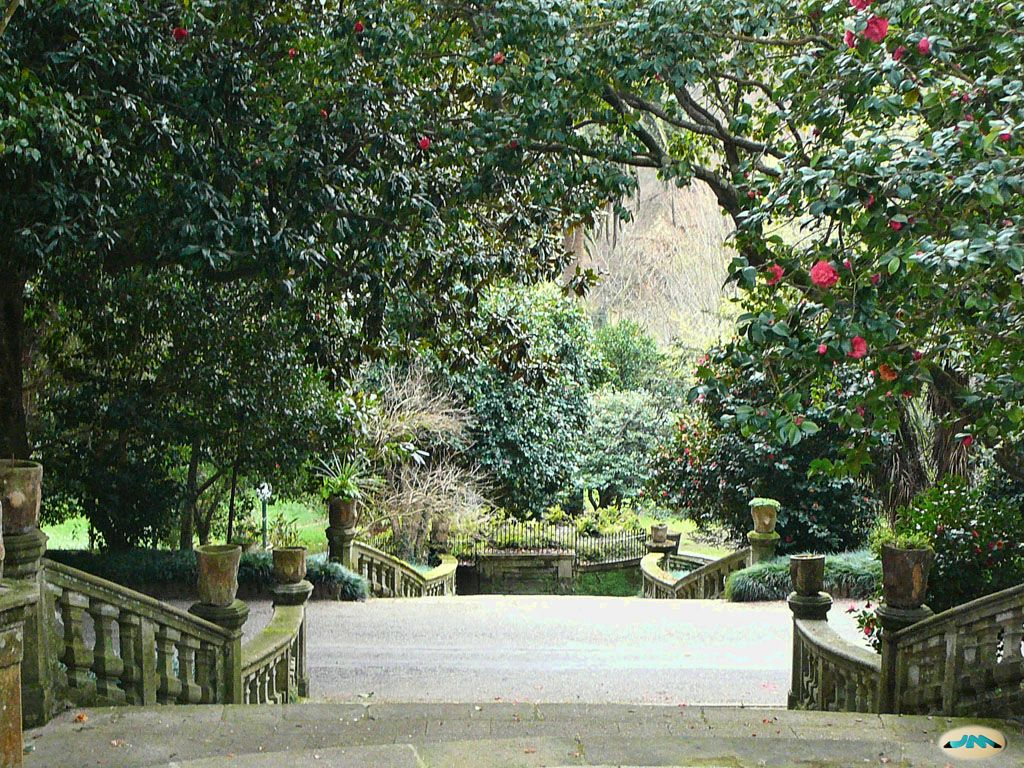
Perron and camellias

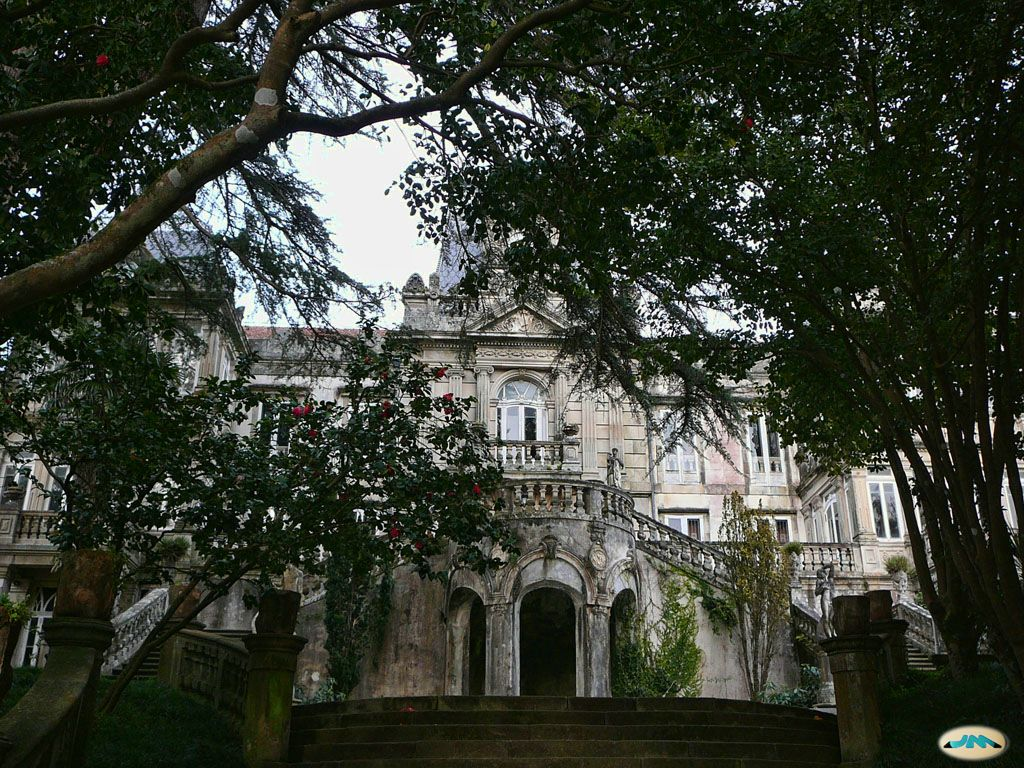
View of the main façade from the staircase

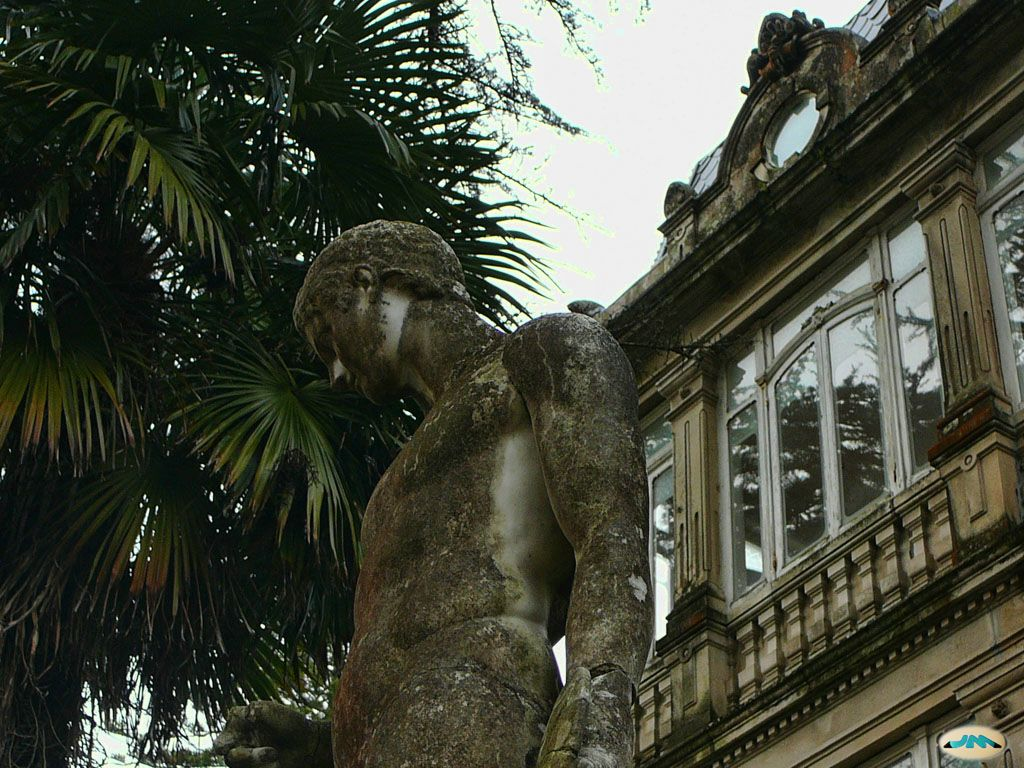
Sculpture in the garden

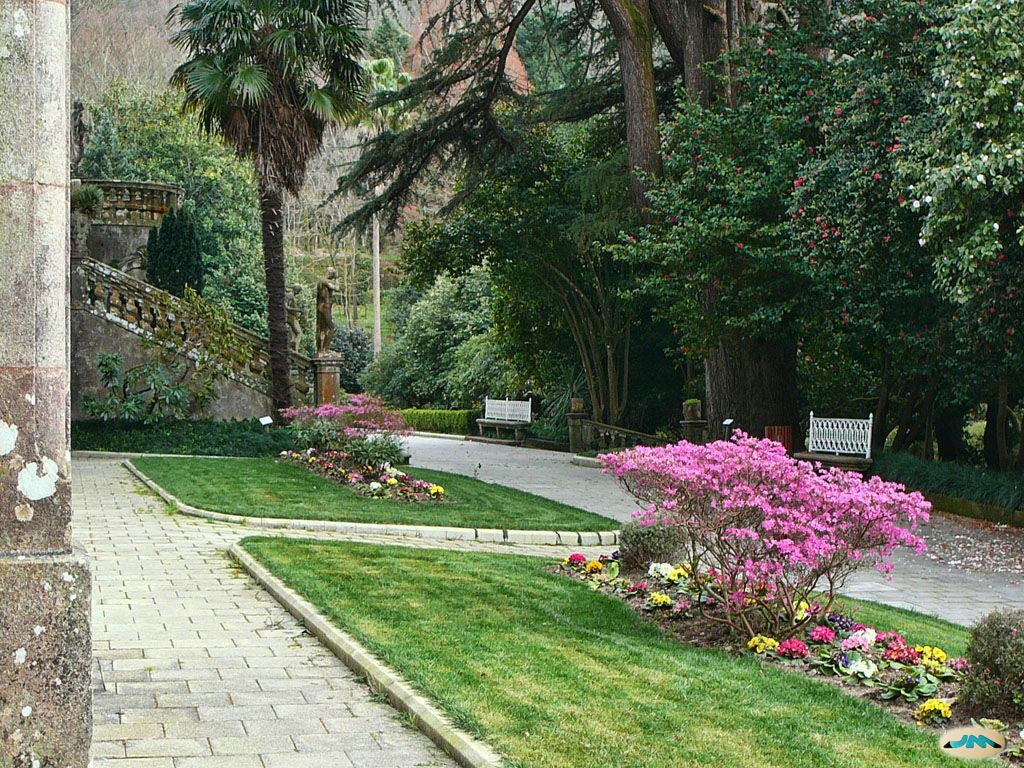
Gardens with azaleas and palm trees

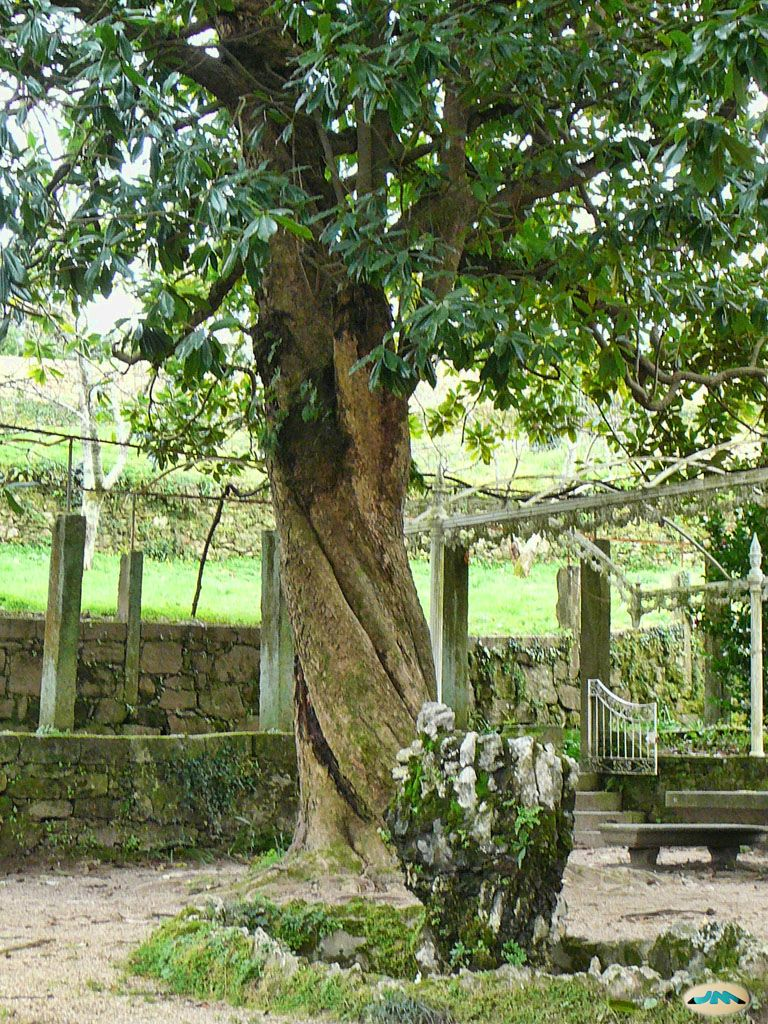
Magnolia

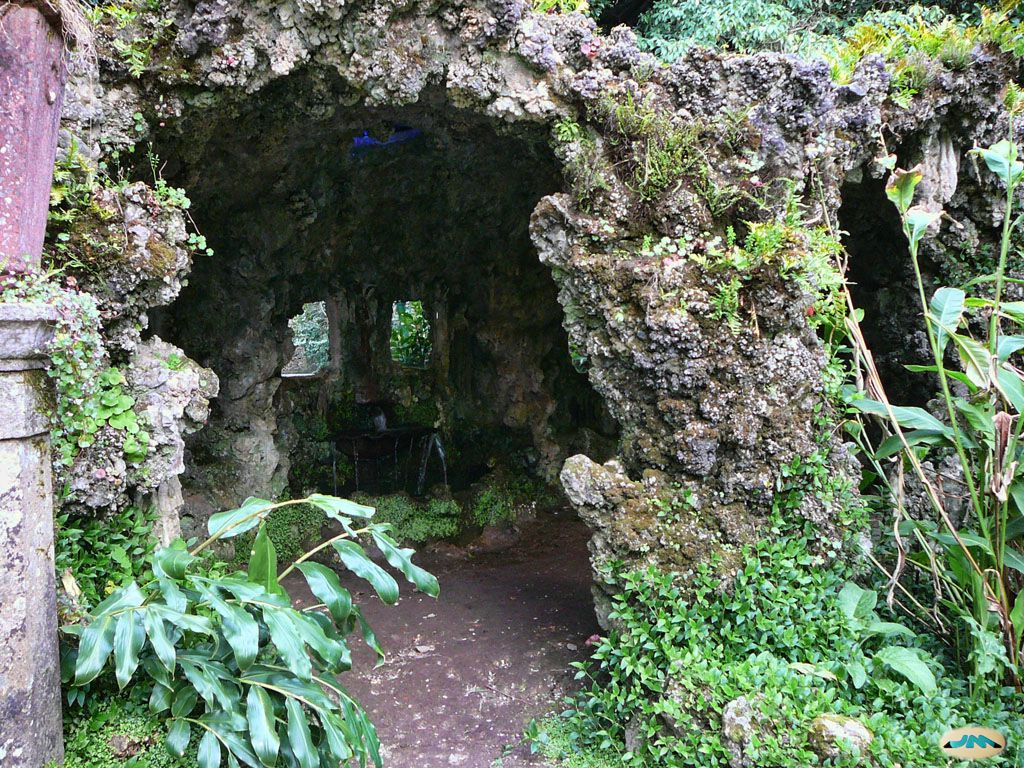
Caves in the garden

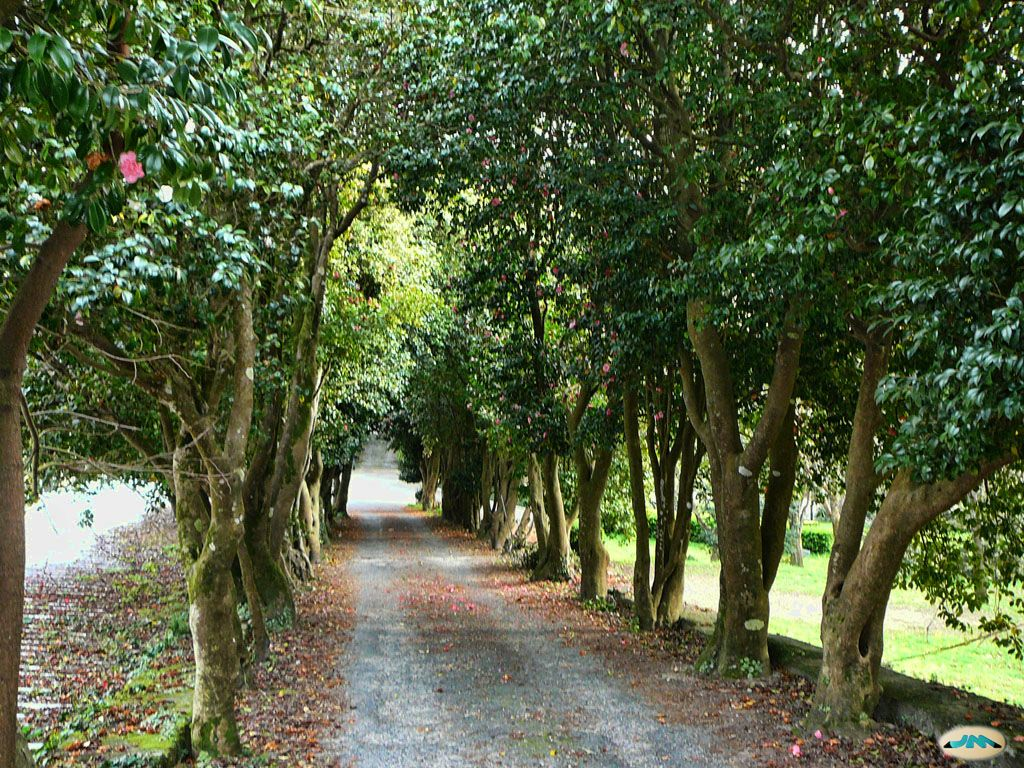
Camellia Alley

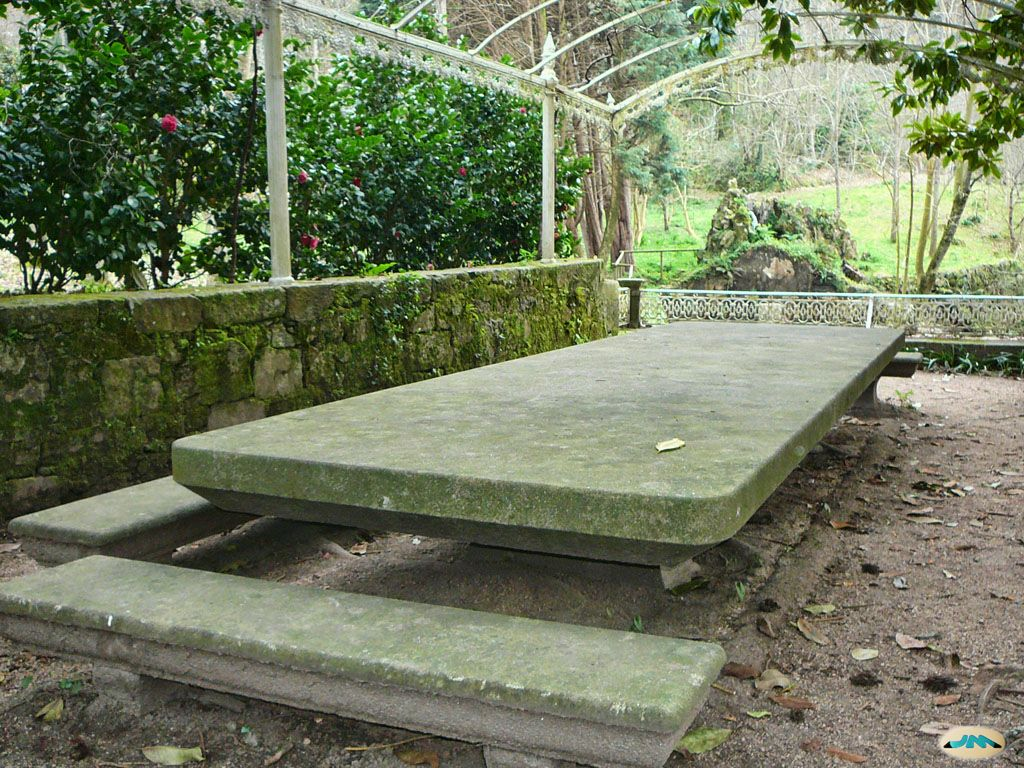
Granite table in the garden under the pergola. The stone may come from a rock on Tambo Island

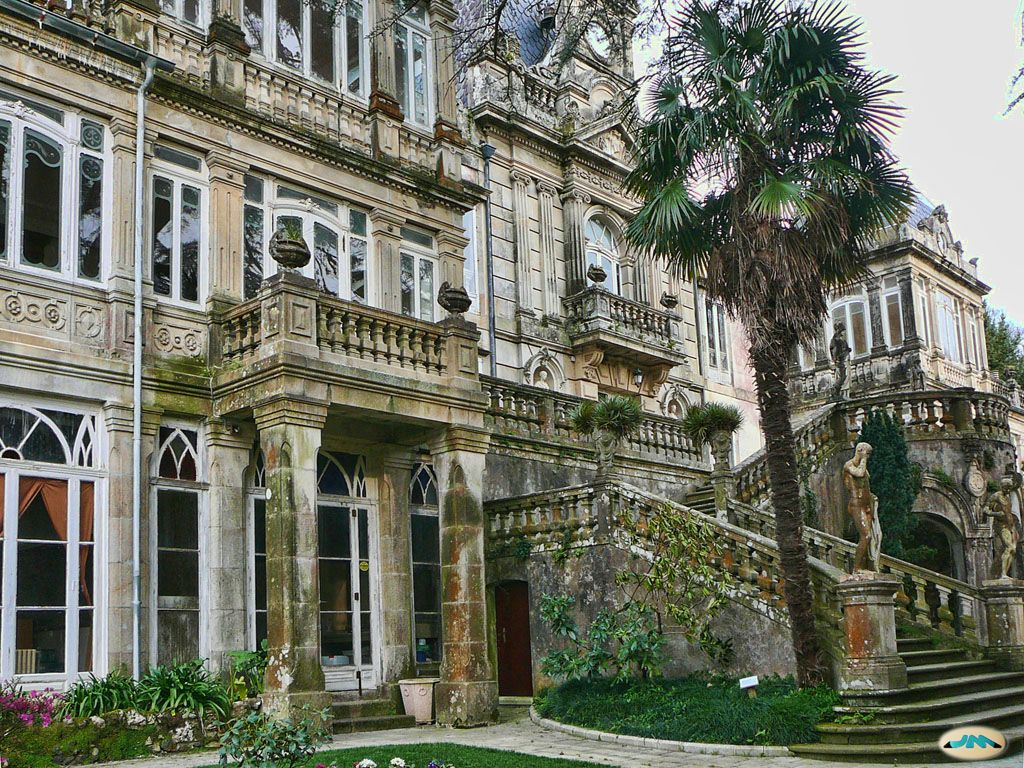
Façade

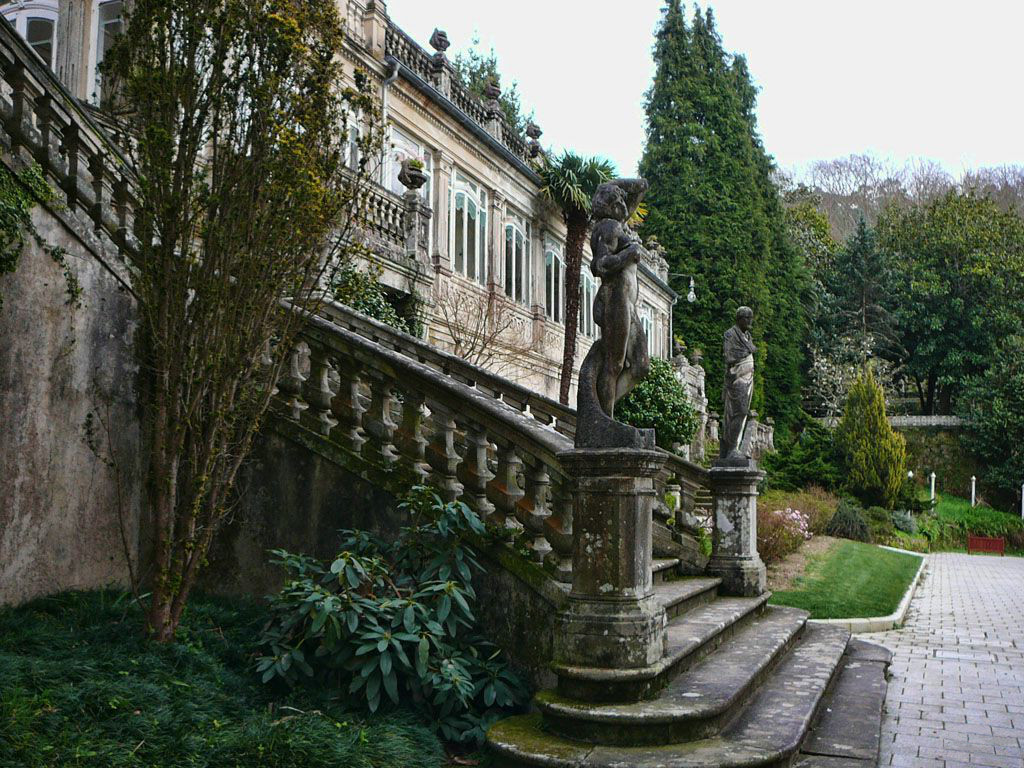
Perron

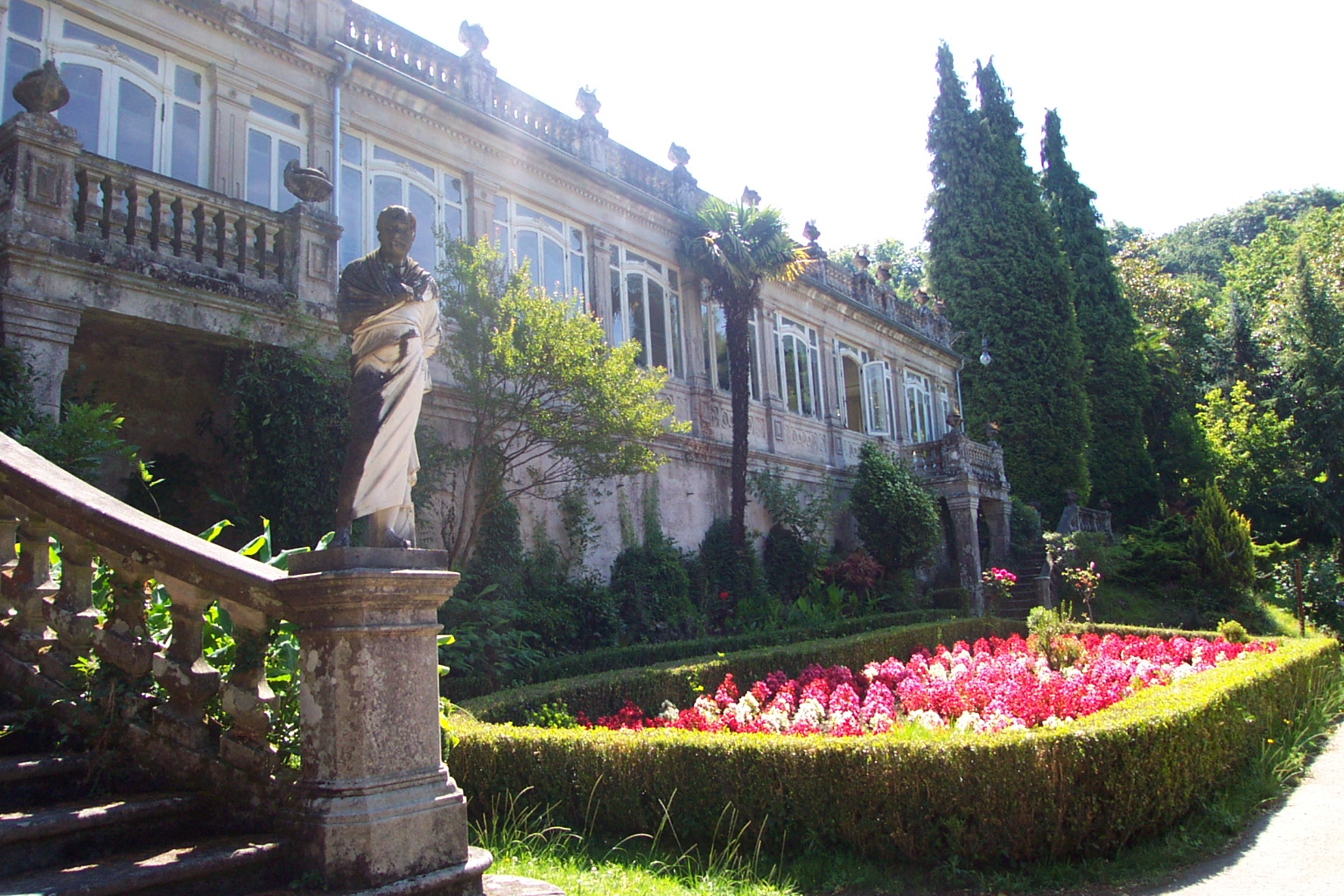
Hedge and flower bed

== See also ==
=== Bibliography ===
- Aganzo, Carlos (2010). Pontevedra. Ciudades con encanto (in Spanish). Madrid: El País-Aguilar. pp. 114–115. ISBN 978-8403509344.
- Arcay Barral, Angel (et altri) (2017). Presentación para la protección del Pazo de Lourizán (in Spanish). Pontevedra: Asociación de amigos de Museo de Pontevedra.
- Fernández de Ana Magán, Francisco Javier (et altri) (1994). Lourizán: de pazo solariego a Centro de Investigaciones Forestales (in Spanish). Pontevedra: Artes Gráficas Portela.
- Fontoira Surís, Rafael (2009). Pontevedra monumental (in Spanish). Pontevedra: Diputación Provincial de Pontevedra. pp. 466–469. ISBN 978-84-8457-327-2.
- Riveiro Tobío, Elvira (2008). Descubrir Pontevedra (in Spanish). Pontevedra: Edicións do Cumio. pp. 86–87. ISBN 9788482890852.

=== Related articles ===
- Arboretum of Lourizán
- Palace of the Deputation of Pontevedra
- Pazo

=== External links ===
- The Lourizán Palace, on the website Visit-Pontevedra
- The pazo of trees, on the Diputación de Pontevedra website.
