= Pazo =

Traditional Spanish manor house

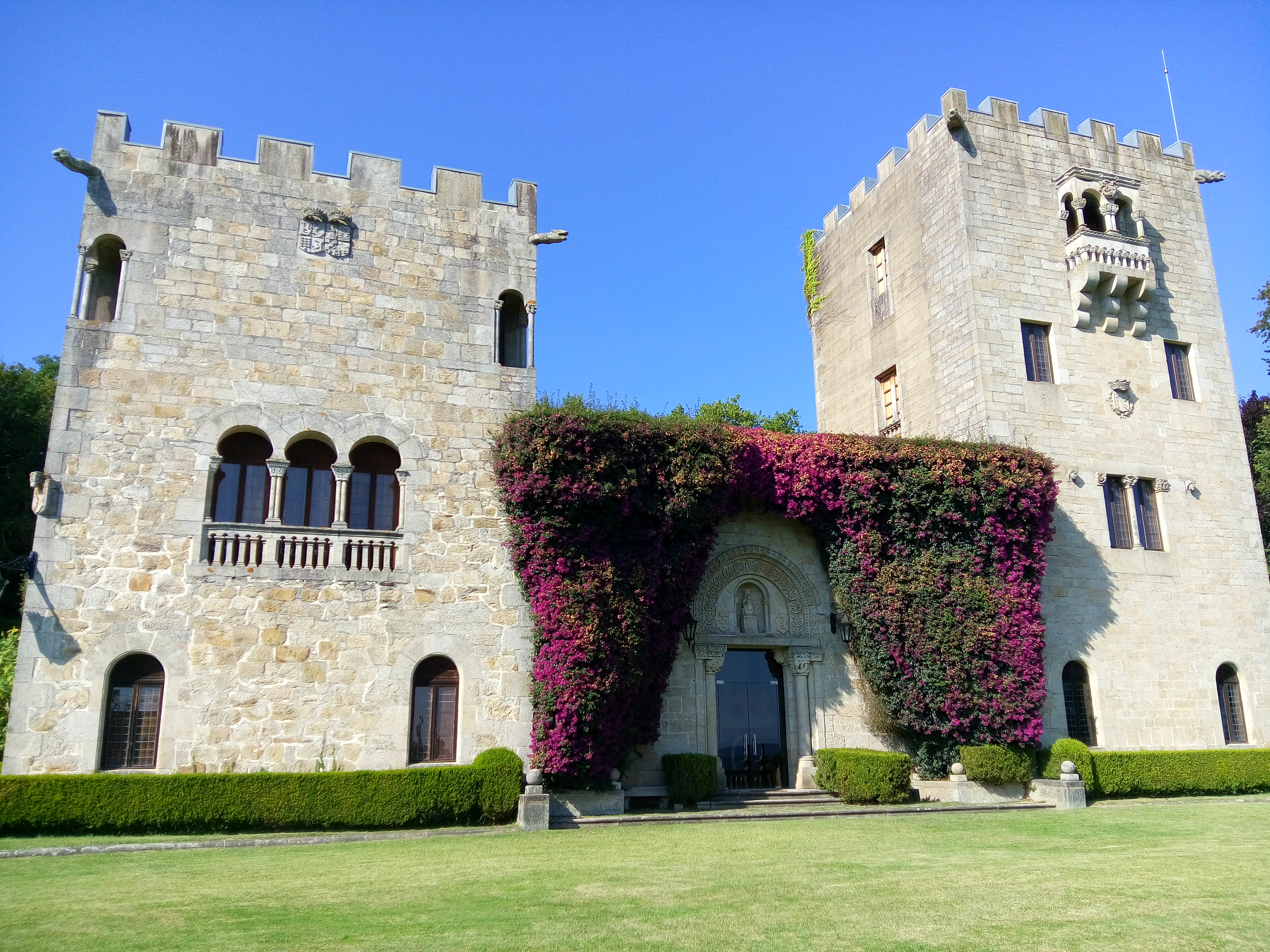
Pazo de Meirás in Sada (19th century), summer home of Francisco Franco

A pazo (Galician: [ˈpa.θʊ]) is a type of Galician traditional house. Similar to a manor house, pazos are usually located in the countryside, as former residences of important people in the community (formerly of kings and nobility). They were of crucial importance in the 17th to 19th centuries, related to rural and monastic architecture and the system of feudal organization, and they constituted a type of local management unit around which the life of the villagers revolved. Over time they became the social symbol and refuge of the noble class, which Otero Pedrayo portrayed in his novels in the early 20th century.

The pazo, as a traditional civil architectural structure, was embedded in a social network: the servants of the nobleman and the taxpayers of the domain, who themselves came to live on the grounds of the pazo (mostly the former). A pazo usually consists of a main building surrounded by gardens, a dovecote and often includes outbuildings such as small chapels for religious celebrations. An example being the pazo de Cadro in Marin, the seat of the House of Romay, which had a chapel dedicated to Santa Barbara.

The word pazo is a cognate of stately palace, and comes from the Latin palatiu(m). As a curiosity, in Portuguese, which is closely related to the Galician language, the word for palace is paço (instead of palácio). In this regard, the Paço Imperial in Rio de Janeiro, built in the 18th century, is an example of the Portuguese counterpart of this type of building.

== Gallery ==
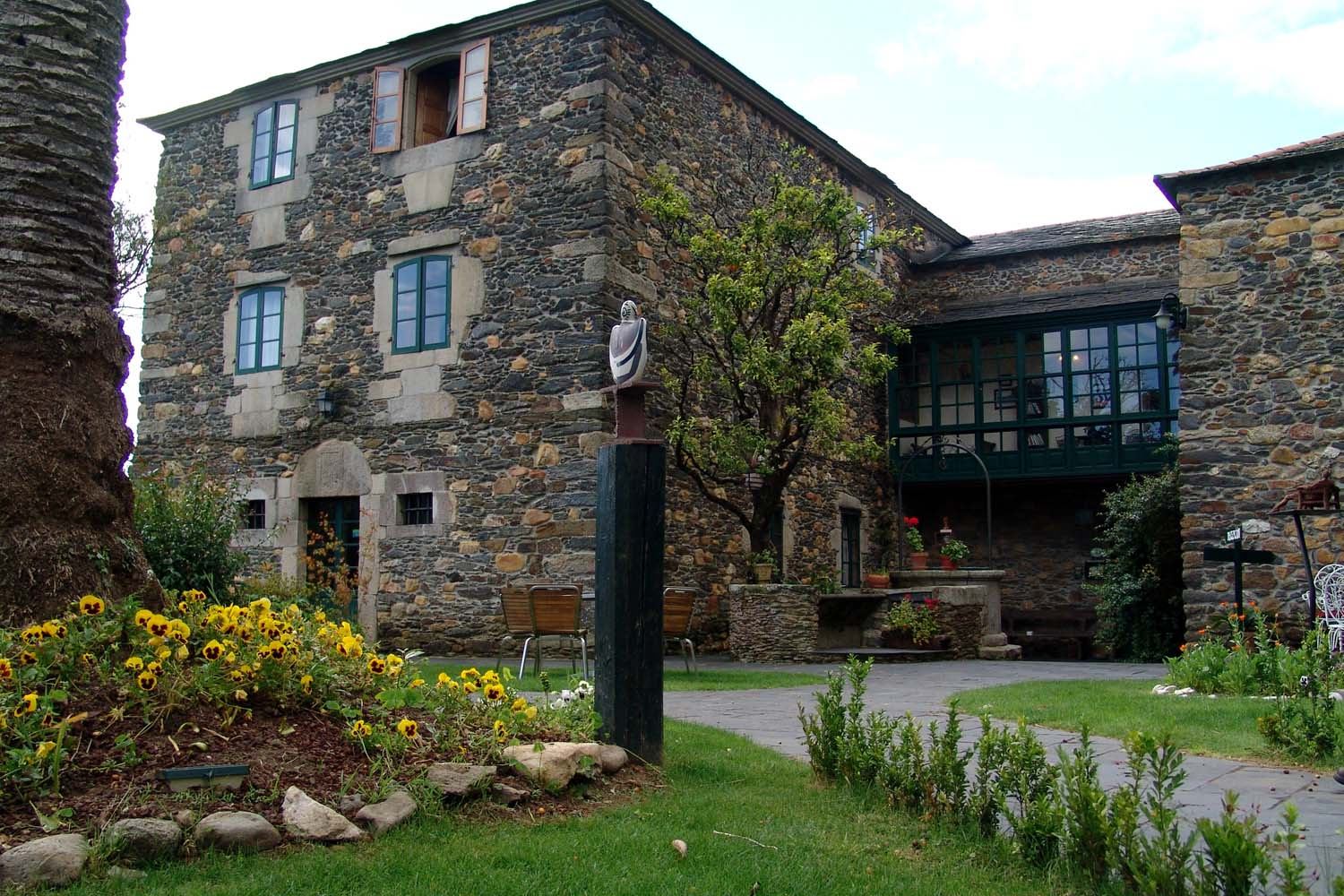
Pazo da Trave, Viveiro

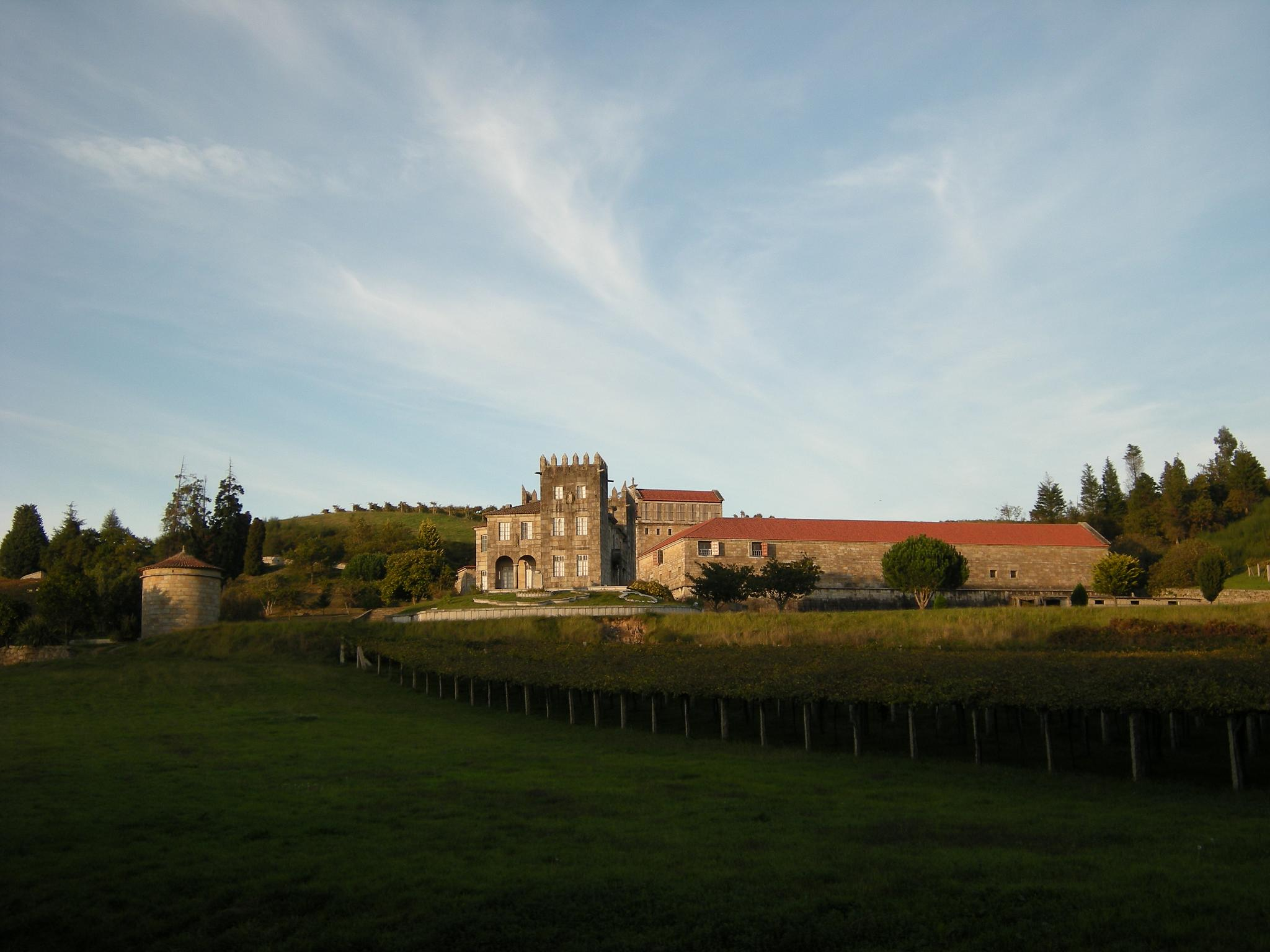
Pazo Baión, Vilanova de Arousa

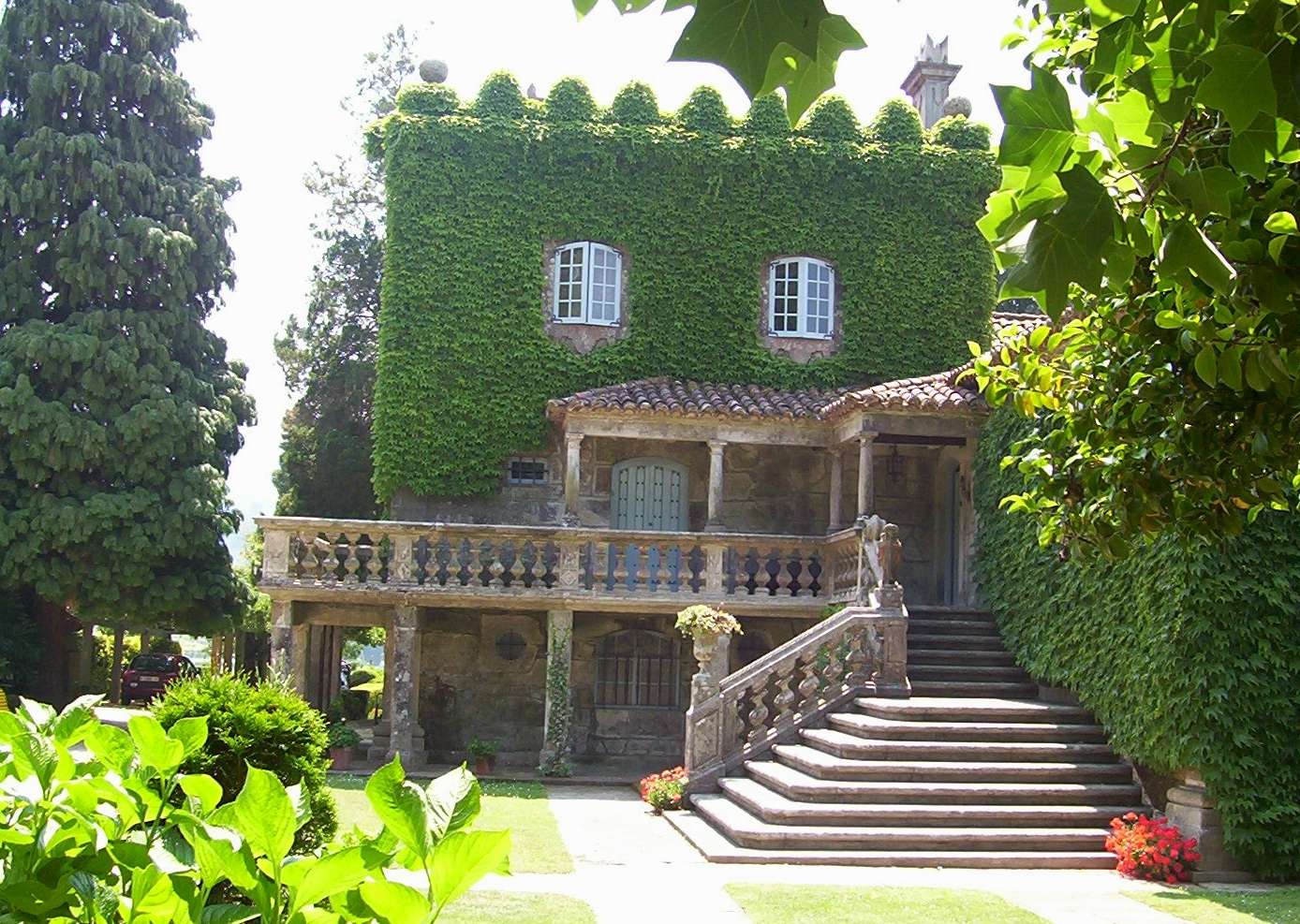
Pazo de Pousadouro, Redondela

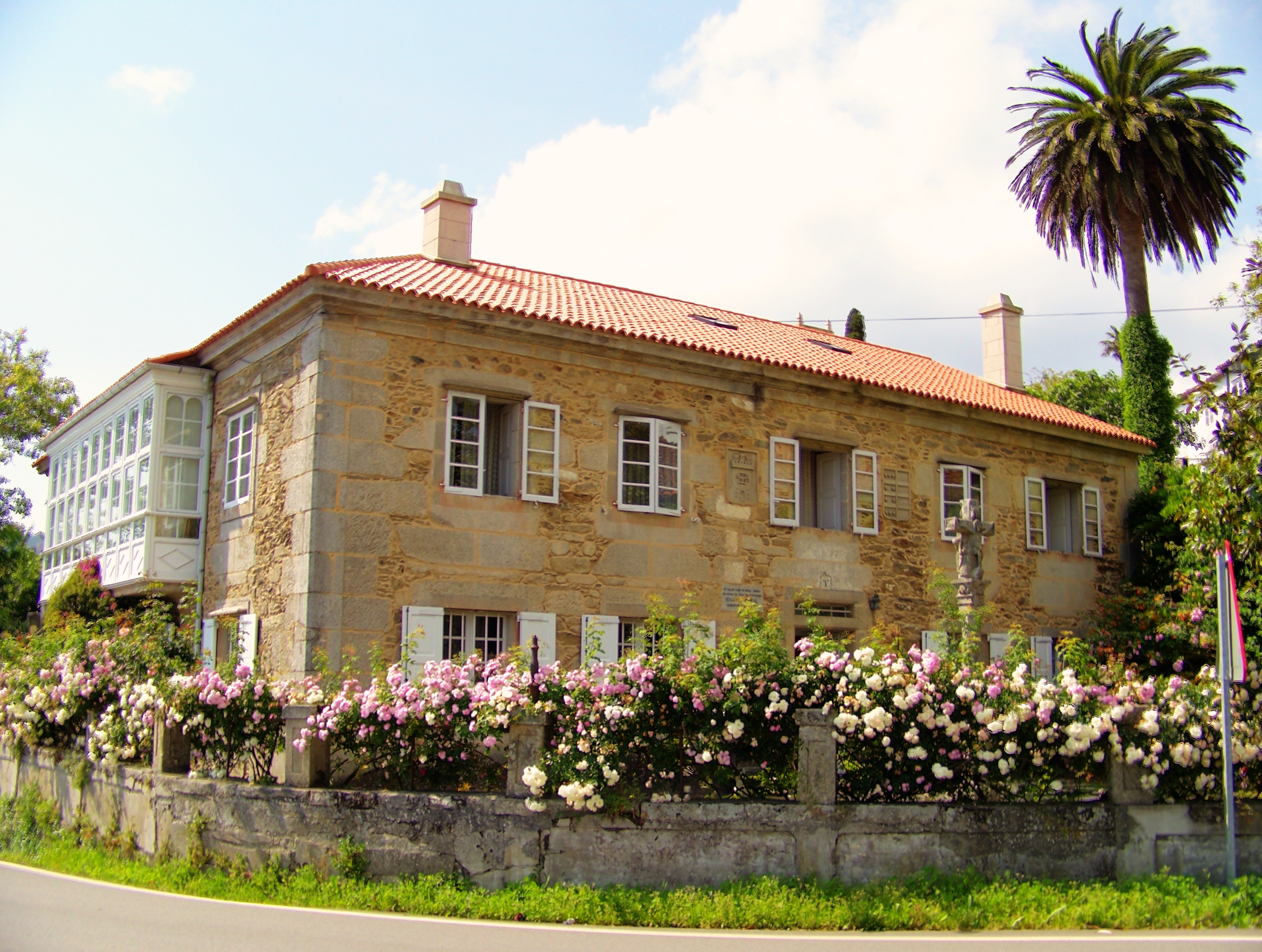
Pazo Pondal, Ponteceso

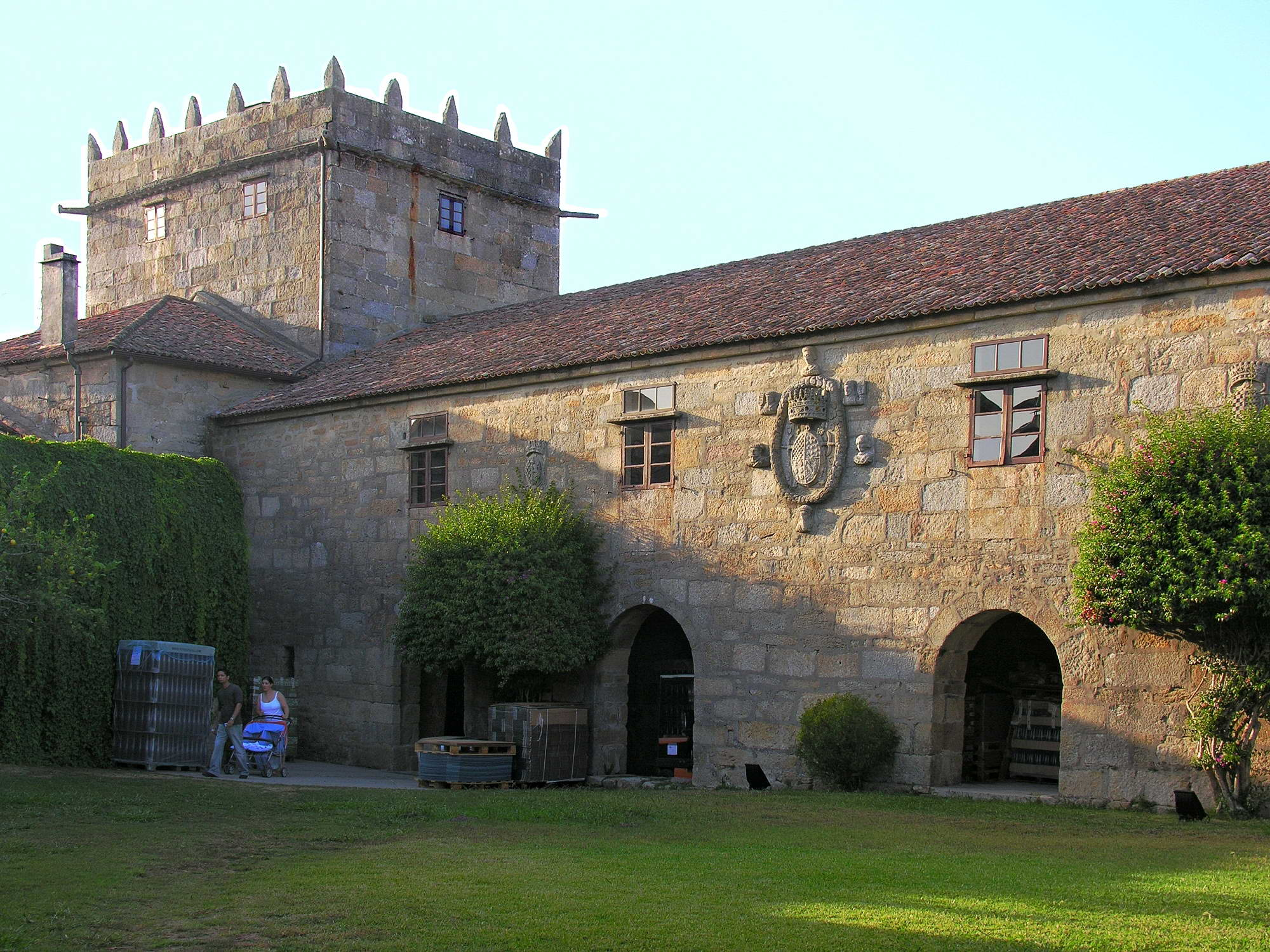
Pazo de Fefiñáns, Cambados

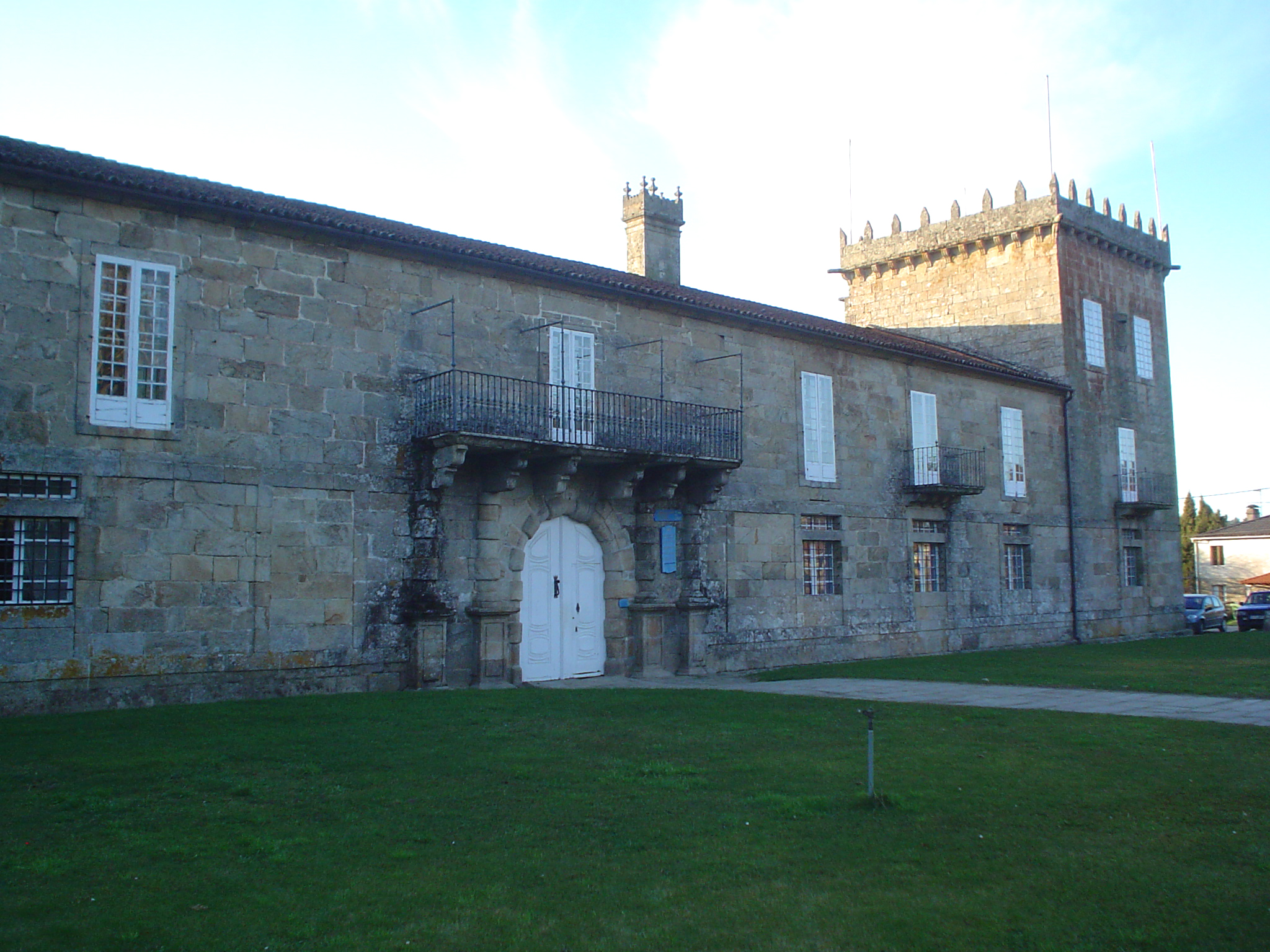
Pazo de Oca, A Estrada

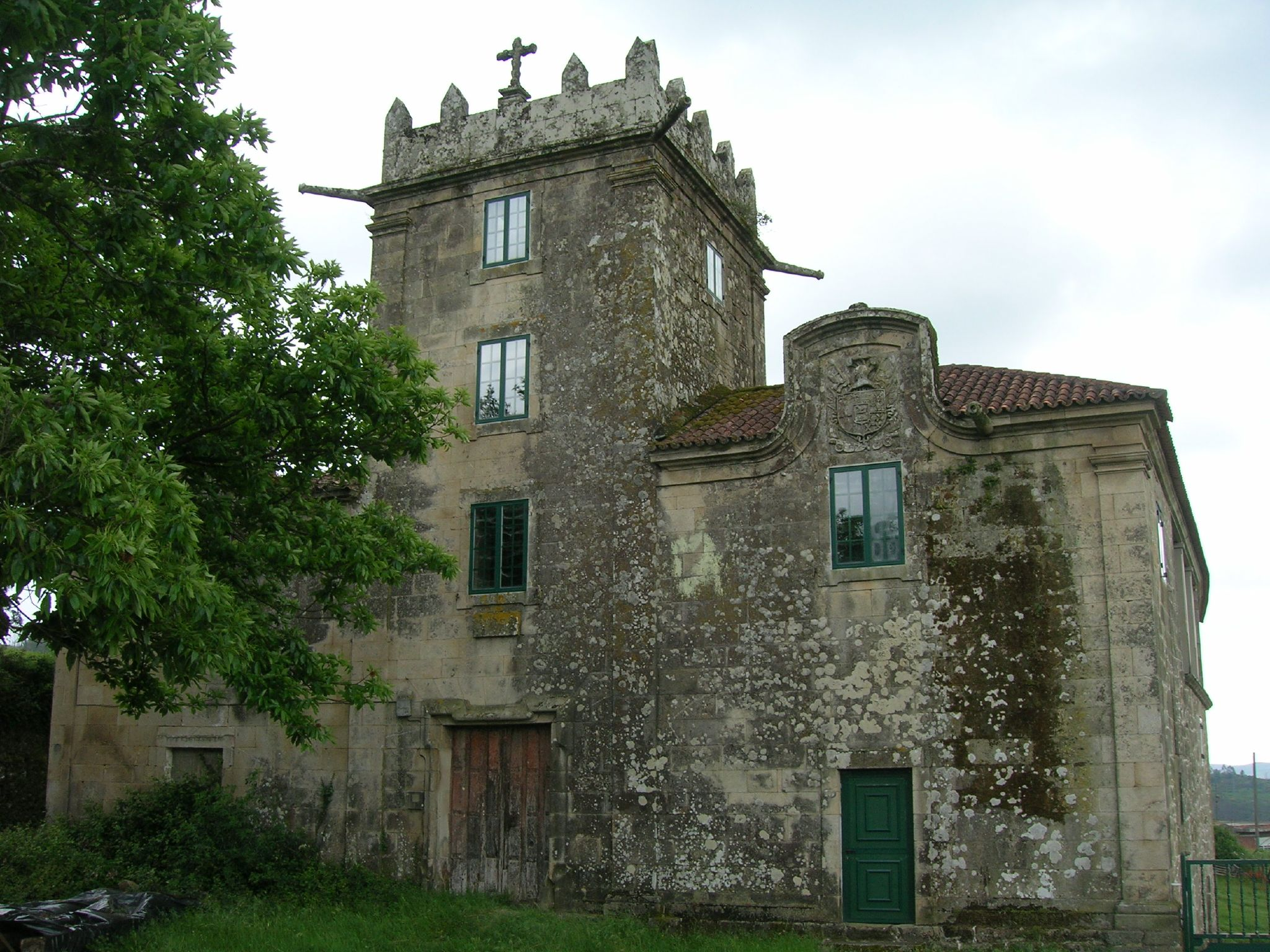
Pazo Bermúdez de Castro, Cotobade

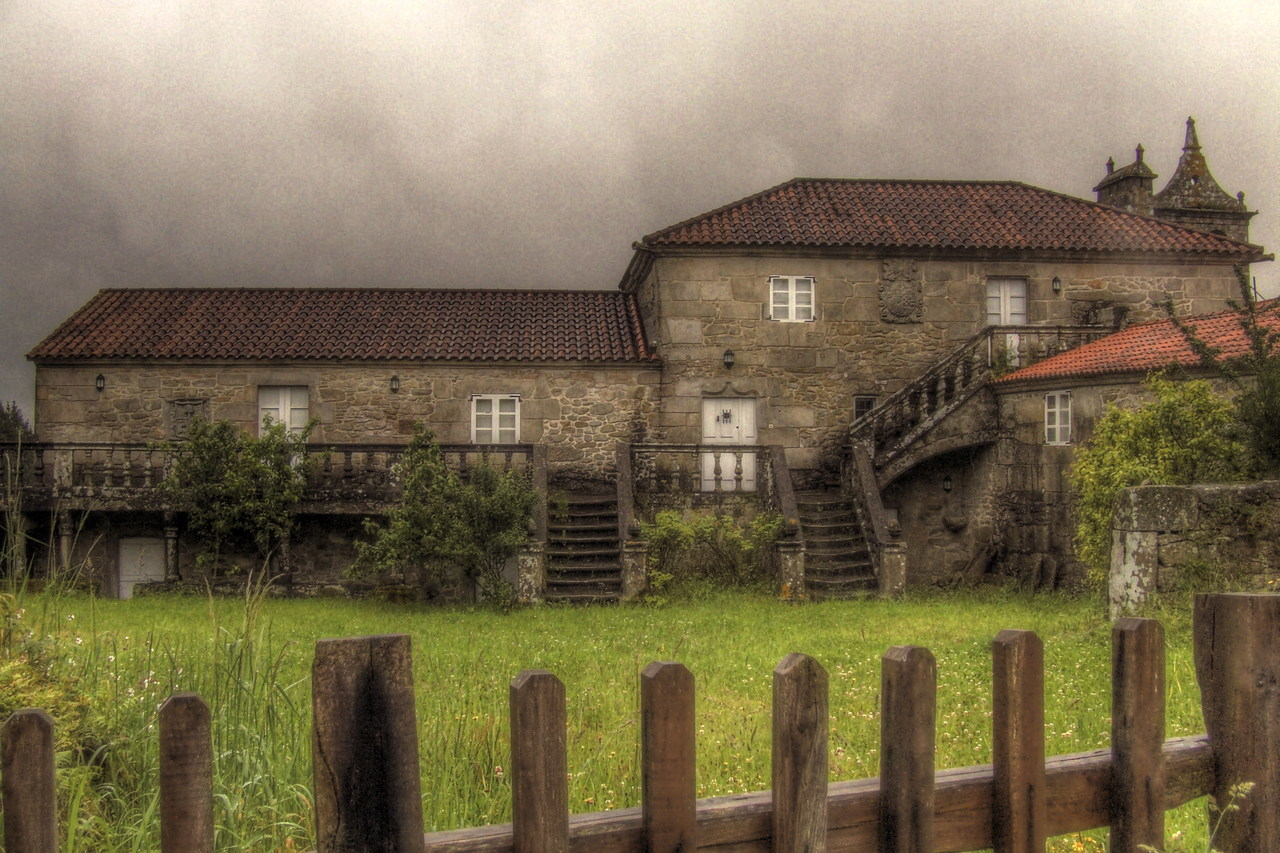
Pazo de Leis, A Baña

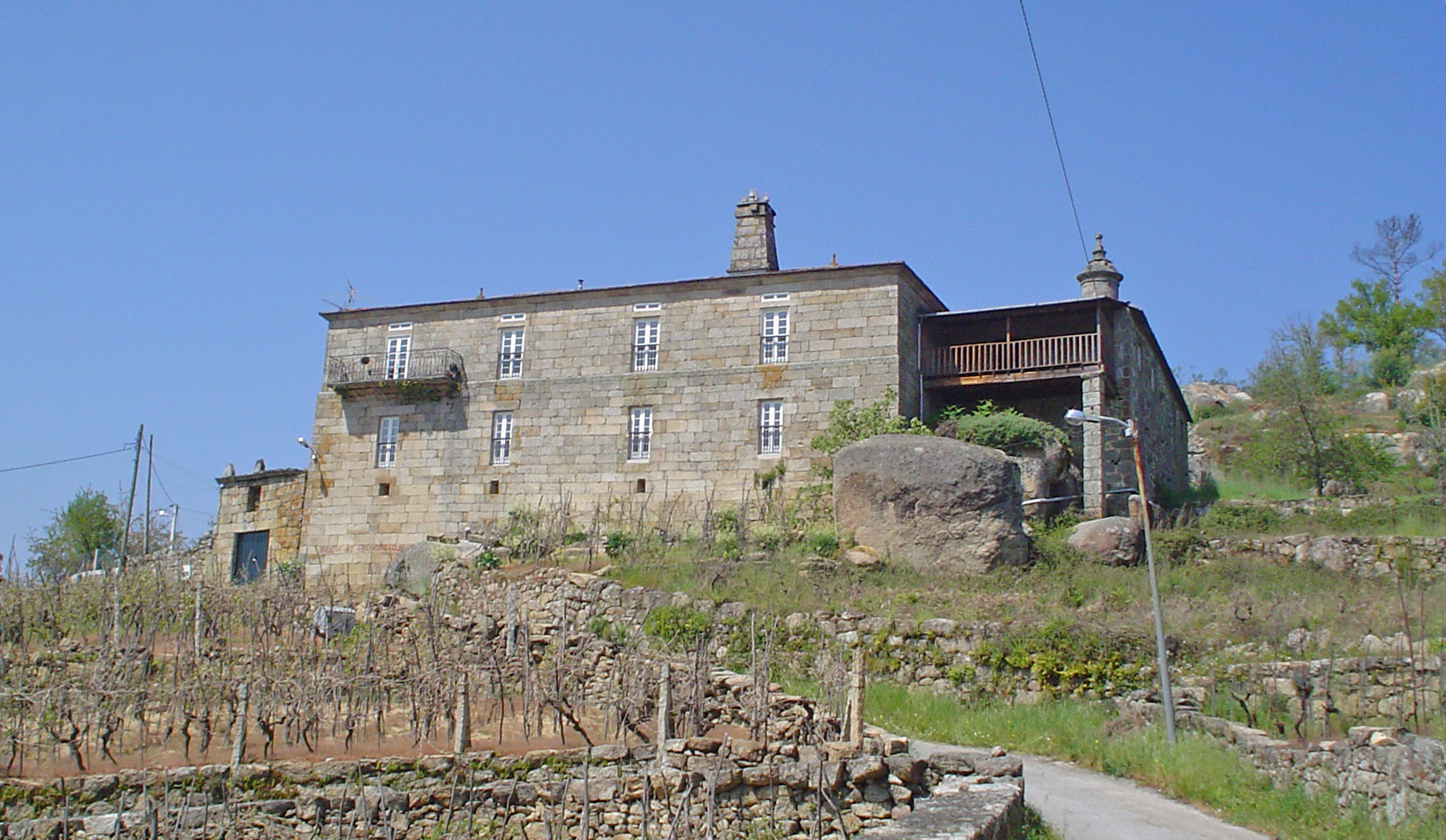
Casa grande de Lentille, Cenlle

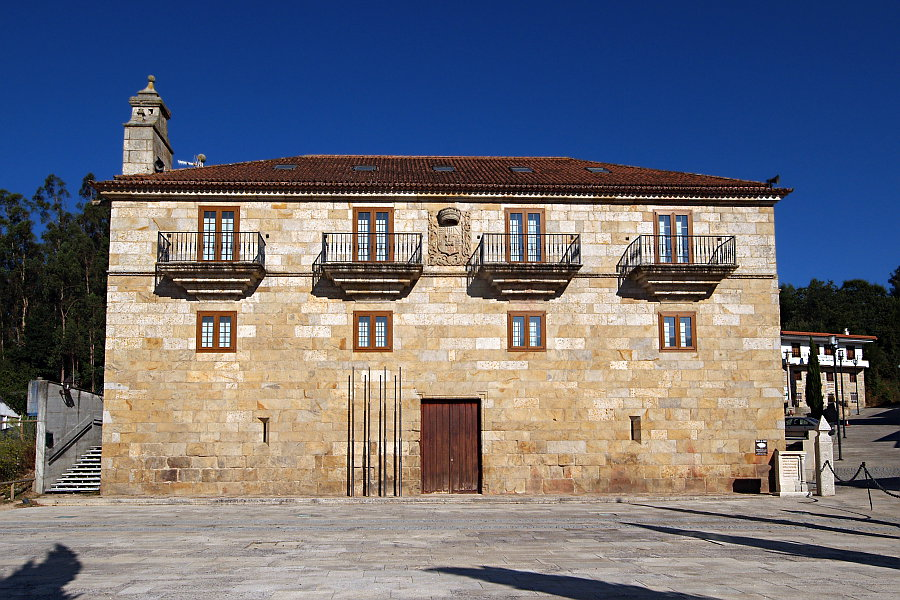
Pazo de Mos, Mos

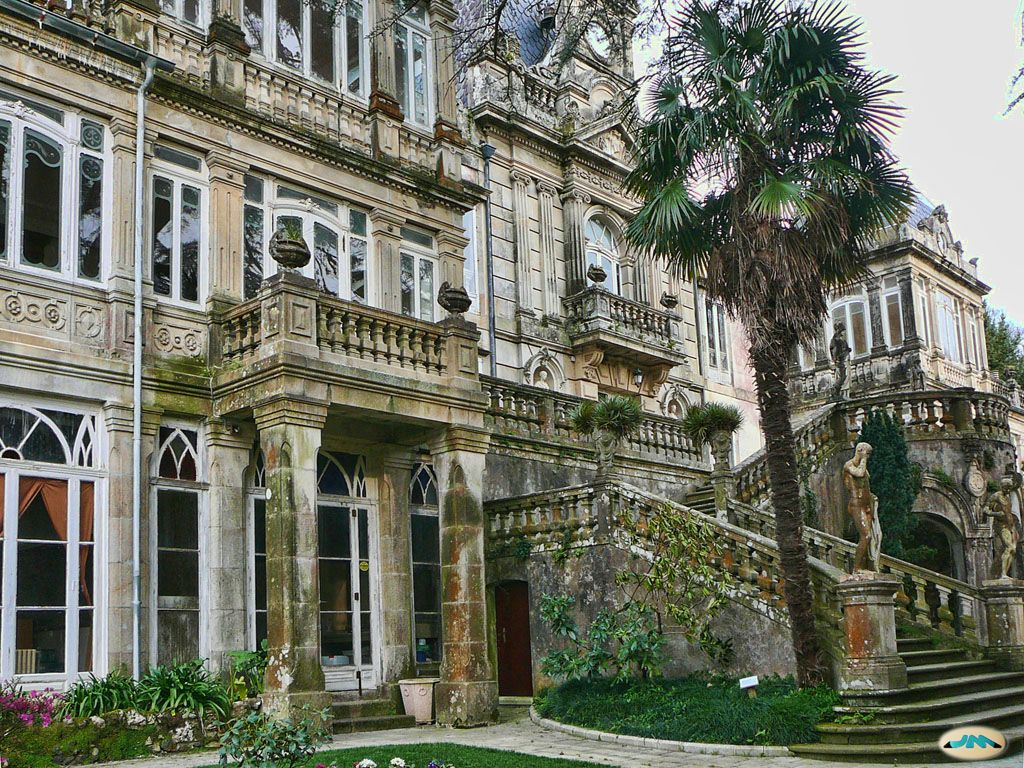
Pazo de Lourizán, Pontevedra

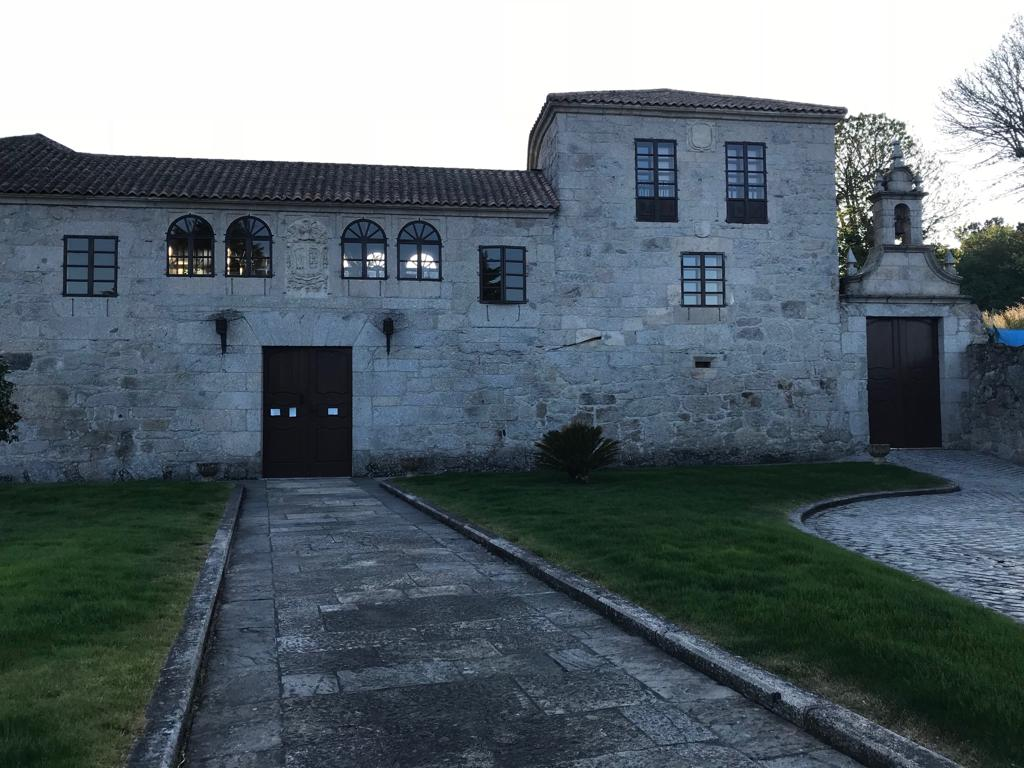
Pazo do Piñeiro, Pesqueiras, Chantada.

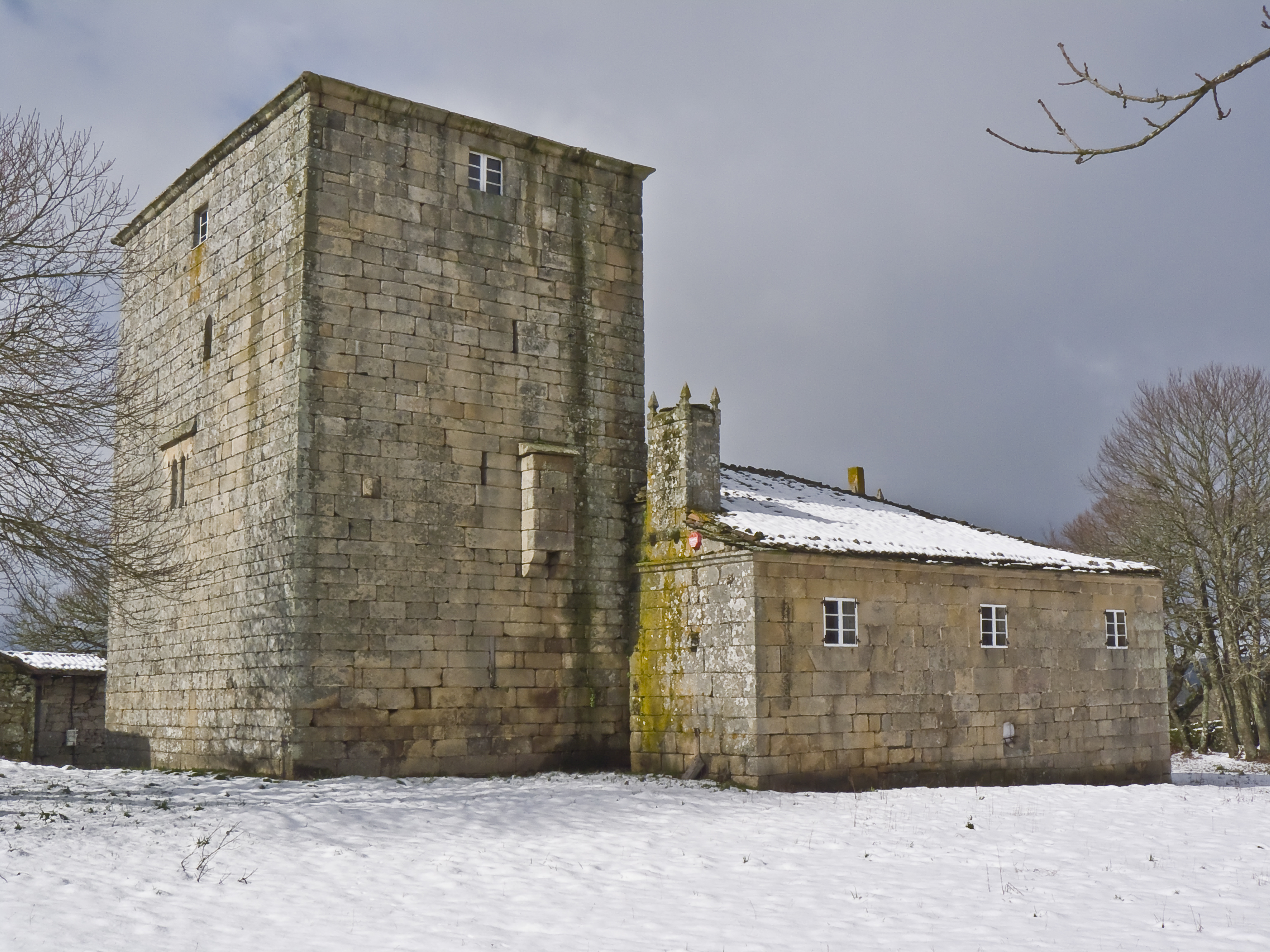
Tower and pazo de San Miguel das Penas, Monterroso

== See also ==
- Galicia
