= Nakhla =

Nakhla may refer to:

== Places ==
- Nakhla, Algeria
- Nakhla Dam in northern Morocco
- Nakhla (Saudi Arabia), an area located in Saudi Arabia
- Abu Nakhla, Qatar

== Other uses ==
- Nakhla (name), a family name, mainly lives in Syria, Lebanon, Palestine and Egypt
- Nakhla meteorite, a Mars meteorite that landed in the Nakhla region of Abu Hommos, Alexandria, Egypt
- Nakhla raid, the first successful caravan raid against the Meccans

== See also ==
- Nakheel
- Nakhl (disambiguation)
