= Palme =

Palme may refer to:

== Places ==
- Palme (Barcelos), a parish in the municipality of Barcelos, Portugal
- La Palme, Aude, a commune in southern France
- Palmanova, in Italy, known as Palme in the local Friulian language

== People ==
- Palme (surname)
- Sieur de la Palme, (Lord of Palme), a lord of French North America for Plaisance in what is now Newfoundland
- Olof Palme (1927–1986), the assassinated former Prime Minister of Sweden

== Entertainment ==
- Palme (film), a 2012 Swedish documentary film
- Tree of Palme, a 2002 anime film

== Other uses ==
- Palme, a Finnish ship which sank off Dún Laoghaire on Christmas Eve 1895, resulting in the Kingstown Lifeboat Disaster

== See also ==
- Palme d'Or
- Praslin, in Seychelles, formerly known as Île De Palme
- Palmen
- Palm (disambiguation)
