= Palm =

Palm most commonly refers to:

- Palm of the hand, the central region of the front of the hand
- Palm plants, of family Arecaceae
  - List of Arecaceae genera
  - Palm oil
- Several other plants known as "palm"

Palm or Palms may also refer to:

== Music ==
- Palm (band), an American rock band
- Palms (band), an American rock band featuring members of Deftones and Isis
  - Palms (Palms album), their 2013 album
- Palms (Thrice album), a 2018 album by American rock band Thrice

== Businesses and organizations ==
- Palm, Inc., defunct American electronics manufacturer
- Palm Breweries, a Belgian company
- Palm Pictures, an American entertainment company
- Palm Records, a French jazz record label
- Palms Casino Resort, a hotel and casino in Las Vegas, U.S.
- The Palm (restaurant), New York City, U.S.
- Palm Cabaret and Bar, Puerto Vallarta, Jalisco, Mexico
- The Palms Shopping Centre, a shopping mall located in the Christchurch, New Zealand suburb of Shirley

== Places ==
=== United States ===
- Midway, Lafayette County, Arkansas, also known as Palm
- Palm, Pennsylvania
- Palms, Los Angeles
  - Palms station
- Palms Apartments, an apartment building located at 1001 East Jefferson Avenue in Detroit, Michigan
- Palms, Minden Township, Michigan

=== Elsewhere ===
- The Palms, Queensland, a locality in the Gympie Region
  - The Palms National Park, a small national park located between Cooyar and Yarraman in Queensland, Australia
- Palms, Walkerston, Queensland, Australia
- Palm Islands, three artificial islands on the coast of Dubai, United Arab Emirates

== Science and technology ==
- Palm (device line), a line of personal digital assistants
  - Palm OS, a discontinued operating system
- Palm (Android device), a smartphone model
- Paralemmin, a protein encoded by the gene PALM in humans
- PaLM, a large language model developed by Google
- Photoactivated localization microscopy (PALM), a fluorescence microscopy imaging method
- IBM PALM processor, a CPU used in early IBM desktop computers

== Other uses ==
- Palm (surname), a name (including a list of people with the name)
- Palm (unit), an obsolete unit of length, originally based on the width of the human palm
- Palm branch, a symbol of victory, triumph, peace, and eternal life
- Palm Sunday, Sunday before Easter celebrated by Christians
- Palming, a sleight-of-hand technique
- Palm, an enhancement to the Croix de Guerre award
- Palm, ISO 15924 code for Palmyrene script
- Pacific Australia Labour Mobility scheme

== See also ==
- Palm tree (disambiguation)
- Palm wine (disambiguation)
- Palme (disambiguation)
- Palma (disambiguation)
- Palmer (disambiguation)
- Palmier (disambiguation)
- Palmistry (AKA palm reading), foretelling of the future through the study of the palm
- Sago, a starch extracted from the pith of various tropical palm stems
- Facepalm
- Nakheel (disambiguation) ('palm' in Arabic)
