= Palm tree (disambiguation) =

Palm tree usually refers to tree-like plants of the family Arecaceae:

- See Arecaceae#Selected genera for lists of genera belonging to the family
- See Arecaceae#Other plants for species commonly called palms, although not true palms

Palm tree may also refer to:

== Places ==
- Palmtree, Queensland, Australia; a locality
- Palm Tree Mosque, Long Street, Cape Town, South Africa; a mosque
- Palm Trees Park, Pontevedra, Galicia, Spain; a park
- The Palm Tree, Mile End, a Grade-II listed public house in London, England.
- Palm Tree, New York, U.S.; a town

== Other uses ==
- "Palm Tree", a 2016 single by Chancellor
- "Palm Tree" (J Hus song), a 2023 song by J Hus of the album Beautiful and Brutal Yard
- "Palm Trees" (Jungle song), a 2023 song by Jungle off the album Volcano

== See also ==
- Palm tree pattern, a German World War II camouflage pattern
- Palm (disambiguation)
- Tree (disambiguation)
- Palmier, a French pastry
- Palmier (disambiguation) (French: palm tree)
- Sansana (Hebrew: סַנְסַנָּה, 'palm tree'), a settlement in the West Bank
- Operation Dekel (Hebrew: מבצע דקל, 'Operation Palm Tree'), an Israeli offensive in 1948
- Nakheel (disambiguation) (Arabic: نَـخٍـيْـل, romanized: nakhīl, lit. 'palm tree')
