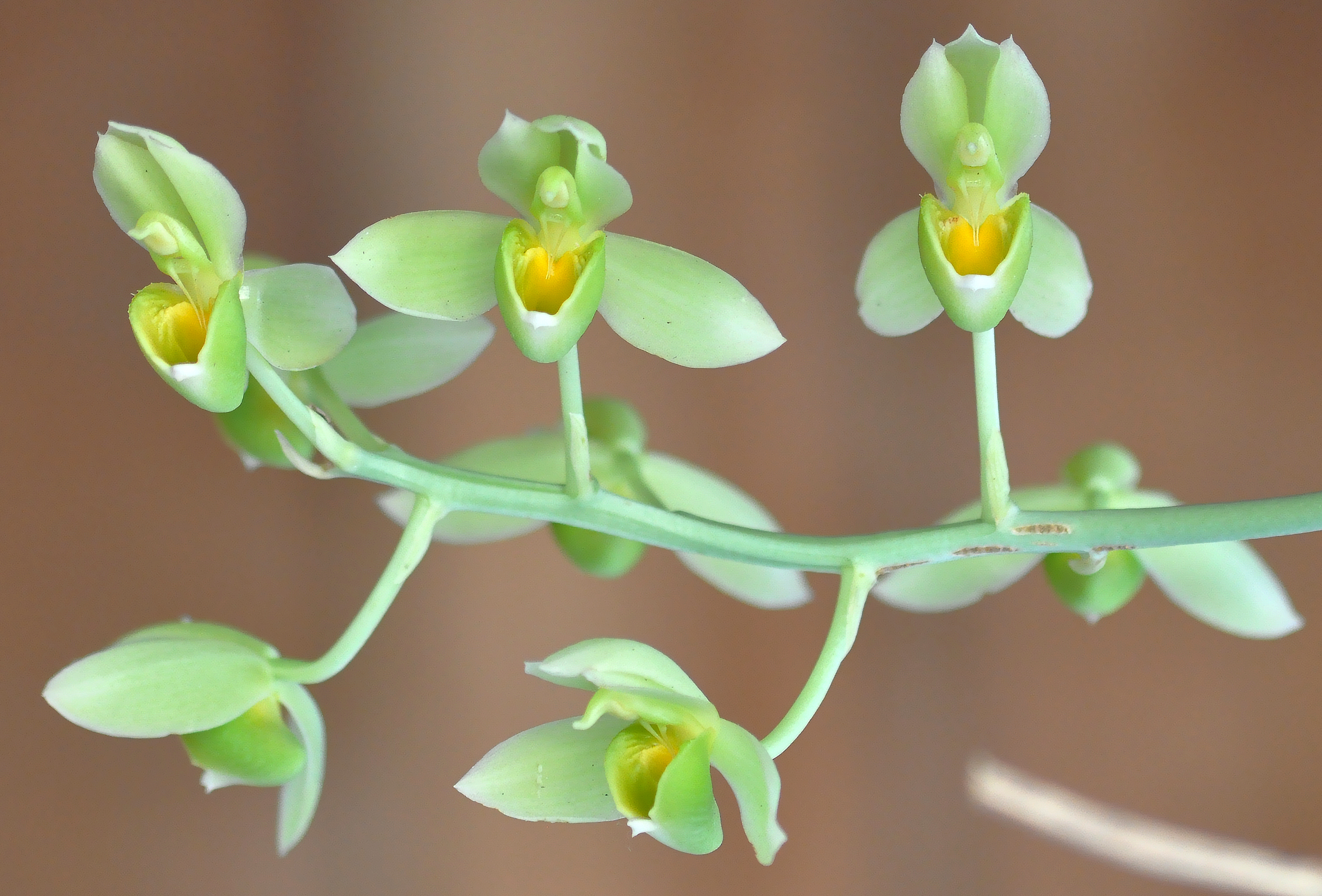

Scientific classification
- Kingdom: Plantae
- Clade: Tracheophytes
- Clade: Angiosperms
- Clade: Monocots
- Order: Asparagales
- Family: Orchidaceae
- Subfamily: Epidendroideae
- Genus: Catasetum
- Species: C. complanatum

Binomial name
- Catasetum complanatum F.E.L.Miranda and K.G.Lacerda
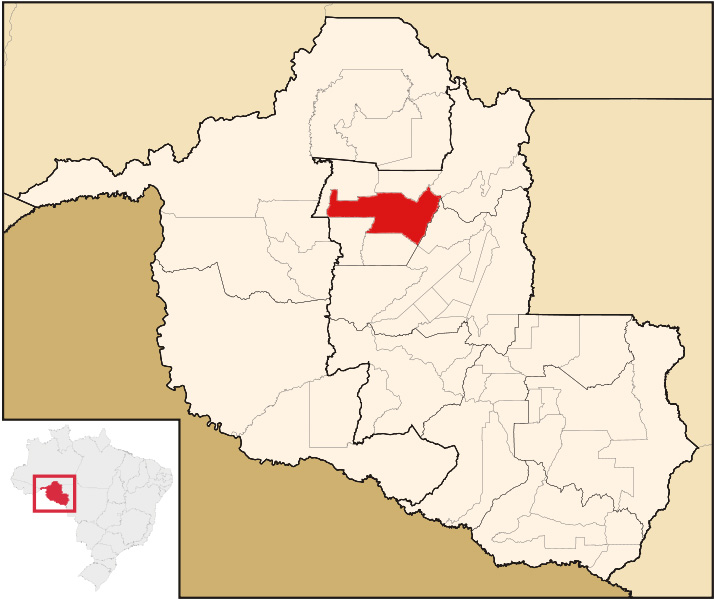
- The distribution of the Catasetum complanatum

= Catasetum complanatum =

Species of orchid

Catasetum complanatum, the flattened out catasetum, is an epiphytic pseudobulbeous species of orchid native to Brazil.

== Description ==
Close-up view of its flower

Catasetum complanatum has an inflorescence that can be up to 18 cm (7.1 in) long and can have up to 18 flowers that are around 2.5 cm (0.98 in) in size. It blooms in the fall with pseudobulbs that are clustered and fusiform. Its petals and sepals range from white to yellowish-green or medium green, its lip or labellum is yellowish-green or yellow, its basal callosity and column is whitish, its anther cap is yellowish, its peduncles and pedicels are green, its pseudobulbs are green wrapped in tan leaf sheaths, and the leaves are medium green. They are also usually pollinated by Euglossine bees.

== Care ==
Catasetum complanatum is a sun-loving plant that needs around 45000 lux, 55% shade, and 50% humidity. It also goes into a leaf-drop state during winter like other Catasetum species.

== Distribution ==
Catasetum complanatum is endemic to Brazil specifically in the municipality of Ariquemes, Rondônia. It either grows on palms or dead trees in rainforests.

== Taxonomy and etymology ==
Catasetum complanatum was first described in Bradea 6:53 by F.E.L.Miranda and K.G.Lacerda. The name flattened out catasetum refers to the plant's flattened pouch lip.
