= Nakhl =

Nakhl (Arabic: نخل) may refer to:

- Nakhl-e Ghanem, a village in Howmeh Rural District, in the Central District of Kangan County, Bushehr Province, Iran
- Nakhl-e Yusef, a village in Moghuyeh Rural District, in the Central District of Bandar Lengeh County, Hormozgan Province, Iran
- Nakhal, a town in Al Batinah Region in Oman
- Nekhel, also spelt Nakhl, the capital of Nekhel Municipality of North Sinai Governorate, Sinai, Egypt

== See also ==
- Nakheel
- Nakhla (disambiguation)
