= Gobierno Militar de Pontevedra =

Government building in Pontevedra, Spain

- Subdelegación de Defensa en la provincia de Pontevedra
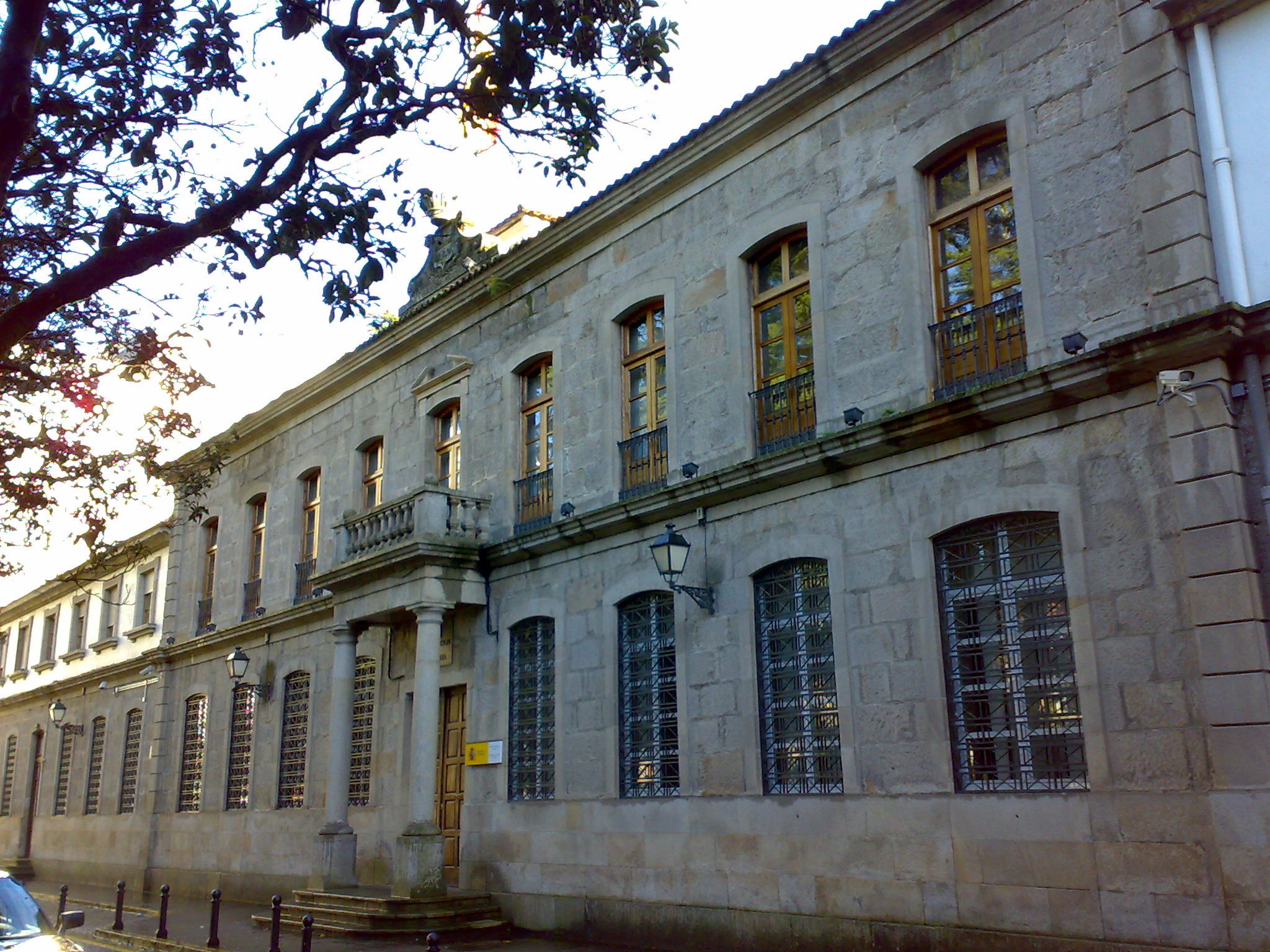
- Main façade
- Interactive map of the Gobierno Militar de Pontevedra area
- Alternative names: Ministry of Defence building in Pontevedra

General information
- Type: Government building
- Location: Pontevedra, Galicia, Spain
- Coordinates: 42°25′46.3″N 8°38′48.6″W
- Construction started: 1889
- Completed: 1892
- Opening: 1892
- Owner: Government of Spain
- Management: Ministry of Defence (Spain)

Technical details
- Floor count: 2

Design and construction
- Architect: Alejandro Sesmero

The Gobierno Militar de Pontevedra or Ministry of Defence Building in Pontevedra is a late 19th-century building located in the city of Pontevedra (Spain) and designed by the architect Alejandro Sesmero.

== Location ==
The building is located at the south-eastern end of Palm Trees Park in the centre of Pontevedra.

== History ==
In 1879, the mayor of Pontevedra, Alejandro Mon Landa, proposed the creation of a schoolhouse to group together the city's primary schools. In 1882, the architect Alejandro Sesmero presented the project. The budget was considered too high and the project was significantly delayed. At the end of 1885, the mayor, José López Pérez, took over the project and Sesmero modified it to reduce the budget. In September 1887, the construction of the building on the former fairground of San José was approved.

The work, entrusted to the builder José Cons Estévez, began in 1889 and was completed in April 1892. The building was inaugurated as a school in August 1892. In September of the same year, the academic year began in the building, which was called Grupo Escolar Eduardo Vincenti (popularly known as Grupo Escolar Las Palmeras), for all the schools in the city.

The building was used temporarily as a field hospital between the demolition of the Hospital of Saint John of God in the Plaza Curros Enríquez and the construction of the Provincial Hospital of Pontevedra (1896–1897). From 1898 onwards, the building housed the Topographical Brigade of the Ministry of Defence in Pontevedra until 1909 when it was returned to the City Council. However, the Pontevedra City Council finally ceded the building to the army for military use in 1913 as the headquarters of the "Gobierno Militar" and the Ministry of Defence of the province of Pontevedra.

On 19 June 1995, the former "Gobierno Militar" of Pontevedra was transformed into the Defence Department Office of the province of Pontevedra. A few years later, by decree of 7 November 2003, the Pontevedra Defence Office became, as in most Spanish provincial capitals, the "Subdelegación" of Defence of the province.

== Description ==
The building was originally designed by the architect Alejandro Sesmero with a single floor to prevent children from falling down the stairs.

It is a rectangular, elongated building with a predominance of horizontal lines. It consists of a ground and first floor and three sections on the main façade. The windows and doors have flat frames ending in segmental arches. The central section of the façade is slightly more advanced and decorated than the side sections. The main entrance has a stone balcony on the first floor supported by two columns with Tuscan capitals which support a simple entablature.

The rear façade is similar in design to the main façade but has a central projecting section in place of the balcony and the porticoed entrance to the building. It is surrounded by a space with trees and gardens for the private use of the Ministry of Defence.

== See also ==
=== Bibliography ===
- Fontoira Surís, Rafael (2009). Pontevedra Monumental (in Galician). Pontevedra: Diputación de Pontevedra. p. 424. ISBN 9788484573272.

=== Related articles ===
- Palm Trees Park
- Ministry of Defence (Spain)
- Saint Ferdinand Barracks

=== External links ===
- File of the Ministry of Defence office in Pontevedra
- Services of the Office of the Ministry of Defence of Pontevedra
