= Palmier (disambiguation) =

Palmier (French: feuille de palmier, lit. 'palm leaf') is a French pastry.

Palmier (French: palm tree, palm) may also refer to:

- Palmier (surname)
- Fontaine du Palmier (French: Palmier Fountain, lit. 'Palm Fountain'), Place du Chatelet, 1st Arrondissement, Paris, France
- Château des Palmiers (French: Palms Chateau, lit. 'Palm Trees Castle'), Plum Bay, Terres Basses, Saint Martin, Overseas France, Caribbean Sea; an estate used by Donald Trump
- French ship Palmier (1752), a 74-gun ship of the line of the French Navy
- Palmier Kingdom, a fictional polity from anime-manga subfranchise Yes! PreCure 5 of the Precure/Pretty Cure animanga meta-franchsie

== See also ==
- Palm tree (disambiguation)
- Palm (disambiguation)
- Palmer (disambiguation)
