= Nakheel =

Nakheel (Arabic: نَـخٍـيْـل, romanized: nakhīl, lit. 'palm tree', palm), el-Nakheel, Al Nakheel, may refer to:

== Places ==
=== United Arab Emirates ===
- Al Nakheel, Ras Al Khaimah, United Arab Emirates; a suburb
- Sas Al Nakheel Air Base (ICAO airport code OMNK; IATA airport code XXX), Abu Dhabi, United Arab Emirates; a military base of the United Arab Emirates Air Force

==== Dubai ====
- Nakheel Tower (Arabic: بُرْجُ ٱلنَّخِيلِ, romanized: burju lnawkhīli, lit. 'The Palm Tower'), Nakheel Harbour and Tower complex, Dubai, United Arab Emirates; formerly named "Al Burj", a planned skyscraper by Nakheel PJSC
- Nakheel Mall, Palm Jumeirah, Dubai, United Arab Emirates; a shopping centre and entertainment complex
- Nakheel Villas, The World, Dubai, United Arab Emirates; a development in The World archipelago
- Nakheel (Dubai Metro), a rapid transit station in Dubai, near the Emirates Golf Course

=== Saudi Arabia ===
- Al Nakheel Beach, Jubail, Eastern Province, Saudi Arabia; a beach

==== Riyadh ====
- Al Nakheel Tower (Riyadh), Saudi Arabia (Arabic: برج النخيل, romanized: burj alnakhil, lit. 'Palm Tower'; Nakheel Tower); a skyscraper
- Nakheel, Diriyah, Riyadh, Saudi Arabia; a neighbourhood
- Jama’a Al-Nakheel (The Palm Mosque; Al Nakheel Mosque), King Saud University, Riyadh, Saudi Arabia
- Wahat al-Nakheel (Arabic: واحة النخيل, romanized: al-wāḥat al-naẖīl, lit. 'Palm Oasis'; Nakheel Oasis), al-Fouta, Riyadh, Saudi Arabia; a municipal garden

== Groups, organizations ==
- Nakheel Properties (Nakheel PJSC), a real estate development company based in Dubai, UAE
- Nakheel Aviation (callsign: NAKHEEL), a UAE airline; see List of airline codes (N)
- Nakheel Hotels, a subsidiary of Istithmar World, a state-run investment firm based in Dubai, UAE
- Bisha FC (formally known as Al-Nakheel), Bisha, Asir, Saudi Arabia; a soccer team

== See also ==
- Nakheel Harbour and Tower (Dubai Metro), a rapid transit station in Dubai, near Jumeirah Lake Towers and Dubai Marina
- Nakheel Harbour and Tower complex, a real estate development in Dubai
- Nakhlestan (disambiguation)
- Nakhla (disambiguation)
- Nakhl (disambiguation)
- Nakh (disambiguation)
- Palm (disambiguation)
- Palm tree (disambiguation)
