= Palmieri =

Palmieri is an Italian surname. Notable people with the surname include:

- Alessandro "Alex" Palmieri (born 1991), Italian singer, songwriter and LGBT activist
- Andrea Matteo Palmieri (1493–1537), Italian Roman Catholic bishop and cardinal
- Charlie Palmieri (1927–1988), Puerto Rican-American pianist and bandleader
- Claudio Palmieri (born 1977), Canadian musician, known professionally as Ethan Kath
- Cristoforo Palmieri (born 1939), Italian-born Albanian Roman Catholic bishop
- Davide Cocco Palmieri (1632–1711), Italian Roman Catholic Bishop of Malta
- Domenico Palmieri (1829–1909), Italian Jesuit scholastic theologian
- Donato Palmieri (c. 1550 – c. 1580), Italian painter of the late Renaissance period, also known as Donato da Formello
- Eddie Palmieri (1936–2025), Puerto Rican-American pianist and bandleader
- Edmund Louis Palmieri (1907–1989), United States district judge
- Emerson Palmieri (born 1994), Brazilian-born Italian footballer
- Ermanno Palmieri (1921–1982), Italian football player
- Federico Palmieri (born 1995), Italian football player
- Francesco Palmieri (footballer, born 1967) (born 1967), Italian footballer
- Francesco Palmieri (poet) (1659–1701), Italian poet and musician
- Fulvio Palmieri (1903–1966), Italian screenwriter
- Giuseppe Palmieri (athlete) (1902–1989), Italian high jumper and javelin thrower
- Giuseppe Palmieri (economist) (1721–1793), Italian economist and politician
- Giuseppe Palmieri (painter) (1674–1740), Italian painter of the late Baroque period
- Giovanni Palmieri (tennis) (1906–1982), Italian male tennis player
- Giovanni Palmieri dos Santos (born 1989), Brazilian professional footballer
- Irma Palmieri (1931–2015), Venezuelan actress and comedian
- Jennifer Palmieri (born 1966), former White House Director of Communications
- Jerry Palmieri (born 1958), American football strength and conditioning coach
- Julian Palmieri (born 1986), French professional footballer
- Kyle Palmieri (born 1991), American ice hockey player
- Luigi Palmieri (1807–1896), Italian physicist and meteorologist
- Mario Rubén García Palmieri (1927–2014), Spanish cardiologist
- Matteo Palmieri (1406–1475), Italian humanist and historian
- Paul Palmieri (Bickertonite) (1933–2020), American religious leader
- Paul Palmieri (CEO) (born 1970), American entrepreneur
- Pietro Palmieri, former Italian racing driver
- Riccardo Palmieri (born 1995), Italian footballer
- Rubi Lira Miranda Palmieri (born 1983), Brazilian female water polo player
- Silvio Palmieri (1957–2018), Canadian composer
- Stefano Palmieri (born 1964), Sammarinese politician, who twice served as a Captain Regent of San Marino
- Victor Palmieri (born 1930), American lawyer, real estate financier and businessman
- Wayan Palmieri (born 1977), American music video director, film editor and photographer

== Fictional characters ==
- Grace Palmieri
- Marco and Giuseppe Palmieri, characters in Gilbert and Sullivan's The Gondoliers

== See also ==
- Palmier (surname)
