= Palm (surname) =

Family name

Palm or Palms is a surname. Notable people with this surname include:

== Palm ==
- Anders Palm (born 1942), Swedish literary scholar and linguist
- Archibald Palm (1901–1966), South African cricketer
- August Palm (1849–1922), Swedish socialist activist
- Bert Palm (1915–1982), Australian lawn bowler
- Carl Magnus Palm (born 1965), Swedish author
- Charles E. Palm (1911–1996), American entomologist
- Christine Palm (born 1956), American politician
- Conny Palm, (1907–1951), Swedish electrical engineer and statistician
- Cortney Palm (born 1987), American actress and author
- David Palm (born 1958), Australian footballer
- Douglas Palm (born 1955), Swedish tennis player
- Eero Palm (born 1974), Estonian architect
- Enok Palm (1924–2012), Norwegian mathematician
- Erwin Walter Palm (1910–1988), German Latin American scholar, historian and writer
- Evy Palm (born 1942), Swedish long-distance runner
- Franz Palm (born 1948), Belgian economist
- Fredrik Palm (born 1974), Swedish windsurfer
- Göran Palm (1931–2016), Swedish writer
- Jacobo Palm (1887–1982), Curaçao-born composer
- Jan Gerard Palm (1831–1906), Curaçao-born composer
- Johan Palm (born 1992), Swedish singer
- Johann Philipp Palm (1768–1806), German bookseller executed during the Napoleonic Wars
- John Palm (1885–1925), Curaçao-born composer
- Leslie M. Palm (born 1944), American Marine Corps general
- Mati Palm (1942–2018), Estonian opera singer
- Philip J. Palm (1906–1959), American newspaper editor and politician
- Reet Palm (born 1959), Estonian rower and coach
- Rudolph Palm (1880–1950), Curaçao-born composer
- Siegfried Palm (1927–2005), German cellist
- Thede Palm (1907–1995), Swedish historian
- Valter Palm (1905–1994), Estonian boxer
- Veiko-Vello Palm (born 1971), Estonian brigadier general
- Viking Palm (1923–2009), Swedish wrestler
- Wolfgang Palm (born 1950), German musician

== Palms ==
- Francis Palms (1809–1886), American landholder

== See also ==
- Palme (surname)
- Palmer (surname)
- Palmerston (disambiguation)
