= Palmen =

Palmen is a surname. Notable persons with that name include:

- Annie Palmen (1926–2000), Dutch singer
- Connie Palmen (born 1955), Dutch author
- Erik Palmén (1898–1985), Finnish meteorologist
- Manfred Palmen (1945-2022), German politician
- Sandra Palmen (born 1980), Dutch politician

== See also ==
- 16168 Palmen, a minor planet
- Palme (surname)
