= Nakhlestan =

Nakhlestan or Nakhelstan (Persian: نخلستان) may refer to:

- Nakhelstan-e Galleh Dar, Fars Province, Iran
- Nakhelstan-e Mohr, Fars Province, Iran
- Nakhlestan Rural District (disambiguation)

== See also ==
- Nakheel
- Nakh (disambiguation)
- Stan (disambiguation)
