= Nakhlestan Rural District =

Nakhlestan Rural District (Persian: دهستان نخلستان) may refer to:

- Nakhlestan Rural District (Isfahan Province), Iran
- Nakhlestan Rural District (Kerman Province), Iran
- Nakhlestan Rural District (Tabas County), South Khorasan province, Iran

== See also ==
- Nakhlestan (disambiguation)
