= Palmier (surname) =

Palmier is a surname.

Notable people with the surname include:

- Remo Palmier (1923-2002), American jazz guitarist
- Pierre Palmier (d. 1555), archbishop of Vienne
- Jean-Michel Palmier (1944–1998), French philosopher and art historian
- Leslie Hugh Palmier (b. 1924), British sociologist

== See also ==
- Palmieri (surname)
- Palmier (disambiguation)
