= Paralemmin =

Protein-coding gene in humans

PALM

Identifiers
- Aliases: PALM, paralemmin, PALM1
- External IDs: OMIM: 608134; MGI: 1261814; GeneCards: PALM

Gene location (Human)
Chr.	Chromosome 19 (human)
Band	19p13.3	Start	708,935 bp
Band	19p13.3	End	748,329 bp

Gene location (Mouse)
Chr.	Chromosome 10 (mouse)
Band	10 C1|10 39.72 cM	Start	79,629,406 bp
Band	10 C1|10 39.72 cM	End	79,656,730 bp
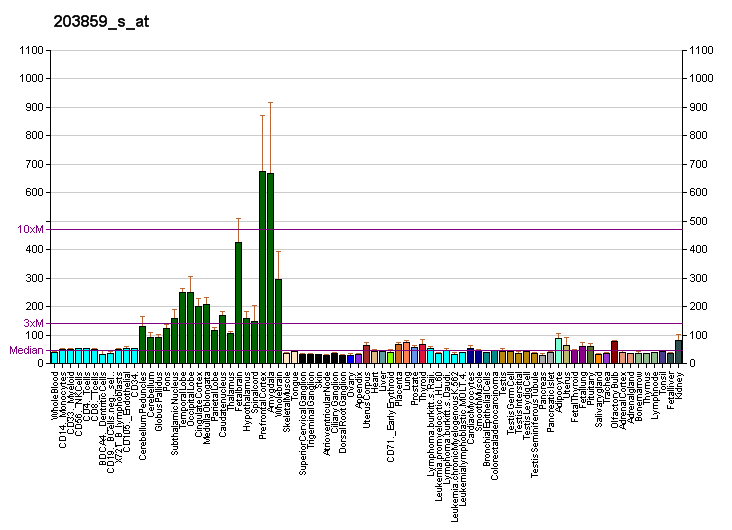
RNA expression pattern
Bgee	Human / Mouse (ortholog); Top expressed in: amygdala; right frontal lobe; nucleus accumbens; cingulate gyrus; anterior cingulate cortex; caudate nucleus; putamen; prefrontal cortex; ganglionic eminence; Brodmann area 9 / Top expressed in: entorhinal cortex; perirhinal cortex; dentate gyrus of hippocampal formation granule cell; superior frontal gyrus; primary visual cortex; CA3 field; granulocyte; ventricular zone; neural tube; right kidney; More reference expression data
BioGPS	More reference expression data
Gene ontology
Molecular function	D3 dopamine receptor binding; protein binding
Cellular component	cytoplasm; cell projection; intracellular membrane-bounded organelle; membrane; filopodium; plasma membrane; dendritic spine; integral component of plasma membrane; dendrite membrane; axon; apicolateral plasma membrane; dendrite; basolateral plasma membrane; dendritic spine membrane; neuron spine; nucleus; filopodium membrane; postsynaptic density; cytoplasmic vesicle; intrinsic component of the cytoplasmic side of the plasma membrane
Biological process	protein localization; negative regulation of adenylate cyclase activity; cytoskeleton organization; synapse maturation; regulation of cell shape; negative regulation of dopamine receptor signaling pathway; cellular response to electrical stimulus; positive regulation of filopodium assembly; protein localization to plasma membrane; adenylate cyclase-inhibiting G protein-coupled receptor signaling pathway
Sources:Amigo / QuickGO
Orthologs
Databases	NCBI: entry; OMA: entry
Species	Human	Mouse
Entrez	5064	18483
Ensembl	ENSG00000099864	ENSMUSG00000035863
UniProt	O75781	Q9Z0P4
RefSeq (mRNA)	NM_001040134; NM_002579	NM_001161747; NM_023128
RefSeq (protein)	NP_001035224; NP_002570	NP_001155219; NP_075617
Location (UCSC)	Chr 19: 0.71 – 0.75 Mb	Chr 10: 79.63 – 79.66 Mb
PubMed search
- Wikidata
View/Edit Human	View/Edit Mouse

Paralemmin is a protein that in humans is encoded by the PALM gene.

This gene encodes a member of the paralemmin protein family. Other members of this family include CAP-23, GAP-43, MARCKS, and MacMARCKS. The product of this gene is a prenylated and palmitoylated phosphoprotein that associates with the cytoplasmic face of plasma membranes and is implicated in plasma membrane dynamics in neurons and other cell types. Several alternatively spliced transcript variants have been identified, but the full-length nature of only two transcript variants has been determined.
