= Nakhla (name) =

Name, short for the Arabic version of Michael

Nakhla is a short cut for the Arabic version of Michael (Mikhail) in upper Egypt (south of Egypt). So some Mikhails in upper Egypt are referred to as Nakhla.

Nakhla is also an Arabic word for palm tree.

== People ==
- Adel Nakhla, American-Egyptian civilian translator
- Ahmed Nakhla (born 1971), Egyptian footballer
- Margaret Nakhla (1908–1977), Egyptian painter
- Melanie Nakhla (born 1988), British singer
- Michel Nakhla, Canadian professor and researcher
