= Palm Trees Park =

Park in Pontevedra (Spain)

Parque das Palmeiras Parque de las Palmeras
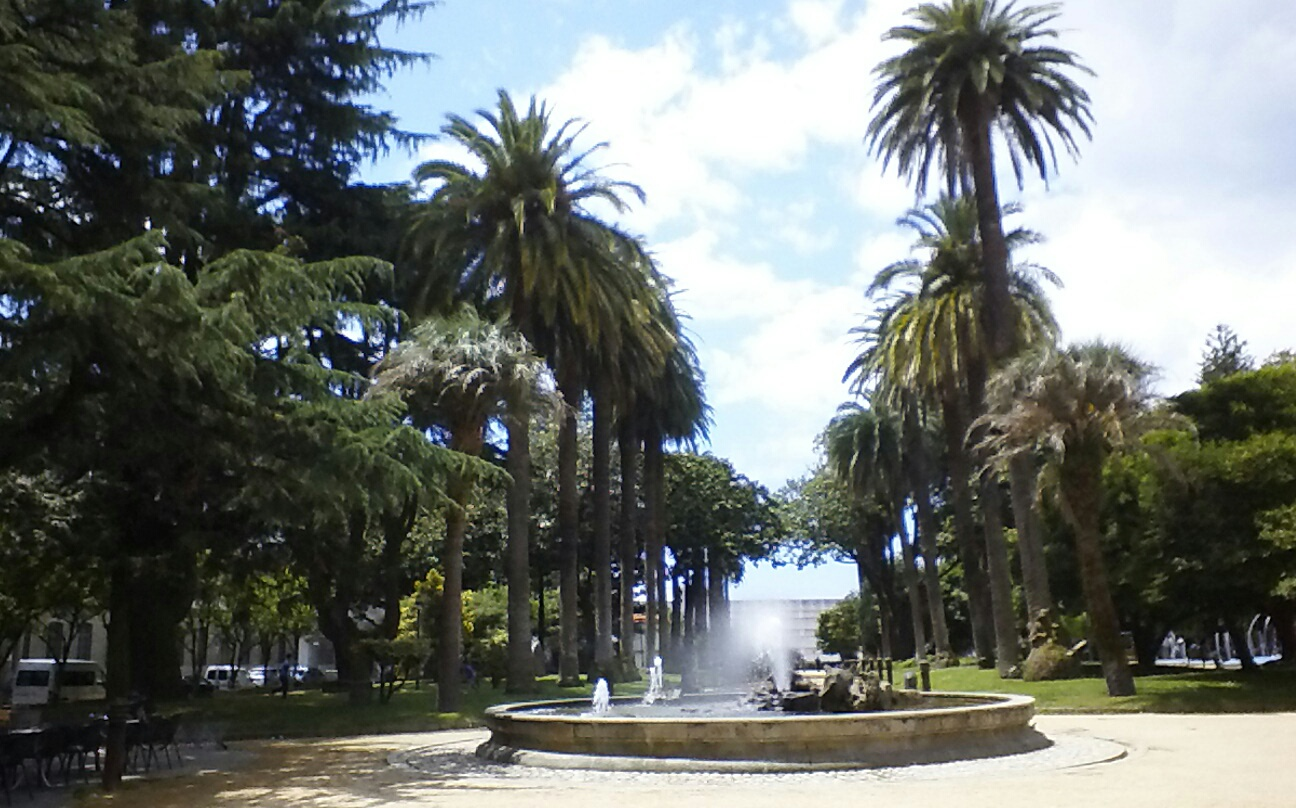
- Central Palm Trees alley
- Interactive map of Parque das Palmeiras; Parque de las Palmeras
- Location: Pontevedra, Spain
- Coordinates: 42.429761°N 8.647623°W
- Area: 0.023 km^{2} (4.94 acres)
- Created: 1902
- Operator: Municipality of Pontevedra
- Status: Public park

The Palm Trees Park, also known simply as Las Palmeras or As Palmeiras, is a public park in the heart of Pontevedra in Spain. It is the most representative and emblematic green area in the city centre, together with the Alameda de Pontevedra.

== History ==
The 19th-century project to enlarge the old St. Joseph's field by the architect Alejandro Sesmero, which was not finally carried out, was the basis for the development of a park which over the years would become the Palm Trees Park.

In the 1870s, the Gran Vía avenue (now Gran Vía de Montero Ríos) was built to link the Alameda de Pontevedra to the Fairground.

The first section that began to take shape in the new park corresponds to the present Columbus gardens. These lands were previously part of the orchard garden of the San Domingo convent. At the end of the 19th century, Alejandro Sesmero designed a garden located at the entrance to the Alameda de Pontevedra where exotic and unique species were planted.

Throughout the 20th century, the area of the current Palm Trees Park was subject to continuous changes, both in terms of landscaping and the elements it contained.

The area of the current Vincenti gardens was used for the cattle fair until 1896 and was known as the Fairground. At the beginning of the 20th century, the deputy mayor, Andrés Landín, was the promoter of the landscaping of this Fairground, which was originally conceived as a large square dedicated to Eduardo Vincenti Reguera, the deputy representing Pontevedra in the Spanish Parliament from 1886 to 1923. The configuration of this square, which ended up being a park, was very slow.

On 9 June 1902, the gardener Francisco Pousada Fernández signed a project with the City Council for the development of this Vincenti square into a garden. Andrés Landín, in turn, promoted the purchase of trees and plants for the garden, which was planned for December 1902 and January 1903.

In 1924 the wooden circus theatre authorised in 1900 by the town council in front of the Villa Pilar mansion disappeared and the space was turned into a garden. In 1929, the pond that Sesmero had originally located at the entrance to the Alameda was moved to the Palm Trees Park. Later, in 1959, the Monument to the Navigators was inaugurated in the western sector of the Vincenti gardens.

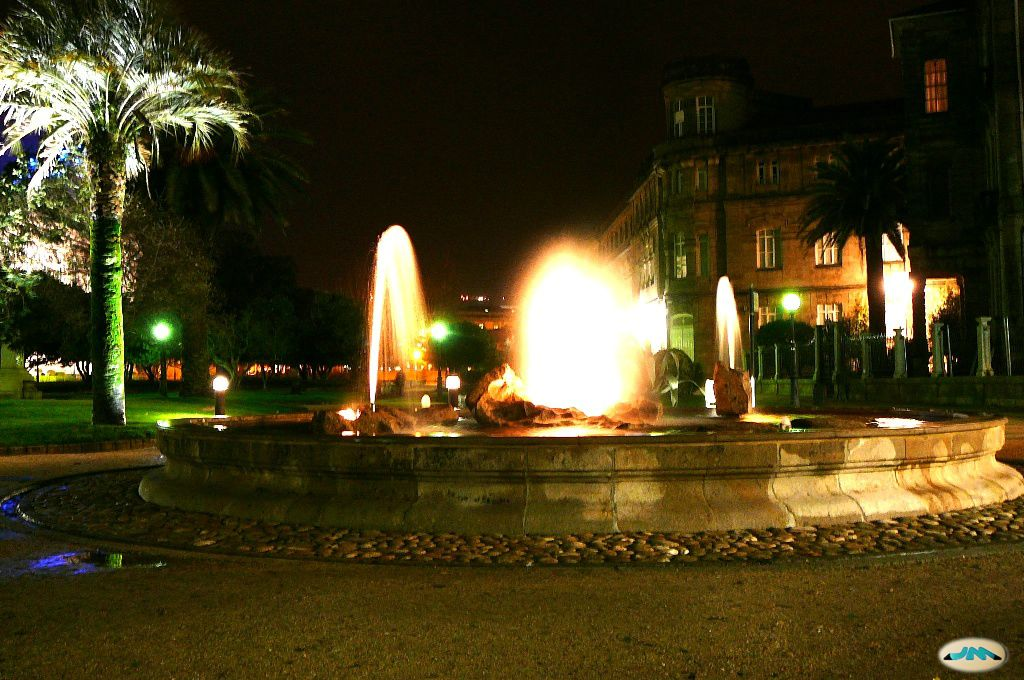
Fountain with water jets at night

In the early 1980s, new aviaries for exotic birds such as peacocks and large circular cages for animals such as monkeys were installed in the Vincenti gardens.

In 1985, the park adopted its present appearance after a final renovation. According to the project, the gardens were transformed into an English-style park with large open areas, and much of the vegetation was replaced by lawns bordered by small granite borders.

In 2007 the aviaries and cages that had been empty for years were removed and replaced by the expansion of the children's play area. The ducks also disappeared from the duck pond at one end of the park.

Also in 2007, a new lighting system was installed to highlight 43 trees by means of 50 spotlights embedded in the ground, which provide vertical light and especially highlight the three cedars of Lebanon declared singular trees by the Galician Government, as well as the palms in the central avenue of the park.

== Description ==
The park has an area of approximately 23,000 m². It is bounded by the large buildings of Gran Vía de Montero Ríos to the north, by Avenida Reina Victoria-Eugenia to the west, by the provincial branch of the Ministry of Defence to the south and by Marquis of Riestra street to the east, where the Villa Pilar mansion is located.

The Palm Trees Park includes a central alley flanked by palm trees, the Vincenti Gardens and the Columbus Gardens.

In the central area there is an alley flanked by tall Canary Island palms that runs in a straight line from General Gutiérrez Mellado Street to Reina Victoria-Eugenia avenue. Around this central alley are the Vincenti Gardens and, a little further north, the Columbus Gardens, which surround three large 19th-century buildings whose facades face the Gran Vía de Montero Ríos: the Valle-Inclán High School, inaugurated in 1927, the Palace of the Provincial Council of Pontevedra, inaugurated in 1890, and the building of the Escuela Normal de Artes y Oficios (now the Provincial Council's administrative building), inaugurated in 1899.

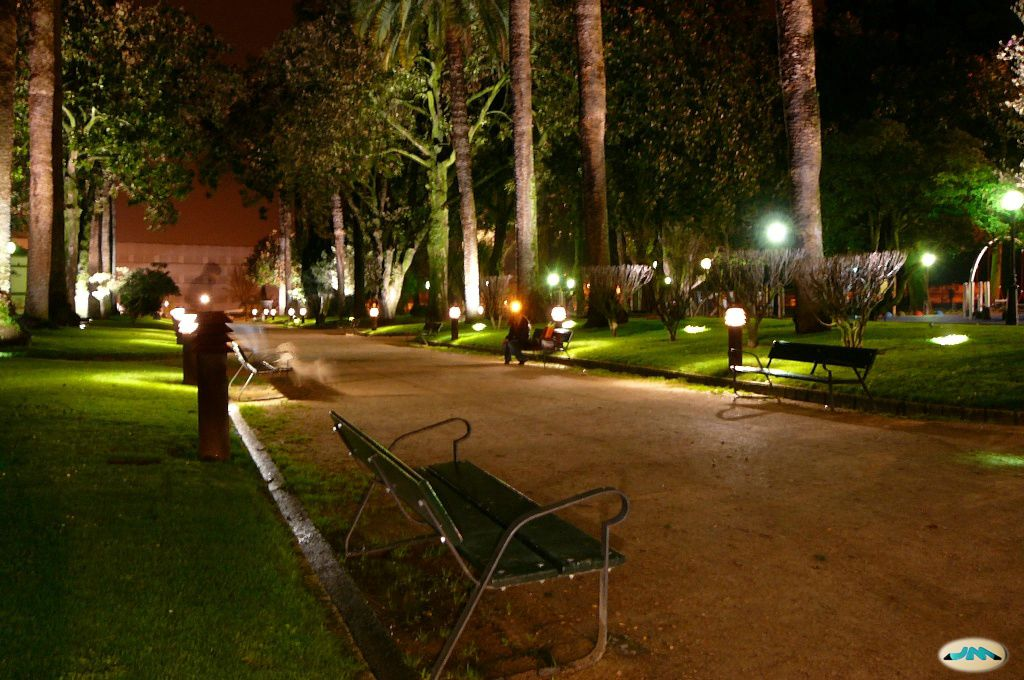
Central alley of the park at night

The gardens of Vincenti have two axes that divide them into four quarters: the palm alley (west-east) and the alley that was originally flanked by magnolias, which connects the Palace of the Provincial Council of Pontevedra to the old school (now the Provincial Defence Office) (north-south). The gardens, lined with small paths, are occupied by various species of flowering trees such as magnolia and camellia. Other notable trees are the cedars of Lebanon, the Himalayan cedar, the holly and the Umbrian Yews.

The gardens of Columbus have small marble pools with bronze statues of cherubs inside. The white marble statue of Christopher Columbus, which gives the gardens their name, was made by Juan Sanmartín y Senra in 1892 for the Lourizán palace and installed in the gardens in 1959.

At the eastern end of the central alley of the Palms is a granite pool called El Pilón with a round half-rock with irregular holes and water jets inside. Near the Reina Victoria Eugenie avenue is a pond popularly known as the Duck pond. It houses miniature houses and was renovated in 2016. To the north of the Palm Trees alley is a children's playground with slides, swings, and other games.

At the western end of the park, behind the administrative building of the Pontevedra Provincial Council, is the monument to the Navigators, inaugurated in 1959. The slope towards Queen Victoria Eugenie Avenue is separated from the park by a balustrade from which the sea and the Ria de Pontevedra can be seen. To the south, closing off the garden area, the building that currently houses the provincial office of the Ministry of Defence (former primary school) was built between 1889 and 1892.

At the south-eastern end of the park is the emblematic Café Blanco y Negro (which replaced the Café Las Navas at the time), one of the oldest in Pontevedra, founded in 1944, and which obtained the concession to build its famous terrace attached to the park in 1950. At the south-western end of the park there is a circular dovecote decorated with a fresco, renovated in 2017.

== Gallery ==
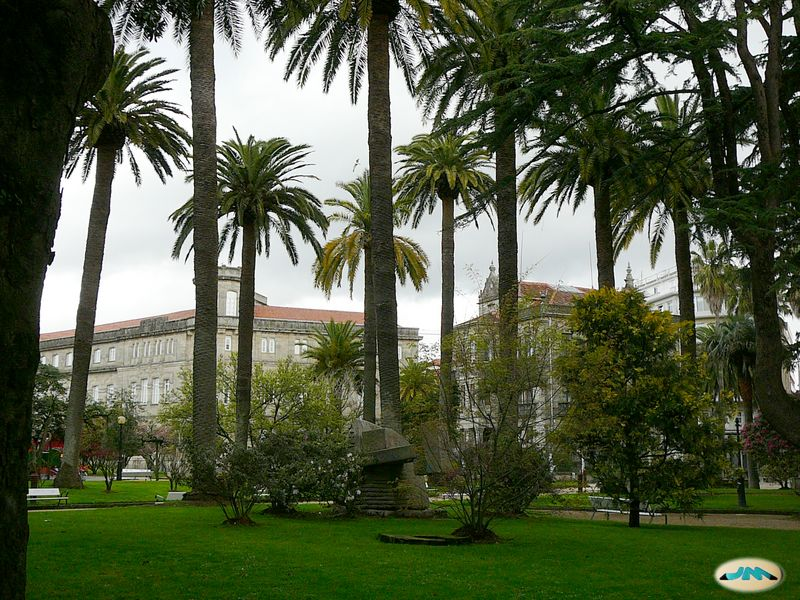
Palm Trees

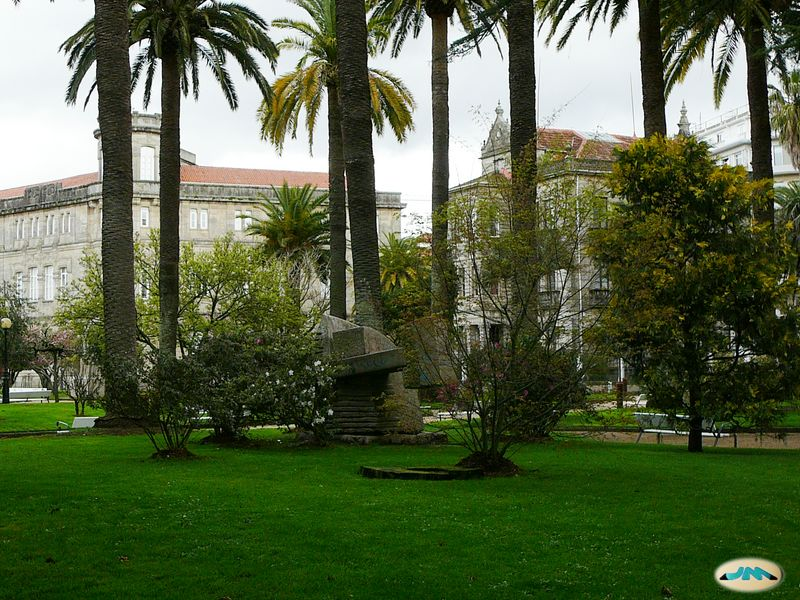
Vincenti Gardens

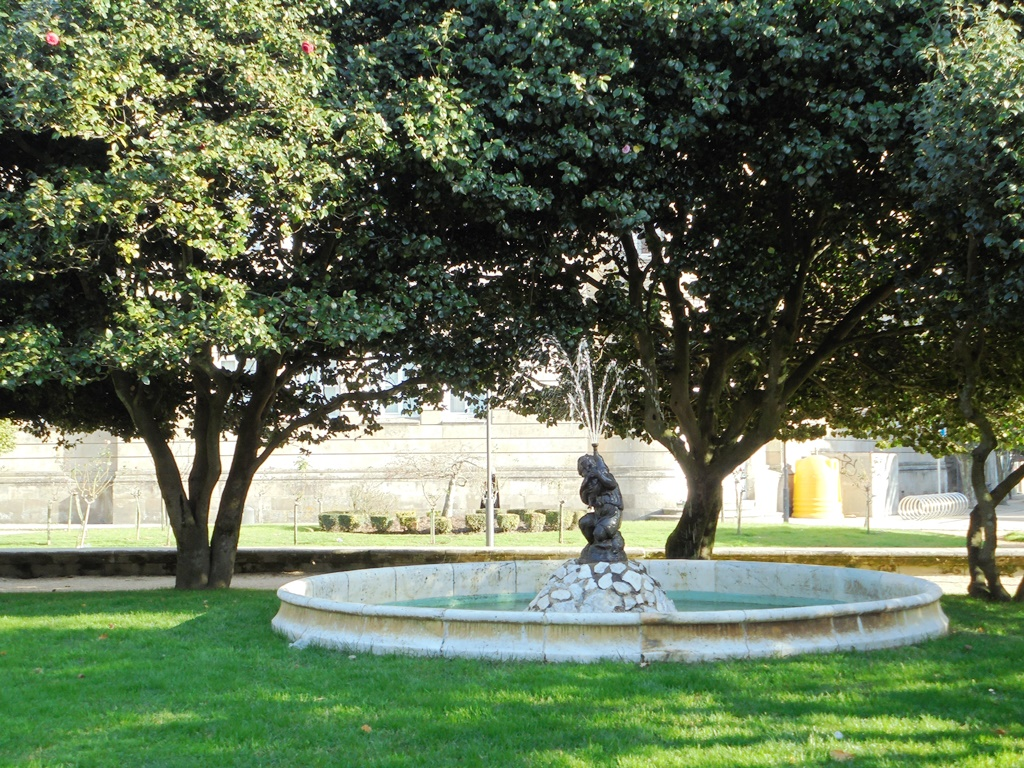
Pond

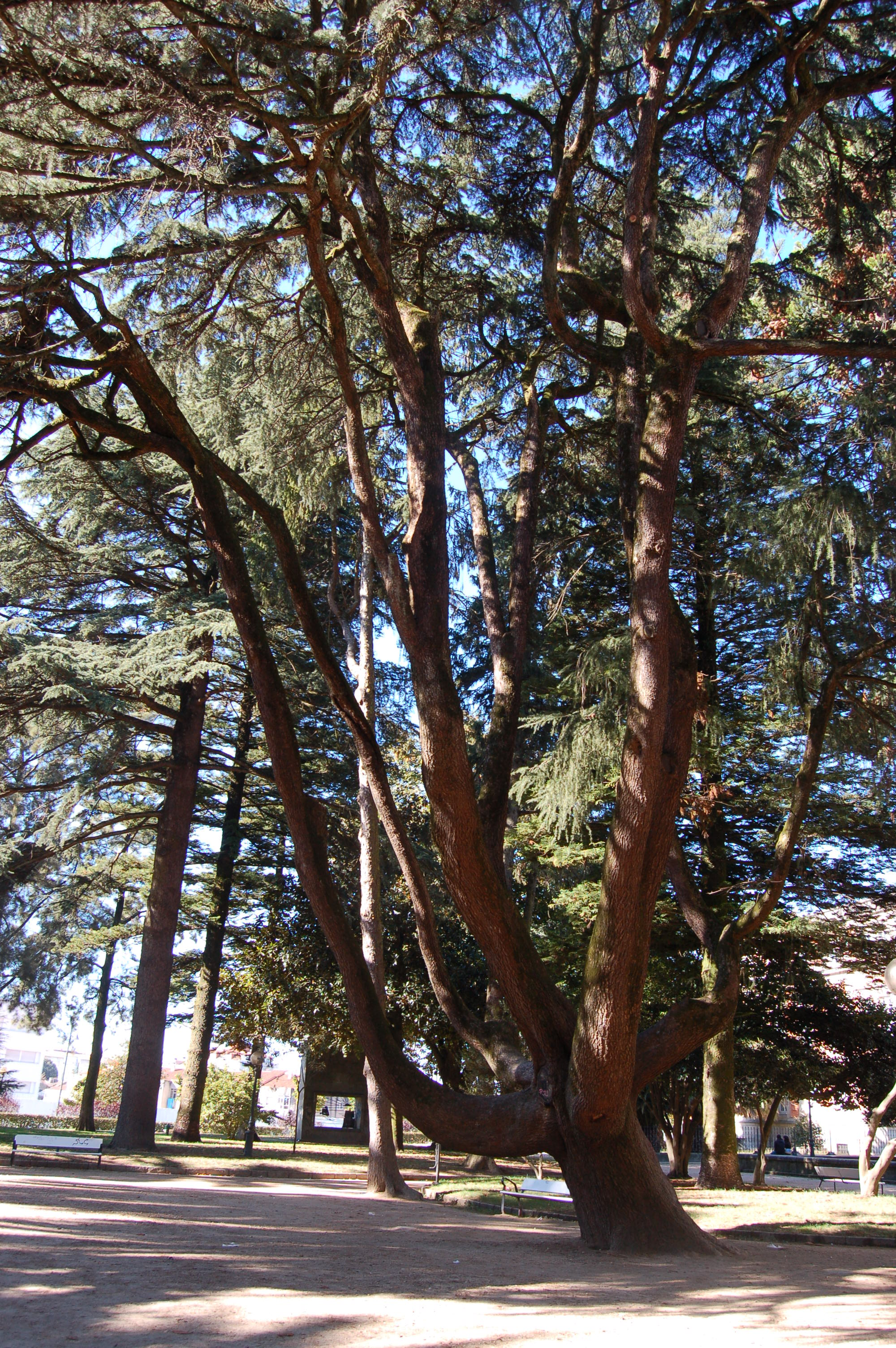
Lebanon cedar

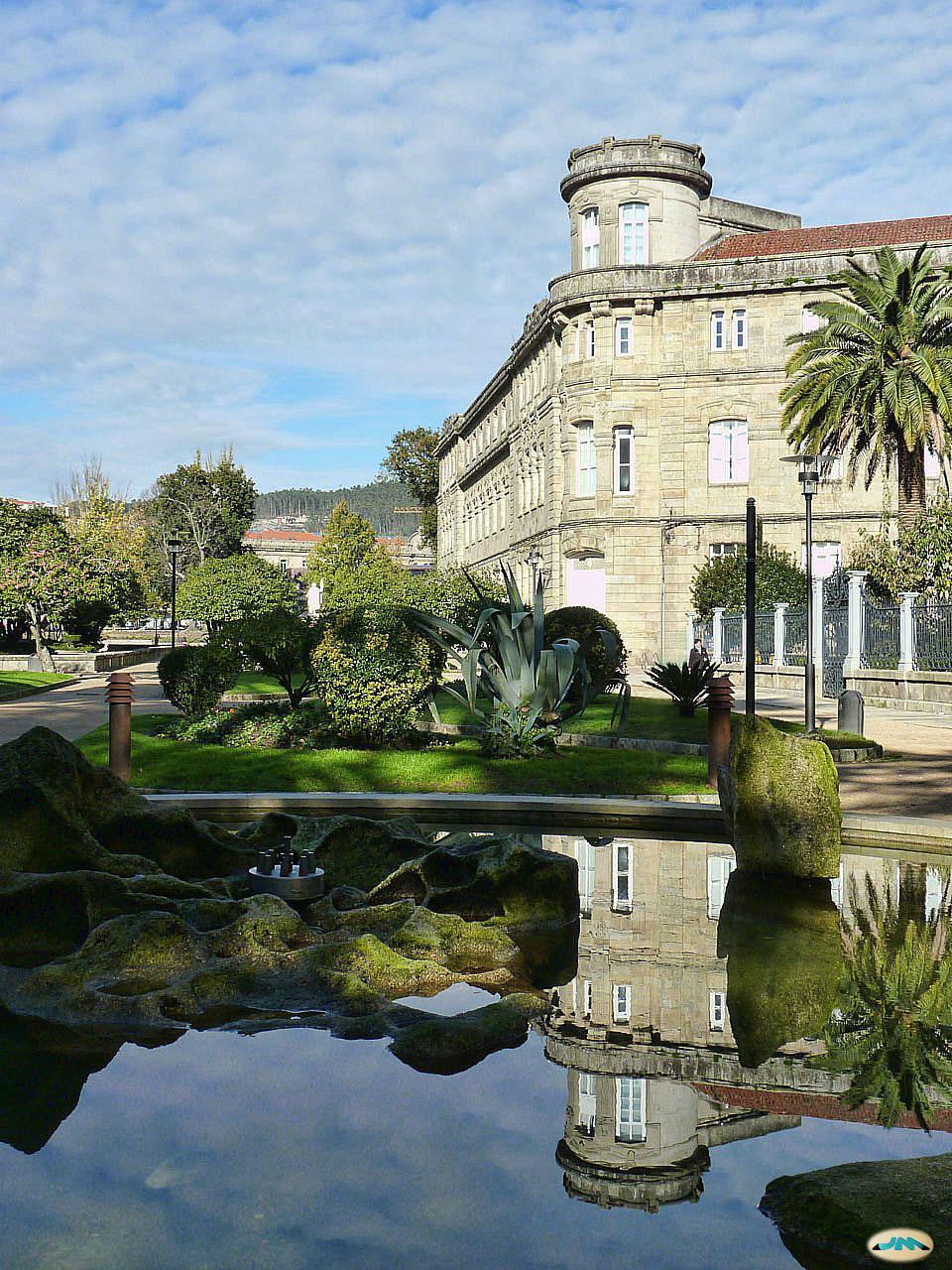
Valle-Inclán High School

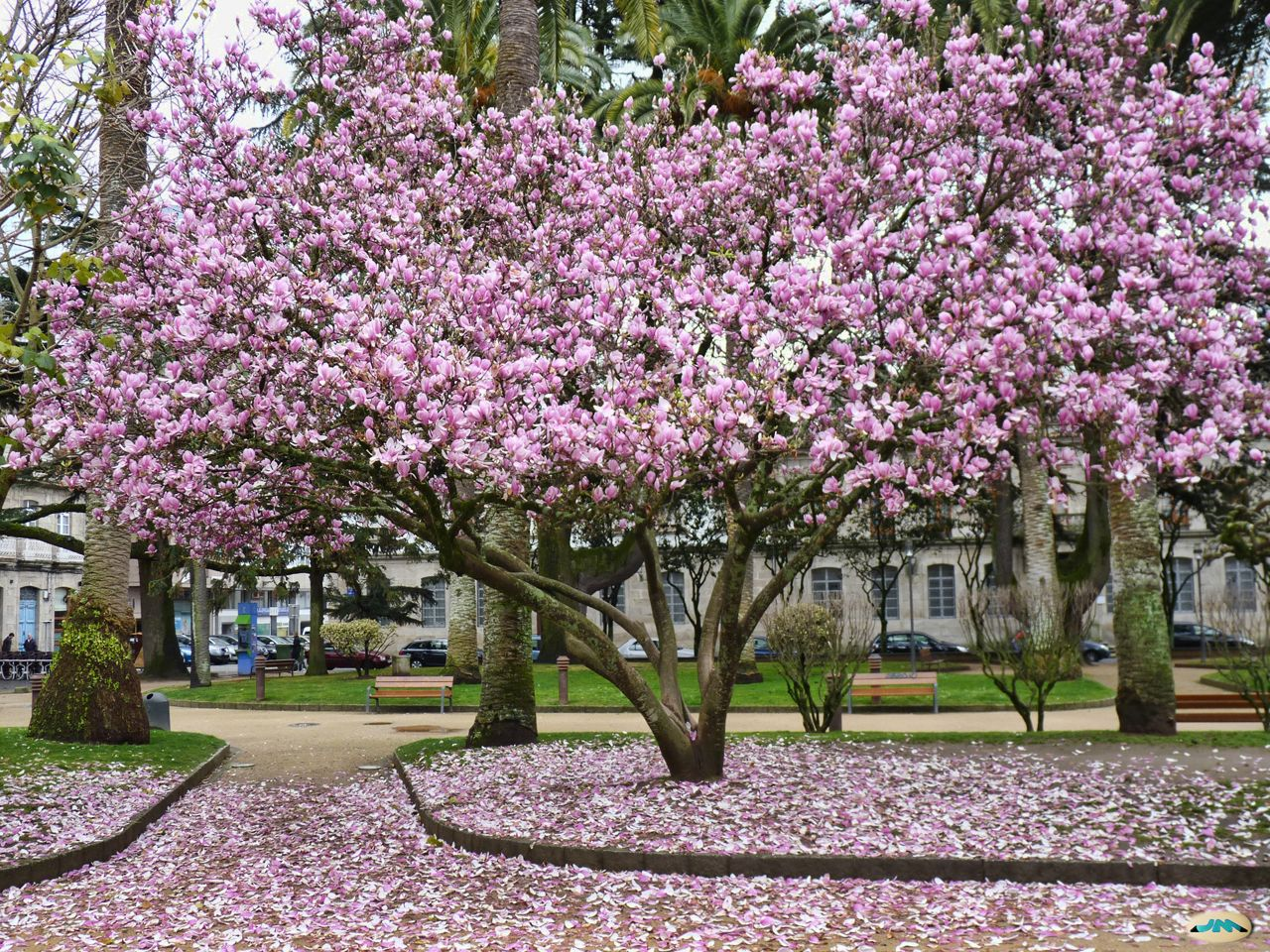
Magnolia

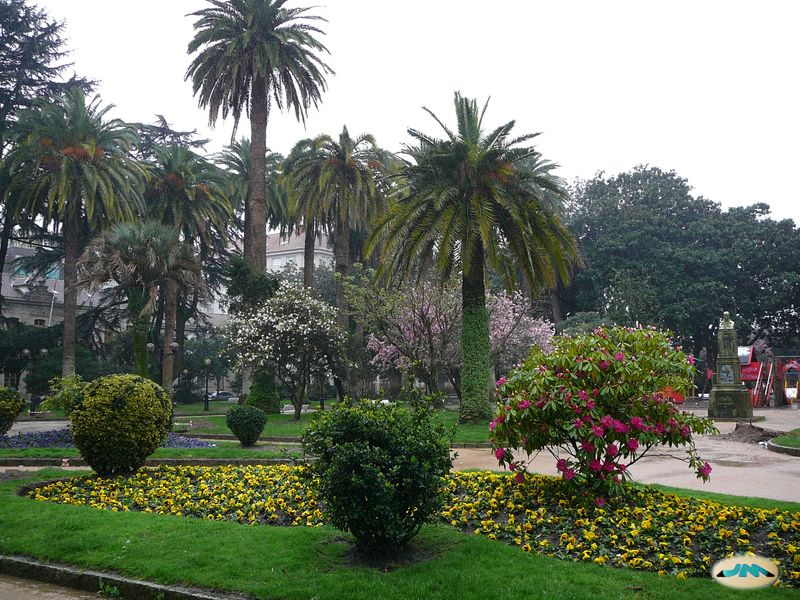
Vincenti Gardens

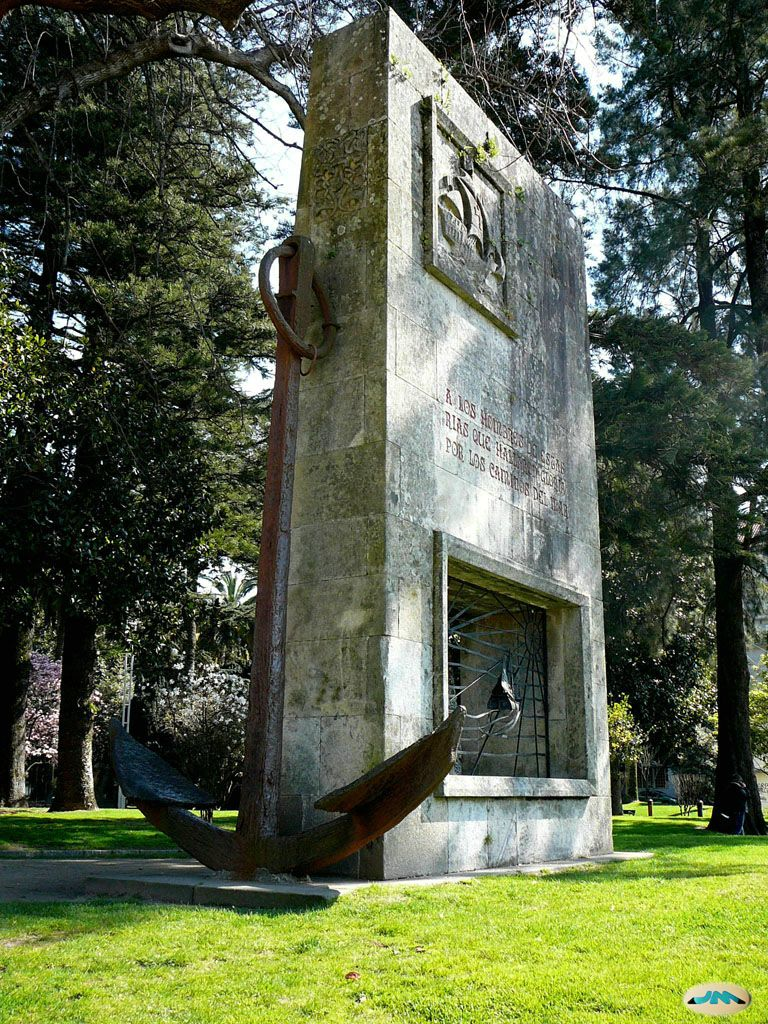
Monument to navigators

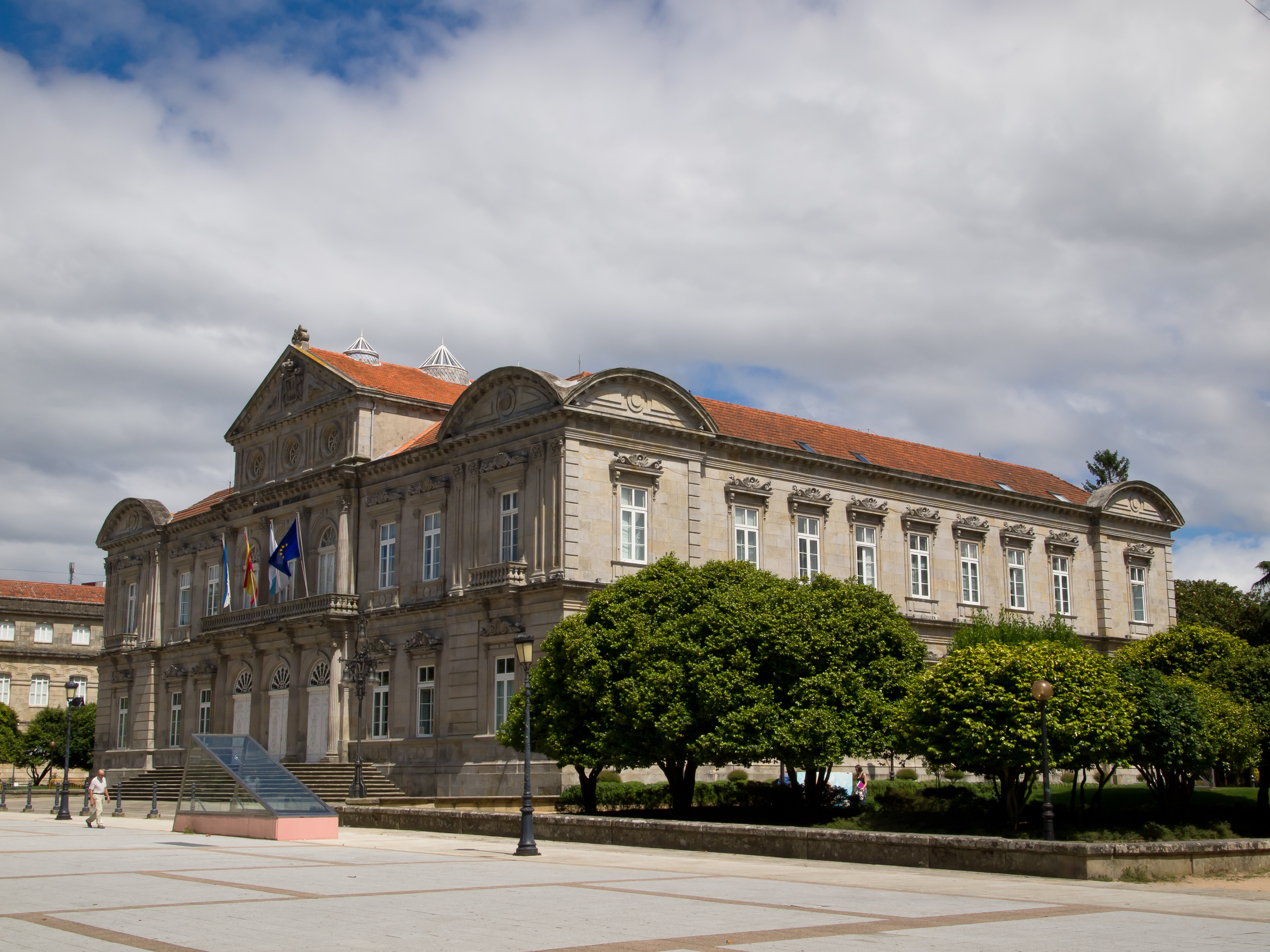
Palace of the Provincial Council of Pontevedra

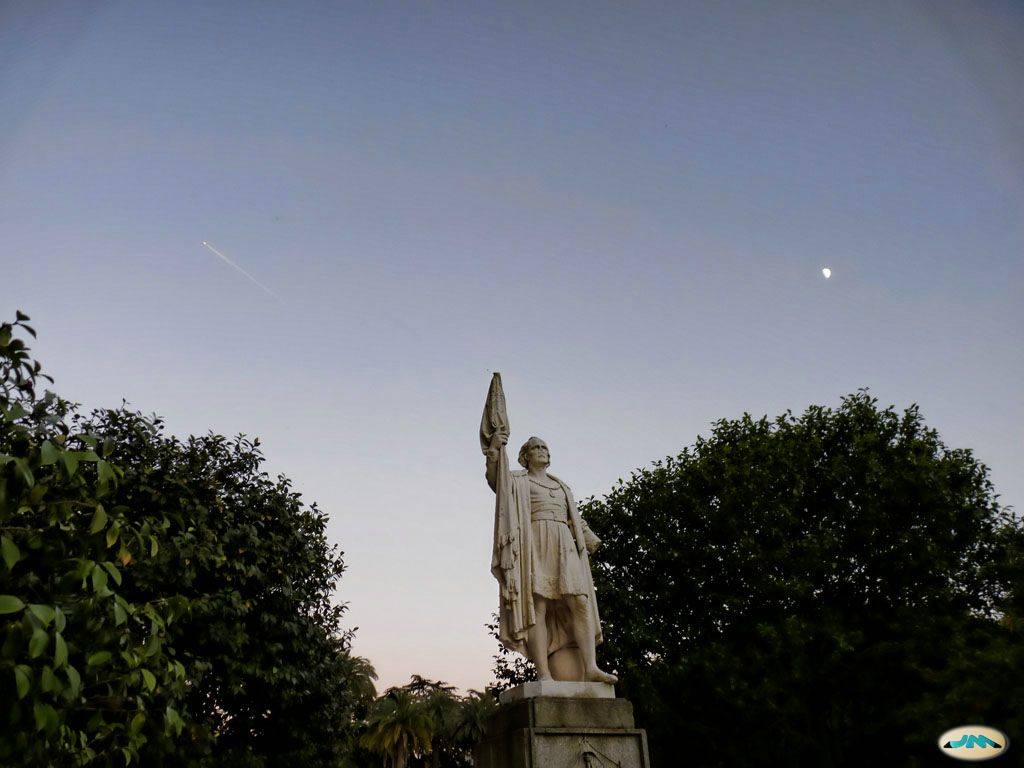
Columbus statue

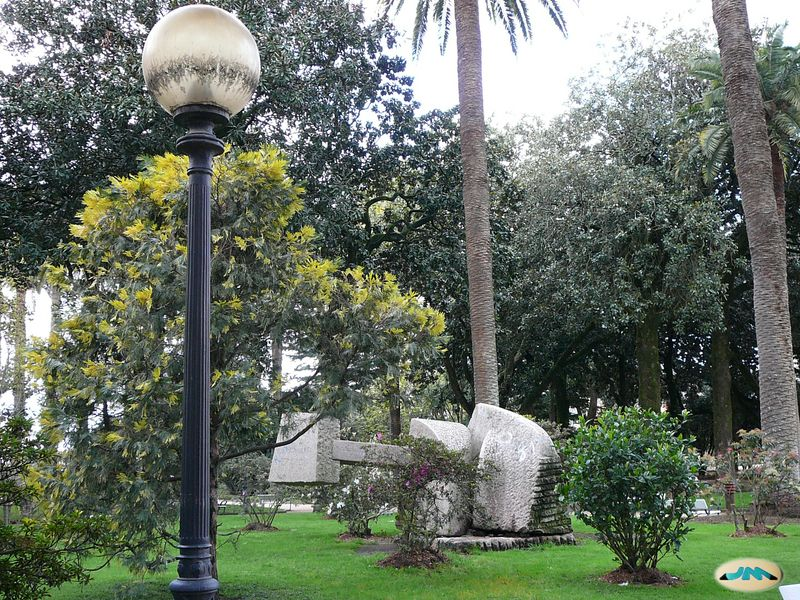
Vincenti Gardens

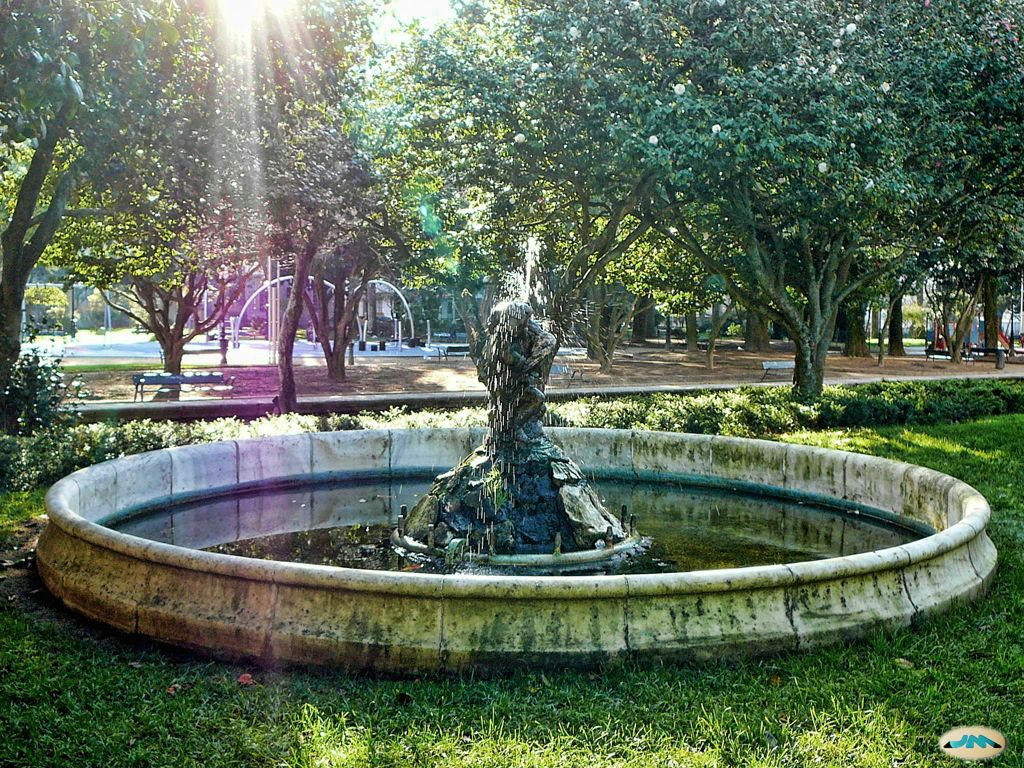
Ponds

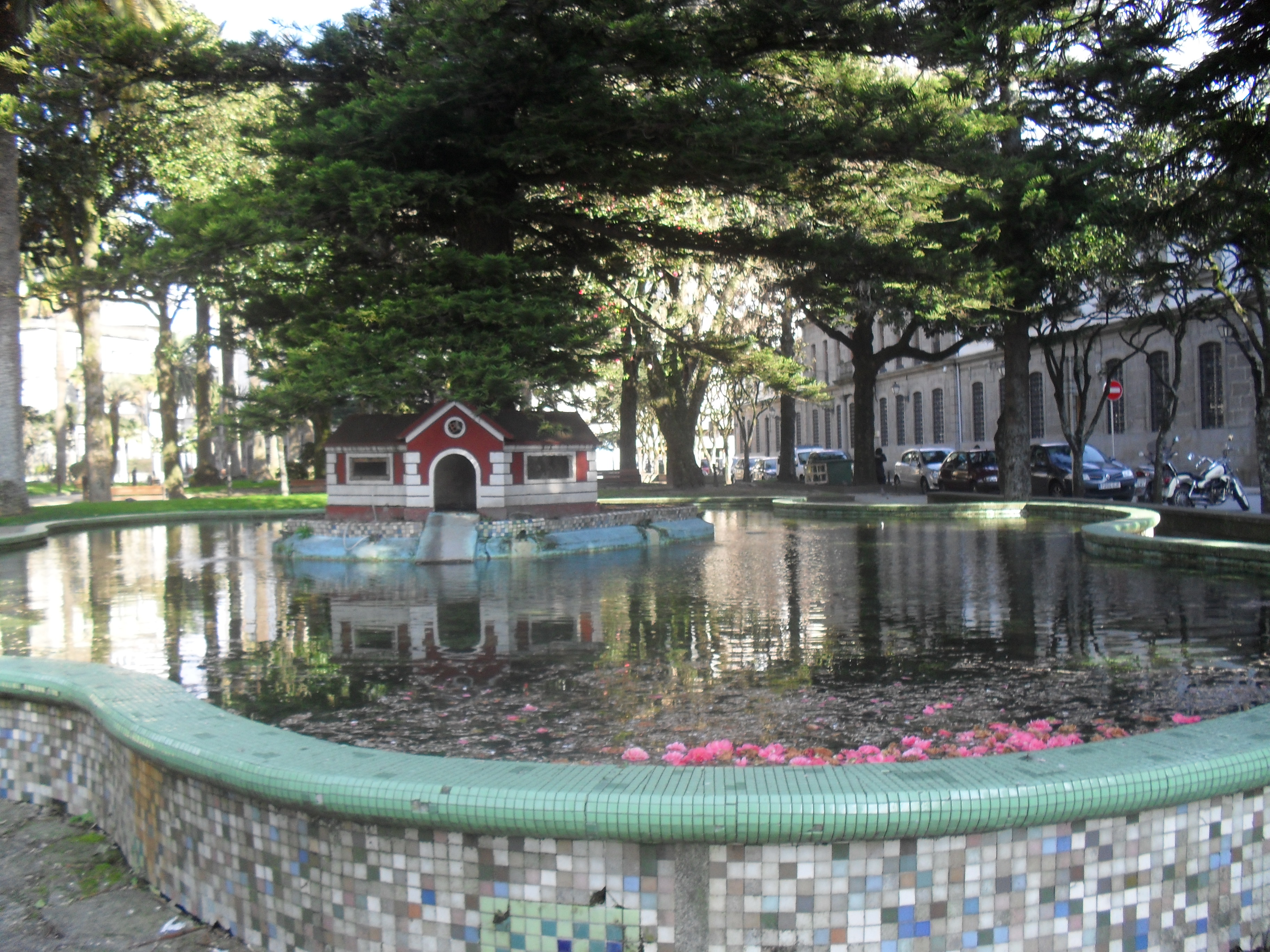
Ducks pond

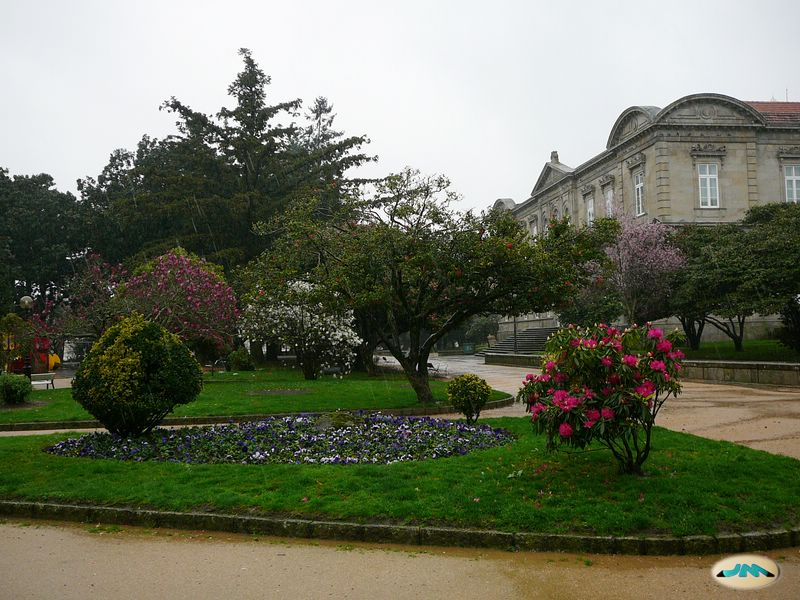
Vincenti Gardens

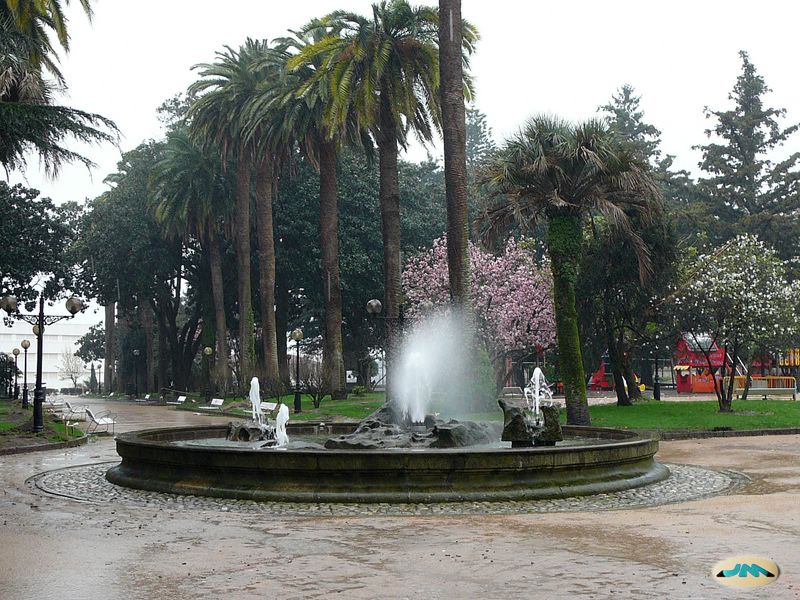
Pond and Palm Trees alley

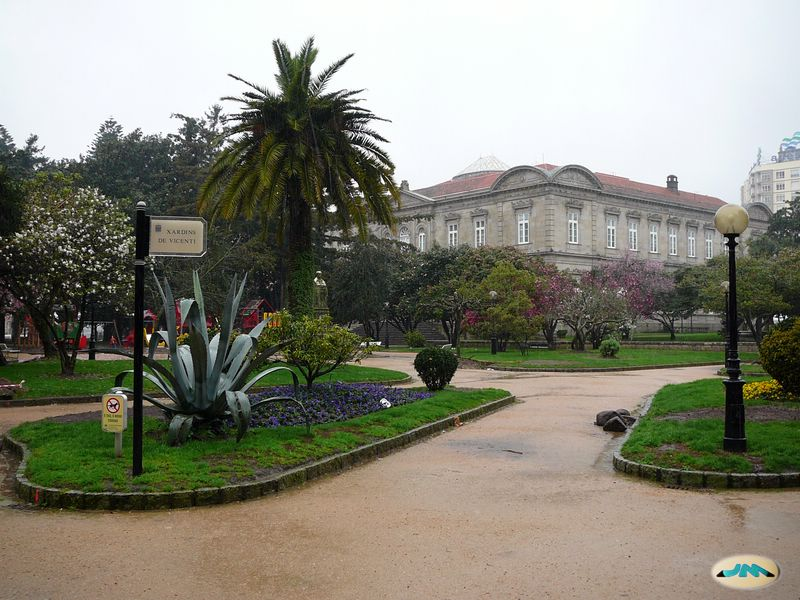
Vincenti Gardens

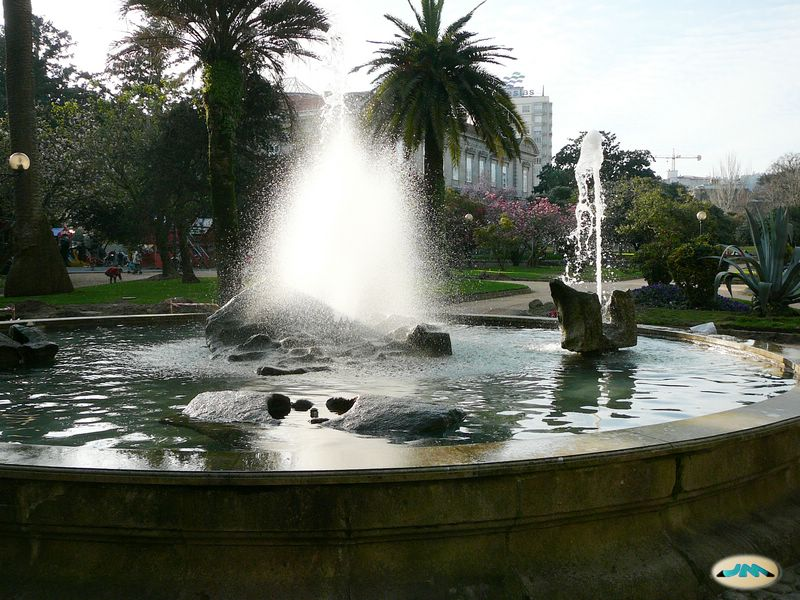
Pond called El Pilón

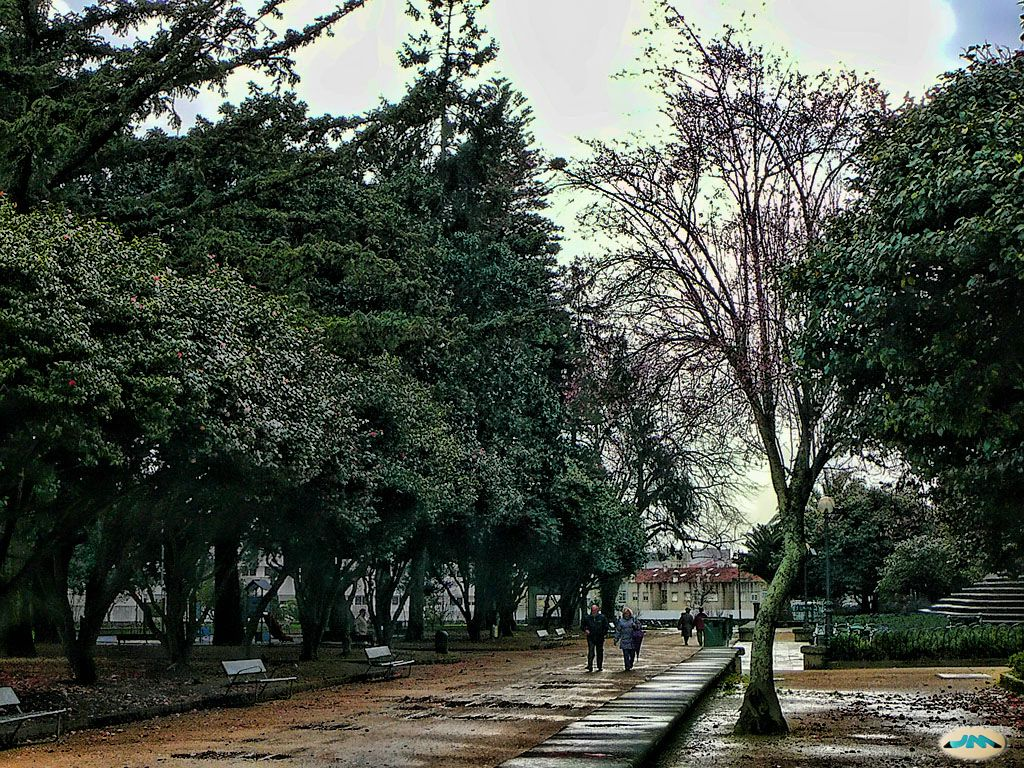
Vincenti Gardens

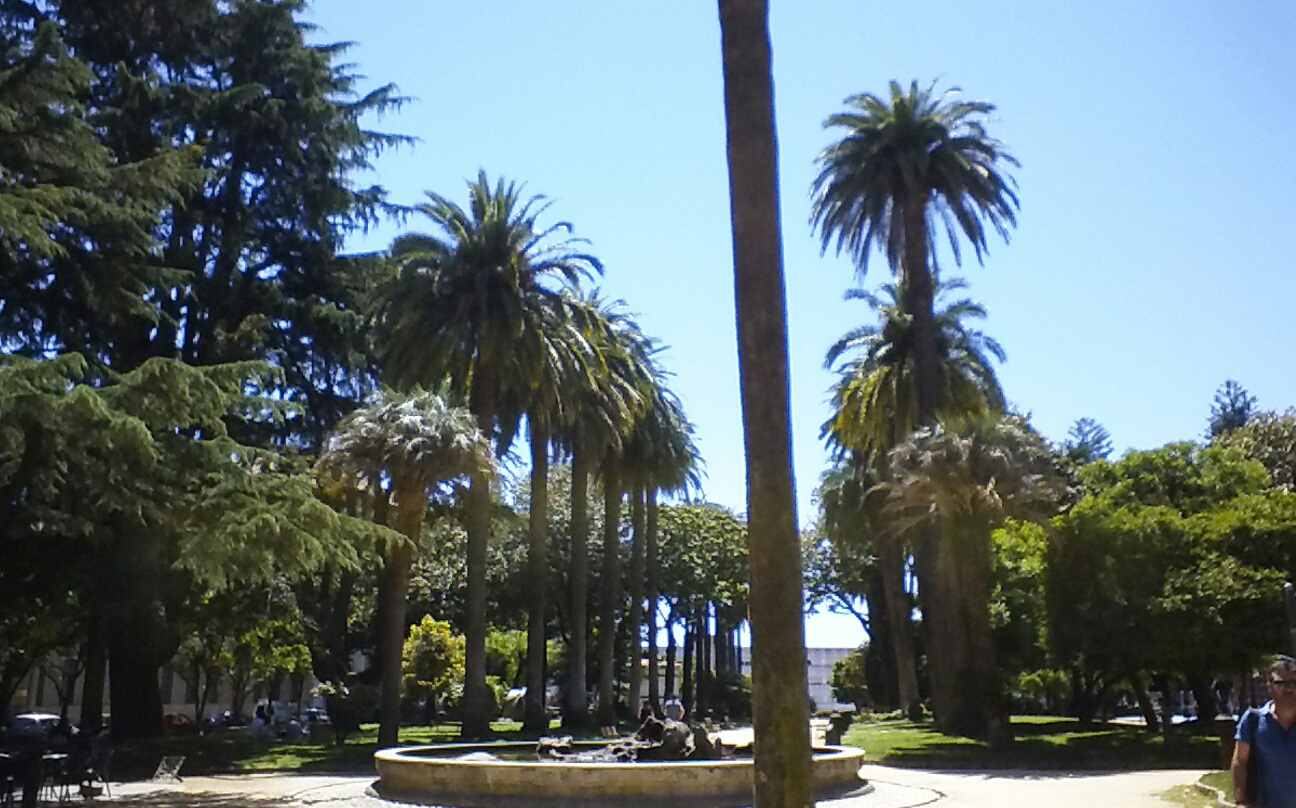
Central Palm Trees alley

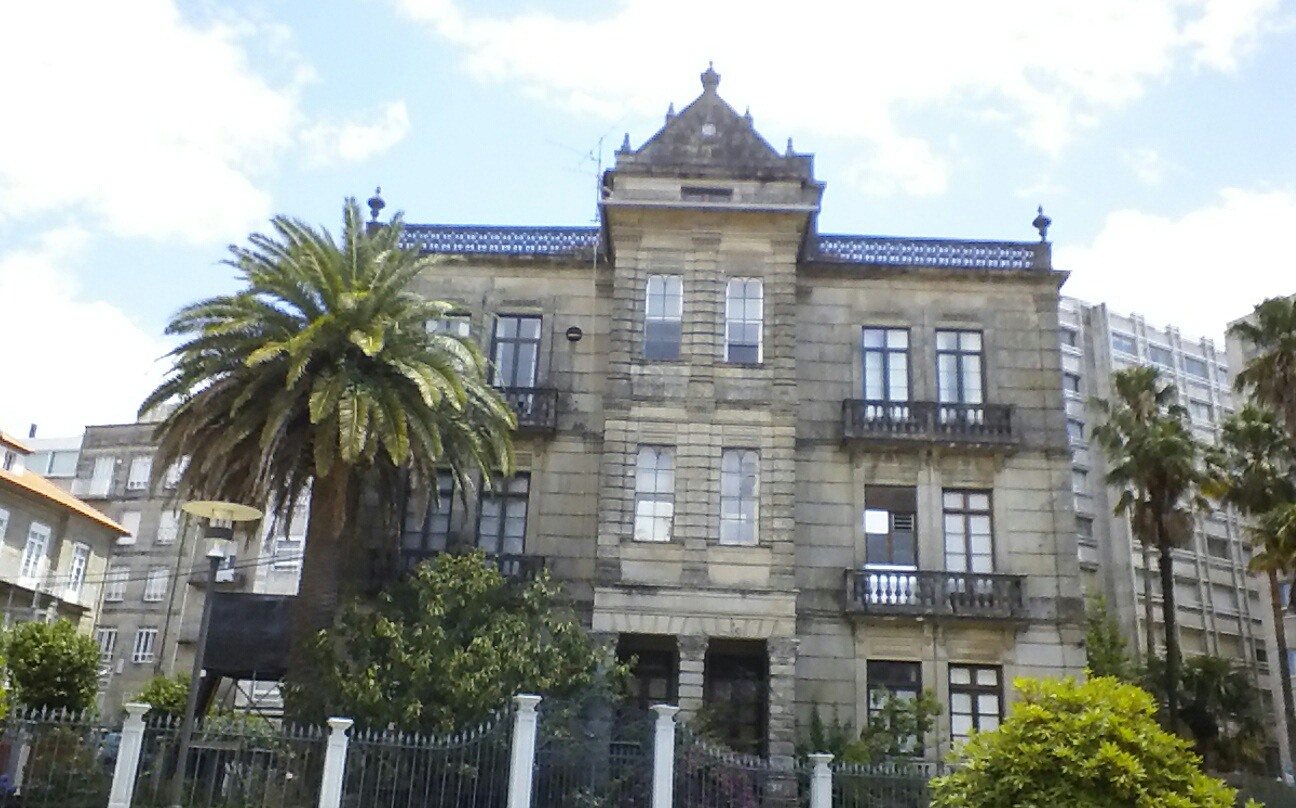
Villa Pilar mansion

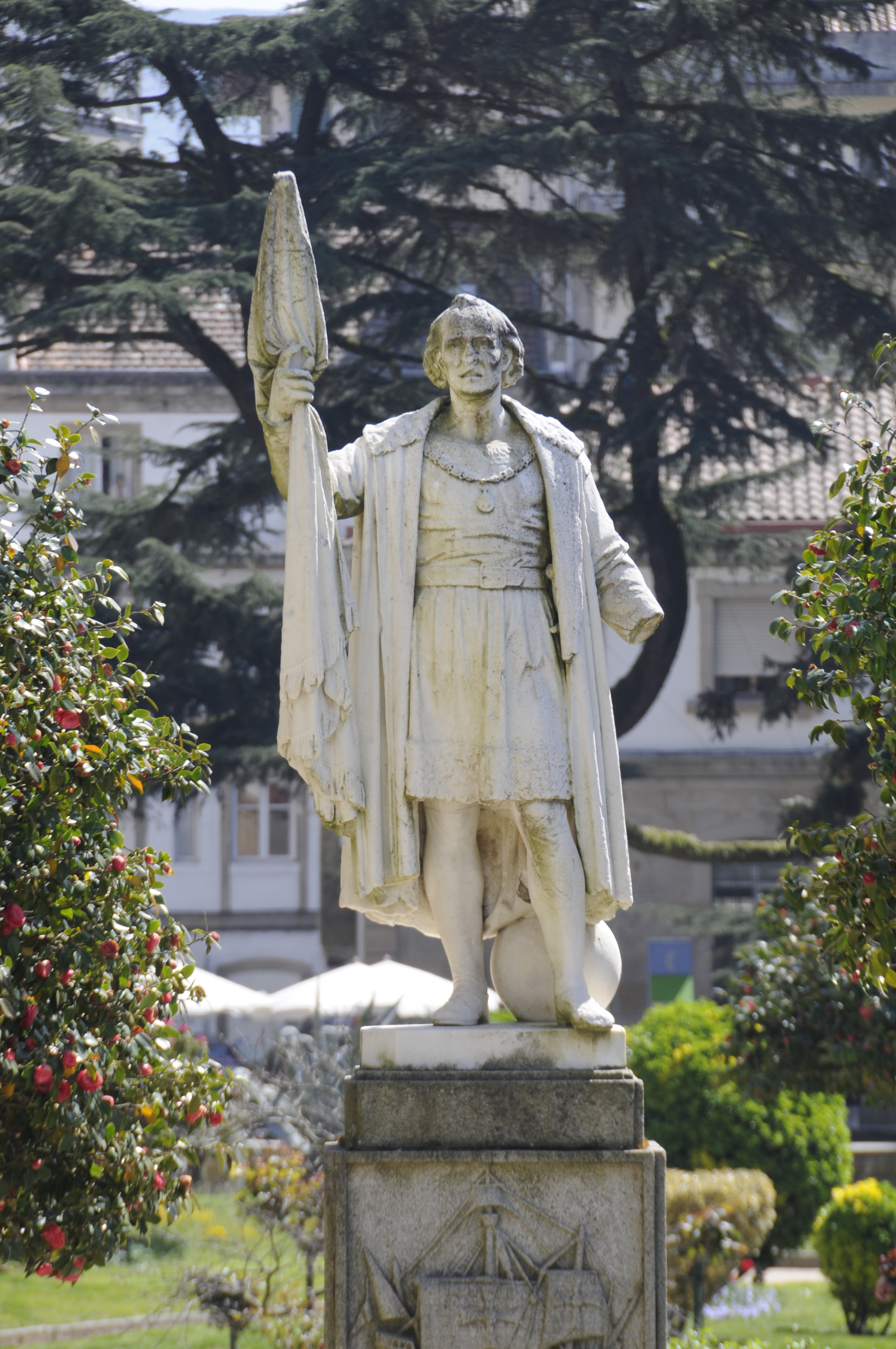
Columbus statue

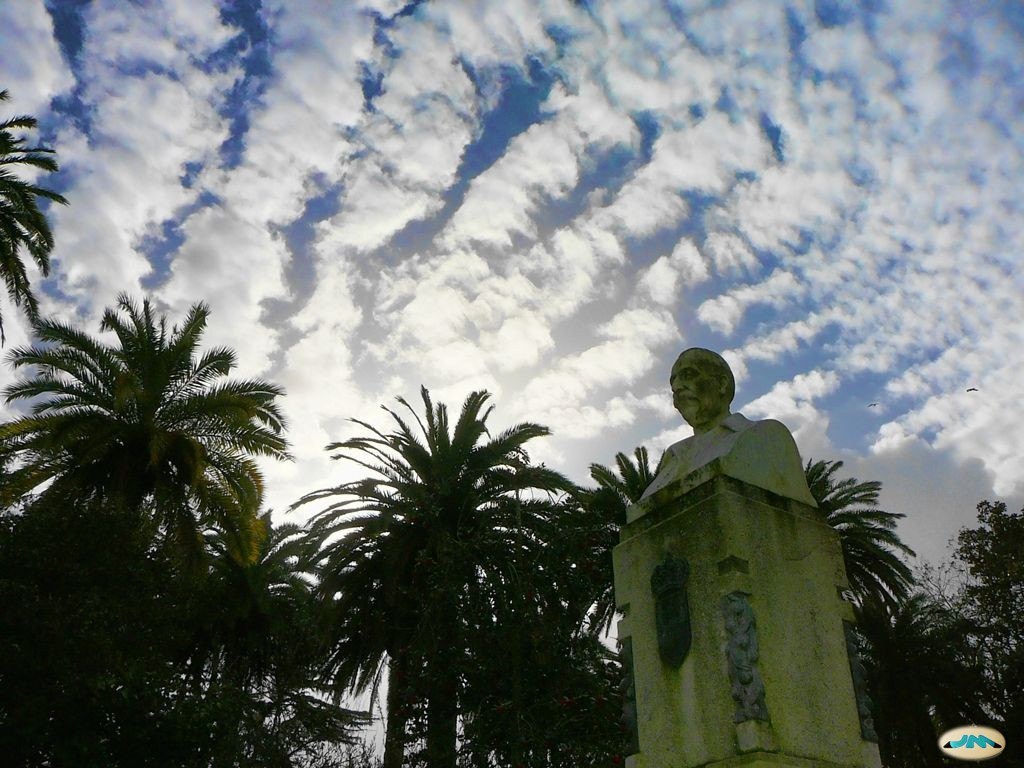
Eduardo Vincenti bust

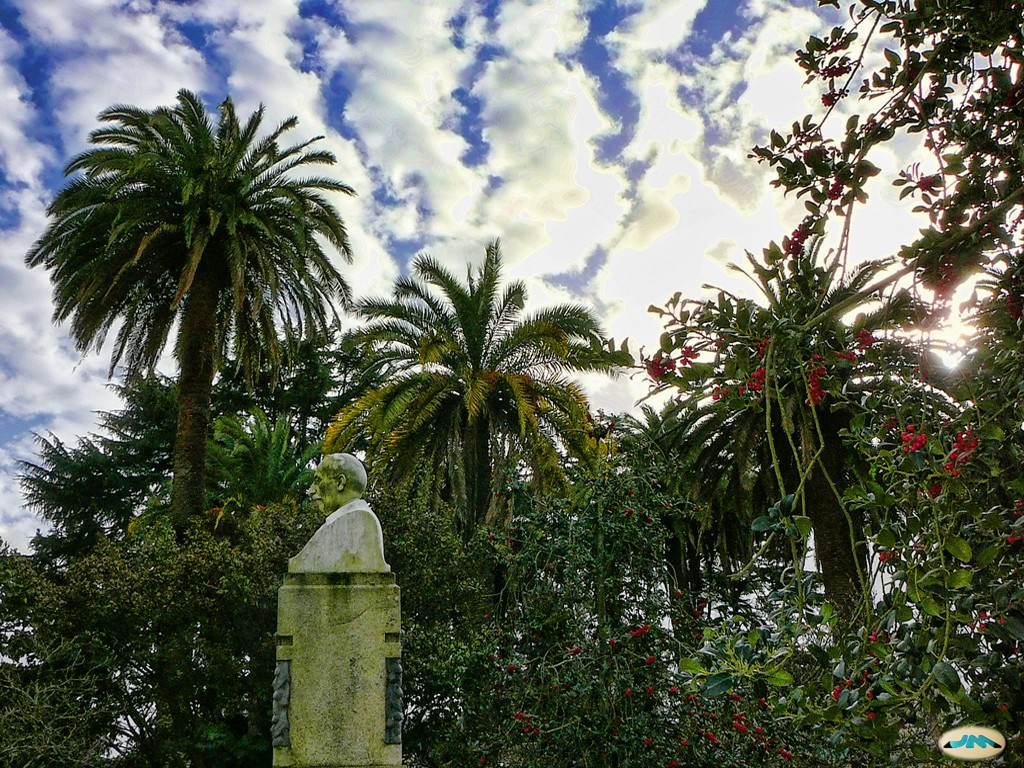
Eduardo Vincenti bust

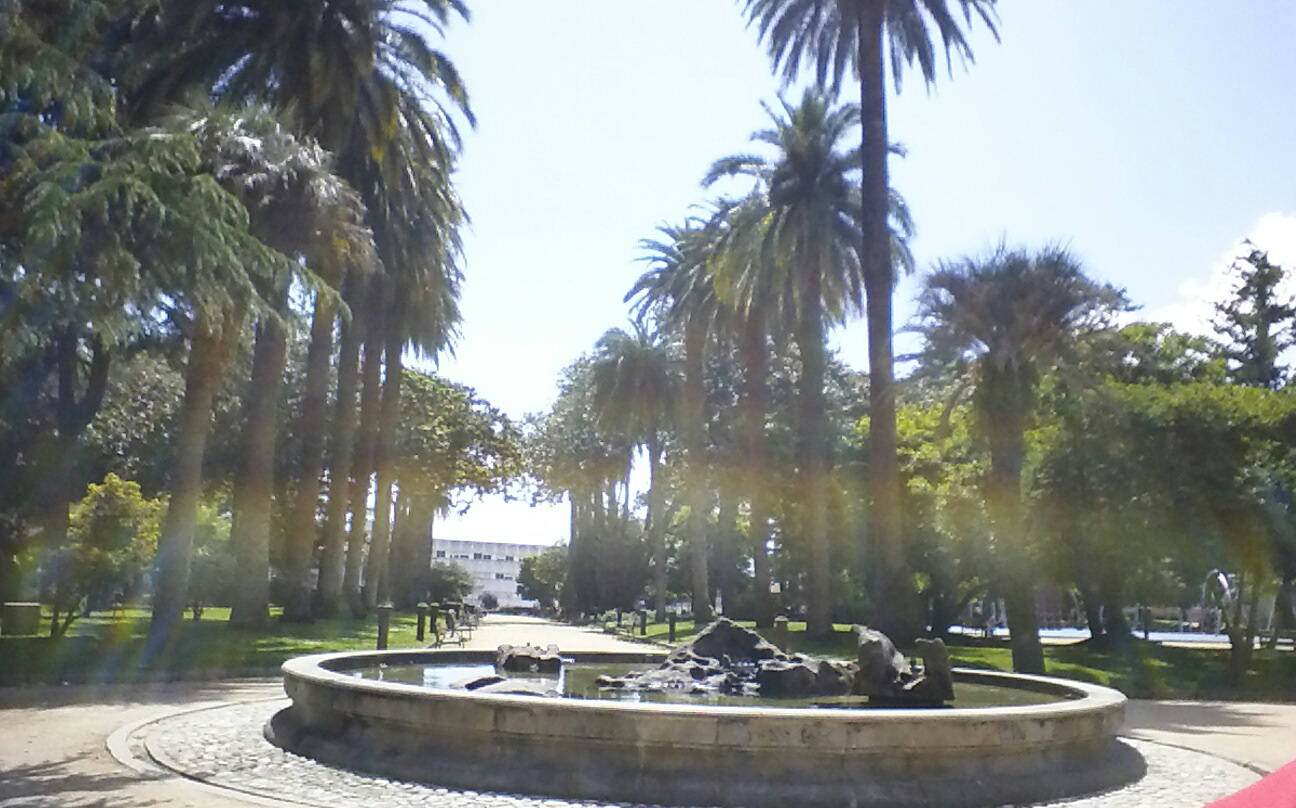
Central alley of palm trees and fountain in the foreground

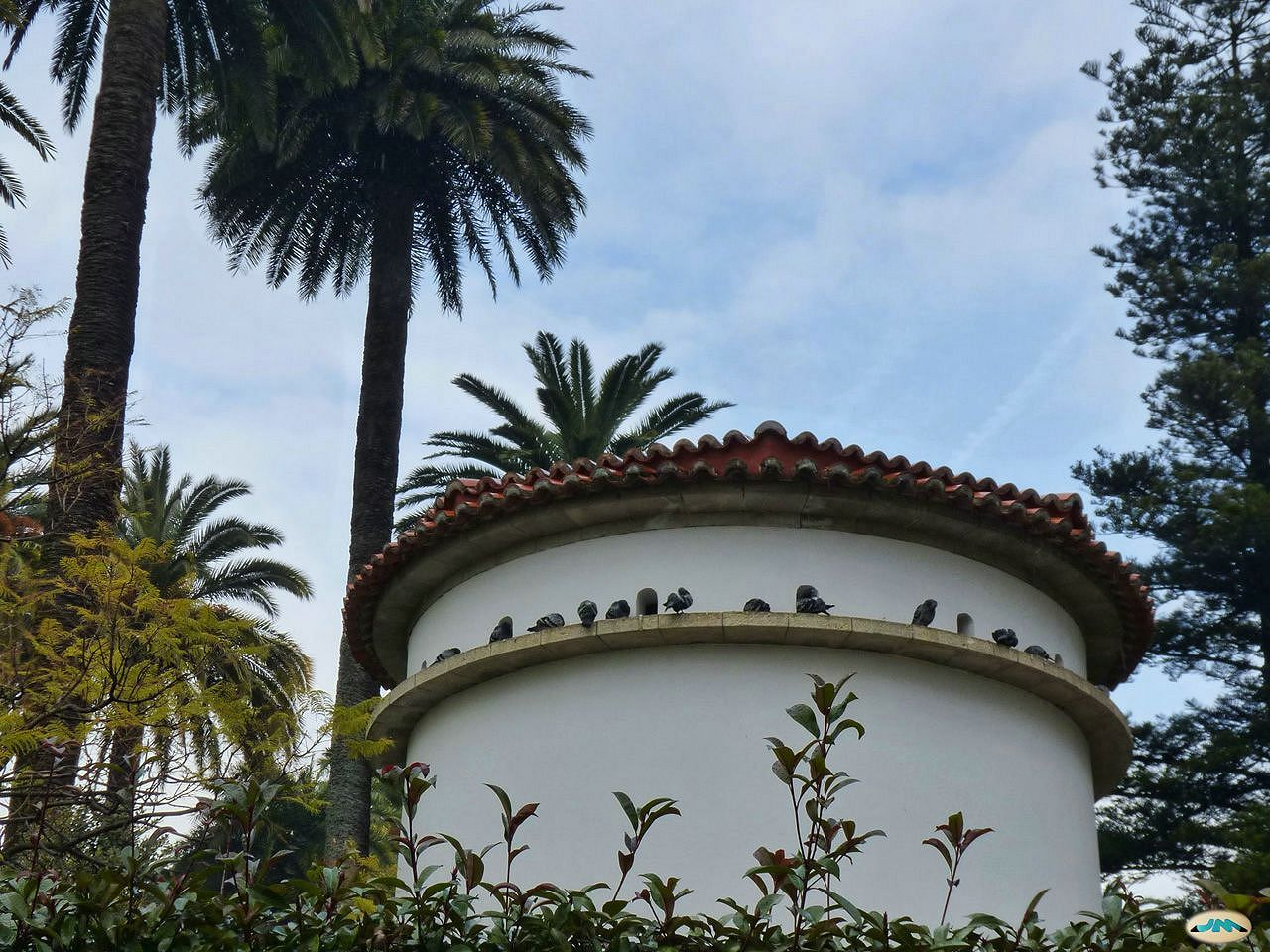
Dovecote

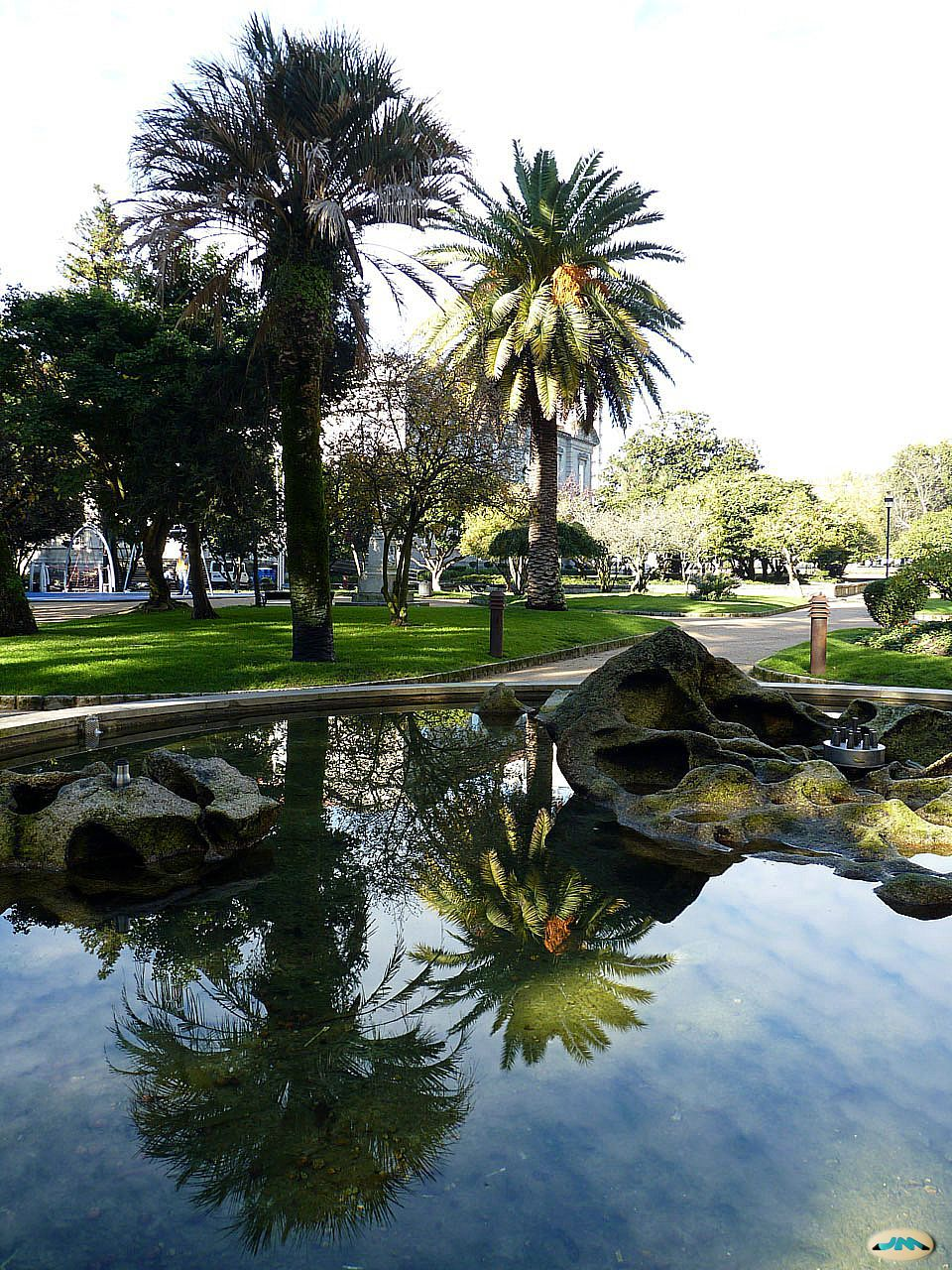
Fountain and rock with irregular holes

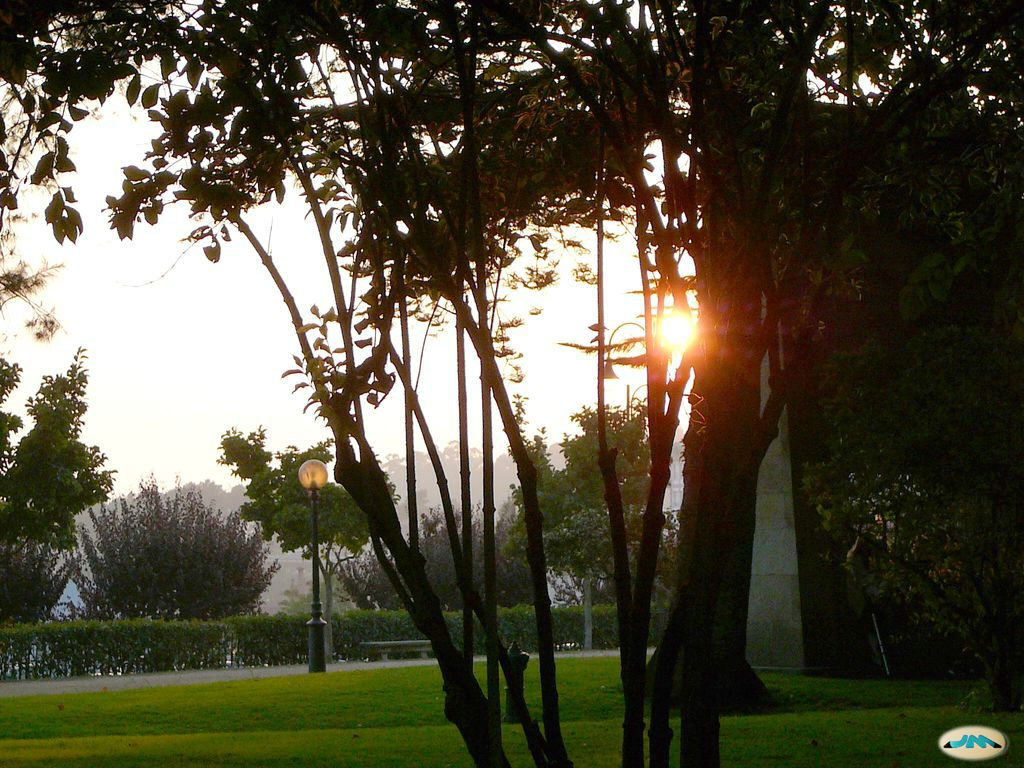
Vincenti Gardens

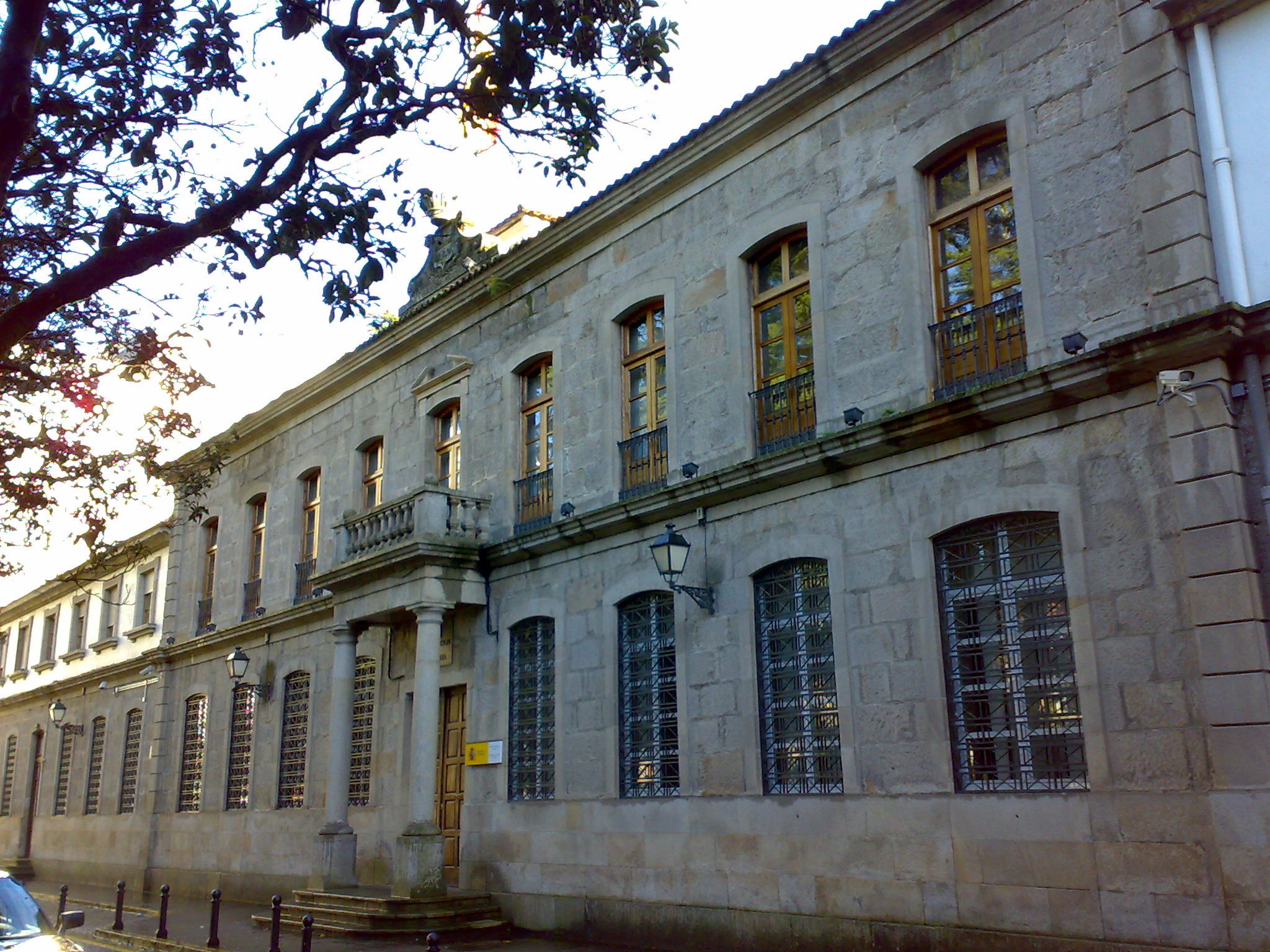
Provincial branch of the Ministry of Defence

== See also ==
=== Bibliography ===
- Aganzo, Carlos (2010). Pontevedra. Ciudades con encanto (in Spanish). Madrid: El País-Aguilar. pp. 96–98. ISBN 978-84-03-50934-4.
- Riveiro Tobío, Elvira (2008). Descubrir Pontevedra (in Spanish). Pontevedra: Edicións do Cumio. pp. 51, 136. ISBN 978-84-8289-085 2.

=== Related articles ===
- Canary Island palms
- Alameda de Pontevedra
- Gran Vía de Montero Ríos
- Ensanche-City Centre
- Marquis of Riestra Street
- Palacio de la Diputación de Pontevedra
- Valle-Inclán High School
- Gobierno Militar de Pontevedra

=== External links ===
- Parque de las Palmeras, on the website Visit-Pontevedra
- Jardines de Vincenti, on the website Galice Destination
