= Nakhla Dam =

Dam in Morocco

- Interactive map of Nakhla Dam
- Official name: Nakhla Barrage
- Country: Morocco
- Location: Tetouan
- Coordinates: 35°26′44.37″N 5°24′30.86″W
- Purpose: Water supply, irrigation
- Status: Operational
- Opening date: 1961

Dam and spillways
- Type of dam: Embankment, rock-fill
- Height: 46 m (151 ft)
- Length: 240 m (790 ft)
- Dam volume: 600,000 m^{3} (780,000 cu yd)
- Spillway type: Uncontrolled chute

Reservoir
- Total capacity: 5,700,000 m^{3} (4,600 acre⋅ft)
- Catchment area: 110 km^{2} (42 mi^{2})
- Normal elevation: 191 m (627 ft)

Nakhla Dam is a rock-filled embankment dam in northern Morocco. The primary purpose of the dam is water supply to the city of Tetouan, 20 km (12 mi) to the south. The dam was completed in 1961 but major reinforcement works were carried out in 1968. The P4701 road passes on its western side.
