= Palm wine (disambiguation) =

Palm wine is an alcoholic beverage.

Palm wine may also refer to:

- Palm-wine music, a West African musical genre
- The Palm-Wine Drinkard, a book by the Nigerian writer Amos Tutuola
