= Nakhl-e Yusef =

Nakhl-e Yusef نخل يوسف
- Village
- Location within Iran
- Coordinates: 26°39′44″N 54°28′21″E
- Country: Iran
- Province: Hormozgan
- County: Bandar Lengeh
- Bakhsh: Central
- Rural District: Moghuyeh

Population (2006)
  - Total: 95
- Time zone: UTC+3:30 (IRST)
  - Summer (DST): UTC+4:30 (IRDT)

Nakhl-e Yusef (Persian: نخل يوسف, also Romanized as Nakhl-e Yūsef; also known as Nakhl-e Moḩammad Yūsef) is a village in Moghuyeh Rural District, in the Central District of Bandar Lengeh County, Hormozgan Province, Iran. At the 2006 census, its population was 95, in 17 families.
