= Palme (surname) =

Palme is a surname. Notable people with the surname include:

- Franc Palme (1914–1946), Yugoslavian Olympic alpine skier
- Gabriele Palme (born 1964), German handball player
- Henry Palmé (1907–1987), Swedish marathon runner
- Joakim Palme (born 1958), Swedish political scientist, son of Olof and Lisbeth Palme
- Lisbeth Palme (1931–2018), Swedish children's psychologist, international chairwoman for UNICEF, wife of Olof Palme
- Margit Palme (1939–2025), Austrian painter
- Mårten Palme (born 1961), Swedish economist, son of Olof and Lisbeth Palme
- Olof Palme (1927–1986), assassinated Prime Minister of Sweden
- Rajani Palme Dutt (1896–1974), British politician
- Rudolf Palme (1910–2005), Austrian chess player
- Sieur de la Palme, Newfoundland governor
- Ulf Palme (1920–1993), Swedish actor
