= Calle Marqués de Riestra =

Street in Pontevedra, Spain

Marquis of Riestra Street
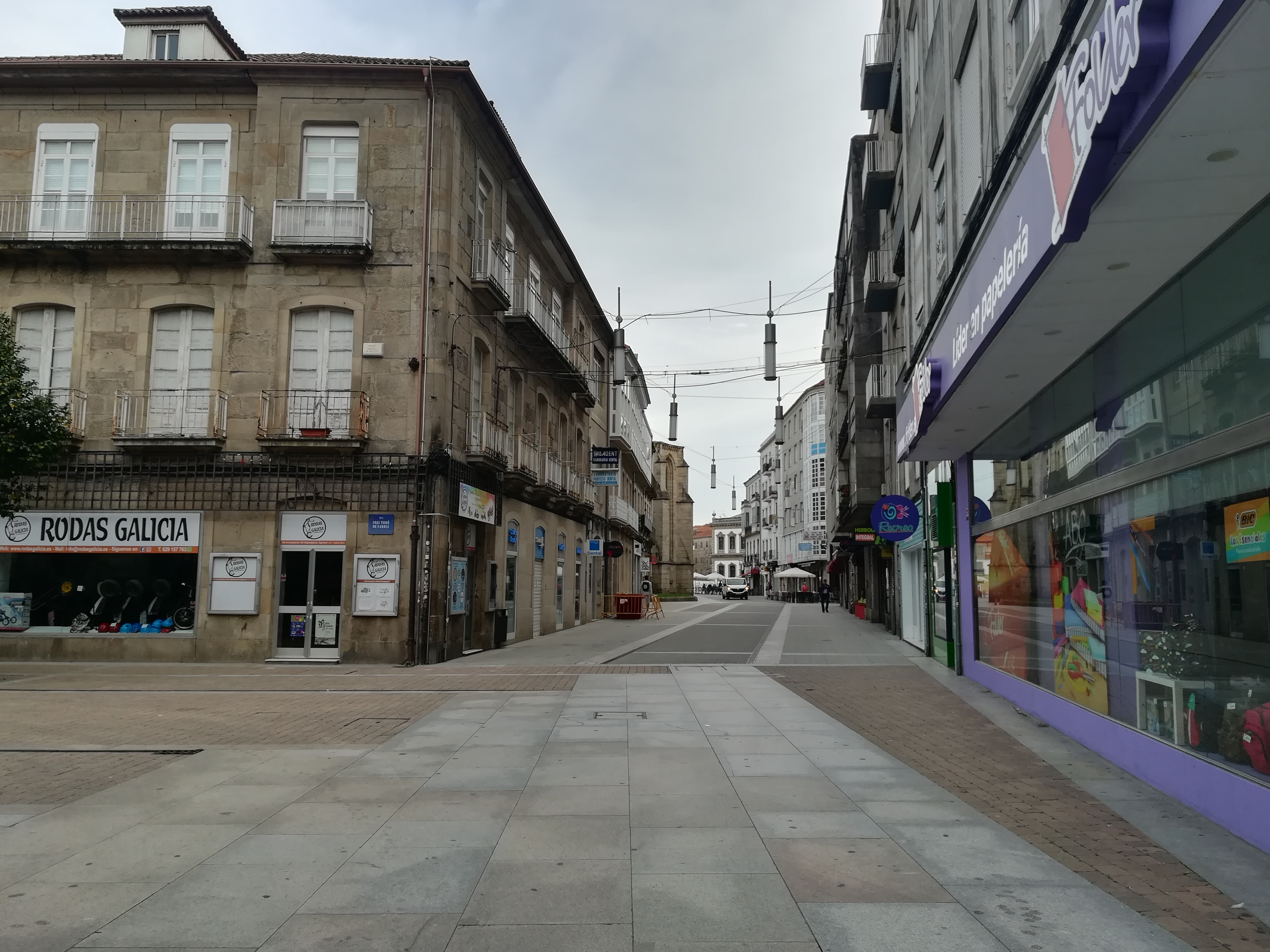
- Pedestrian section of Marquis de Riestra Street
- Native name: Calle Marqués de Riestra (Spanish)
- Type: Street
- Maintained by: Pontevedra City Council
- Location: Pontevedra, Spain
- Postal code: 36001
- Coordinates: 42.430139°N 8.646556°W

The Marquis of Riestra street is a central street in the Spanish city of Pontevedra, in the first expansion zone of the city in the 19th century, running longitudinally parallel to the Palm Trees Park on its eastern side. It is one of the main streets in Pontevedra city centre.

== Origin of the name ==
Since 1950, the street has been dedicated to José Riestra López, the first Marquis of Riestra (1853-1923), a great benefactor of Pontevedra. Among other initiatives, he was responsible for bringing electricity to the city in 1888 and the tramway in 1889, as well as various factories and businesses (the first electricity factories in Galicia in 1888 in Verdura square and the first ceramics factory in 1895 in La Barca, as well as the Riestra Bank), improving the city's streets and supporting the construction of institutional buildings. He devoted part of his capital to the city and also donated his manor house and estate at A Caeira for conversion into a large hospital for soldiers repatriated from Cuba and the Philippines following the Spanish-American War.

== History ==
In 1853, what is now Marquis de Riestra Street was a road that led from the old St Dominic's Gate of the Pontevedra walls in the España Square to the Saint Joseph's field in what is now the Saint Joseph's Square. From this date onwards, with the first expansion of the city, this road was progressively urbanised, until it was finally consolidated as a street around 1880, forming part of the first expansion of the city outside the old fortified area. Pontevedra City Council put up for sale the line of plots of land opposite Riestra Street that came from the Dominican estate, which had been acquired by auction.

On 21 December 1880, the Pontevedra City Council decided to name the street that runs from the Alameda Gardens to the end of the old Fairground after the liberal politician Francisco Antonio Riestra Vallaure (father of the Marquis), who died in Madrid, for his enterprising spirit and for having carried out most of the city's initial expansion work from 1860 onwards.

In these new areas of Pontevedra's first expansion, buildings were erected which, through their form and function, reinforced the bourgeois restoration project, representing the new Pontevedra. In 1896, the publisher, journalist and politician Andrés Landín Varela built a building at number 7, on the ground floor of which he set up a printing works and bookshop, as well as his home on the first floor. In 1905, Manuel Martínez Bautista, a Cuban indiano, completed work on the Villa Pilar mansion on the left-hand side of the street (with a rear façade overlooking the Palm Trees Park).

In 1927, the demolition of the premises of a garage on the right-hand side of the street was imposed to allow the new General Gutiérrez Mellado Street, which led to Riestra Street from Michelena Street, to be fully opened up. The last houses blocking the opening of the new street had already been expropriated and demolished in May 1927, although the garage premises on Riestra street were not demolished until 1930.

In 1950, the street was renamed Marquis of Riestra, a title granted by King Alfonso XIII to José Riestra López on 4 February 1893 by royal decree. The Riestra passageway from Michelena street was named Marquise street, in reference to the wife of the Marquis of Riestra, María Calderón Ozores, daughter of the Count of San Juan. In 1965, the Vázquez Lescaille galleries were opened, from General Gutiérrez Mellado Street to Marquis of Riestra Street.

In 2006, the first section of the street, from the España Square to General Gutiérrez Mellado Street, was renovated and made pedestrian-friendly.

== Description ==
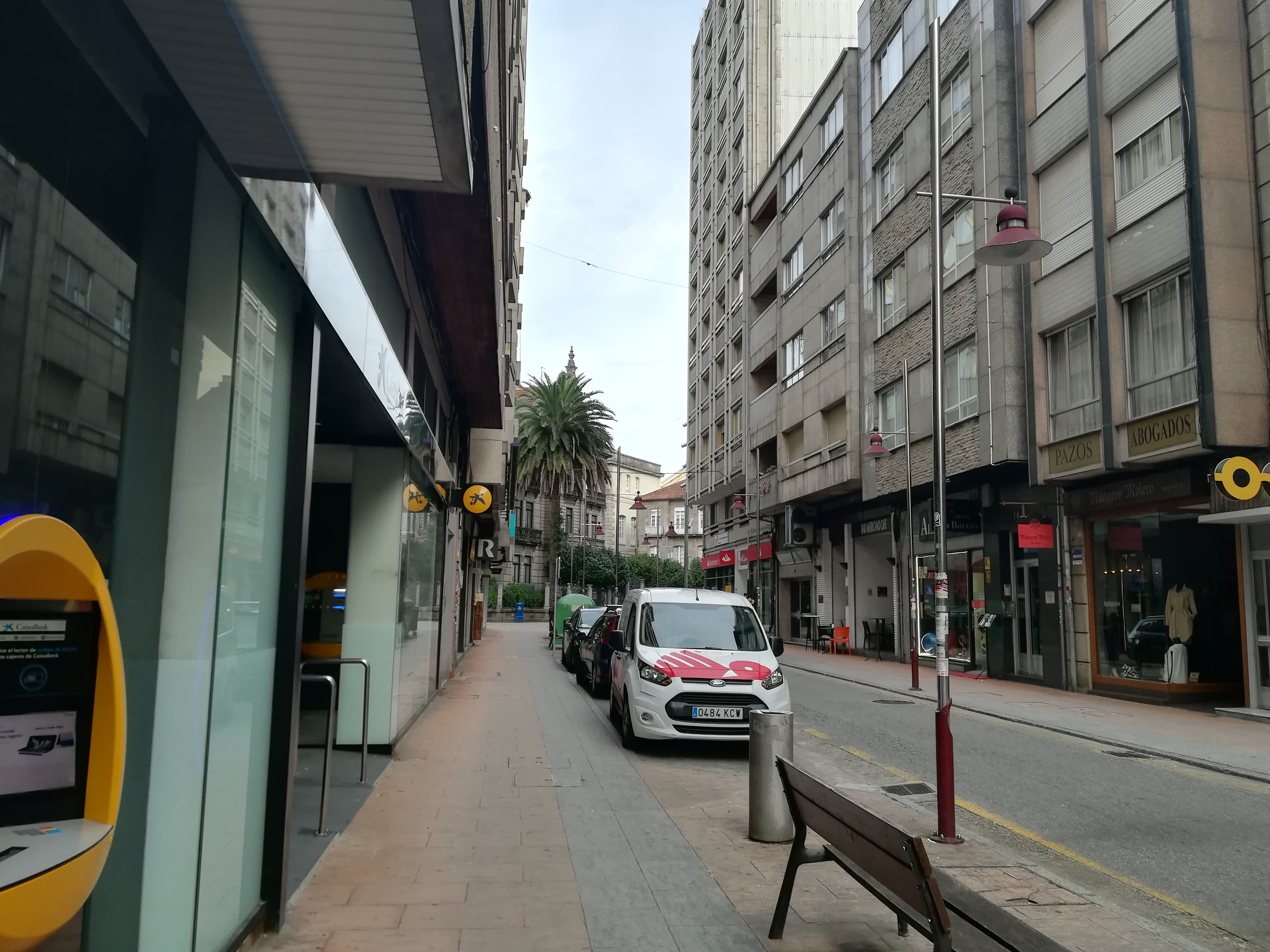
South-east section of the street.

Marquis de Riestra is a 260-metre-long street located in the city's first urban expansion zone, which follows a north–south-east axis and is divided into two sections: a paved pedestrian section from España Square to General Gutiérrez Mellado Street and another section facing south-east from Gutiérrez Mellado Street to Saint Joseph Square, which has two pavements and a central lane for traffic.

It is an essentially flat street, with an average width of 11 metres. The pedestrianised Marquise Street, Gutiérrez Mellado Street on the right-hand side and the small streets of Fray Tomás de Sarria and Enrique Labarta on either side of the garden of the Villa Pilar mansion converge here from north to south.

This is a very commercial and service-oriented street, with numerous shops, cafés and bank branches. At the beginning, at the junction with Gran Vía de Montero Ríos, is the apse of the Gothic ruins of the former convent and church of Saint Dominic, next to a stone calvary that stood in the forecourt of the former medieval church of Saint Bartholomew before it was demolished. In the middle of the street is Villa Pilar, an eclectic mansion built in 1905.

== Outstanding buildings ==
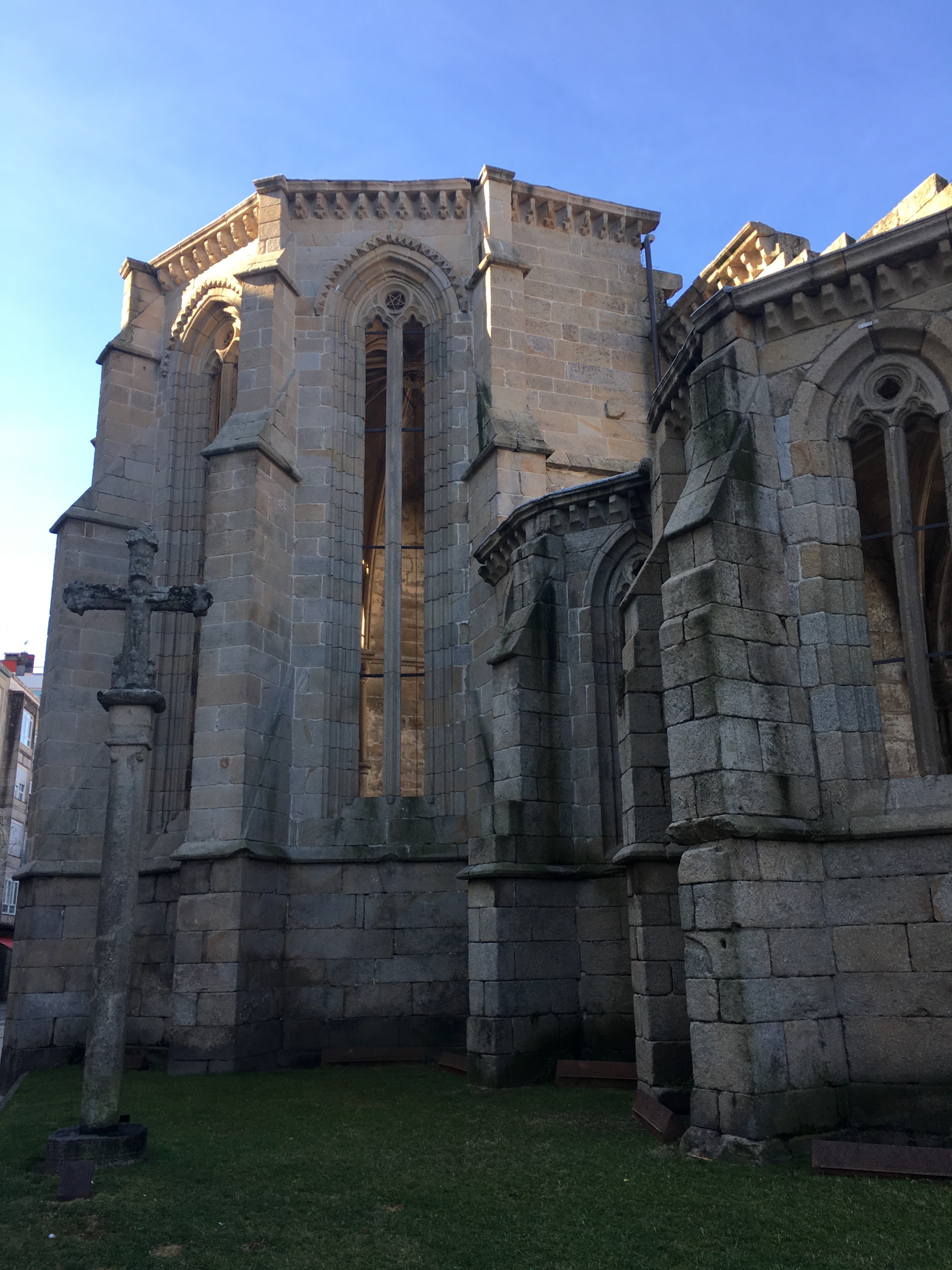
Gothic transept and apses in the ruins of Saint-Dominic church.

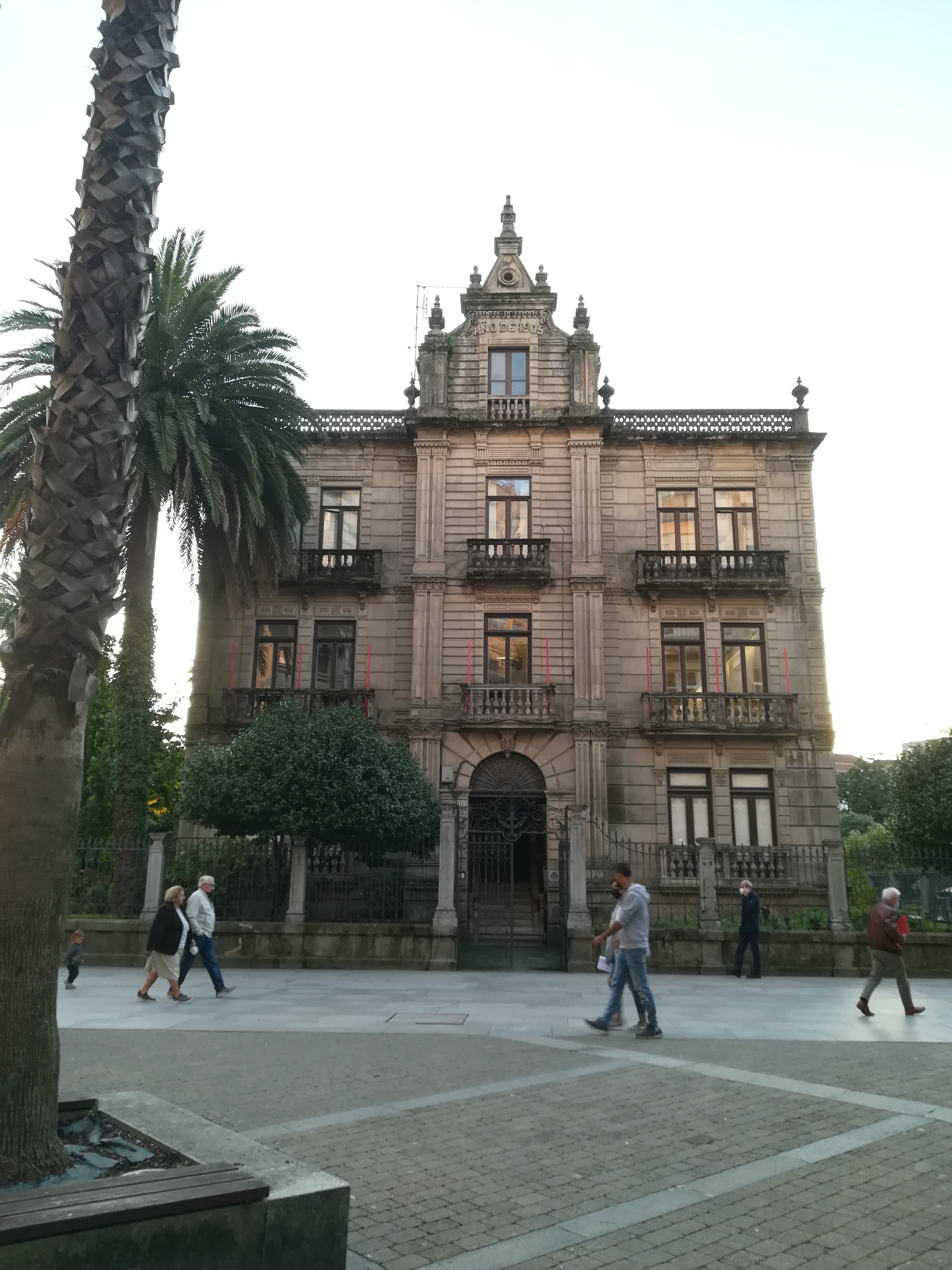
Villa Pilar at number 11.

At the beginning of Marquis de Riestra Street, the ruins of the Saint Dominic Convent are the remains of a 14th-century Gothic convent and church. Today, along with five other buildings, they form the Provincial Museum of Pontevedra and were declared a Site of Cultural Interest in 1895. Only the apse remains, with five apsidal chapels corresponding to the transverse arm of the transept, which are the purest example of Gothic architecture in Galicia.

At number 11, the Villa Pilar mansion is located. Construction began in 1899 and was completed in 1905. The building is in the eclectic, Art Nouveau style, with three storeys and a single body. It has a semi-basement, three floors and an attic. Its architectural features include continuous bossages and English-style balustrades on all the concrete balconies, a highly innovative feature for the time. The building blends harmoniously into its surroundings, as it is surrounded by a small private garden with palm trees, enclosed by a wrought iron gate. Access to the interior of the building is via Carrara marble staircases on the first floor and wooden staircases on the subsequent floors. The layout of the various floors reflects the lifestyle of the late 19th-century bourgeoisie.

The row of stone houses between the ruins of the Saint Dominic convent and the Villa Pilar mansion, between numbers 13 and 21, are typical of the first expansion of Pontevedra in the 19th century, like those on Oliva Street. They have a ground floor and two upper floors, with balconies on the first floor and galleries on the second, or with balconies on both floors.

At number 3 of Marquis de Riestra Street, on the corner of Pastor Díaz Street and with the main entrance at number 7 of Arquitecto de la Sota Street, stands a 7-storey rationalist residential building designed by architect Alejandro de la Sota in 1970, which is unique in Galicia. The brownish concrete building incorporates galleries on its façades, has an entrance reduced to its essential lines and has attic space surrounded by a garden.

At number 30 of the Oliva street, on the corner of the Marquis de Riestra street, stands a 1930 rationalist building designed by the architect Emilio Salgado Urtiaga.

== See also ==
=== Bibliography ===
- Aganzo, Carlos (2010). Pontevedra. Ciudades con encanto (in Spanish). Madrid: El País-Aguilar. p. 85; 97. ISBN 978-8403509344.
- Durán Villa, Francisco (2000). Provincia de Pontevedra (in Spanish). Madrid: Mediterráneo. p. 88; 96. ISBN 8471563371.
- Fontoira Surís, Rafael (2009). Pontevedra monumental (in Galician). Pontevedra: Diputación de Pontevedra. p. 407; 438. ISBN 9788484573272.
- González Clavijo, Pepy (2008). Las calles de Pontevedra (in Spanish). Pontevedra: Diputación de Pontevedra. pp. 181–182. ISBN 978-84-8457-312-8.
- Juega Puig, Juan (2000). As rúas de Pontevedra (in Galician). Pontevedra: Diputación de Pontevedra. pp. 92–93. ISBN 84-8457-044-4.
- Riveiro Tobío, Elvira (2008). Descubrir Pontevedra (in Spanish). Pontevedra: Edicións do Cumio. p. 29. ISBN 9788482890852.
- Rodríguez Mouriño, Matías G. (2020). "Algunas notas acerca de Villa Pilar: una arquitectura indiana en la Pontevedra de la Restauración". Arte y ciudad. Revista de Investigación (in Spanish) (17): 117–142. ISSN 2254-2930.

=== Related articles ===
- Villa Pilar
- Ruins of Saint Dominic convent
- Ensanche-City Centre
- Mansion of the Marquis of Riestra
- Michelena Street
