= Calle General Gutiérrez Mellado =

Street in Pontevedra, Spain

General Gutiérrez Mellado Street
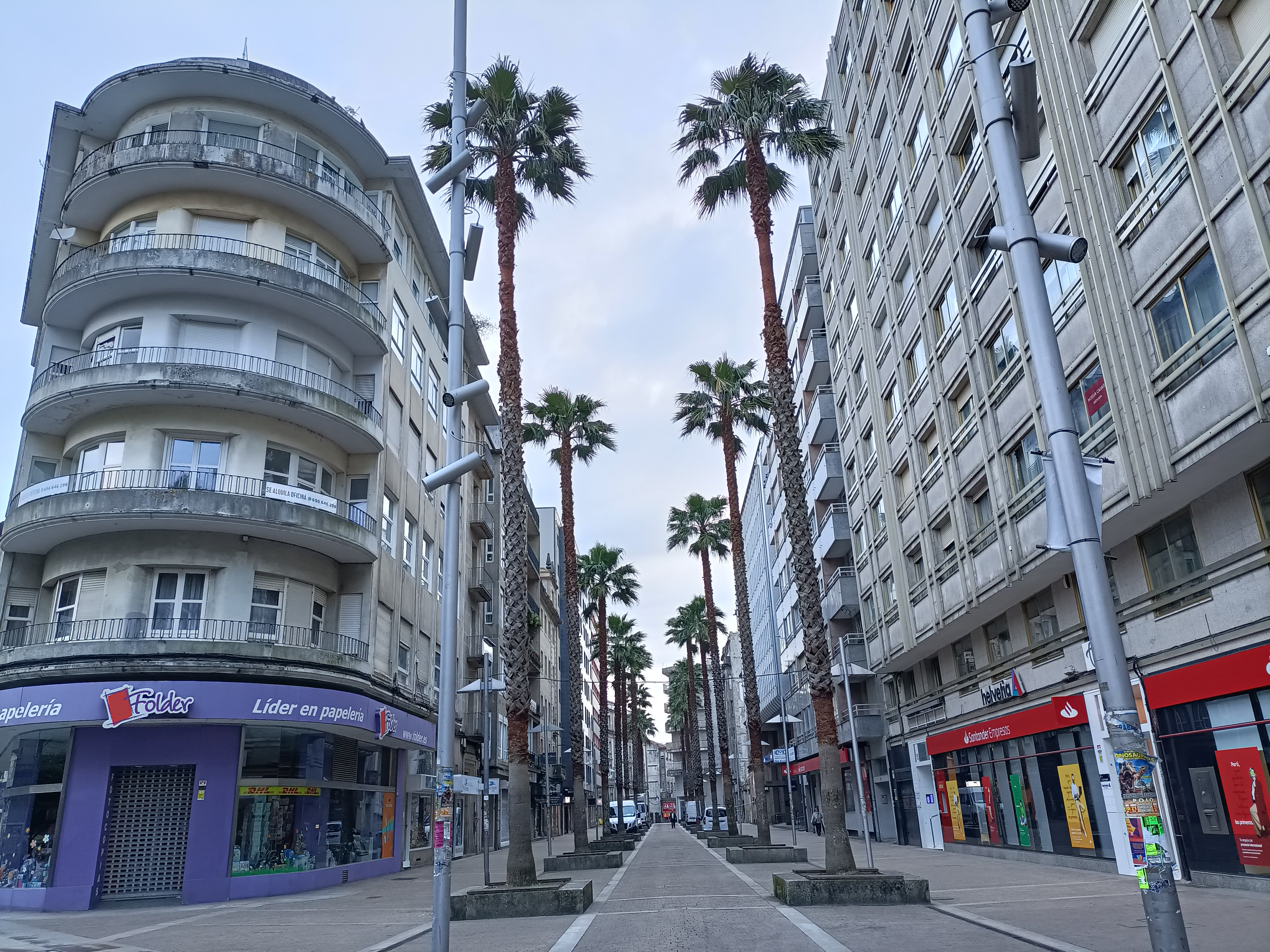
- General Gutiérrez Mellado Street in 2024
- Native name: Calle General Gutiérrez Mellado (Spanish)
- Type: Street
- Maintained by: Pontevedra City Council
- Location: Pontevedra, Spain
- Postal code: 36001
- Coordinates: 42.430889°N 8.646056°W

The Calle General Gutiérrez Mellado is a pedestrian street in the Spanish city of Pontevedra, located in the first urban expansion zone. It is one of Pontevedra's main streets.

== Origin of the name ==
Since 1996, the street has been dedicated to the military officer and politician Manuel Gutiérrez Mellado for his important work during Spanish transition to democracy and with the aim of removing Francoist names from the city's street map, such as his former name, General Mola.

== History ==
The origin of the street lies in the agreement adopted by Pontevedra City Council on 5 January 1896 to open a new street between Marquis of Riestra Street and Michelena Street, through the property and gardens of Alejandro Mon Landa. In 1900, the land needed to build the street was made public.

In 1925, the opening of the new street was finally announced, to link Michelena Street and Marquis de Riestra Street and to urbanise an important area of the city centre. In 1926, the expropriations were paid for and on 25 August of the same year, work began on opening the street.

Work to complete the new street took longer than expected due to the need to demolish a garage located at the end of the street, opposite Marquis de Riestra Street. The last houses on this street, which prevented the complete opening of the new street known as the Fernández Villaverde extension, had already been expropriated and were demolished in May 1927. In June of the same year, the owners of the plots along the new street began to fence them in. By the end of 1929, the street had still not been laid out, and the shacks of the old garage at the end of the street were still standing.

During the first few years of its existence, the new street was known as Calle del Chanchullo (Street of Scams) due to the hidden and contrived negotiations that had taken place to get it opened from the outset, and because the street had not been opened in accordance with the project approved by the City Council. In May 1931, the earthworks for the new street were completed, and by 1935 cars were already using the street normally. At the beginning of June 1936, the managing director of Telefónica announced the forthcoming construction of a building at number 5 Street for Central Telefónica, which would become its headquarters in Pontevedra and house the company's offices in the city.

On 26 June 1937, the street was named after General Mola, who died on 3 June in a plane crash. In the same year, the sewage system was installed and the water supply connected to facilitate the construction of the buildings, which had not yet begun. In 1938, the street was finally paved.

Most of the street's current buildings were constructed in the 1960s, with the current building site completed in the early 1970s. During these decades, the street became a commercial area with well-known establishments such as the Vázquez Lescaille record and appliance shop, which opened in 1956. The street was also a point of reference for intercity bus stops during these decades. Several banks established their branches on its east side and numerous shops were set up on its west side.

In 1965, a second section of the Oliva Street shopping arcades was opened through the building at number 3, linking this street to General Gutiérrez Mellado Street.

On 25 April 1996, the city council decided to change the street's original name to General Gutiérrez Mellado, a general who had died four months earlier.

In 2002, a major renovation of the street was undertaken to make it pedestrianised. The work was completed in early May 2003.

In April 2023, when the building at number 3 was demolished to make way for the construction of a new building for a flagship Zara department stores', the exit from the shopping arcades onto rue Oliva was closed off.

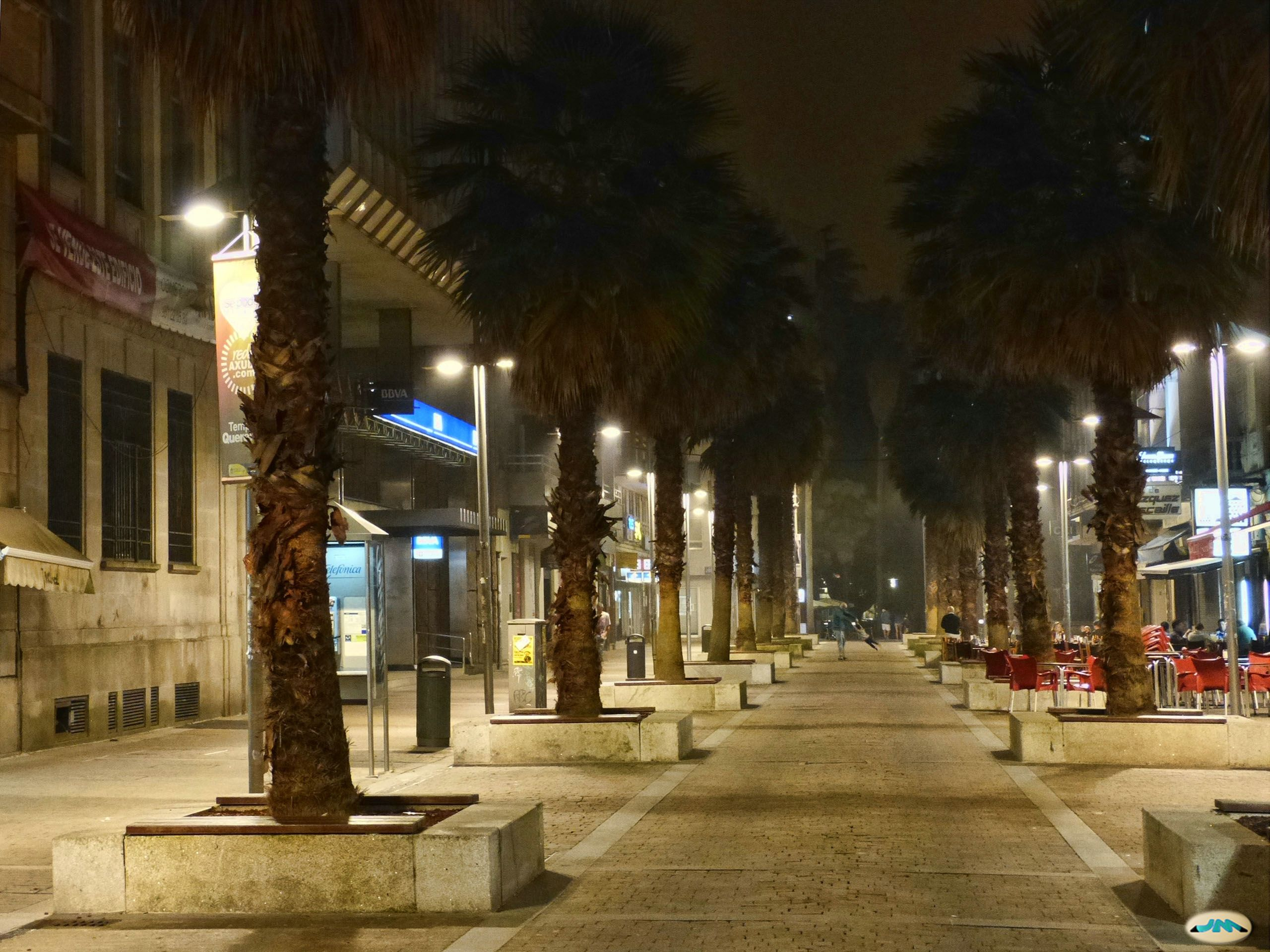
The street at night with its Californian fan palm trees.

== Description ==
This is a 140-metre-long pedestrian street, straight and flat, located in the heart of the city centre, linking the Palm Trees Park to the old town. Its average width is 20 metres.

This is a central street of the first urban expansion, between Marquis of Riestra and Michelena streets, on the edge of the historic centre of Pontevedra.

The street is lined with shops and bank branches. The ochre-coloured paving is framed by strips of granite on the sides to differentiate between areas reserved for pedestrians and the central pedestrianised lane reserved for vehicles needed to serve the area and access local residents' garages.

The most striking feature of the street are the two rows of large Californian fan palms that line the central walkway and provide a smooth transition between the Palm Trees Park and the historic centre of Pontevedra. The upper part of the trees' wide stone enclosures, which include night lighting, is covered with wooden benches located at either end of the palm trees.

== See also ==
=== Bibliography ===
- Blanco Dios, Jaime Bernardo; Castro González, Amancio (2010). As árbores da cidade de Pontevedra (in Galician). Pontevedra: Concello de Pontevedra. p. 214. ISBN 978-84-606-5147-5.
- Juega Puig, Juan (2000). As rúas de Pontevedra (in Galician). Pontevedra: Diputación de Pontevedra. p. 94. ISBN 84-8457-044-4.

=== Related articles ===
- Ensanche-City Centre
- Michelena Street
- Marquis of Riestra Street
- Villa Pilar
- Palms Trees Park
