= Villa Pilar =

Mansion in Pontevedra, Spain

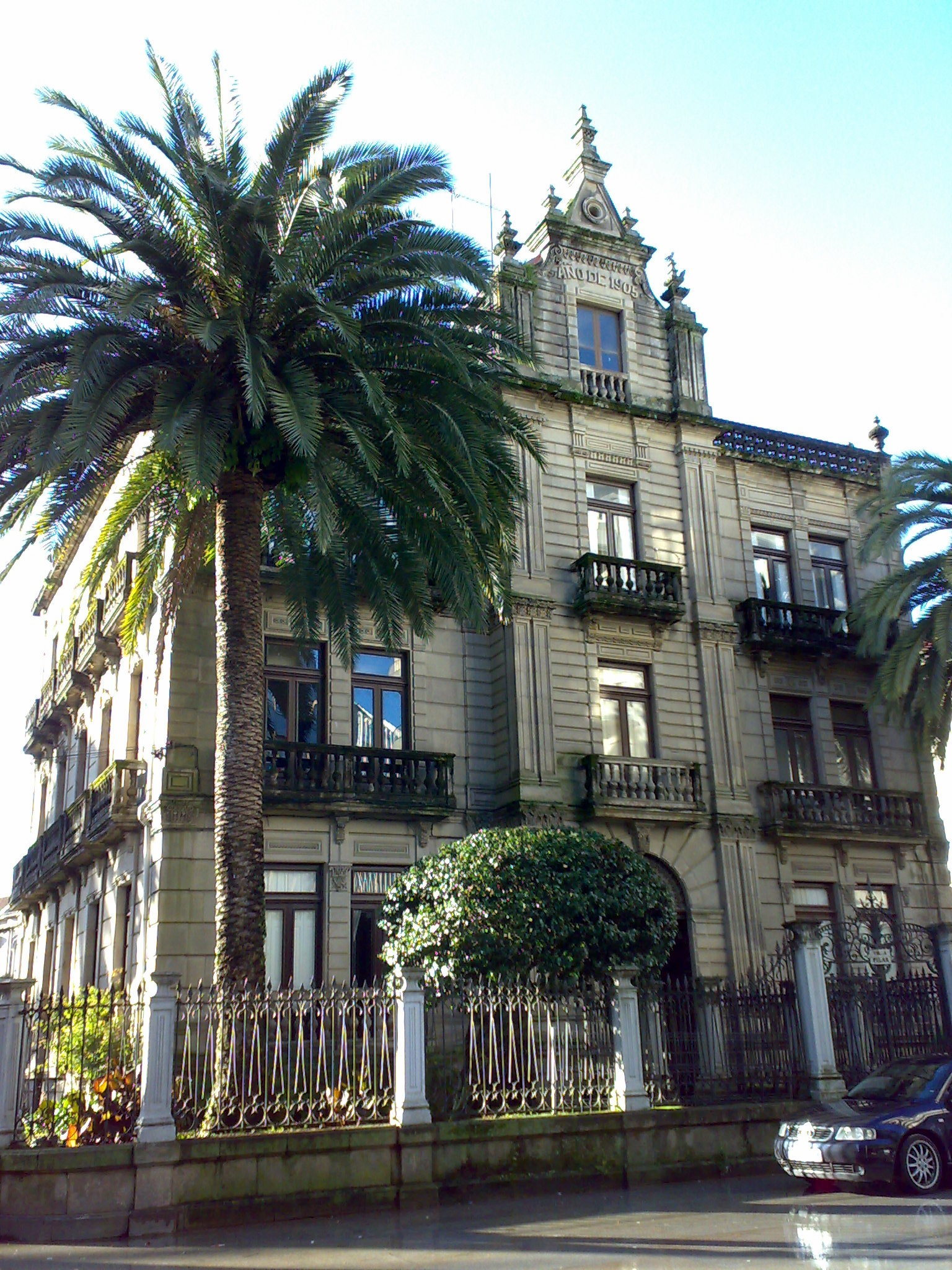
- Rear façade
- Interactive map of the Villa Pilar area

General information
- Type: Mansion
- Location: Pontevedra, Galicia, Spain
- Coordinates: 42°25′49.1″N 8°38′48.8″W
- Construction started: 1899
- Completed: 1905

Technical details
- Floor count: 3

Design and construction
- Architect: Antonio Crespo

Website
- nemonon.com

Villa Pilar is an eclectic, Art Nouveau mansion located in Marquis of Riestra Street in Pontevedra, Spain. It is one of the best examples of the architecture of Spanish colonists who went to Spanish America and returned rich (Indianos) in the city.

== History ==
This mansion, whose construction began in 1899 and was completed in 1905, was built as a bourgeois residence by order of the indiano Manuel Martínez Bautista, who lived in Cuba. He bought the land during a summer trip and the work lasted six years.

The author of the project was the architect Antonio Crespo. Two projects from 1889 have been preserved, with a similar plan and height, but with a different design from the one finally executed.

Villa Pilar was bequeathed by Manuel Martínez Bautista to his nephew Ramiro Trapote Martínez, an engineer living in New York City who spent his summers there. Villa Pilar was passed on from Ramiro Trapote to his niece Pilar Pardo Trapote, and is now owned by his heirs.

A series of famous people in the city and entities, such as Vicente Riestra, Ernesto Caballero or a notary have lived there.

On the second floor was the Pontevedra School of Architects, a flat rented to the National Brotherhood of Architects, the group's mutual society, which in turn acquired it from the family that owned the building in 1982.

In 2011, the building was put up for sale for 600,000 euros. Since 31 October 2015, it has housed the Nemonon architectural studio on the second floor, a multidisciplinary creative space around architecture promoted by the architect Mauro Lomba. In its three rooms: Woodwork, Belle Époque and Belvedere, and in "the architect's kitchen", it hosts events such as meetings, seminars, conferences, exhibitions, workshops, and courses.

== Description ==
The building is in the eclectic and Art Nouveau style, with three storeys in height and a single body. The most remarkable feature of this mansion is the irregularity of its plan and façade, exaggerated in its finish. The Villa has a semi-basement, three floors and an attic. Among its architectural elements, the English-style balustrades on all the balconies, made of concrete, are noteworthy, a very innovative element for the time. The building is harmoniously integrated into its surroundings, as it is surrounded by a small private garden with palm trees closed by a wrought iron gate.

The interior of the building is accessed by Carrara marble staircases on the first floor and wooden staircases on the following floors. The balustrades are in concrete and the interior woodwork is all in fine wood. Its interior functionality met the needs of the time, highlighting the harmony of its lines and forms and the perfect conjunction of its architectural elements. The layout of the various floors reflects the lifestyle of the bourgeoisie at the end of the 19th century. The architect therefore attached great importance to the social space, with three rooms and an office with independent access.

== Gallery ==
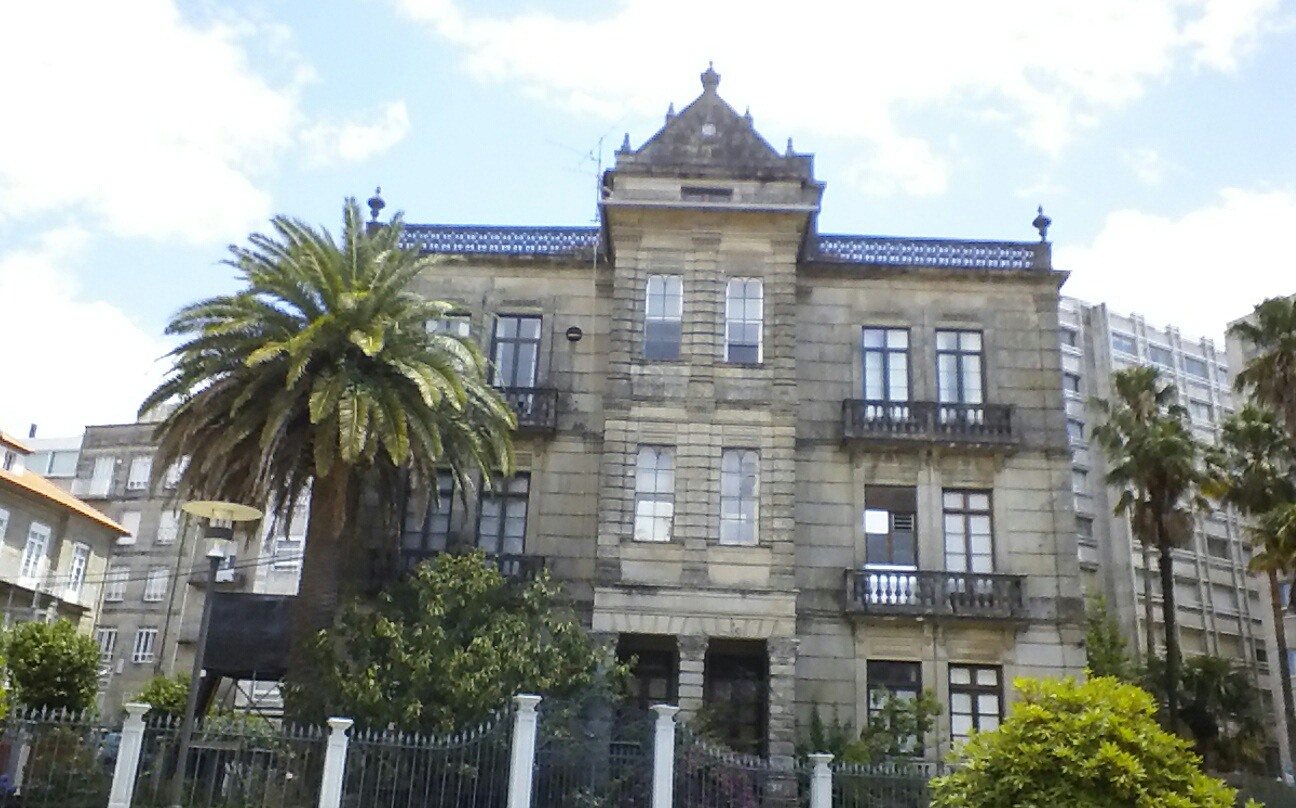
Back side

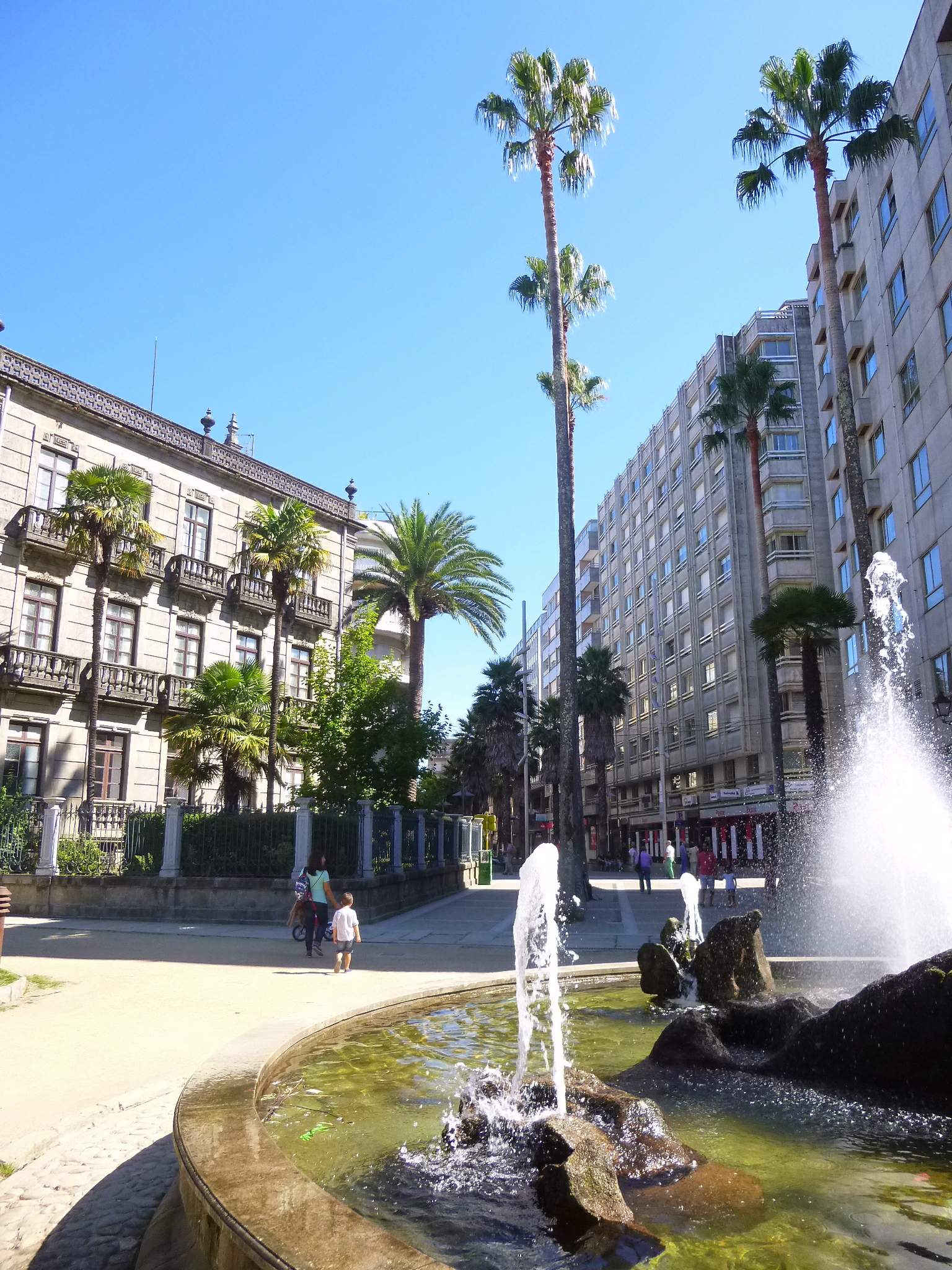
Side façade

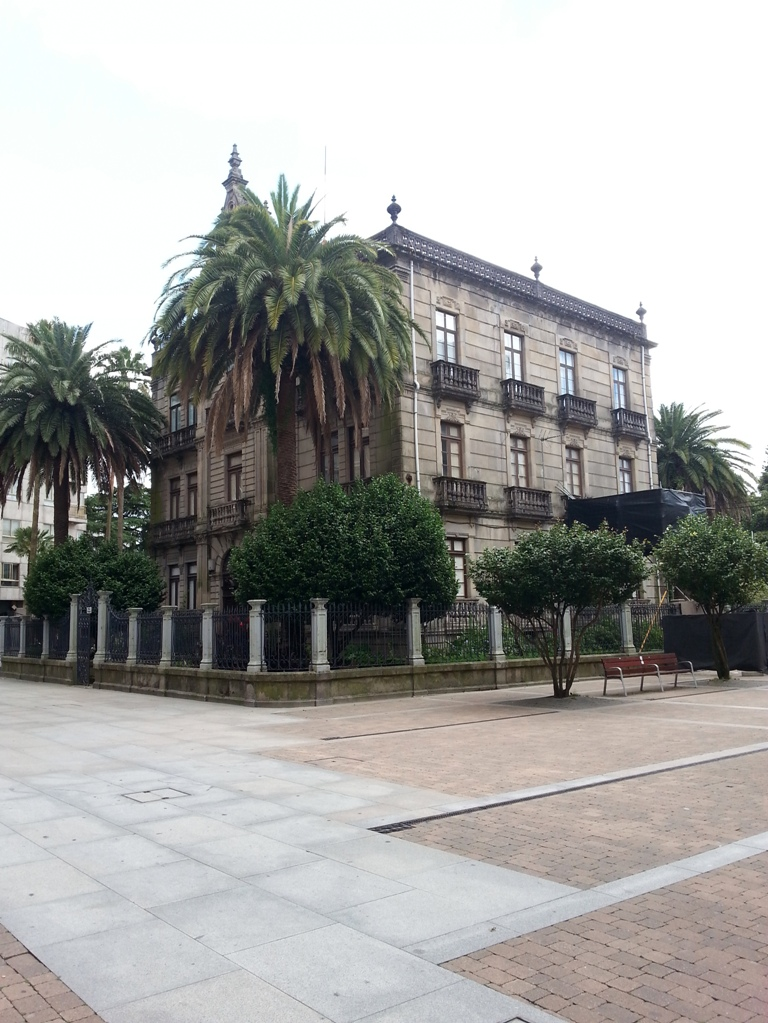
Villa Pilar, Riestra Street

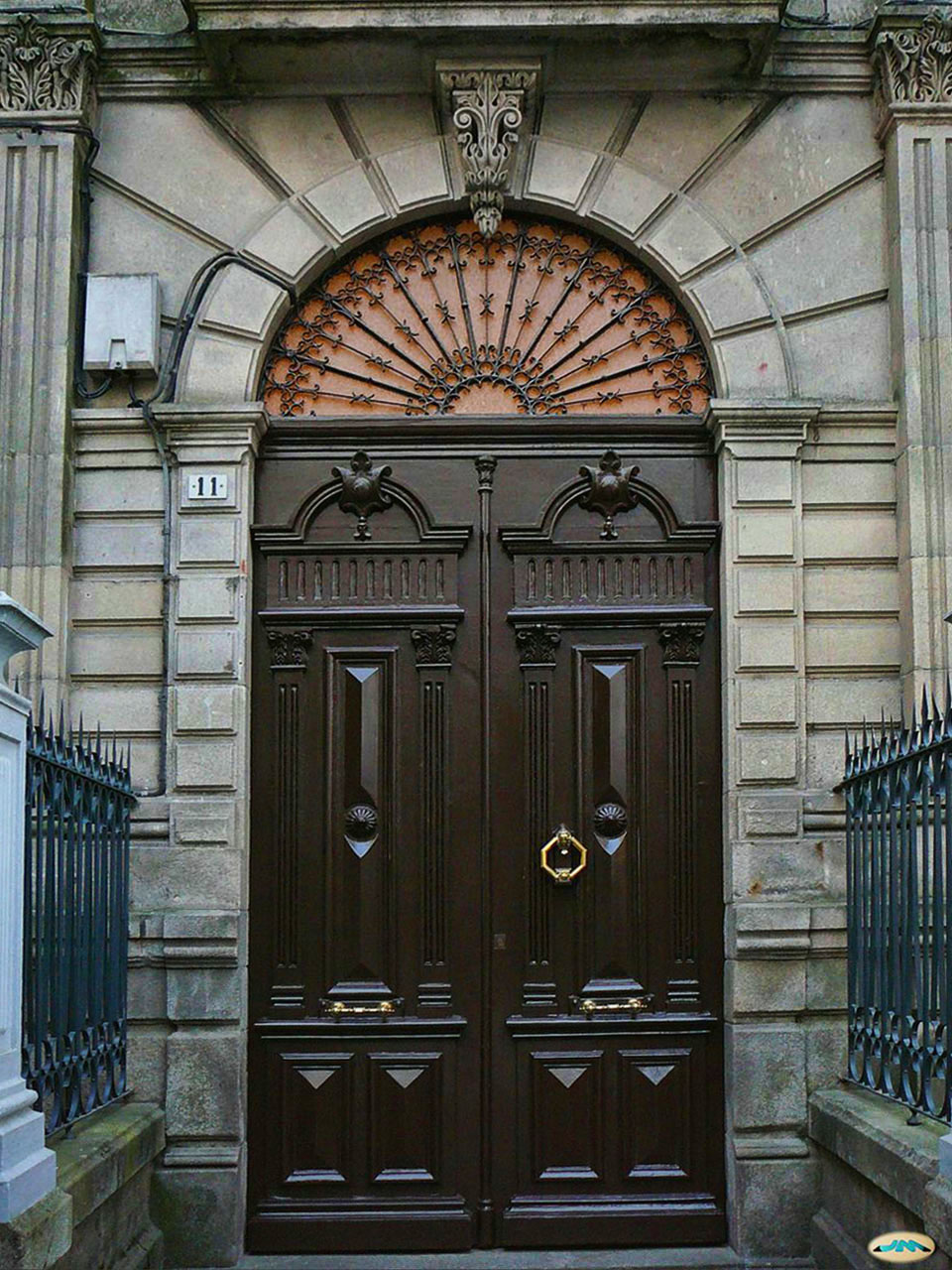
Front door

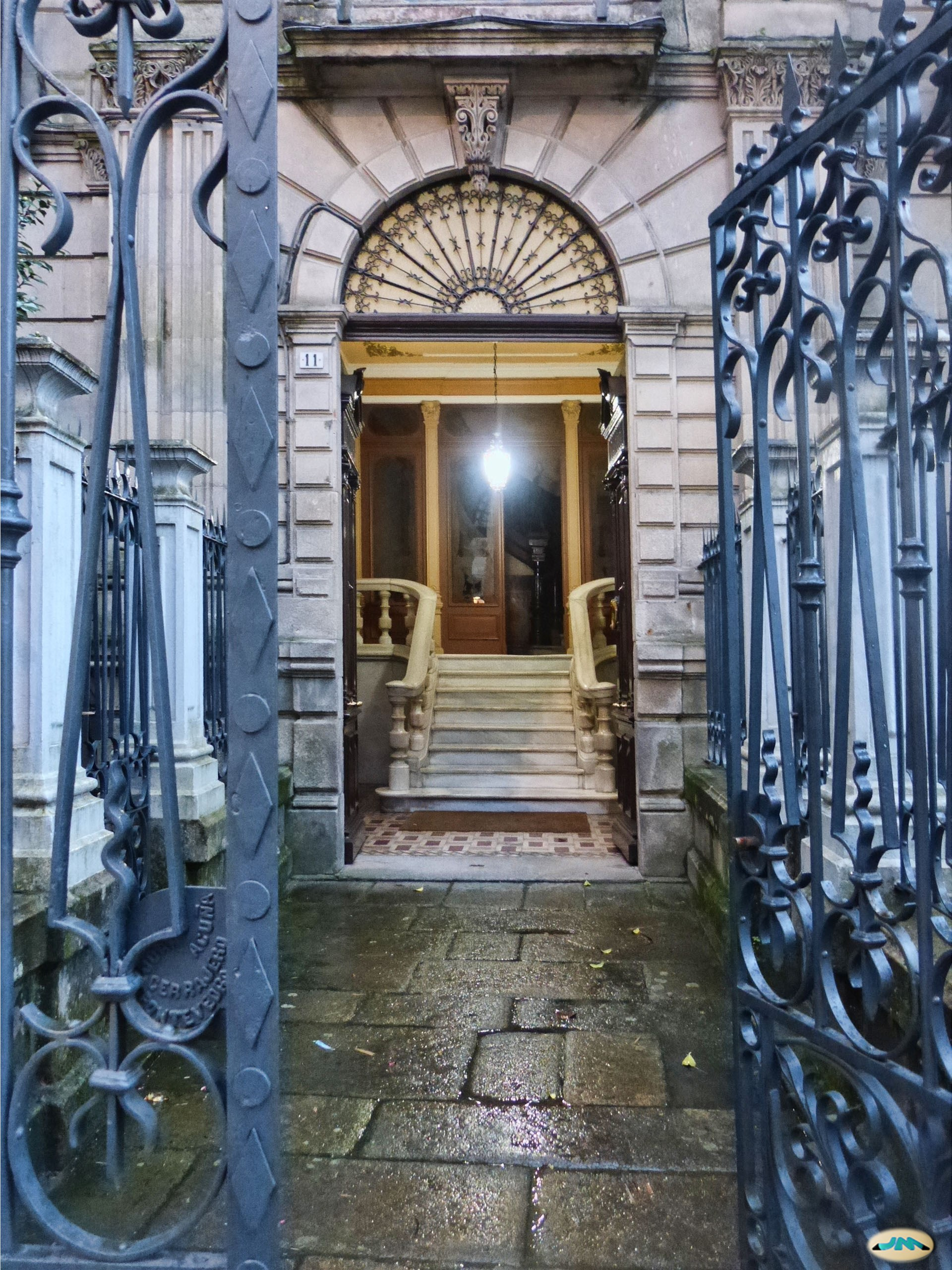
Entrance gate

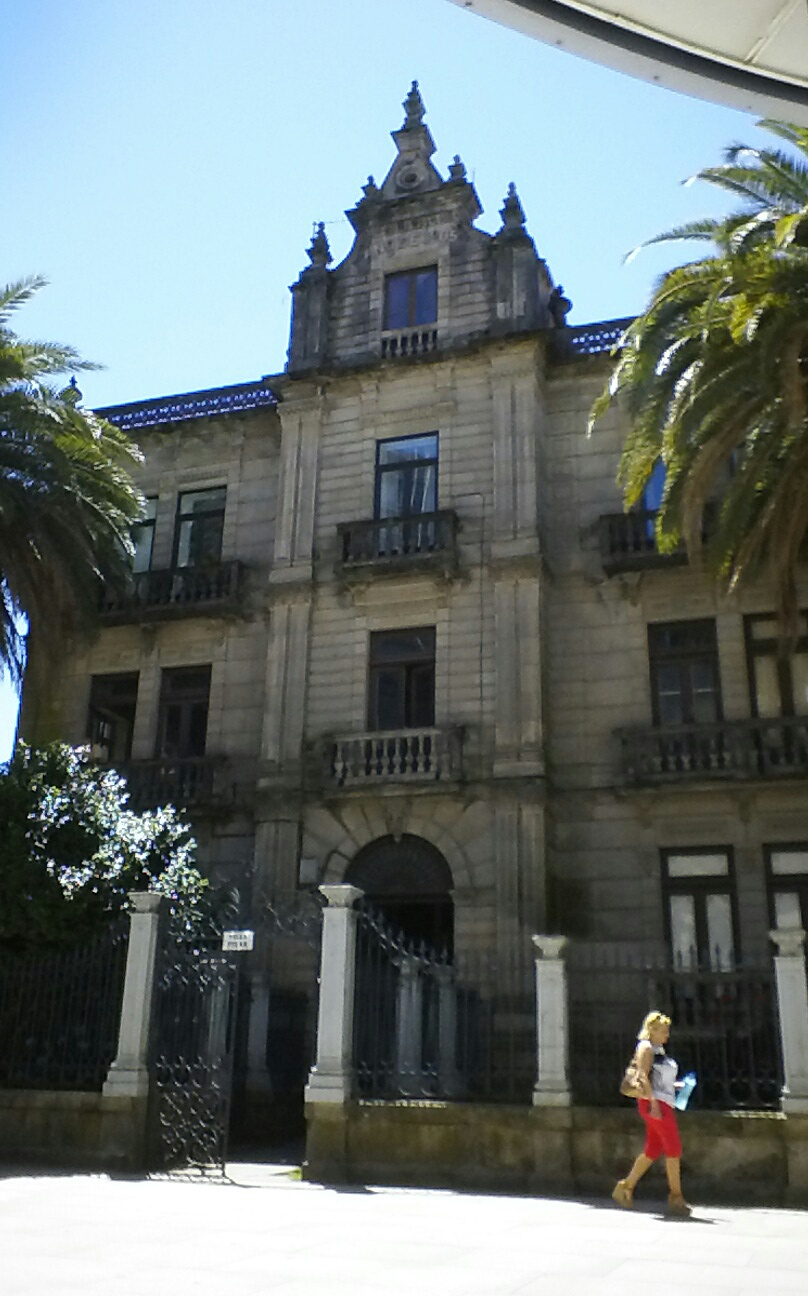
Main façade

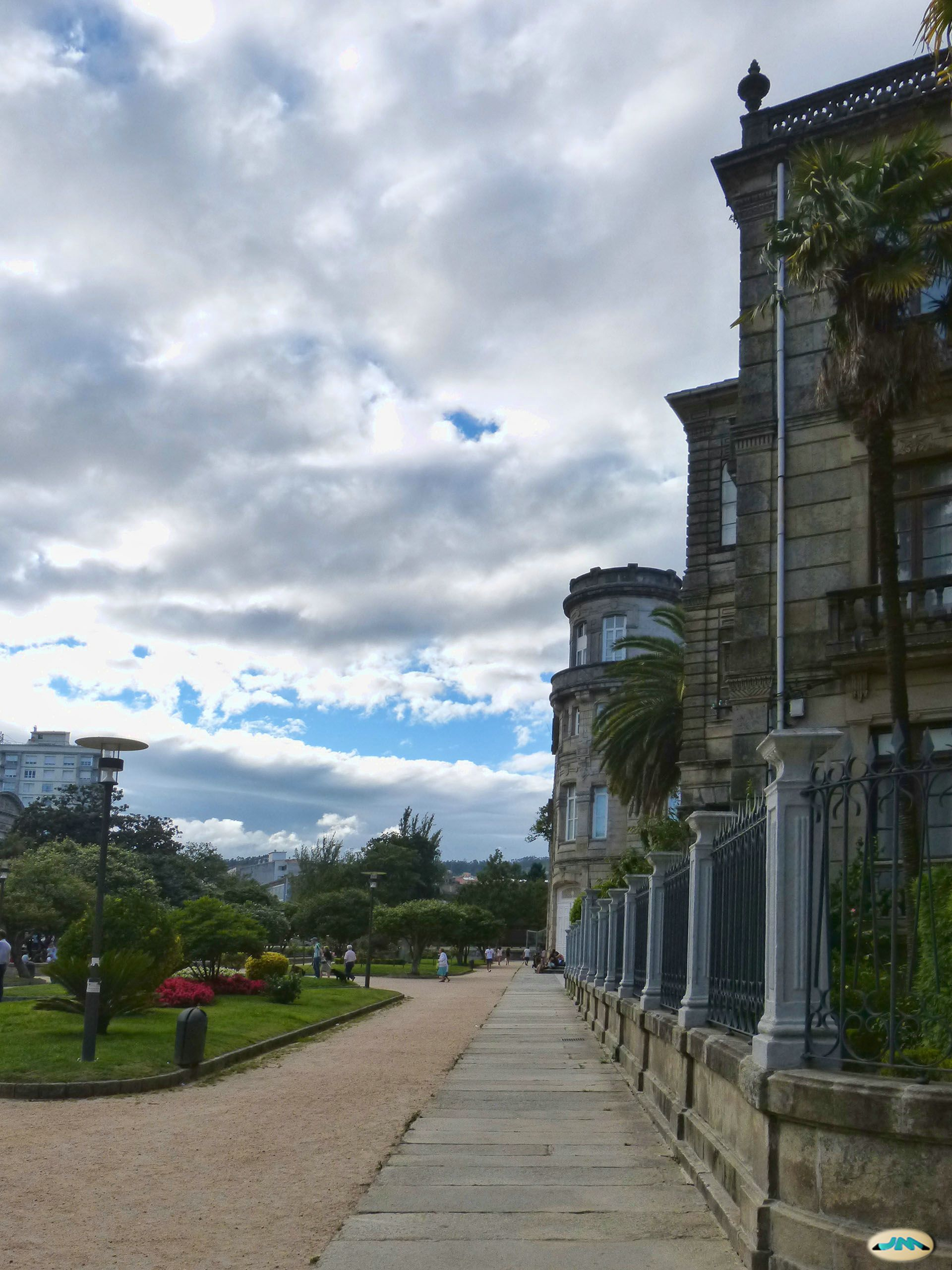
Rear façade on the Palm Trees Park

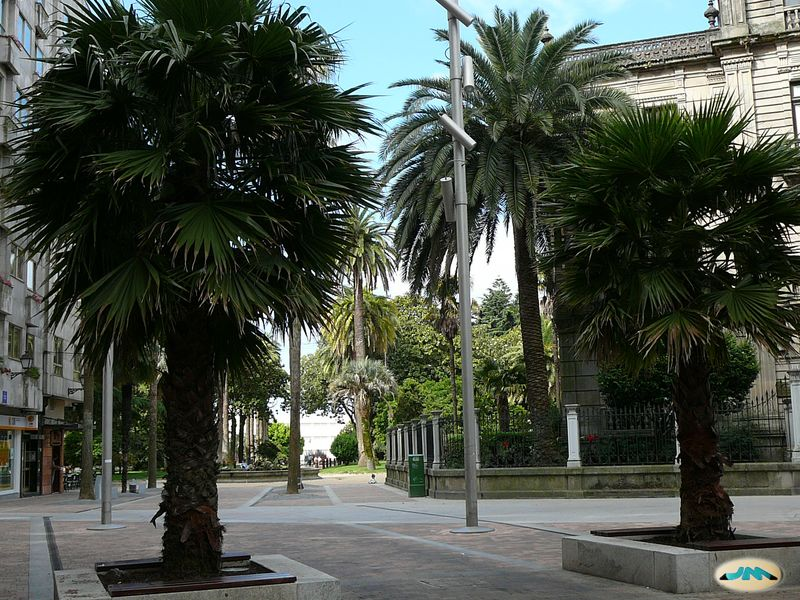
Façade between the palm trees

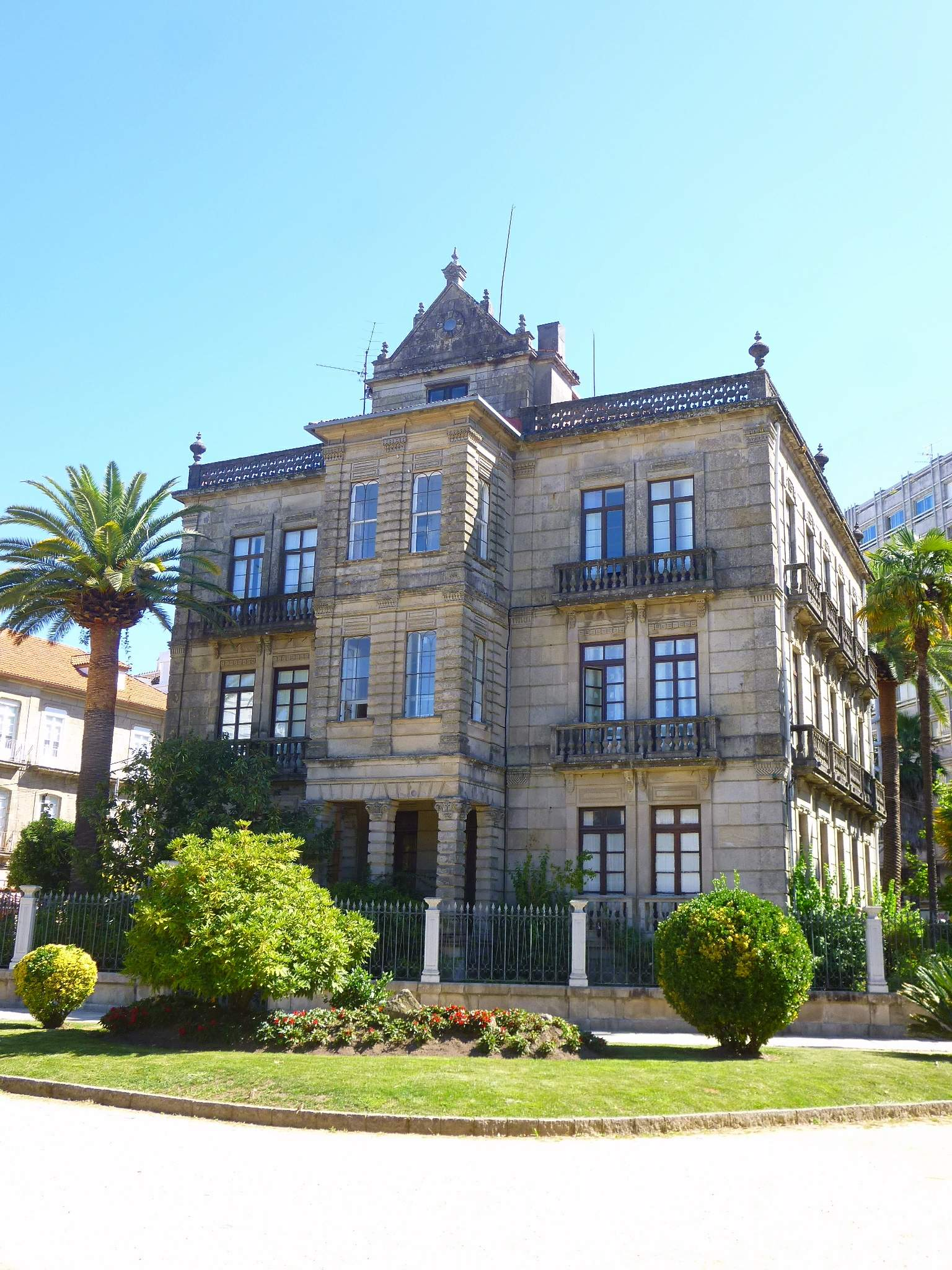
Back façade

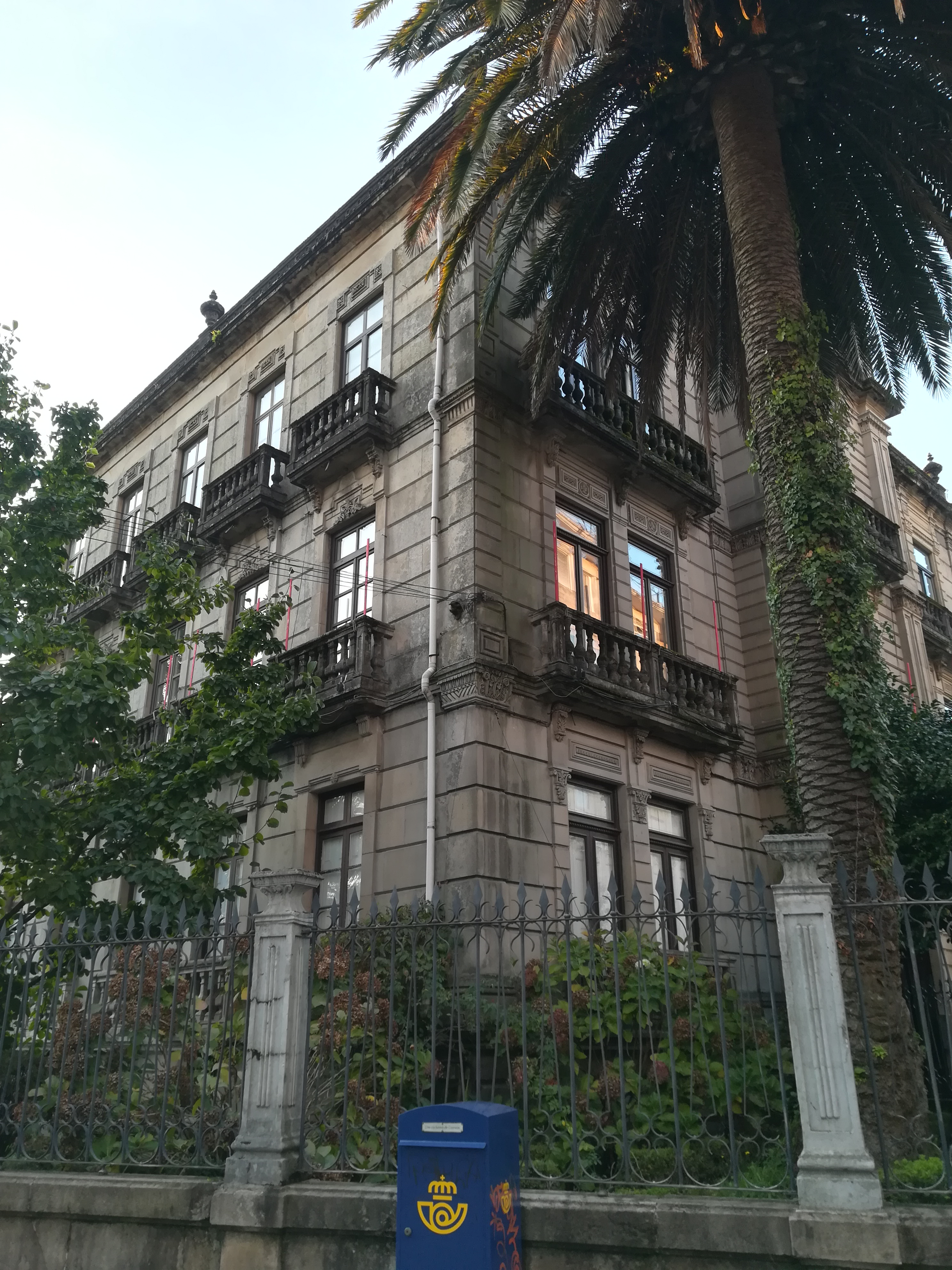

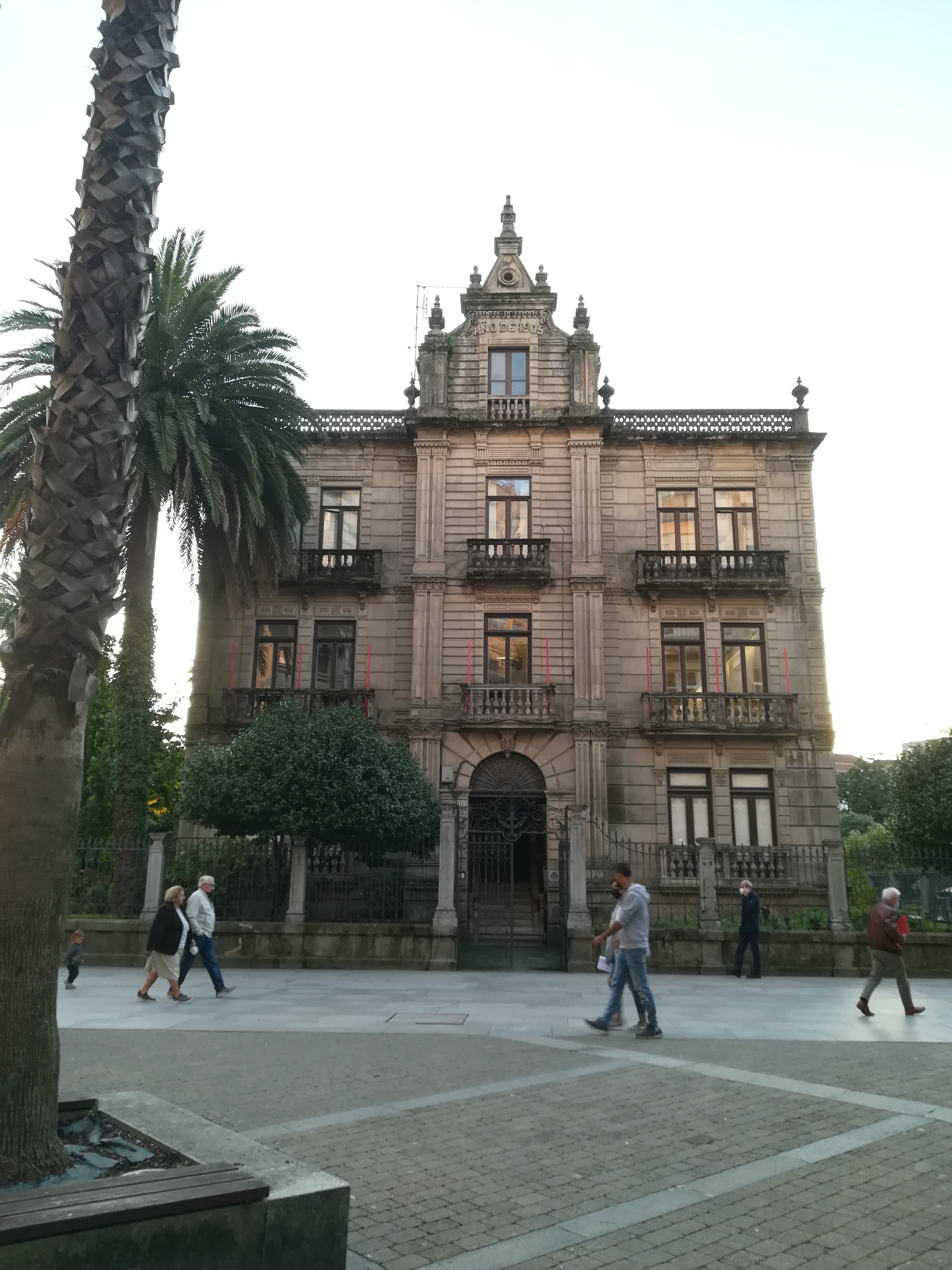

== See also ==
=== Bibliography ===
- Aganzo, Carlos (2010). Pontevedra. Ciudades con encanto (in Spanish). Madrid: El País-Aguilar. p. 97-98. ISBN 978-84-03-50934-4.
- Riveiro Tobío, Elvira (2008). Descubrir Pontevedra (in Spanish). Pontevedra: Edicións do Cumio. pp. 51, 136. ISBN 978-84-8289-085-2..

=== Related articles ===
- Marquis of Riestra Street
- Eclectic architecture
- Art Nouveau
- Valle-Inclán High School

=== External links ===
- Villa Pilar, on the website Galicia Tourism
- Nemonon on the website Nemonon
