= Indiano =

Spanish emigrants to the Americas who returned enriched

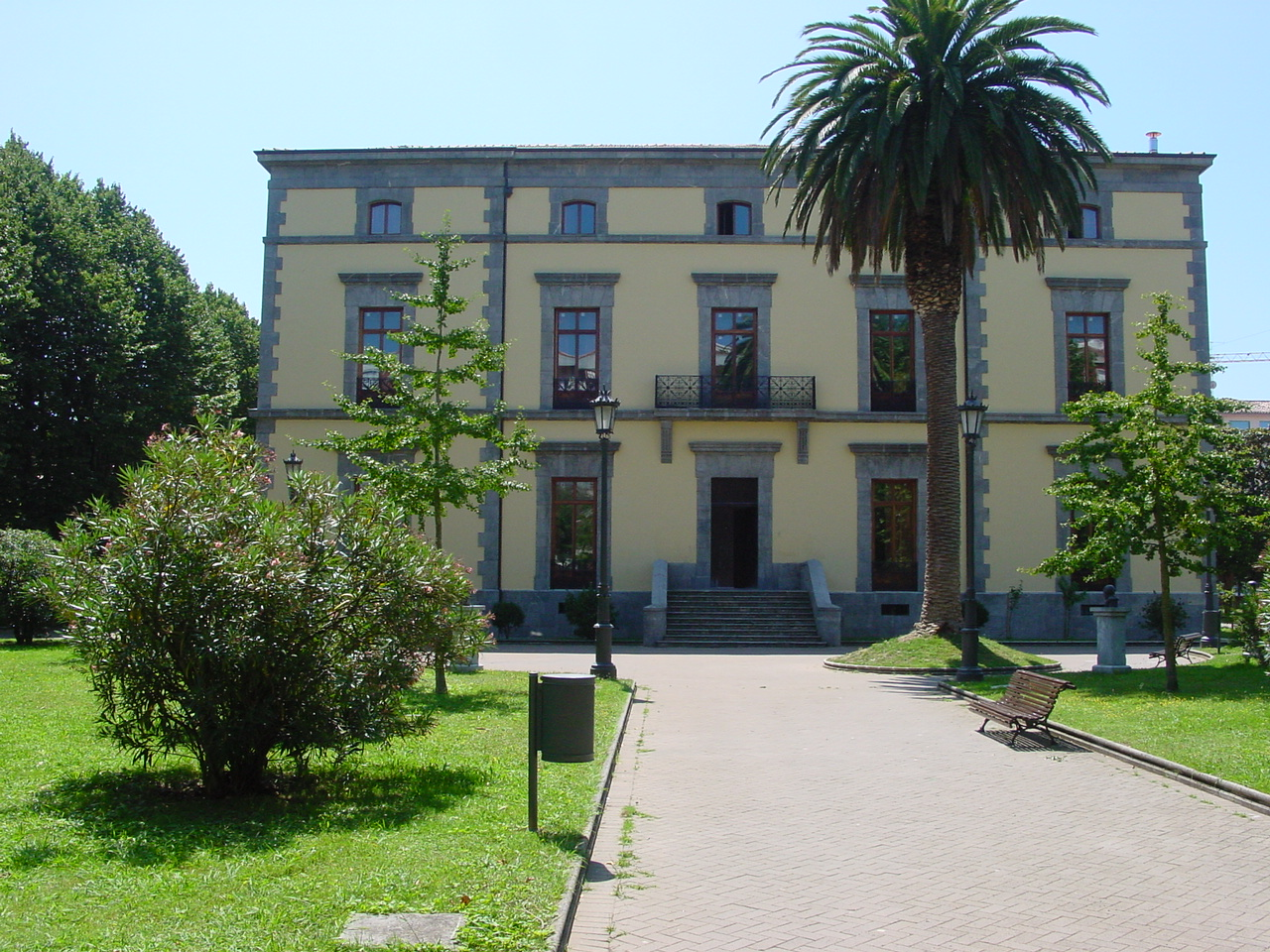
Palace of the Marquis of Manzanedo, now the Town Hall of Santoña (Cantabria). Note the palm tree in front of the entrance.

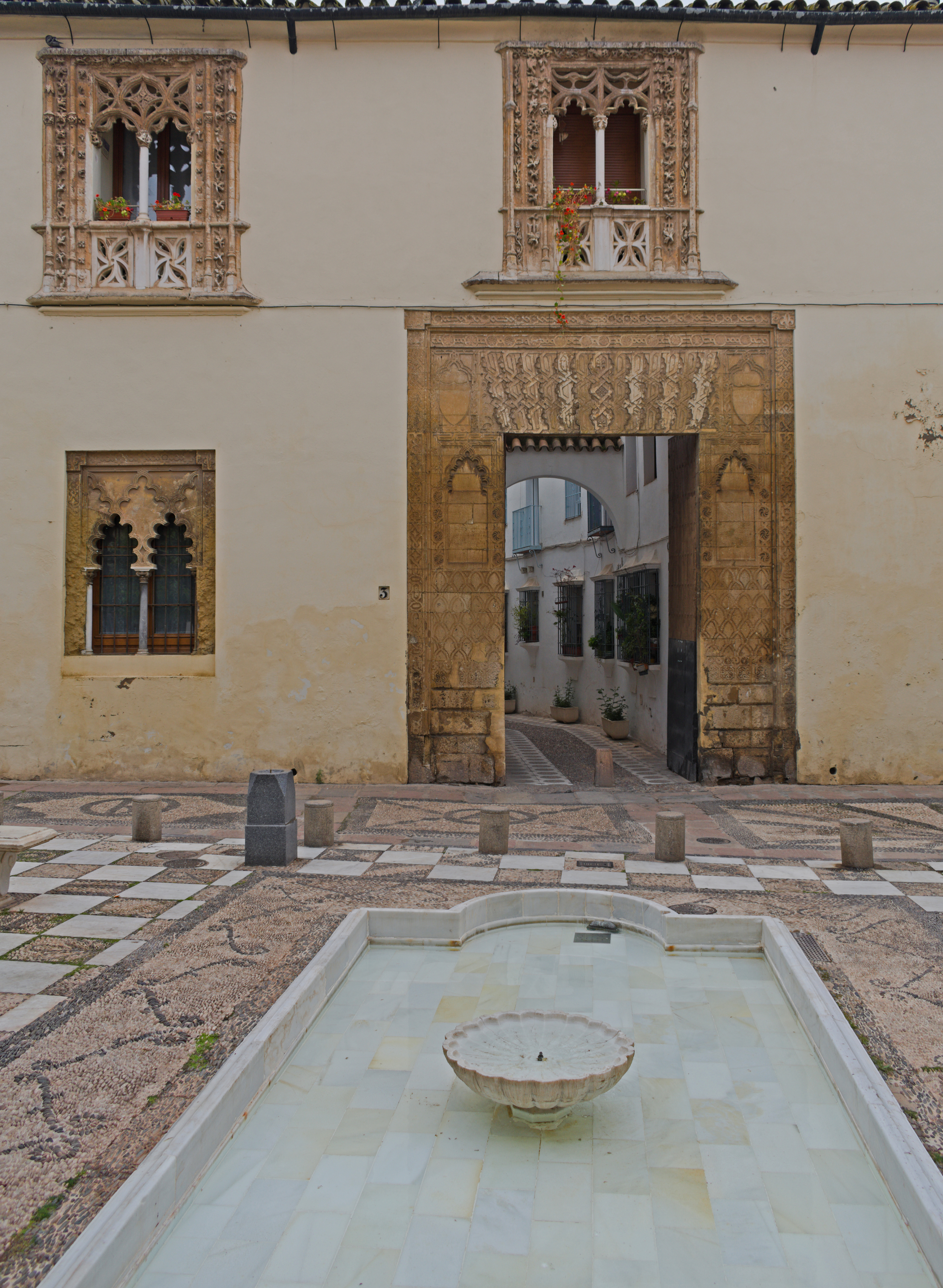
Casa de los Ceas in Cordoba, known as Casa del Indiano because it was bought by the wealthy indiano Juan Cosme Paniagua.

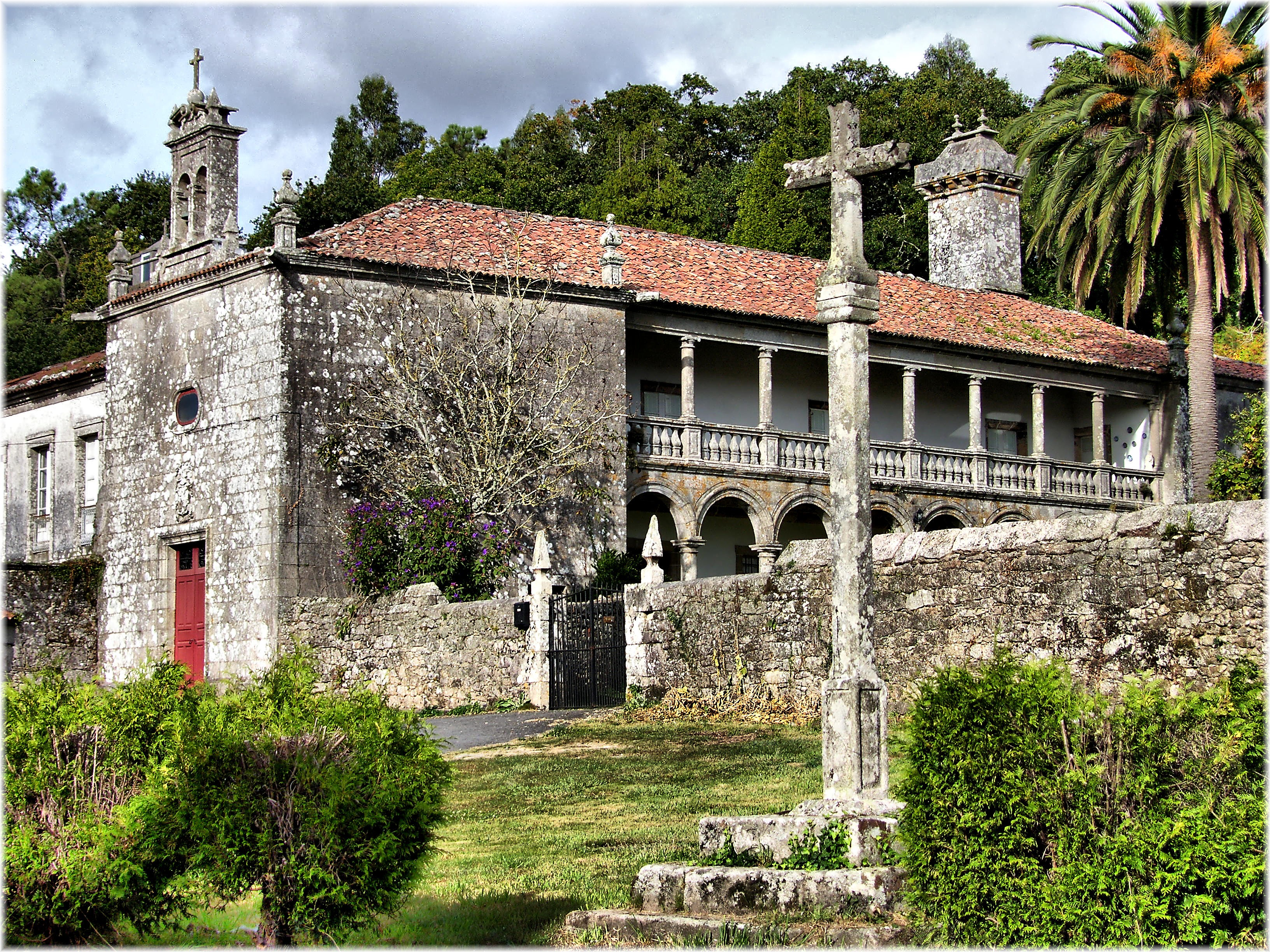
Pazo de Trasariz, in Vimianzo (A Coruña).

Indiano was the colloquial name for the Spanish emigrant in America who returned enriched, a social typology that had become a literary cliché since the Golden Age. The name was extended to their descendants, with admiring or pejorative connotations depending on the case.

The Indianos became local leaders in the era of caciquismo (late 19th and early 20th century), a period in which large contingents of young people, especially from regions with easy access to the sea, such as Galicia, Asturias, Cantabria, the Basque Country, Catalonia and the Canary Islands, were forced at that time to do what was known as the Americas: emigrate in search of a better fortune in Latin American countries such as Argentina, Brazil, Chile, Cuba, Mexico, Uruguay and Venezuela. In some cases, they came at the request of their relatives already established in those places, forming remarkably successful family businesses. Most were not so fortunate, and found no better fate in America than the poverty from which they were fleeing.

Those who managed to amass real fortunes and decided to return years later to their places of origin, sought prestige by acquiring some noble title, buying and restoring old casonas or pazos, or building new palaces, in a very colourful colonial or eclectic style, which came to be called "casonas", "casas de indianos" or "casas indianas" (in some areas, such as the Asturian town of Somao, they are particularly abundant). They often incorporated palm trees in their gardens as a symbol of their adventure in tropical lands. They also established their mecenazgo in charitable or cultural institutions, subsidising the construction of schools, churches and town halls, building and repairing roads, hospitals, asylums, water and electricity supplies, etc. Literature and art often made reference to the history of emigration to America and the return of the Indianos.

The cleanliness of the origins of some of these fortunes was always in question, especially those of those who enriched themselves through the slave trade (such as Antonio López y López, ennobled with the title of Marquis of Comillas), and who, in collusion with the landowners established overseas, set up the slave-owning lobby to obstruct any kind of abolitionist legislation that might be developed in the metropolis, such as the reforms promoted by Julio Vizcarrondo (himself a descendant of slave-owning landowners). Prominent among the pro-slavery group were Antonio Cánovas del Castillo (brother of José Cánovas del Castillo, who had become wealthy in Cuba) and Francisco Romero Robledo. Slavery was not definitively abolished in the Spanish colonies until October 7 of 1886.

== Indianos of Galicia ==
Galician emigration to Argentina and Cuba was so abundant that the epithet "Galicians" is still given there to any Spaniard, regardless of their regional origin. Alfonso Daniel Rodríguez Castelao coined the phrase: "the Galician does not ask, he emigrates". Among the most fortunate were Pancho de Reádegos, Basilio Álvarez, Benjamín Cudeiro, Juan and Jesús García-Naveira, Modesto Estévez, etc.

== Indianos of Asturias ==
Asturias has been, together with Galicia, the region from which most emigrants left for America. On their return, many of them built large houses that form part of the rich Indiano architecture in the Principality, especially in the eastern and western wings. Among the most conspicuous Asturian Indianos were Ramón Argüelles Alonso, later Marquis of Argüelles, Manuel Ibáñez Posada (who acquired the title of Count of Ribadedeva), his brother Luis Ibáñez Posada (who founded the Banco Hispano Americano with the repatriation of capital after the disaster of 1898), Íñigo Noriega Mendoza, Ulpiano Cuervo, Íñigo Noriega Laso, Manuel Suárez y Suárez and others.

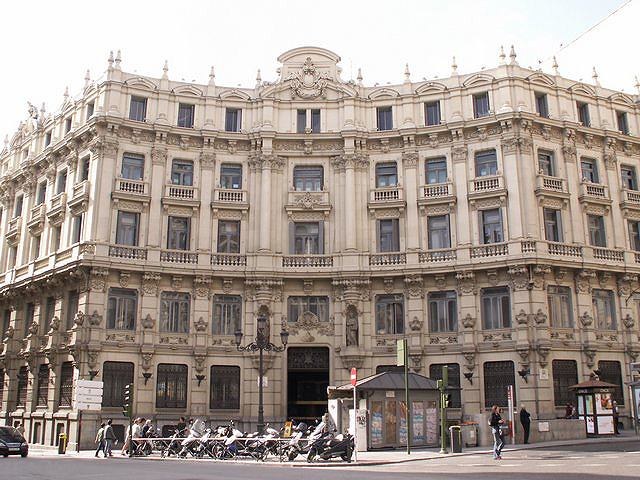
Headquarters of the Banco Hispano Americano in Madrid (1902–1905).

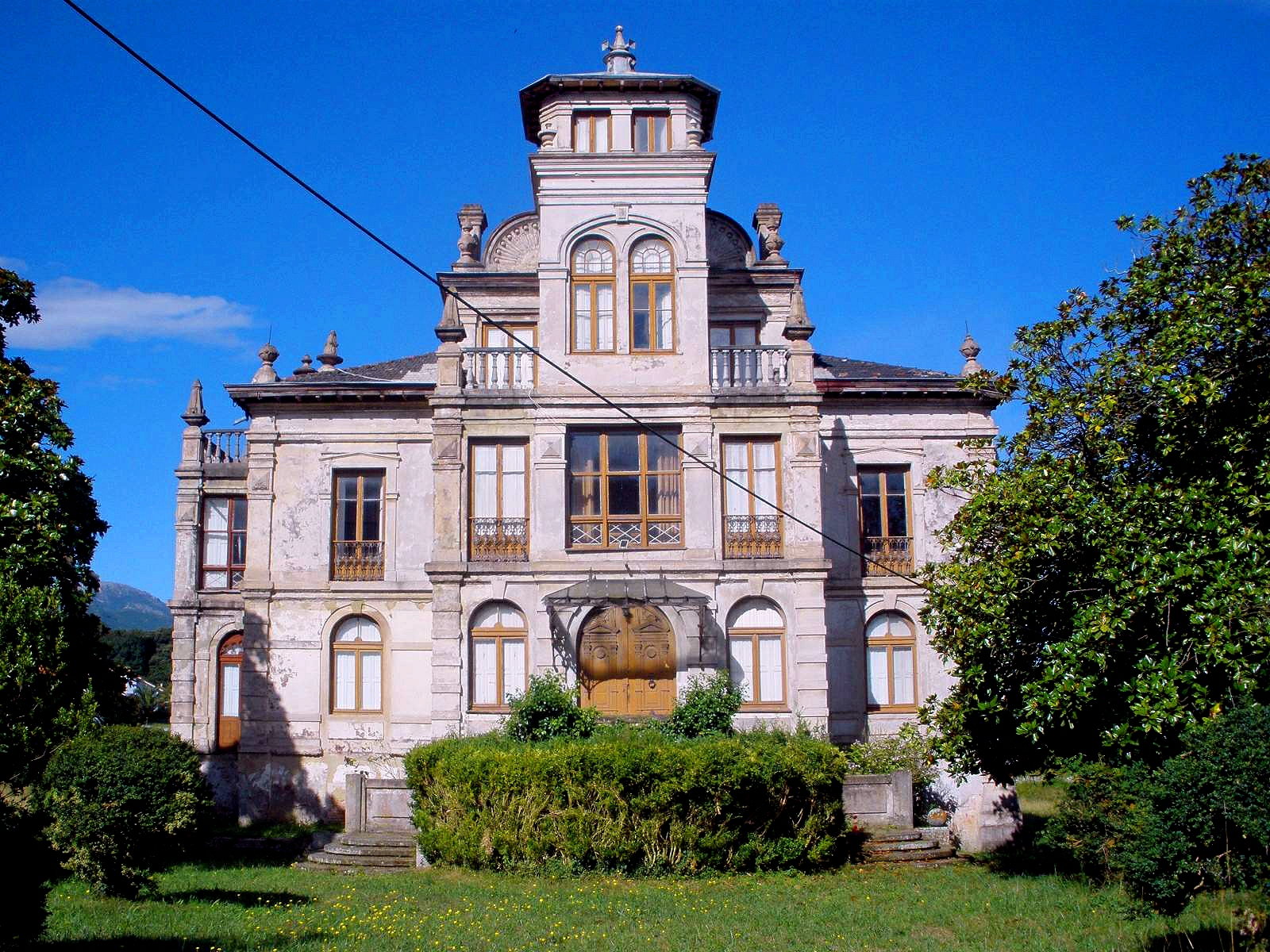
Palace of Partarríu in Llanes.

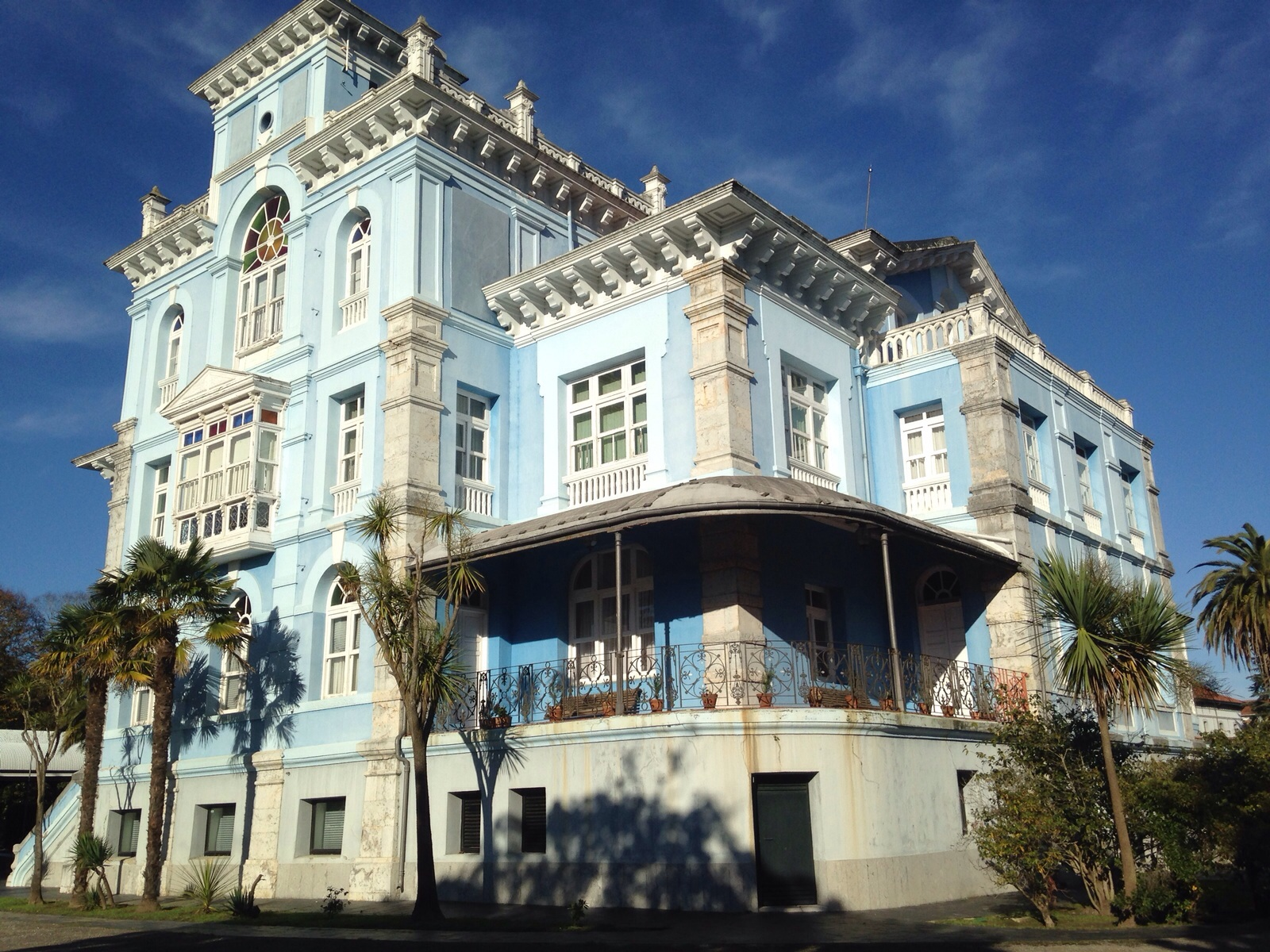
Archive of Indianos of Colombres (1906)

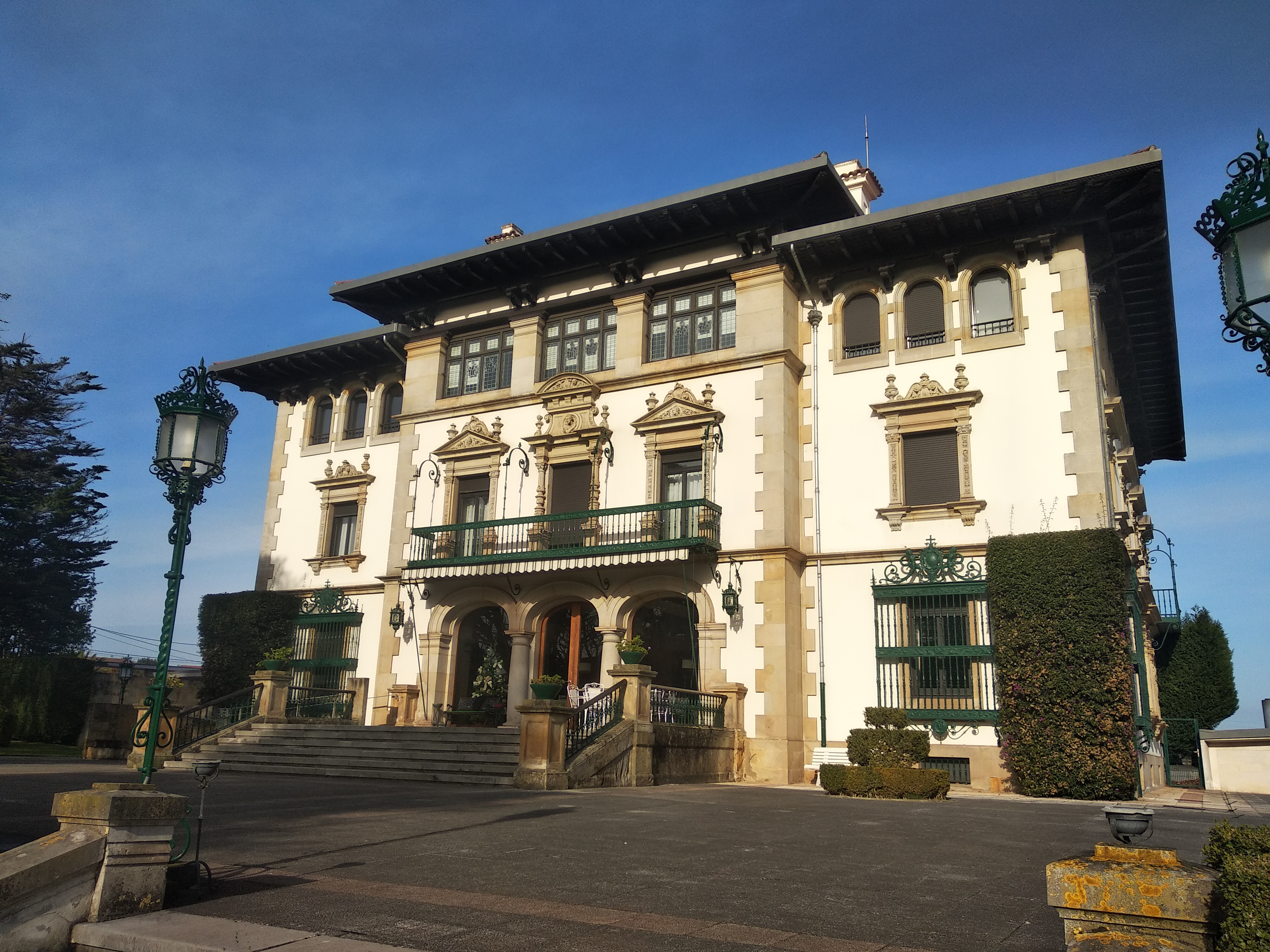
Solavieya (1918).

== Indianos of La Montaña ==
Among the Indianos of La Montaña (the traditional name of the current autonomous community of Cantabria), the figures of the Marquis of Comillas, the Marquis of Valdecilla, the Marquis of Manzanedo, the Count of La Mortera, Santiago Galas, Eusebio Gómez and Mateo Haya Obregón stand out. In his honour, in 1978, the Monumento al Indiano was erected at the top of Peña Cabarga, a privileged viewpoint overlooking the bay of Santander and the port from which thousands of emigrants left for the new continent.

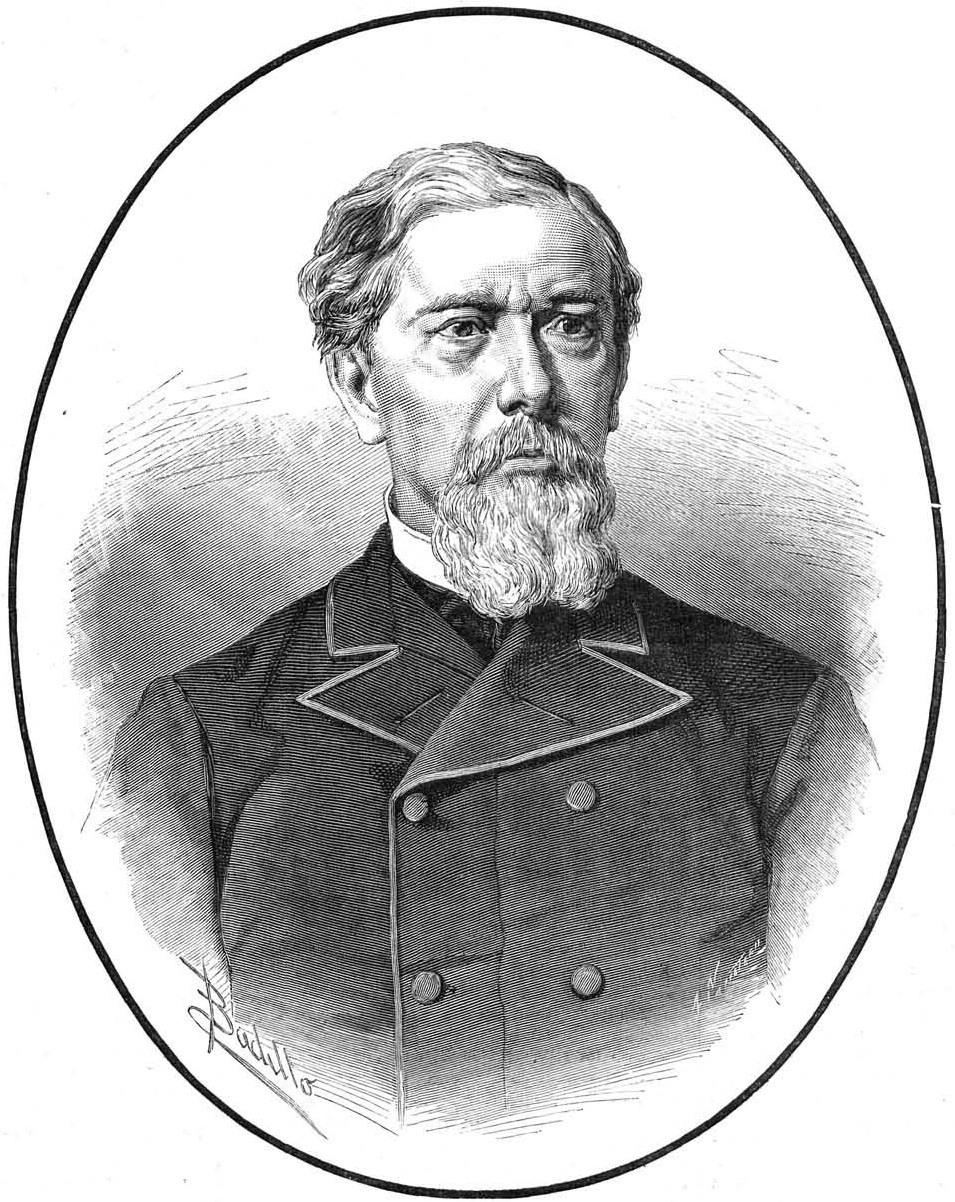
Antonio López y López, first Marquis of Comillas.

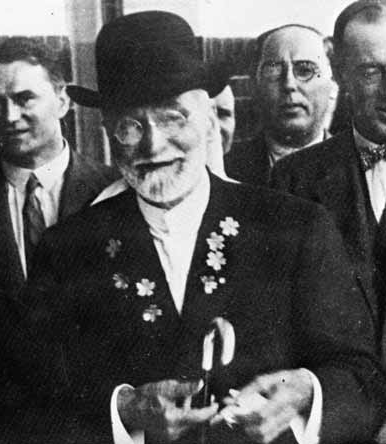
Ramón Pelayo de la Torriente, first Marquis of Valdecilla.

== Indianos from the Basque Country ==
The emigration of Basques from rural areas to America was historically very important, and was maintained and even increased in rural areas during the period of industrialisation in the late 19th and early 20th centuries, despite the fact that there was simultaneous internal immigration from the countryside to the city and from other Spanish regions to urban and industrial Basque areas. Examples of returned indianos were Romualdo Chávarri de la Herrera (1819–1899), Pío Bermejillo Ibarra (1820–1883), José Altuna Sagastibelza, Ramón Errazu, Miguel Sainz Indo (1823–1876), the couple formed by José Javier Uribarren and Marcue-Erquiaga (1791–1861) and María Jesús Aguirrebengoa (1811–1857), Martín Mendía Conde (1841–1924), Pascual Abaroa Uribarren (1825–1890), Paulino de la Sota y Ortiz (1831–1927), Romualdo Chávarri, Gregorio del Castillo Garna, José Arechabala, Juan de Zabala, Antonio and Rafael Amabizkar (1873–1952), Leandro Urrutia (1848–1908), Antonio Llaguno (1874–1958), Vivanco brothers (1885–1950), Pedro Juan de Zulueta, etc.

== Indianos of Catalonia ==
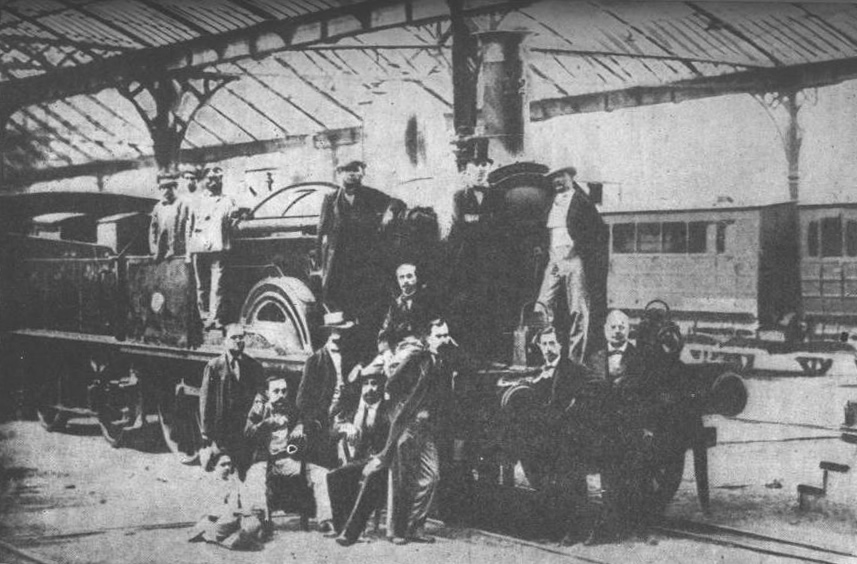
Builders and shareholders of the Barcelona-Mataró line promoted by Miguel Biada Buñol, the first peninsular railway line (1848).

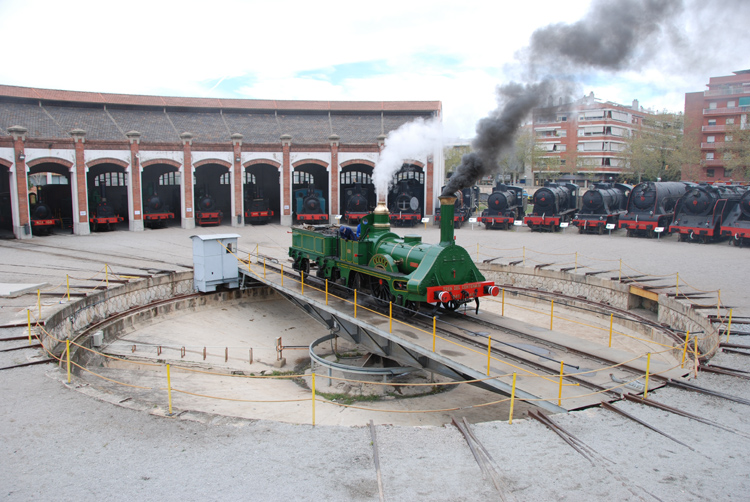
Locomotive that reproduces the original locomotive of the Barcelona-Mataró Railway promoted by Miguel Biada Buñol in the 1840s. It is currently preserved in the Railway Museum of Catalonia.

Among the Indianos who returned to Catalonia, the figure of Miguel Biada Buñol stands out. After working in the merchant navy throughout his life between Maracaibo and Havana, he was the driving force behind the Barcelona-Mataró Railway until 1848, the first railway line on the Iberian Peninsula and the second in Spain after La Havana-Güines Railway. He was a member of the Cortes Generales. He invested all or most of his fortune in this process and died before its inauguration.

Also noteworthy are José Xifré y Casas, Facundo Bacardí, Agustí Vilaret, Josep Maria Huertas, etc.

The Marquis of Comillas, originally from Las Montañas, settled in Barcelona on his return to Spain.

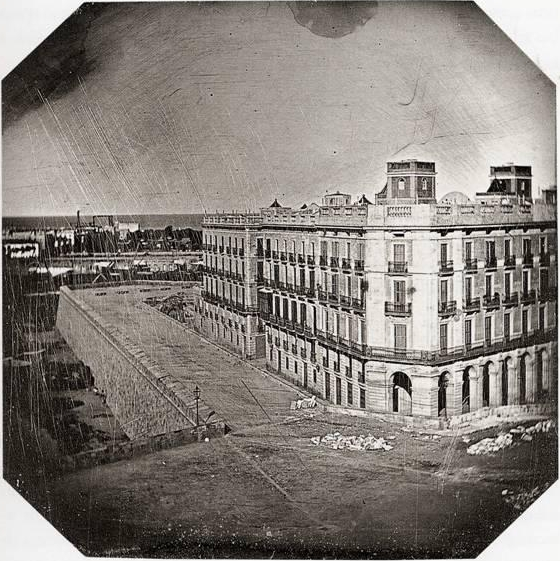
The first daguerreotype taken in Spain is of the Casa Xifré under construction (1848).

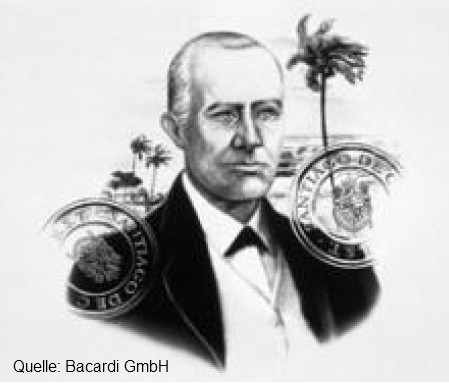
Facundo Bacardí.

== Indianos of the Canary Islands ==
Emigration from the Canary Islands was very intense from the 17th century until the beginning of the second half of the 20th century, and was especially intense in the latter period. The main destinations were Puerto Rico (19th century), Cuba (early 20th century), Argentina (1920s and 1930s) and Venezuela (mid-20th century). Other earlier emigrations were to a lesser extent to Uruguay (the city of Montevideo, the capital of that country, was founded by Canarians), the Dominican Republic and Texas (where Canarian emigrants founded the city of San Antonio). Such is the influence that emigration has had on Canarian society and culture that there are even several festivals in honour of the returned Indianos (Carnival of Santa Cruz de La Palma).

On 20 February 2023, after the pandemic, the Fiesta de los Indianos was celebrated again, bringing together more than 70,000 people.

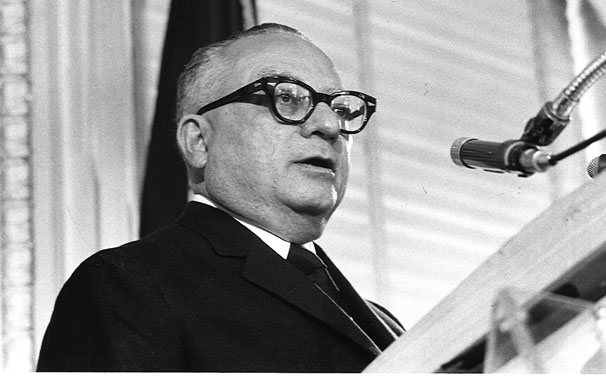
Rómulo Betancourt, son of a father from the Canary Islands, who became president of Venezuela.

== See also ==
- Contradanza
- Manuel Suárez y Suárez (entrepreneur and patron of the arts).
